= Wagner family =

Family of the composer Richard Wagner

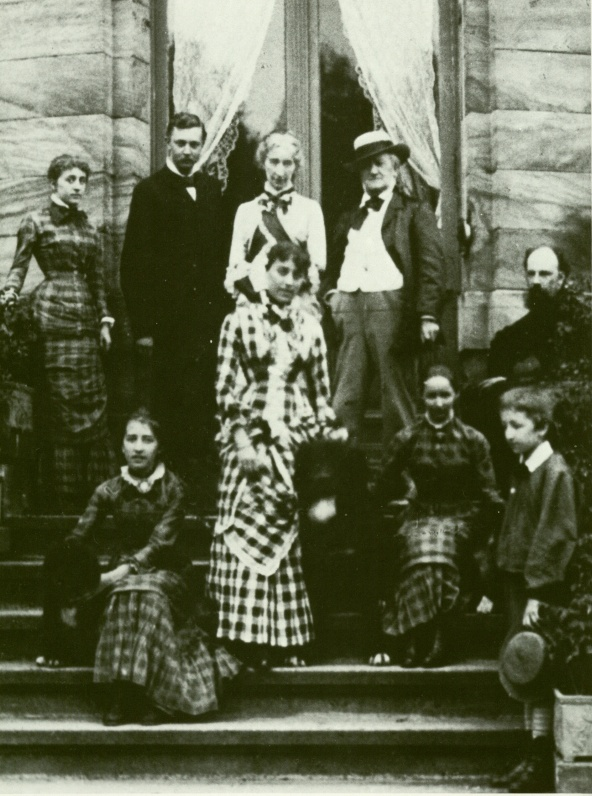
Richard Wagner and family in 1881. Left to right, top row: Blandine von Bülow, Heinrich von Stein (Siegfried's tutor), Cosima Wagner, Richard Wagner, Paul von Joukowsky (family friend); bottom row: Isolde, Daniela von Bülow, Eva, Siegfried

The family of the composer Richard Wagner:

== Family of Carl Friedrich Wagner ==
Carl Friedrich Wilhelm Wagner (1770–1813), a police actuary
∞ 1798 Johanna Rosine Wagner (1778–1848), daughter of a baker (after being widowed, in 1814 she became the partner of the painter, actor and writer Ludwig Geyer (1779–1821), whose rumoured paternity of Richard Wagner is neither substantiated nor disproved).

1. Albert Wagner (1799–1874), opera singer and stage director
  ∞ 1828 Elise Gollmann (1800–1864)
  1. Franziska Wagner (1829–1895)
    ∞ 1854 Alexander Ritter (1833–1896), musician and composer
  2. Marie Wagner (1831–1876)
    ∞ 1851 Karl Jacoby, merchant
  3. Johanna Wagner (adopted) (1828–1894), daughter of Eduard Freiherr von Bock von Wülfingen, opera singer and actress
    ∞ 1859 Alfred Jachmann (1829–1918), district administrator
2. Carl Gustav Wagner (1801–1802)
3. Rosalie Wagner (1803–1837), actress
  ∞ 1836 Oswald Marbach (1810–1890), university professor
4. Carl Julius Wagner (1804–1862)
5. Luise Wagner (1805–1872), actress
  ∞ 1828 Friedrich Brockhaus (1800–1865), publisher
6. Klara Wagner (1807–1875), opera singer
  ∞ 1829 Heinrich Wolfram (1800–1874), opera singer, later a merchant
7. Maria Theresia Wagner (1809–1814)
8. Ottilie Wagner (1811–1883)
  ∞ 1836 Hermann Brockhaus (1806–1877), orientalist
9. Richard Wagner (1813–1883), composer
  ∞ 1. 1836 Minna Planer (1809–1866), actress
  ∞ 2. 1870 Cosima Liszt (1837–1930), daughter of Franz Liszt and Marie d'Agoult, divorced in 1870 from the conductor Hans von Bülow, mother of five children (including Cosima's two daughters with Bülow, Blandine and Daniela, Wagner's step-children):
  1. Isolde Ludowitz von Bülow (1865–1919)
    ∞ 1900 Franz Beidler (1872–1930), music director
    1. Franz Wilhelm Beidler (1901–1981)
  2. Eva von Bülow (1867–1942)
    ∞ 1908 Houston Stewart Chamberlain (1855–1927), author
  3. Siegfried Wagner (1869–1930), composer, conductor and stage director
    ∞ 1915 Winifred Marjorie Williams (1897–1980), adopted daughter of the pianist Karl Klindworth
    1. Wieland Wagner (1917–1966), stage director
      ∞ 1941 Gertrud Reissinger (1916–1998), dancer and choreographer
      1. Iris Wagner (1942–2014)
      2. Wolf Siegfried Wagner (born 1943),
        ∞ 1. Malo Osthoff
        ∞ 2. Eleonore Gräfin Lehndorff
        1. Joy Olivia Wagner
      3. Nike Wagner (born 1945), dramaturg and publicist,
        ∞ 1. Jean Launay
        ∞ 2. Jürg Stenzl (born 1942), musicologist
        1. Louise Launay
      4. Daphne Wagner (born 1946), actress
        ∞ 1. Udo Proksch (1934–2001) businessman and industrialist (murderer convicted in the Lucona case)
        ∞ 2. Tilman Spengler (born 1947) author and publisher
    2. Friedelind Wagner (1918–1991)
    3. Wolfgang Wagner (1919–2010), stage director,
      1. ∞ 1943 Ellen Drexel (1919–2002), divorced 1976
        1. Eva Wagner-Pasquier (born 1945), theatre manager
          ∞ Yves Pasquier, film producer
          1. Antoine Amadeus Wagner-Pasquier (born 1982)
        2. Gottfried Wagner (born 1947), musicologist
          ∞ 1. Beatrix Kraus
          ∞ 2. Teresina Rosetti
          1. Eugenio Wagner (born 1987)
      2. ∞ 1976 Gudrun Mack-Armann (1944–2007)
        1. Katharina Wagner (born 1978), stage director
    4. Verena Wagner (1920–2019)
      ∞ 1943 Bodo Lafferentz (1897–1974), Nazi Party member and SS Obersturmbannführer
      1. Amélie Lafferentz (born 1944)
        ∞ Manfred Hohmann
        1. Christopher Hohmann
      2. Manfred Lafferentz (born 1945)
        ∞ Gunhild Mix
        1. Leif Henning Lafferentz (born 1979)
      3. Winifred Lafferentz (born 1947)
        ∞ Paul Arminjon
        1. Wendy Arminjon (born 1973)
        2. Mathias Arminjon (born 1981)
      4. Wieland Lafferentz (born 1949)
        ∞ Isabella Weiß
        1. Verena Maja Lafferentz (born 1981), jazz singer
      5. Verena Lafferentz (born 1952)
        ∞ Tilo Schnekenburger

== Family of Ludwig Geyer ==
The widowed Johanna Wagner became the partner of Ludwig Geyer in 1814. It is assumed that they married although no evidence has been found of this. It has been speculated that Geyer was Richard Wagner's biological father.

Ludwig Geyer (1779–1821) ∞? 1815 Johanna Wagner

1. Caecilie Geyer (1815–1893)
  ∞ Eduard Avenarius (1809-1885)
  1. Richard Avenarius (1843–1896)
    1. Johannes Maximilian Avenarius (1887–1954)
  2. Ferdinand Avenarius (1856–1923)

== See also ==
- Wagner (surname)
- List of musical families (classical music)
