= Christian Thielemann =

German conductor (born 1959)

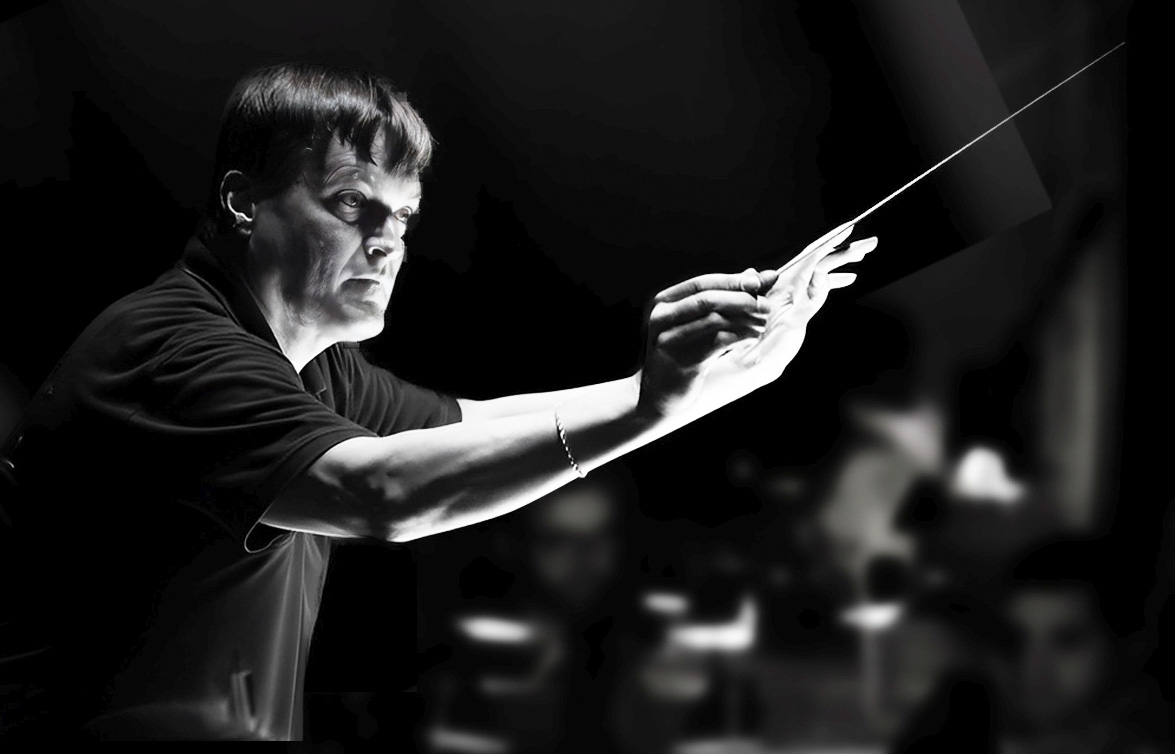
- Conducting at the Vienna State Opera in 2022
- Born: 1 April 1959 (age 67); West Berlin
- Occupation: Conductor
- Awards: Order of Merit of the Federal Republic of Germany

Christian Thielemann (born 1 April 1959) is a German conductor. He is Generalmusikdirektor of the Berlin State Opera (Staatsoper Unter den Linden) and chief conductor of the Staatskapelle Berlin.

== Biography ==
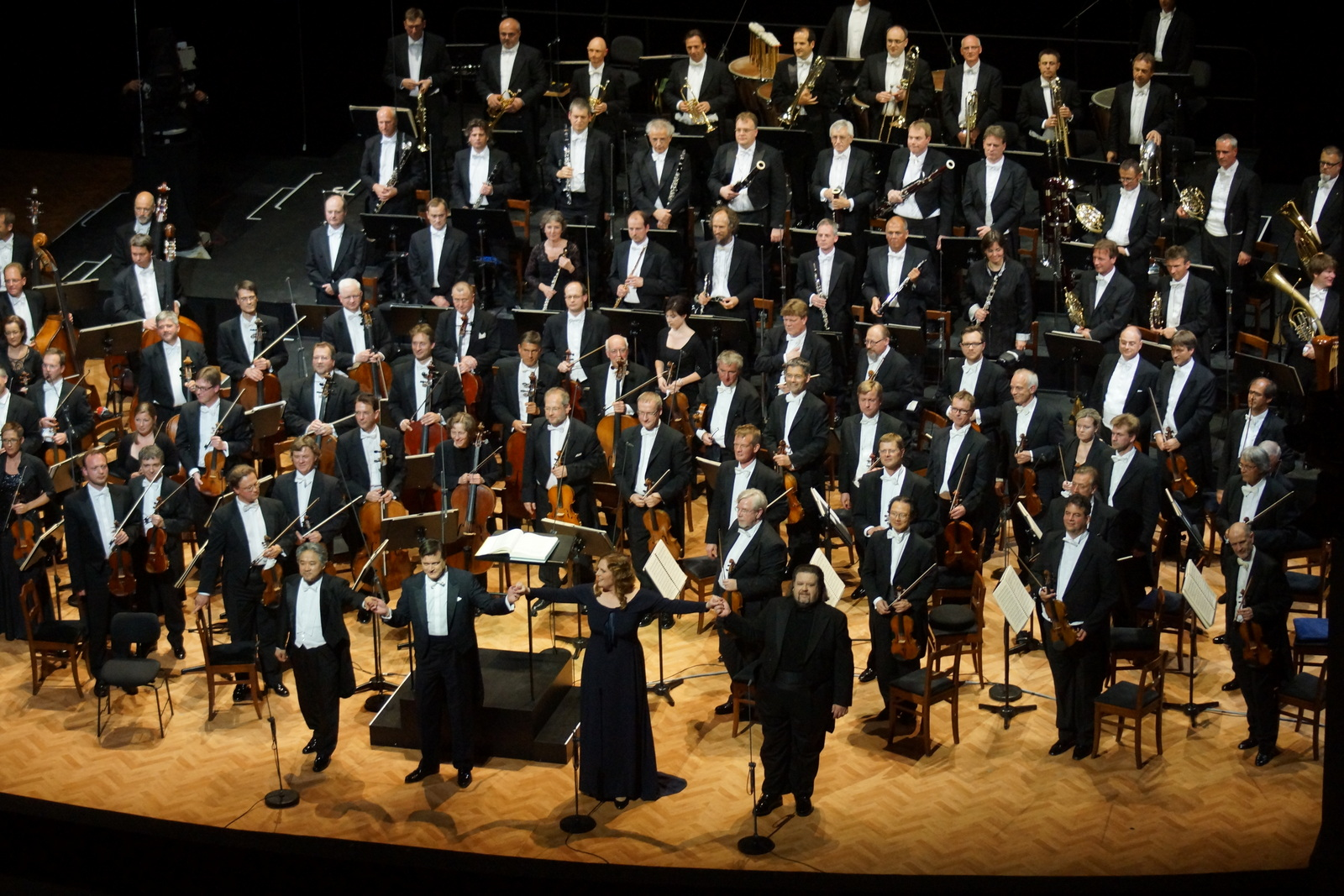
Thielemann on stage (front, second from the left) with Kwangchul Yoon, Eva-Maria Westbroek and Johann Botha at the Bayreuth Festival Orchstra, 2013.

Born in West Berlin, Thielemann studied viola and piano there and took private lessons in composition and conducting before becoming répétiteur at 19 at the Deutsche Oper Berlin with Heinrich Hollreiser and working as Herbert von Karajan's assistant. He worked at a number of smaller German theatres, including the Musiktheater im Revier in Gelsenkirchen; in Karlsruhe, Hanover, at Düsseldorf's Deutsche Oper am Rhein as First Kapellmeister; and in Nürnberg as Generalmusikdirektor before returning to the Deutsche Oper Berlin in 1991 to conduct Wagner's Lohengrin. During this time, he also assisted Daniel Barenboim at the Bayreuth Festival.

Thielemann made his US debut during the 1991–1992 season in a new production of Strauss's Elektra in San Francisco. Subsequent engagements at the Metropolitan Opera in New York City followed. In 1997, he became Generalmusikdirektor of the Deutsche Oper Berlin. A report in 2000 stated that Thielemann was to leave the Deutsche Oper in 2001 over artistic conflicts with the then-incoming artistic director Udo Zimmermann. Thielemann remained with the company until 2004, when he resigned over conflicts regarding Berlin city funding between the Deutsche Oper and the Staatsoper Unter den Linden.

Thielemann became principal conductor and music director of the Munich Philharmonic in September 2004. He stepped down from his Munich post in 2011 after disputes with orchestra management over final approval of selection of guest conductors and programs for the orchestra.

In October 2009, the Sächsische Staatskapelle Dresden announced the appointment of Thielemann as its next chief conductor, effective with the 2012/13 season. His contract with Dresden was through 2019. In November 2017, the Staatskapelle Dresden announced the extension of Thielemann's contract as chief conductor through 31 July 2024. In 2020, Thielemann was appointed honorary professor at the Carl Maria von Weber Academy of Music in Dresden. In May 2021, Barbara Klepsch, the Culture Minister of Saxony, announced that Thielemann would conclude his tenure with the Staatskapelle Dresden at the close of his contract at the end of July 2024.

Thielemann was artistic director of the Salzburg Easter Festival from 2013 to 2022. In January 2023, he stepped in as an emergency substitute conductor for Daniel Barenboim in a new production of Wagner's Der Ring des Nibelungen at the Staatsoper Unter den Linden. In September 2023, the Berlin Senate and the Staatsoper Unter den Linden announced the appointment of Thielemann as its next general music director, effective 1 September 2024. In October 2026, the Staatsoper Unter den Linden announced an extension of Thielemann's contract as GMD through the 2033–2034 season.

Thielemann has been a regular conductor at the Bayreuth Festival, following his début in 2000 with Wagner's Die Meistersinger von Nürnberg, and at the Salzburg Festival. With the decision in September 2008 of the Richard Wagner Festival Foundation to appoint Katharina Wagner and Eva Wagner-Pasquier to succeed Wolfgang Wagner as directors of the Bayreuth Festival, Thielemann was named musical advisor. In June 2015, the Bayreuth Festival formally announced Thielemann's appointment as its music director. With his conducting of Lohengrin in 2018, Thielemann became the second conductor, after Felix Mottl, to conduct the ten canonical operas by Wagner that are regularly performed at the Bayreuth Festival. Thielemann stood down from the Bayreuth Festival post in 2020.

In 2003, Thielemann was awarded the Order of Merit of the Federal Republic of Germany. In October 2011, he received honorary membership of the Royal Academy of Music in London. In 2015, Thielemann won the Richard Wagner Award (Richard-Wagner-Preis) of Leipzig. He served in the Humanitas Programme as visiting professor in Opera Studies at Oxford University in January 2016. In 2019, he made his first conducting appearance in the New Year's Concert with the Vienna Philharmonic Orchestra, and returned there to conduct the 2024 concert.

== Recordings ==
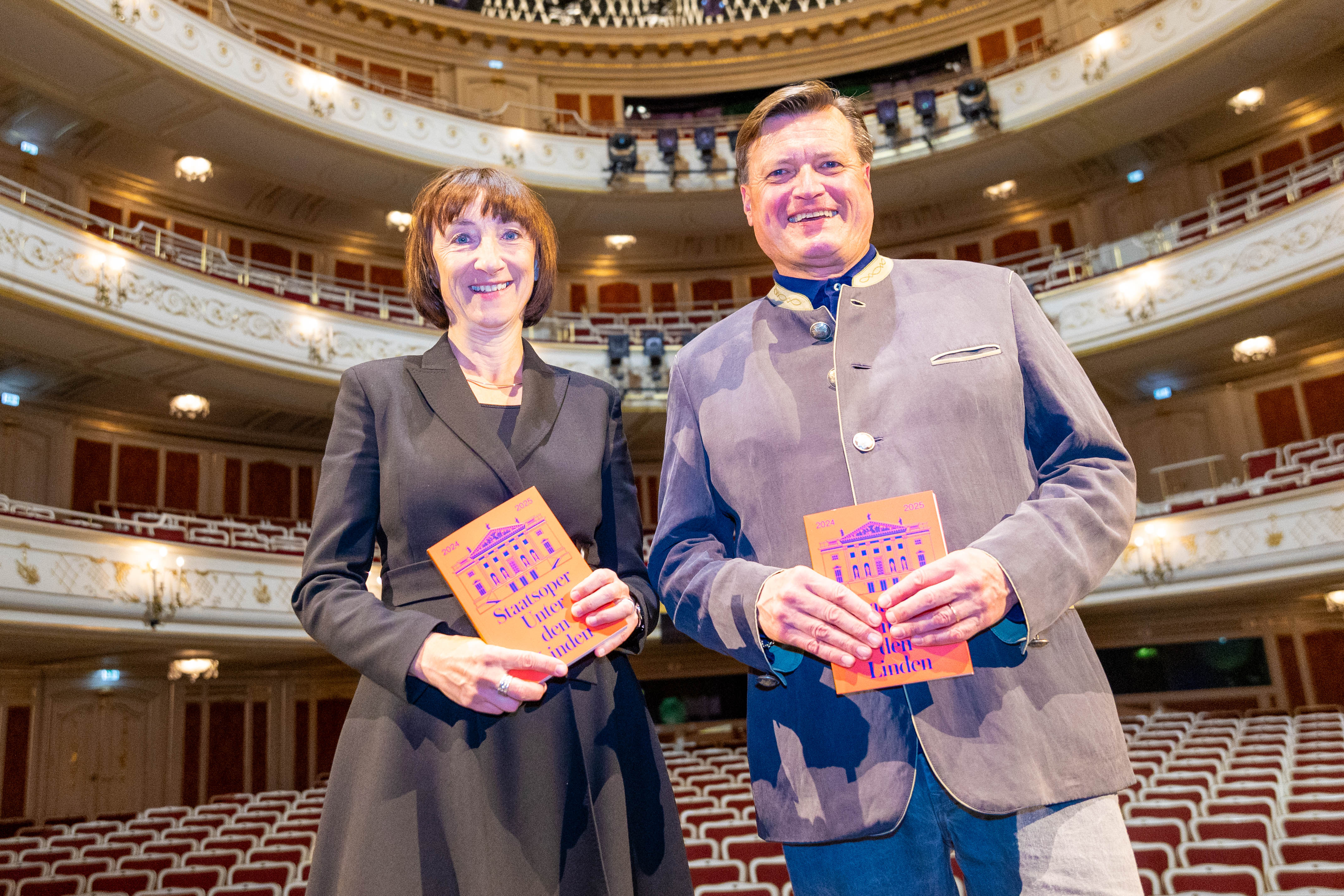
Thielemann at the Staatsoper Unter den Linden, 2024, with Elisabeth Sobotka.

For Sony Music

- Ludwig van Beethoven: Beethoven, 9 Symphonies, Vienna Philharmonic, 2012
- Anton Bruckner: Bruckner, 11 Symphonies, Vienna Philharmonic, 2023
- Robert Schumann: Schumann, 4 Symphonies, Sächsische Staatskapelle Dresden, 2018
- New Year's Concert 2019, Vienna Philharmonic
- New Year's Concert 2024, Vienna Philharmonic

For Profil

- Anton Bruckner: Symphony No. 8, Sächsische Staatskapelle Dresden, October 2010

For Opus Arte

- Richard Wagner: Der Ring des Nibelungen with Michelle Breedt, Albert Dohmen, Stephen Gould, Hans-Peter König, Linda Watson and Eva-Maria Westbroek, Bayreuth Festival orchestra, recorded live during the 2008 Festival, November 2009

For Brilliant Classics

- Arnold Schoenberg, Richard Wagner: Pelleas und Melisande and Siegfried Idyll, Orchestra of the Deutsche Oper Berlin, November 2009

For Decca

- Richard Strauss: Der Rosenkavalier DVD with Renée Fleming, Sophie Koch, Diana Damrau, Franz Hawlata and Jonas Kaufmann, Munich Philharmonic, October 2009

For Deutsche Grammophon

- Der kleine Hörsaal, Dirigieren mit Christian Thielemann, July 2007
- Ludwig van Beethoven: Overture "Egmont" and Johannes Brahms, Symphony No.1, Munich Philharmonic, April 2007
- Wolfgang Amadeus Mozart: Requiem, Munich Philharmonic and Choir of the Bavarian Radio Symphony Orchestra, November 2006
- Richard Wagner: Parsifal, Choir and Orchestra of the Vienna State Opera, April 2006
- Anton Bruckner: Symphony No.5, Munich Philharmonic, March 2005
- Heinrich Marschner, Felix Mendelssohn Bartholdy, Otto Nicolai, Carl Maria von Weber, Richard Wagner: Overtures, Vienna Philharmonic, October 2004
- Richard Wagner: Tristan und Isolde, Orchestra of the Vienna State Opera, May 2004
- Richard Strauss: Ein Heldenleben and Symphonic Fantasy from Die Frau ohne Schatten, Vienna Philharmonic, August 2003
- Albert Lortzing, Richard Strauss, Carl Maria von Weber, Richard Wagner: Deutsche Opernarien with Thomas Quasthoff and the Orchestra of the Deutsche Oper Berlin, April 2002
- Robert Schumann, Symphonies No.1 and No.4, Philharmonia Orchestra, 2001
- Richard Strauss: Arabella with Kiri Te Kanawa and the Orchestra and Choir of the Metropolitan Opera, March 2001
- Richard Strauss: Eine Alpensinfonie and Suite from Der Rosenkavalier, Vienna Philharmonic, March 2001
- Arnold Schoenberg: Pelleas und Melisande and Richard Wagner, Siegfried Idyll, June 1999
- Carl Orff: Carmina Burana, Choir and Orchestra of the Deutsche Oper Berlin, May 1999
- Robert Schumann: Symphony No.3 "Rheinische", Overture "Genoveva", Op. 81, Overture, Scherzo and Finale, Op. 52, Philharmonia Orchestra, 1999
- Richard Wagner: Orchestral music (Lohengrin, Parsifal, Tristan und Isolde), Philadelphia Orchestra, February 1998
- Robert Schumann: Symphony No.2: Overture Manfred, Konzertstück for 4 Horns, Op. 86, Philharmonia Orchestra, September 1997
- Ludwig van Beethoven: Funeral Cantata on the Death of the Emperor Joseph II, Robert Schumann, Konzertstück, Op. 86, for 4 Horns and Orchestra, Hans Pfitzner, Palestrina (Preludes to acts 1 and 2), 1997
- Hans Pfitzner: Music from Palestrina; Das Käthchen von Heilbronn; Richard Strauss, Guntram (prelude), Capriccio (prelude), Feuersnot (love scene), Orchestra of the Deutsche Oper Berlin, 1996

For EMI Classics

- Richard Wagner and Richard Strauss: Arias, with René Kollo, Orchestra of the Deutsche Oper Berlin, 1992

For Unitel Classica

- Richard Strauss: Arabella. Live recording of Salzburg Easter Festival 2014. DVD and Blu-ray with Renée Fleming, Thomas Hampson, Hanna-Elisabeth Müller, Daniel Behle. Stage director: Florentine Klepper, Sächsischer Staatsopernchor and Staatskapelle Dresden. Unitel Classica, September 2014.

== TV and film productions ==
=== Productions about Thielemann ===
- Christian Thielemann, documentary film, Germany, 2012, directed by Mathias Siebert, produced by Bremedia Produktion, Radio Bremen, MDR, in the serial Deutschland, deine Künstler.
- Christian Thielemann – Romantischer Querkopf, documentary film by Felix Schmidt, 2007, produced by FTS Media and Unitel, coproduced by Classica
- Through the Night with Christoph Schlingensief and Christian Thielemann (Durch die Nacht mit ...), documentary film, Germany, 2002, directed by: Edda Baumann-von Broen and Daniel Finkernagel, produced by: avanti media, ZDF and arte.

=== Productions with Thielemann ===
- Frederick the Great Remix (Der Große Friedrich Remix – Musik um den Preußenkönig), directed by Friederike Schlumbom, Oktober 18, 2012, Rundfunk Berlin-Brandenburg
- Discovering Beethoven (Beethoven entdecken), documentary TV serial, Germany, Austria, 2011, directed by Christoph Engel and Anca-Monica Pandelea, produced by: Unitel Classica, ORF, ZDF, 3sat
  Joachim Kaiser and Christian Thielemann talk about Beethoven's nine symphonies.

=== Concert records on TV ===
- The Vienna Philharmonic in Beijing (Die Wiener Philharmoniker in Beijing): National Centre for the Performing Arts of Beijing, recording of 3 November 2013, 3sat
- Wagner Birthday Concert: Thielemann conducts the Staatskapelle Dresden (Wagner-Geburtstagskonzert: Thielemann dirigiert die Sächsische Staatskapelle), recording of Mai 21, 2013, directed by: Michael Beyer, ZDF
- Thielemann conducts Strauß (Thielemann dirigiert Strauß): Christian Thielemann and the Vienna Philharmonic, Salzburg Festival 2011, Great Festival Hall, Salzburg, directed by Michael Beyer, 3sat
- Summer Night Music with Christian Thielemann (Sommernachtsmusik mit Christian Thielemann), Christian Thielemann conducts the Munich Philharmonic, Herrenchiemsee Palace, 31 August 2010, directed by Henning Kasten, ZDF and Arte

== Awards ==
- 2003: Order of Merit of the Federal Republic of Germany (Bundesverdienstkreuz)
- 2011: Honorary doctorate from Hochschule für Musik Franz Liszt, Weimar
- 2011: Honorary membership (HonRAM) in the Royal Academy of Music, London
- 2012: Honorary doctorate from the KU Leuven, Belgium
- 2015: Richard Wagner Award (Richard-Wagner-Preis)
- 2024: Honorary membership of Vienna Philharmonic

== Publications ==
- Kilian Heck; Christian Thielemann (2006). Friedrichstein. Das Schloss der Grafen von Dönhoff in Ostpreußen. Munich/Berlin: Deutscher Kunstverlag. ISBN 978-3-422-06593-2.
- Christian Thielemann, Mein Leben mit Wagner. Munich: Beck, 2012, ISBN 978-3-406-63446-8
  - My Life with Wagner. Translated by Anthea Bell. London: Weidenfeld & Nicolson. 2015. ISBN 978-1-780-22837-2.
- Christian Thielemann, Meine Reise zu Beethoven. Munich: Beck, 2020, ISBN 978-3-406-75765-5
