= Richard Wagner Foundation =

German classical music foundation

The Richard Wagner Foundation (in German Richard-Wagner-Stiftung) was formed in 1973, when, faced with overwhelming criticism and infighting amongst the descendants of Richard Wagner, the Bayreuth Festival and its assets were transferred to the newly created Foundation. The board of directors included members of the Wagner family and others appointed by the state.

The Wagner family handed over the Festspielhaus and the Richard Wagner Archive to the Foundation and donated Wagner's villa Wahnfried to the town of Bayreuth. In 1976 the National Archive of the Richard Wagner Foundation (formerly known as the Richard Wagner Family Archive or Wahnfried Archive), was deposited with the Foundation.

In 2008 the Foundation's 24 board members, mostly descendants of Wagner, selected Katharina Wagner and her sister Eva Wagner-Pasquier to lead the Bayreuth Festival following the decision of Wolfgang Wagner to stand down.
