= Woldemar Nelsson =

Russian conductor

Woldemar Nelsson Вольдемар Германович Нельсон
- Born: April 4, 1938
- Died: November 7, 2006 (aged 68) München, Germany
- Occupation: Conductor

Woldemar Nelsson (Note: Russian: Вольдемар Германович Нельсон, romanized: Voldemar Germanovich Nelson) (4 April 1938 in Klintsy – 7 November 2006 in München) was a Russian conductor who was active in West Germany and numerous other countries from 1976 onwards.

== Life and work ==
Woldemar Nelsson came from a Jewish family of musicians; his father was a conductor and composer. Before the war, the family lived in Kyiv, then in Oryol. Initially trained as a violinist, Nelsson played in the Novosibirsk Symphony Orchestra for 15 years. Later, Nelsson studied conducting at the Academy of Music in Novosibirsk and at the master schools in Moscow and Leningrad.

After winning 2nd prize in the 3rd Moscow All-Union Competition in 1971 after completing his conducting exams, chief conductor Kirill Kondrashin engaged him for three years as assistant and conductor of the Moscow Philharmonic. From then on, Nelsson worked with numerous great Soviet orchestras and musicians such as David Oistrakh, Mstislav Rostropovich, Leonid Kogan, Gidon Kremer, Natalia Gutman, Eliso Virsaladze and Oleg Kagan, as well as with composers such as Arvo Pärt and Alfred Schnittke.

In 1976, Nelsson decided to leave for the West with his family. In Rome he received an invitation to take over a tour of the Hamburg NDR Symphony Orchestra at short notice. After the success of this tour, Nelsson continued his work in Germany and found his second home there.

He performed with pianists such as Annie Fischer, Krystian Zimerman, Andrej Hoteev and Nelson Freire, and with string soloists such as Nathan Milstein, Henryk Szeryng, Pinchas Zukerman, Salvatore Accardo and Yuri Bashmet. In sometimes close friendships he worked with composers such as Krzysztof Penderecki and Hans Werner Henze, as well as with directors such as Wolfgang Wagner, Harry Kupfer, Götz Friedrich and Pier Luigi Pizzi. In 1980, Wolfgang Wagner invited him to Bayreuth for the Richard Wagner Festival. Until 1985, Nelsson conducted the operas Lohengrin and Der fliegende Holländer in Bayreuth. Both productions were recorded for radio, television, video and CD.

From 1980 to 1987, Nelsson was musical director at the Staatstheater Kassel, where he rehearsed the complete Der Ring des Nibelungen in addition to an extensive repertoire. In 1986 Herbert von Karajan brought him to the Salzburg Festival, where Nelsson conducted the world premiere of Krzysztof Penderecki's opera The Black Mask. Nelsson also conducted the first performance of the work at the Vienna State Opera. In parallel, he worked as a permanent guest conductor at the Württemberg State Theatre in Stuttgart, where he conducted the world premiere of Hans Werner Henze's ballet Orpheus in March 1979, followed by guest performances in the USA, including at the Metropolitan Opera in New York.

From 1987 to 1994, Nelsson served as musical director at Opera Forum in the Netherlands and as chief conductor of the Royal Opera in Copenhagen. In 1996, Nelsson was appointed chief conductor of the Teatro Verdi in Trieste, where he studied Verdi's Don Carlos and Wagner's Rheingold, among other works. The gala concert he conducted for the reopening of the Teatro Verdi was broadcast live by RAI on radio and television.

From 2000, on grounds of ill health, Nelsson lived mainly in Italy, where he served as principal guest conductor of the Orchestra Filarmonica Marchigiana from 2004 to 2006. He was a co-founder of the International Oleg Kagan Music Festival in Wildbad Kreuth, where he served as artistic director (together with Natalia Gutman) in the beginning, and where he also conducted his last concert, Shostakovich's 14th Symphony, in July 2006.

== Opera and Concerts ==
Nelsson performed with over 100 symphony orchestras around the world. He conducted the Berlin, Vienna and Munich Philharmonic orchestras, the London Symphony and Philharmonic orchestras, the Rotterdam Philharmonic Orchestra, the City of Birmingham Symphony Orchestra, and the radio symphony orchestras in Berlin, Stuttgart and Cologne. He worked with the Czech Philharmonic and Prague Symphony orchestras, the Swedish and Finnish Radio Symphony orchestras, the Stockholm and Helsinki Philharmonic orchestras, the Orchestre de Paris, the Bamberg and Vienna Symphony orchestras, the Montreal Symphony Orchestra and the Orchestre de la Suisse Romande, the symphony orchestras of the Italian RAI in Turin, Milan, Rome and Naples, with the Santa Cecilia Orchestra Rome, New Japan Philharmonic Tokyo, with the orchestra of the Jeunesses Musicales with a subsequent tour of Korea and Southeast Asia, and with many other orchestras.

Among the opera houses where Nelsson gave guest performances were the Vienna State Opera, the Hamburg State Opera, Opéra de Lyon, Welsh National Opera, Teatro Comunale di Firenze, Teatro Liceu in Barcelona, Opéra-Comique and Théâtre du Châtelet in Paris, Opéra national du Rhin in Strasbourg, Grand Théâtre de Genève, as well as various opera houses in New York, Philadelphia, Washington, Toulouse, Mannheim, Bonn, etc. Nelsson also appeared as guest conductor at many music festivals in the USA, Italy, Germany, Austria, Switzerland, etc.

== Acknowledgment ==
I remember Woldemar not only as a genuine and wonderful musician. To me he always was a real and warmhearted friend whose advice (in music and in life) often helped us to find the right solution. Woldemar and Music – as well as Woldemar and Gala – remain partnerships we still can hold onto searching for love and ideals.

— Gidon Kremer

== Bibliography ==
- Alain Pâris: Klassische Musik im 20. Jahrhundert (= dtv 32501). 2nd edition. dtv, München 1997, ISBN 3-423-32501-1, p. 557.
