= Falk Struckmann =

German opera singer

Falk Struckmann (German: [ˈfalk ˈʃtʁʊkman]; born 1958 in Heilbronn, West Germany) is an operatic bass-baritone, particularly prominent in the Wagnerian repertoire.

A Kammersänger of the Vienna State Opera, he made his debut there as Orest in Elektra on 13 September 1991. In addition to his frequent appearances in Vienna, he has sung at the Bayreuth and Salzburg festivals and in many of the world's major opera houses, including the Gran Teatre del Liceu in Barcelona, the Berlin State Opera, the Royal Opera House, Covent Garden, and the Paris Opera. He made his debut at the New York Metropolitan Opera in the title role of Wozzeck on 10 February 1997, returning there as Telramund in Lohengrin (1998), Abimélech in Samson et Dalila (2000), Don Pizarro in Fidelio (2000), Amfortas in Parsifal (2003), and Iago in Otello (2012).

His recordings include: the role of Orest in Elektra (Berlin Staatskapelle Orchestra and Chorus, conducted by Daniel Barenboim); Bartók's Bluebeard's Castle (Radio-Sinfonie-Orchester Frankfurt, conducted by Eliahu Inbal); Kurwenal in Tristan und Isolde (Bayreuther Festspiele 1995, conducted by Daniel Barenboim, filmed); Amfortas in Parsifal (Vienna State Opera Orchestra and Chorus, conducted by Christian Thielemann) and the Dutchman in The Flying Dutchman (Berlin Staatskapelle Orchestra and Chorus, conducted by Daniel Barenboim).
