= Gottfried Wagner =

German publicist

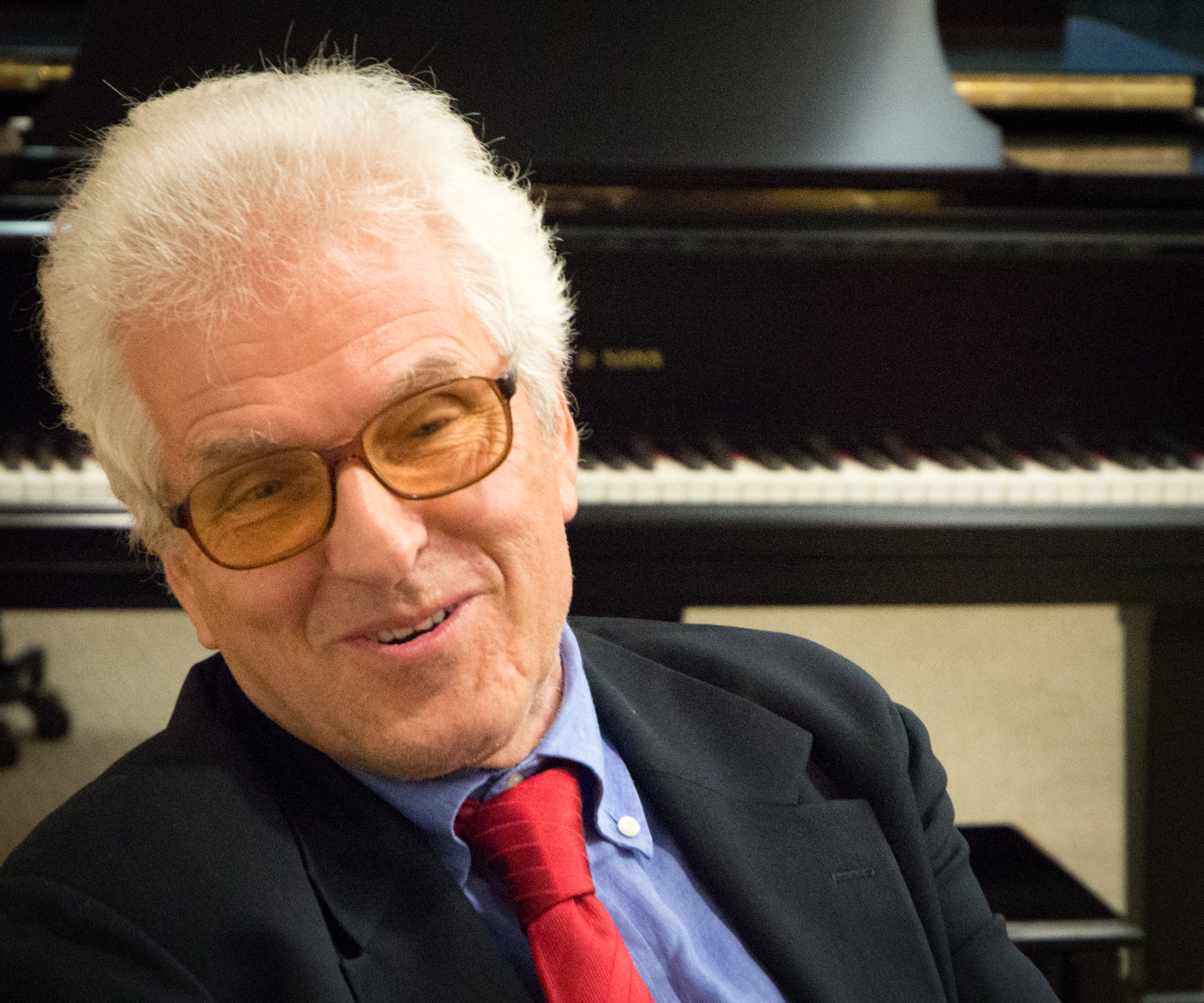
- Gottfried Wagner at Boston University, October 2013
- Born: 13 April 1947 (age 79); Bayreuth, Germany
- Citizenship: Germany, Italy
- Education: PhD
- Alma mater: University of Vienna
- Occupations: Multimedia director and publicist
- Spouse: Teresina Wagner
- Children: Eugenio
- Parent(s): Wolfgang Wagner and Ellen Drexel
- Relatives: see Wagner family tree

Gottfried Wagner (born 13 April 1947 in Bayreuth) is a multimedia director and publicist.

Gottfried Wagner is the son of Wolfgang Wagner and a great-grandchild of Richard Wagner. His PhD is about Kurt Weill and Bertolt Brecht. He has concentrated on German culture and politics, as well as Jewish history of the 19th and 20th centuries in numerous publications. He is a member of the PEN-Club Liechtenstein and in 1992 was a co-founder of the Post-Holocaust Discussion Group.

He has been living in Italy since 1983, and has estranged himself from his father's family, openly criticising their involvement with the Nazi regime. His book Twilight of the Wagners: The Unveiling of a Family's Legacy, an autobiography, queried the extent to which his father had extricated himself from the family's close connection to National Socialism, while he has also been critical of many aspects of the Bayreuth Festival. The British film director Tony Palmer has made a two-hour documentary film about the Wagner family in which Gottfried plays a key role.

== Publications ==
- Gottfried Wagner, Wer nicht mit dem Wolf heult. Autobiographische Aufzeichnungen eines Wagner-Urenkels. (He who does not howl with the wolf: Autobiographical Notes from a Wagner Great-Grandchild) Foreword by Ralph Giordano. Verlag Kiepenheuer & Witsch, Cologne 1997. ISBN 3-462-02622-4
- Gottfried Wagner, Twilight of the Wagners: The Unveiling of a Family's Legacy, Picador, 1999. ISBN 0-312-26404-6 (English version of the above)
- Gottfried Wagner "Du sollst keine anderen Götter haben neben mir. Richard Wagner - Ein Minenfeld", Propyläen, 2013. ISBN 978-3-549-07441-1

== See also ==
- Wagner family tree

== Sources ==
- Much of the information in this article comes from the German-language Wikipedia article.
