= Katharina Wagner =

German opera stage director (born 1978)

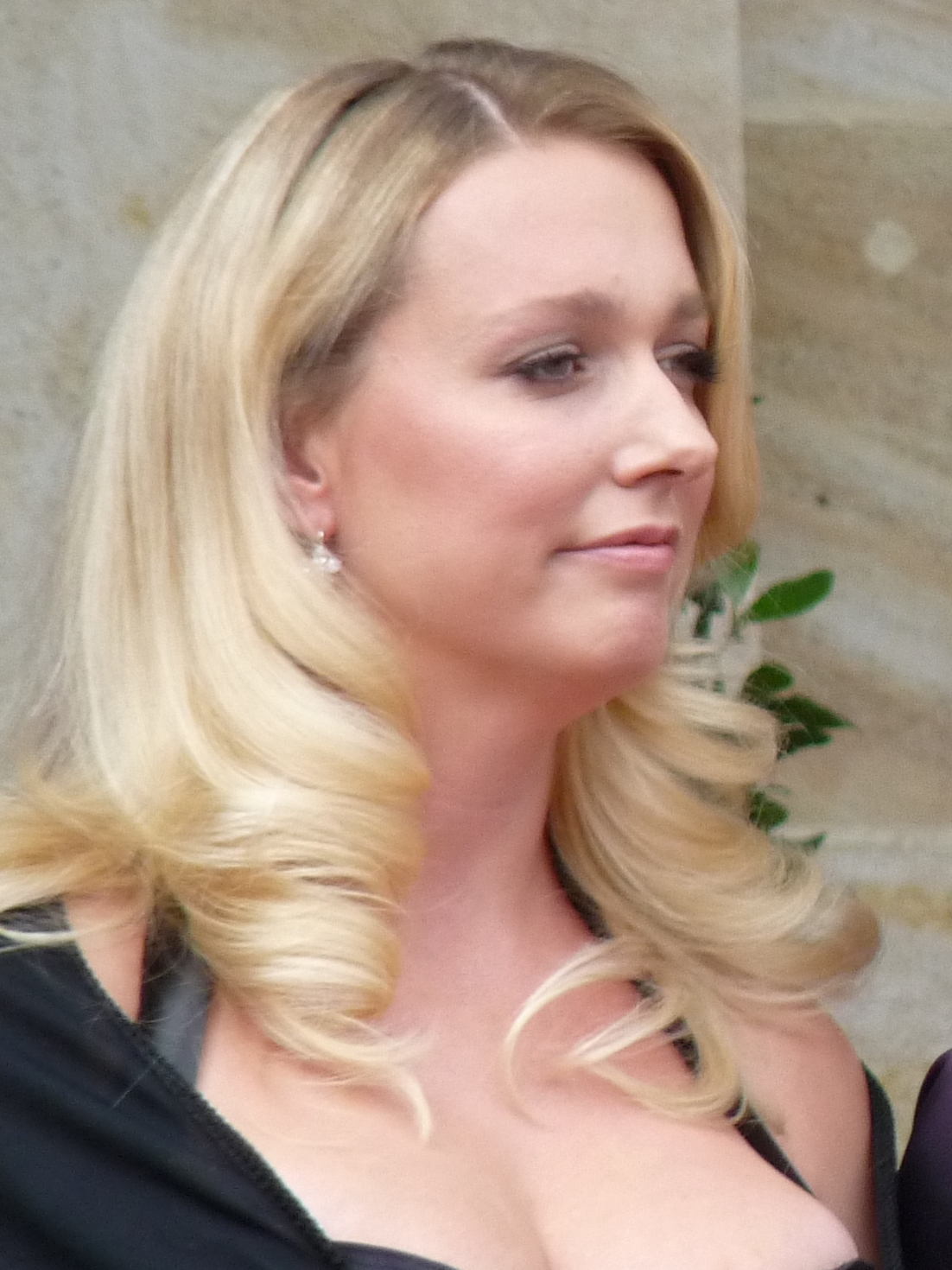
Katharina Wagner in 2009.

Katharina Wagner (born 21 May 1978 in Bayreuth) is a German opera stage director and is the director of the Bayreuth Festival. She is the daughter of Wolfgang Wagner and Gudrun Wagner (née Armann), great-granddaughter of Richard Wagner, and great-great granddaughter of Hungarian composer Franz Liszt.

== Career ==
Wagner has staged Der fliegende Holländer in Würzburg and Lohengrin in Budapest. Her directorial début at the Bayreuth Festival, staging a production of Richard Wagner's Die Meistersinger von Nürnberg in July 2007, was booed at its premiere, but established a following which returned to watch the production evolve as Wagner made changes in each of the five years it was on view. Wagner also took a bow after every performance, with audiences split between bravas and boos.

On 1 September 2008, Katharina Wagner was named, together with her half-sister Eva Wagner-Pasquier, the new director of the Bayreuth Festival by the Richard Wagner Foundation, succeeding their father Wolfgang. This followed an extended family dispute. They were chosen in preference to their cousin Nike Wagner and the Belgian opera director and administrator Gerard Mortier, who had placed a late joint bid for the directorship on 24 August.

In October 2010, Wagner planned to visit Israel in order to invite the Israel Chamber Orchestra to play a concert in July 2011 at the Bayreuth town hall, to end a post-1945 boycott of Wagner's music in Israel. Her visit was canceled after hostility from Holocaust survivors.

In 2014 it was announced that Eva would be stepping down from the co-directorship leaving, in accord with her father's will, Katharina in sole charge.

In April 2020 it was announced that Katharina would have to step down from her position as director of the festival until further notice because of an unspecified long-term illness. The 81-year-old, former commercial managing director, Heinz-Dieter Sense, acted as a temporary representative for Wagner in the following months. This was the first time since Heinz Tietjen in the 1930s that a non-family member had been in charge of the festival. Katharina returned to work in September 2020.

== Productions ==
- Der fliegende Holländer (Würzburg)
- Lohengrin (Budapest)
- Die Meistersinger von Nürnberg (Bayreuth)
- Rienzi (Bremen)
- Tristan und Isolde (Bayreuth)
- Lohengrin (Barcelona, 2020) Katharina's new production, and her debut in Barcelona, was cancelled because of the coronavirus pandemic lockdown in Catalonia

== See also ==
- Wagner family
