= Gudrun Wagner =

Gudrun Wagner (née Armann; 15 June 1944 – 28 November 2007) was the second wife of Wolfgang Wagner, sole director of the Bayreuth Festival since 1967. Her behind-the-scenes influence led her to be considered virtual co-director.

== Biography ==
Wagner was born as Gudrun Armann in Allenstein, East Prussia. She grew up in Lower Bavaria near Regensburg, where she was moved at the age of four weeks because of World War II. She worked as a secretary in the press department of the Bayreuth Festival from 1965. In 1970 she married Dietrich Mack, editor of Cosima Wagner's diary. She later became the assistant of Wolfgang Wagner, the grandson of Richard Wagner and director of the Bayreuth Festival which the composer founded.

She and Wolfgang Wagner each divorced their spouses in order to marry each other in 1976. Their daughter Katharina, who succeeded her father as co-director of the festival, was born in 1978.

Although officially keeping a low profile, she exercised influence on the festival from behind the scenes. Wolfgang Wagner's attempt in 2001 to install his wife as successor did not pass a vote of the board of the festival foundation.

She had been recovering from an operation in hospital in Bayreuth when she died aged 63.

== See also ==
- Wagner family tree
