= Beethovenfest =

Annual classical music event in Bonn, Germany

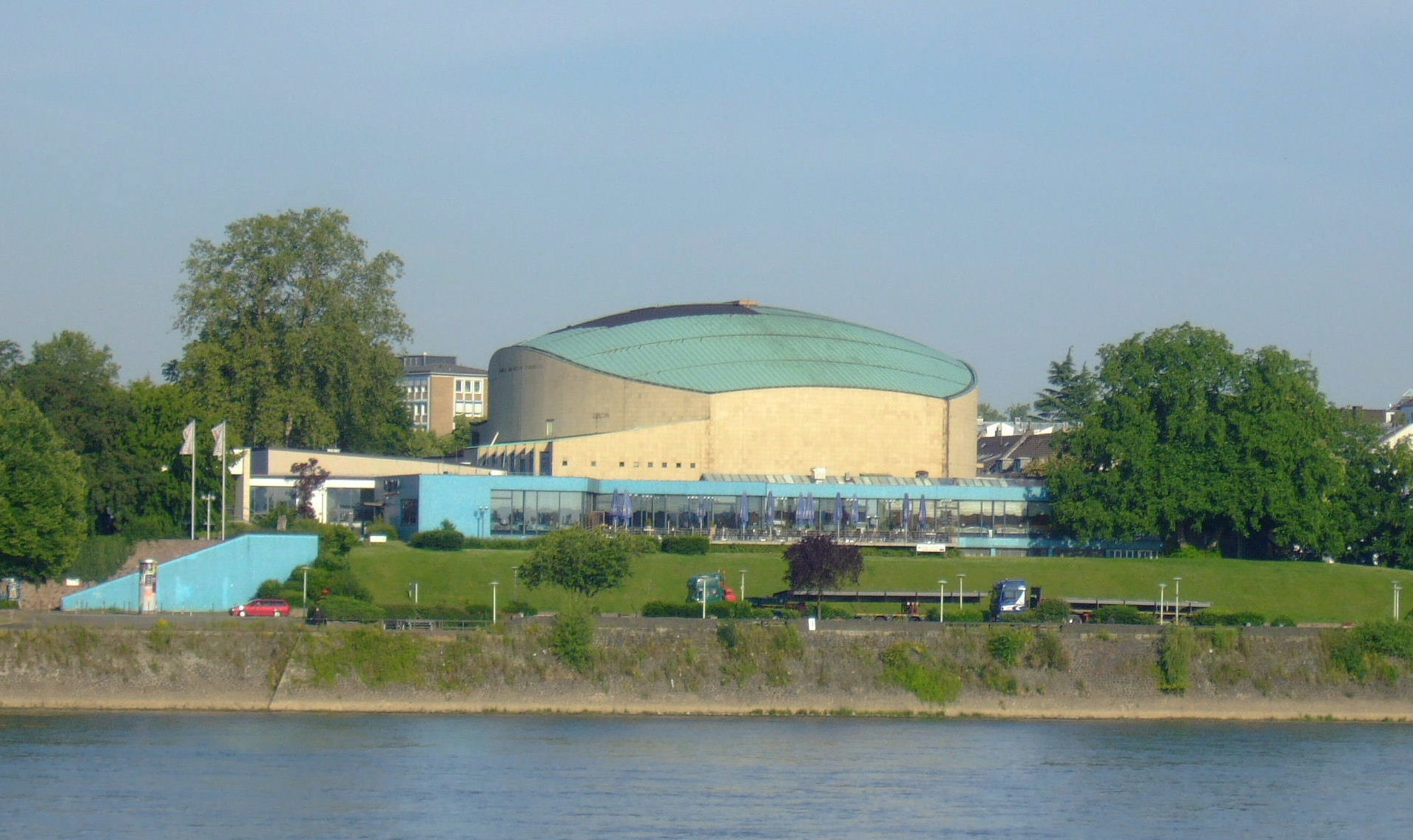
- The Beethovenhalle where most concerts take place
- Genre: mostly music by Beethoven
- Frequency: annual
- Locations: Bonn and the region
- Inaugurated: 1845; 181 years ago
- People: Nike Wagner
- Website: www.beethovenfest.de

The Beethovenfest ('Beethoven Festival') is an annual festival of classical music in Bonn, Germany, focused on the music of Ludwig van Beethoven. It dates back to 1845, when the composer's 75th anniversary of birth was celebrated with unveiling his monument and performing major works. It is held in Beethoven's hometown, and hosts concerts of international orchestras, ensembles and soloists around Bonn.

== History ==
The Beethovenfest was first held in 1845, when a festival of three days celebrated the 75th anniversary of the composer's birth in Bonn. The Beethoven monument was unveiled on 12 August 1845, as part of the festivities, which were attended by the Prussian king Friedrich Wilhelm IV, the British Queen Victoria, Alexander von Humboldt, and Hector Berlioz. Among the conductors were Franz Liszt and Louis Spohr, who conducted the Missa solemnis and the Ninth Symphony. In 1894, all nine symphonies were performed at the festival for the first time.

Around 1931, the festival began to be held annually, but was taken over by the Nazis. After World War II, the town took up the responsibility for the festival.

From 1947, it was held biennially, with chamber music performed during off years. The present Beethovenhalle, in which most concerts take place, opened in 1959. The structure is the third structure built after two wooden structures of the same name.

From 1974, the festival was held every three years, in which music by Beethoven was paired with contemporary compositions. Starting from 1998, Beethovenfest became annual and collaborated with the broadcaster Deutsche Welle. The festival cooperates with the Beethoven Orchester Bonn, the Bonn Opera and the Beethoven-Haus.

In 2015, the festival was directed by Nike Wagner for the first time. She dropped several Beethoven symphonies from the program, including the Ninth, while placing more emphasis on chamber music.

The theme of the 2016 festival was revolutions, presented in 59 performances at 23 venues in Bonn and surrounding areas. It was opened by the Czech Philharmonic with violinist Hilary Hahn. It highlighted the French and the Russian Revolutions and had more music from France and Russia programmed. Beethoven's opera Fidelio was complemented by another Rettungsoper (rescue opera), Cherubini's Les deux journées conducted by Christoph Spering.

== The main focus of the festival ==
=== 2005 ===
The festival took place from 8 September until 2 October. The theme was Liberté - the keyword of the enlightenment and battle cry of the French Revolution. After the Bohemian-Moravian focus in the previous year, the organizers emphasise this time on the relation between Beethoven and French music. In 64 events and an extensive schedule, the festival offered an insight of major importance, which had revolutionary ideas and changes on Beethoven and his music, but emphasised the creativity of the French composers such as Hector Berlioz, Claude Debussy and Maurice Ravel.

=== 2006 ===
The Beethovenfest took place in Bonn from 31 August until 1 October. The program was themed Russia.

=== 2007 ===
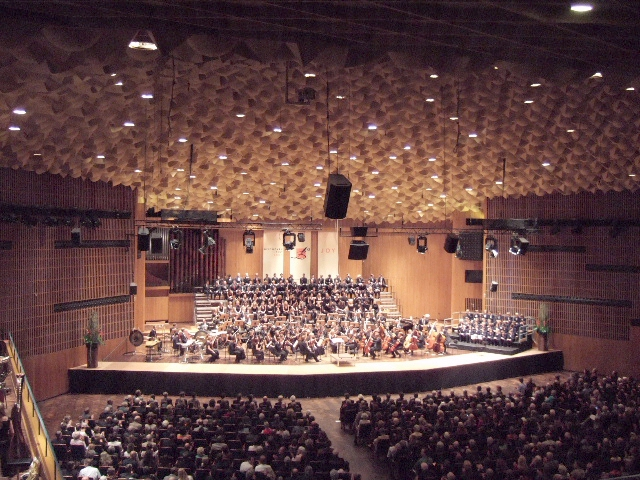
Concert in the Beethovenhalle during the Beethovenfest in 2007

The Beethovenfest Bonn took place in 2007 from 24 August to 23 September. The organizers dedicated it to the music nation of Great Britain. The festival was themed Joy. Ludwig van Beethoven's relation with Great Britain was based to a large extent on old Bonn relations: Ferdinand Ries, born in Bonn like Beethoven and one of the Beethoven's piano students in Vienna, went to London in 1813 as a celebrated pianist. Later he became one of the directors of the London Philharmonic Society, which in 1822 commissioned Beethoven's Ninth Symphony.

British ensembles such as the BBC Symphony Orchestra, the Academy of St Martin in the Fields or the Philharmonia Orchestra of London performed in Bonn. Also the War Requiem by Benjamin Britten was part of the program. In addition, some discoveries were announced, such as a selection of Beethoven's Scottish, Irish and Welsh songs, which were rarely performed.

On 2 September, the opera Freax by Moritz Eggert premiered at the festival.

=== 2008 ===
The Beethovenfest took place this year from 29 August to 28 September in Beethoven's birthplace. Power. Music. - this was the theme of the festival including 60 concerts based on Beethoven's political legacy, the ideological appropriation and exclusion of classical music composers and their works in the 20th century. The Beethoven's works, which he wrote with political and social connotations, were heard. On the one hand, these were juxtaposed with compositions that arose as a reaction to political currents; on the other hand, the 2008 edition of the Beethovenfest was dedicated to out-of-date composers whose music was produced, inter alia, in Theresienstadt and works that are in the context of exile and persecution.

Top-class musicians such as Hélène Grimaud, Annette Dasch, Claudia Barainsky, Daniel Hope, Martin Grubinger and András Schiff, Max Raabe and The Princes performed, and from the acting industry Esther Schweins, Hannelore Elsner, Christoph Waltz, Ulrich Matthes and Hanns Zischler.

In addition, top orchestras performed at the Beethovenfest Bonn 2008, such as the New York Philharmonic Orchestra, Lorin Maazel conducting, the London Symphony Orchestra conducted by Daniel Harding, the National Orchestra of France, conducted by Kurt Masur, the Gewandhaus Orchestra, conductor Riccardo Chailly, the Deutsche Kammerphilharmonie Bremen, Paavo Järvi conducting, and the Bamberg Symphony conducted by Jonathan Nott.

=== 2009 ===
The Beethovenfest took place from 4 September to 3 October 2009. In the Light was the theme of the festival this year. "Beethoven's influence coined not only the music of the Romantic period, in which almost all musical genres are based on Beethoven's work," wrote the artistic director of the Beethovenfest, Ilona Schmiel. "Likewise, during Beethoven's lifetime, the soloist developed as an increasingly independent musical personality. This was the starting point for the artistic ideal of the Romantic period: the cult of the stars and genius that characterizes our music world today."

In this context, the theme In the Light means that the focus is on artistic positions. The 2009 programm of the festival included artists such as Paavo Järvi and The Deutsche Kammerphilharmonie Bremen, Kent Nagano, Ingo Metzmacher, Sol Gabetta, Valery Gergiev, Gustavo Dudamel and Maurizio Pollini.

=== 2010 ===
The Beethovenfest took place in 2010 from 10 September to 9 October and was themed Open - utopia and freedom in music. José Antonio Abreu, founder of the Venezuelan "El Sistema", the national system of youth and children's orchestras of Venezuela, had the patronage. The Federal Chancellery could be used as a venue for a concert for the first time.

As part of the Bavarian State Orchestra's concert from 12 September, the conductor Kent Nagano received the Wilhelm Furtwängler Prize of the Beethovenfest Bonn.

=== 2011 ===
In the Liszt year, the Beethovenfest looked back on its long tradition: in 1845 Franz Liszt organized a three-day music festival for the inauguration of the Beethoven monument on Münsterplatz on the occasion of the 75th birthday of the composer. In 2011, the festival took place from 10 September to 9 October. It was under the theme Future music. Beethoven, Liszt and the New in music.

=== 2012 ===
Under the theme Obstinacy. On the True in Art, the Beethovenfest took place in 2012 from 7 September to 7 October. The focus was on musicians who, like Beethoven, are ahead of time with their ideas and are undaunted on their own way. With these border crossers, many of whom have been closely associated with the festival for years, the Beethovenfest is developing exclusive programs.

=== 2013 ===
The 2013 edition of the Beethovenfest took place from 5 September to 5 October. The 67 individual events were under the theme Transformations. The main program included an open-air concert, in which Otto Sauter and his trumpet ensemble Ten of the Best & Friends translated well-known melodies from operas into American and Caribbean styles during the Richard Wagner anniversary year, as well as an English promenade concert with soprano Miah Persson and for the first time NDR Youth Symphony Orchestra conducted by its founder Thomas Hengelbrock.

=== 2014 ===
The 2014 Beethovenfest was held under the motto "Götterfunken" (Divine Spark). From 6 September to 6 October, 60 events aimed to illustrate how music touches the audience and what it can inspire listeners to do—showing how the "divine spark" leaps across. This motto concluded a three-year exploration that began in 2012 by focusing on the artist—"Eigensinn" (Willfulness)—and continued in 2013 by examining the processes of transformation undergone by both artist and work—"Verwandlungen" (Transformations).

=== 2015 ===
The 2015 Beethovenfest took place from 4 September to 4 October, featuring 54 events under the motto "Veränderungen" (Changes). It was the first Beethovenfest curated under the leadership of Nike Wagner. In addition to major orchestral works, the program highlighted the "Diabelli Variations" and, for the first time, included dance theater with choreography by Sidi Larbi Cherkaoui, Saburo Teshigawara, and Stephanie Thiersch.

=== 2019 ===
The 2019 Beethovenfest took place from 6 September to 29 September under the motto "Mondschein" (Moonlight).

=== 2020 ===
The subsequent Beethovenfest was planned to take place in two parts to mark the 250th anniversary of Beethoven's birth. Events under the motto "Seid umschlungen" (Be Embraced) were scheduled for 13–22 March 2020. They had been deliberately scheduled for March—the month of Beethoven's death—but had to be cancelled on 11 March 2020, due to the COVID-19 pandemic.

The second part was scheduled for 4–27 September 2020, but was largely cancelled on 5 May 2020, due to the pandemic. Only a concert without an audience in Cologne Cathedral and an artistic tour of the construction site at the Beethoven Hall—undergoing renovation at the time— took place.

=== 2021 ===
Most of the events cancelled in 2020 were rescheduled for the 2021 Beethovenfest, held from 20 August to 10 September 2021. The motto "Auferstehn, ja, auferstehn" ("Rise again, yes, rise again"—the opening lines of a poem by Friedrich Gottlieb Klopstock) was intended to convey the sense of optimism the festival sought to radiate. The main program comprised 53 concerts, supplemented by 22 performances in the Post Tower lounge. For the first time, seven festival concerts were streamed worldwide via YouTube. Echoing the festival's motto once more, the three-week event concluded with the Mahler Chamber Orchestra performing Mahler’s "Resurrection" Symphony, followed by a choral finale based on Klopstock’s poem.

=== 2022 ===
The 2022 Beethovenfest—held under the title "Alle Menschen" ("All People") and marking the debut of Steven Walter as artistic director—took place from 25 August to 17 September 2022.

=== 2023 ===
The Beethovenfest, themed “Music about Life,” took place from 31 August to 24 September 2023, focusing on nature and sustainability issues. Steven Walter was again the artistic director.

=== 2024 ===
In 2024, the Beethovenfest was themed "Together," with Sven Walter once again serving as artistic director. The events took place from 5 September to 3 October 2024. The closing ceremony on German Unity Day was held as a "Music Festival of Democracy" in the government district , marking the 75th anniversary of the Basic Law for the Federal Republic of Germany.

=== 2025 ===
In 2025, the festival's motto was "Alles ultra"; it ran from 28 August to 27 September 2025.

=== 2026 ===
In 2026, the motto of the Beethovenfest was “Crossing Boundaries.” Four Fellows presented their own projects. Elsa Artmann presented performances that blended physical theatre and dance , merging spoken and sung words with movement. Martha Bijlsma and her piano quartet, Flex Ensemble, expanded the boundaries of chamber music through archival research, film, and music . Brittany J. Green composed music that intertwines electronic and instrumental soundscapes. Momi Maiga combines the West African musical tradition of the kora with jazz, flamenco, pop, and classical music.
