= Antoine Wagner =

American-French visual artist

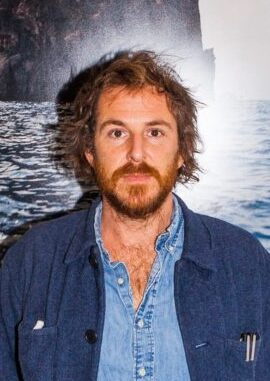
- Antoine Wagner, in 2017
- Born: Antoine Amadeus Wagner-Pasquier; 1982 (age 43–44)
- Education: BA Theatre, Northwestern University, BA Political Science, Northwestern University, Film Studies, Tisch School of the Arts
- Known for: Photography, Film
- Website: www.antoinewagner.com

Antoine Amadeus Wagner-Pasquier (/ˈvɑːɡnər/ VAHG-nər, French: [ɑ̃twan vaɡnɛʁ]; 1982) is an American-French visual artist. He works between Woodstock, NY, and Paris, France. His work uses visual language drawn from nature, which refers to mythological narratives and the sublime.

== Early life and education ==
Wagner was born in Evanston, Illinois. He is the son of German opera manager Eva Wagner-Pasquier, and the great-great-grandson of German composer Richard Wagner and great-great-great-grandson of Franz Liszt. He graduated from Northwestern University, Illinois, and Sciences Po, Paris, with a double bachelor's degree in Theatre and Political Science in 2005.

He continued his education in film at the School of Continuing and Professional Studies at New York University's Tisch School of the Arts in 2007.

== Early work ==
In 2006, Wagner assisted director Michael Haneke on Funny Games.

After his first site-specific installation Lisz[:T:]raumin in Raiding, Austria, in 2007, he directed videos and documentaries exploring visual inspiration in music. His film From a Mess to the Masses (2011) reveals the genesis of the visual creation of the band Phoenix.

Wagner: A Genius in Exile (2013) is a documentary revealing the landscapes that influenced Richard Wagner during his Swiss exile.

In 2013, VfmK Verlag für moderne Kunst published Wagner in der Schweiz, a photographic essay exploring Richard Wagner's inspiration during his forced journey from Germany to Switzerland after the 1848 revolution. It was awarded the 2013 Prix de l'Académie Lyrique Pierre Bergé in Paris.

== Artwork ==
Wagner's mediums include video, sound, sculpture, performance and photography, which he exhibits through installations, site-specific projects, film, monumental photography and opera. Through the visual language of nature, his work references music, mythology and the romantic.

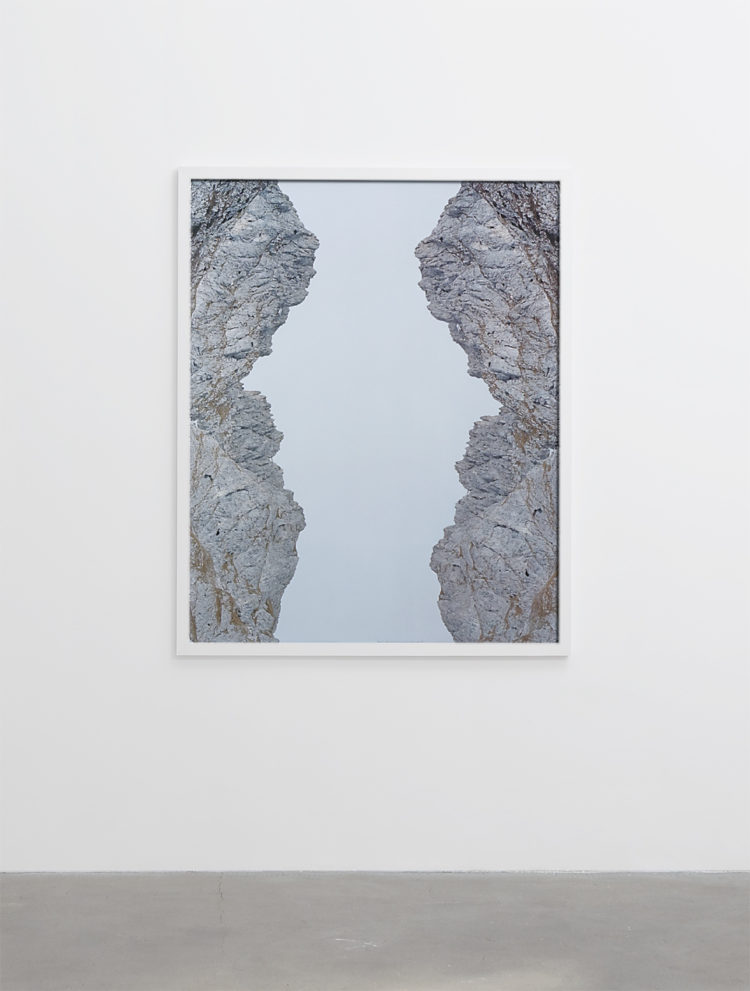
Antoine Wagner, Interference #1, (2016)

Wagner's multifaceted practice has created an entire visual language to engage the audience in communicating with nature. Abstract unseen anthropomorphic shapes found in nature and minerals are the main actors of this world of mythologies and cyclical redundancies. Wagner examines the themes of identity, geography and spirituality and offers the viewer an escape from traditional geographic and artistic boundaries.

Through his exhibitions including Exil (Museum am Rothenbaum, 2013), and Kundry (La Filature de Mulhouse 2015), Wagner applied his experience in the moving image to photography, exploring the possibilities of narrative in a silent and motionless environment through large-scale abstract photography.

In 2018, Wagner directed Act II of the Opera Die Walkure at Frank Gehry's New World Center in Miami.

Wagner's site-specific multimedia installation Sentimental Analysis (April 2019) responds to the legend of Ara the Beautiful at the National Gallery of Armenia.

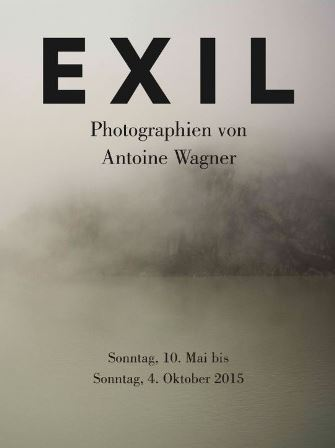
Poster for Exil by Antoine Wagner, shown in 2015

== Exhibitions ==
- 2009: The Open, Group Show, Deitch Projects, New York City.
- 2011: Landscapes Escaped: Henn Gallerie, Munich, Germany.
- 2013–2016: Exil, The Opera Bastille, Paris, 2013; The Bayreuth Festspielhaus, Germany, 2013; Palazzo Vendramin, Venice, Italy, 2013; Museum für Völkerkunde Hamburg, Hamburg, Germany, 2015; Gertrude Salon, New York, 2016; Stedelijk Museum Breda, Breda, Netherlands, 2016;
- 2015: Cadences: La Filature, Mulhouse, France.
- 2015: Wagner in der Schweiz (screening), Goethe-Institut, California, United States.
- 2016: Un Musee Imaginaire, Group Show, Collection Lambert (Collection Lambert), Avignon, France.
- 2016: Common Denominator, Theater St. Gallen, St. Gallen, Switzerland.
- 2016: Bredaphoto, Stedelijk Museum Breda, Breda, Netherlands.
- 2016: Interference, Galerie RM, Paris.
- 2017: Kundry, La Filature de Mulhouse, France.
- 2017: Supersonic, Deck, Singapore.
- 2017: Echo, Julien David, Jinguamae, Tokyo.
- 2017: Silence, Atelier Hermes Pantin, France.
- 2017: Wagner in der Schweiz, Society of the Four Arts, Palm Beach, Florida.
- 2017: Art Paris Art Fair, Grand Palais, Paris.
- 2017: Distortion, Youngfu, Shanghai, China
- 2017: Antoine Wagner, Phillips, Paris
- 2017: Julierpass, Tait memorial Fund with Stuart Skelton, Saint Paul's Church, London
- 2018: Liquid La patinoire, Royal Gallerie Valerie Bach, Bruxelles
- 2018: Looking at sound: Symposium at the Goethe Institut, Tokyo
- 2018: Studies Between Silence: Nancy Nasher, Soluna Music and Arts Festival, Dallas, Texas
- 2018: ACT II - Die Walkure, New World Center, Miami
- 2018: Orient Blue, In Cadaques Festival, Cadaques, Spain
- 2018: Artist talk, Spring Place, New York
- 2018 Morceau Choisi, (group show), Bubenberg Art Paris
- 2019: Conscience of Angel's Landing, Art Paris, Grand Palais Paris,
- 2019: Sentimental Analysis, site-specific multimedia exhibition at the National Gallery of Armenia

== Collections ==
Wagner's work is held in the following permanent collections:

- Yvon Lambert Gallery, Paris
- Museum of Ethnology, Hamburg, Hamburg, Germany

== Filmography ==
Wagner assisted director Michael Haneke on his American remake of Funny Games in 2007.

In 2011, Wagner directed the film From a Mess to the Masses featuring the band Phoenix. Arte and first broadcast in 2011, commissioned the film.

Wagner has directed videos featuring Julien David, Phoenix, Vanessa Paradis, Johnny Hallyday, Kate Moss, Maria Korchetkova, and Spank Rock.

Wagner has also worked as a cinematographer.

== Residencies ==
Wagner has completed residencies at Robert Wilson's Byrd Hoffman Watermill Center, NY (2005), and at The Villa Medici, Rome (2014).

== Publications ==
- Wagner: A Genius in Exile (2013)
- Antoine Wagner: Wagner in der Schweiz (2014). Nürnberg, Moderne Kunst Nürnberg. ISBN 978-3869844572
- Antoine Wagner: Kundry (2015). Gourcuff Grandenigo, Montreuil. ISBN 978-2353402328. With texts by Eric Mezil and Carole Blumenfeld.
- Patrice Chéreau: An Imaginary Museum (2016). Arles: Actes Sud. P. 71–74. ISBN 978-2330050467
- You (2016). ISBN 9492051214.

== See also ==
- Wagner family tree
