= Götz Friedrich =

German opera and theatre director (1930–2000)

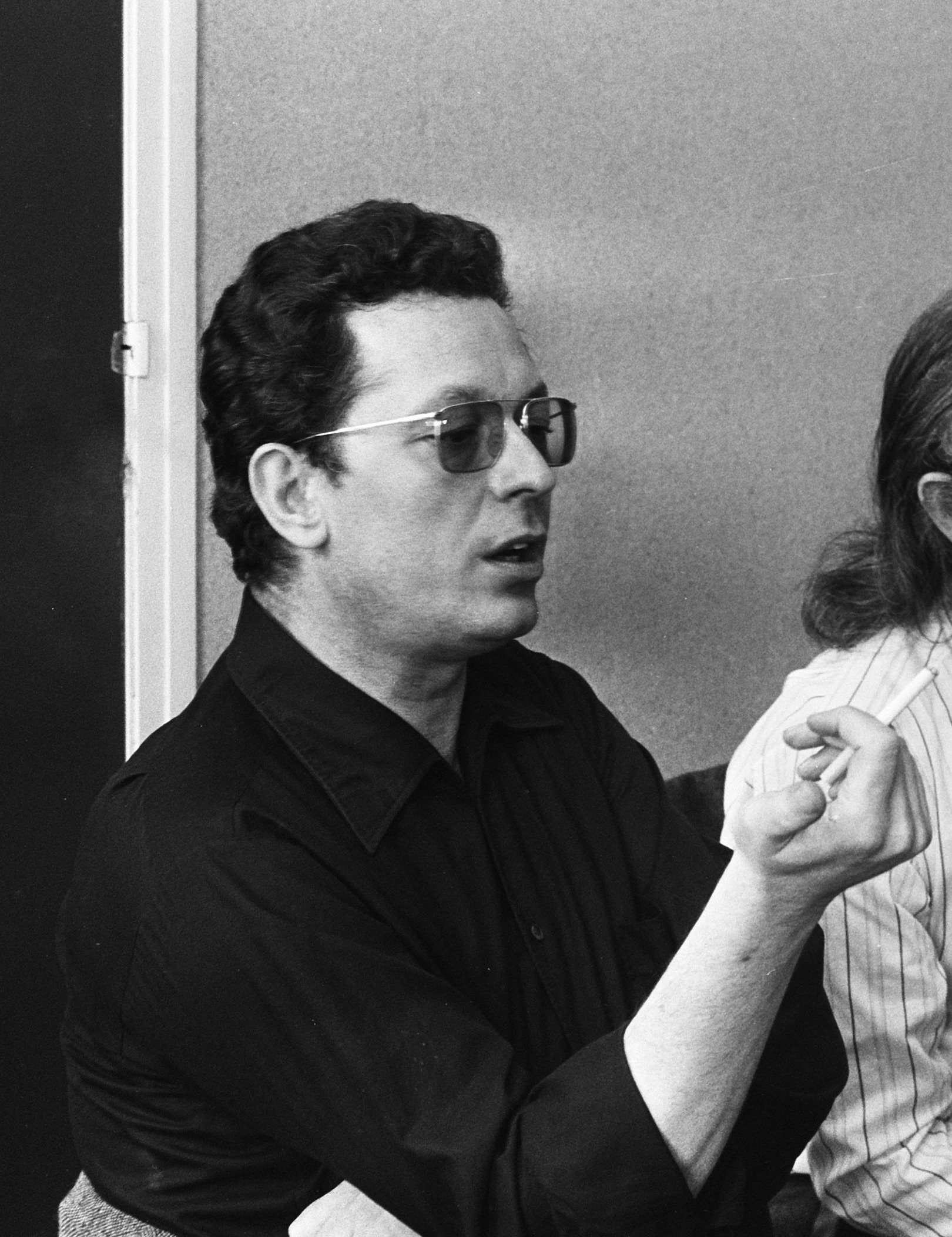
Friedrich in 1975

Götz Friedrich (4 August 1930 in Naumburg, Germany – 12 December 2000 in Berlin, Germany) was a German opera and theatre director.

He was a student and assistant of Walter Felsenstein at the Komische Oper Berlin in (East) Berlin, where he went on to direct his early productions. He first came to international prominence with a controversial 1972 production of Wagner's Tannhäuser at Bayreuth. He defected to the West whilst working on a production of Jenůfa in Stockholm later the same year.

From 1972 to 1981 he was principal director at the Hamburg State Opera. Between 1977 and 1981, he was also director of productions at the Royal Opera House at Covent Garden in London, where he staged the first British performances of the three-act completion of Berg's Lulu. In 1981 he took up the post of general director of the Deutsche Oper Berlin where he stayed until his death in 2000, staging productions across the whole of the operatic repertoire.

He was particularly known for his productions of Wagner. He staged his first production of the Ring at Covent Garden (1973–76, conducted by Colin Davis). The designs by Josef Svoboda centred on a revolving hydraulic platform. In the 1980s he directed a new production for the Deutsche Oper in Berlin (the so-called 'Time Tunnel' Ring). Covent Garden later imported this production to replace a planned production by Yuri Lyubimov, which had been abandoned after Das Rheingold. Bernard Haitink conducted complete cycles of the second Friedrich Ring, in 1992. The production was also staged in Washington and Japan.

In 1976 he directed the world première of Josef Tal's Die Versuchung (The Temptation) in Munich. He directed the world premières of Luciano Berio's Un re in ascolto, Ingvar Lidholm's "Ett Drömspel" and Henze's Raft of the Medusa.

He was the initiator of The American Berlin Opera Foundation (ABOF, now named The Opera Foundation), located in New York City.

Among his productions available on DVD are a 1974 film of Salome (with Teresa Stratas) and a 1981 film of Elektra (with Leonie Rysanek and Astrid Varnay), both conducted by Karl Böhm; a 1979 Falstaff (with Gabriel Bacquier) and a 1992 Die Frau ohne Schatten (with Cheryl Studer and Thomas Moser), both conducted by Sir Georg Solti; and a 1982 Bayreuth production of Lohengrin (with Peter Hofmann and Karan Armstrong), conducted by Woldemar Nelsson. His "controversial" 1972 Bayreuth production of Tannhäuser (with Dame Gwyneth Jones as Elisabeth and Venus) is also available on DVD, as are his Berlin productions of Die tote Stadt (with Armstrong, 1983) and Tristan und Isolde (with René Kollo and Jones, 1993).

== Personal life ==
Friedrich was married to Ruth Maria Kubitschek, with whom he had a son, Alexander. From his marriage to soprano Karan Armstrong, he had another son, Johannes.

== Works ==
=== Film ===
- 1962: Rotkäppchen
- 1974: Salome
- 1981: Elektra (Deutsche Grammophon)
- 1984: Orpheus in the Underworld
