= Eva Wagner-Pasquier =

German opera manager (born 1945)

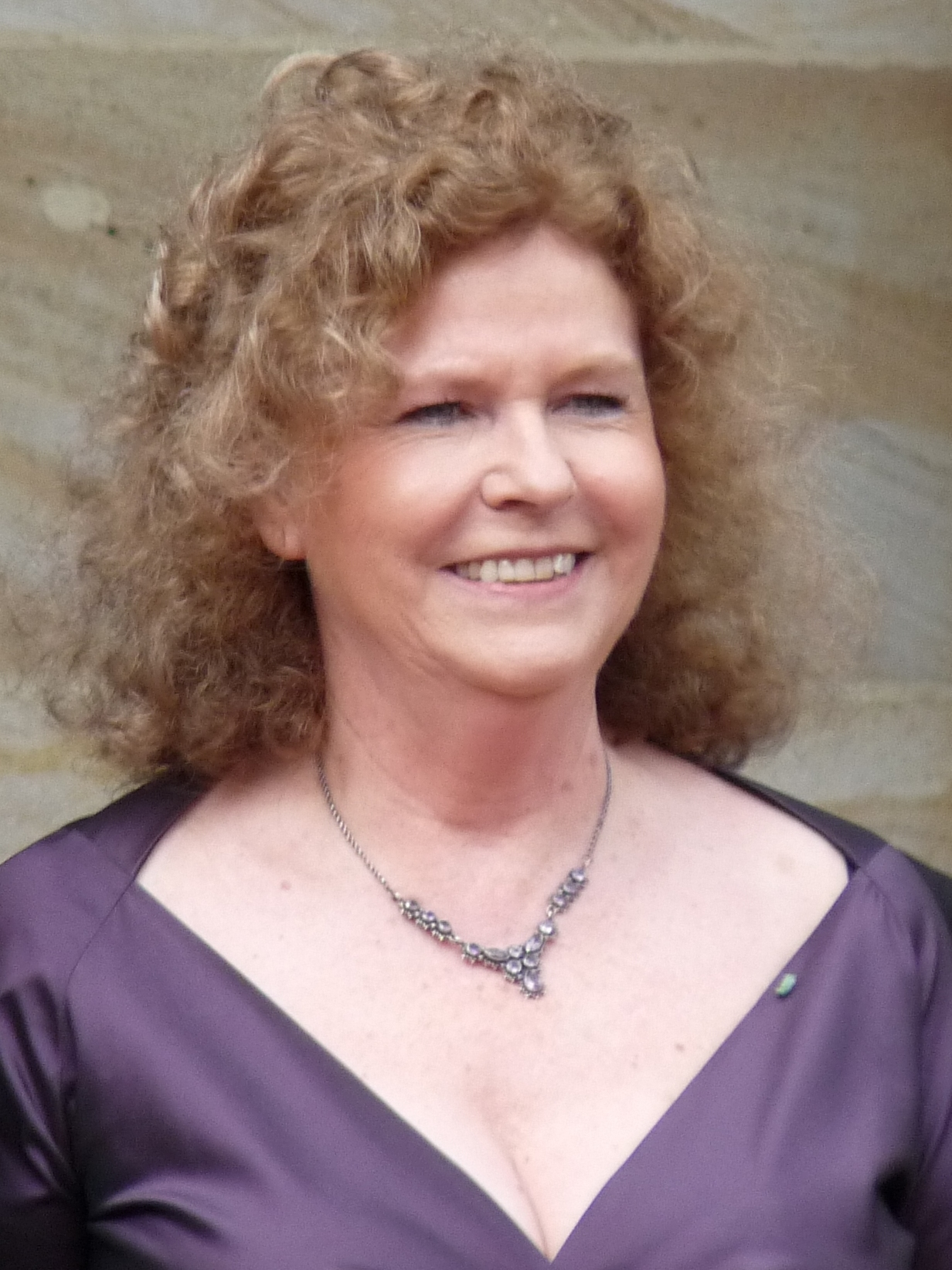
Eva Wagner-Pasquier in 2009.

Eva Wagner-Pasquier (born 14 April 1945, in Oberwarmensteinach) is a German opera manager. She is the daughter of Wolfgang Wagner and Ellen Drexel.

== Life and career ==
She was born by candlelight in her grandmother Winifred's cottage in the Fichtel Mountains.

Following the death of her uncle Wieland Wagner, Wagner-Pasquier acted as her father's assistant at Bayreuth from 1967 to 1975. She discovered the tenor Peter Hofmann and played a key role in the casting and rehearsals for Patrice Chéreau's Century Ring in 1976. After that, she left the festival because her parents had become estranged as a result of the divorce.

In the period that followed, Wagner-Pasquier was an assistant to August Everding and Otto Schenk at the Vienna State Opera, and an opera director at the Royal Opera House.

Wagner-Pasquier oversaw more than 30 opera films and 120 concert productions for the Munich-based classical music company Unitel Films until 1984. She was Director of Programming at the Opéra Bastille from 1987–93. She has also worked for Houston Grand Opera, the Théâtre du Châtelet, the Teatro Real, the Festival d'Aix-en-Provence, and from 1996 has been an Artistic Consultant to The Metropolitan Opera.

On 1 September 2008, Wagner-Pasquier and her half-sister Katharina Wagner were named as joint directors of the Bayreuth Festival which is largely dedicated to the stage works of their great-grandfather Richard Wagner. The joint appointment at Bayreuth followed a long feud in which Wolfgang had favoured his second wife Gudrun and daughter Katharina as successors. The overseeing committee, the Richard Wagner Foundation of Bayreuth, had favoured Eva, and Wieland's daughter Nike had also put herself forward.

It was only after the unexpected death of Gudrun Wagner at the end of 2007 that there was a "cautious rapprochement" between Wolfgang Wagner and Eva Wagner-Pasquier. In April 2008, Wolfgang Wagner agreed to step down in favor of his two daughters - Eva and Katharina. Both then submitted a joint application to the foundation board, which the board accepted on September 1, 2008 with a majority of 22 votes (with 2 abstentions). The contract of Eva Wagner-Pasquier, one of the two artistic directors of the Bayreuth Festival, was not extended beyond 2015. She explained her voluntary resignation to the Nordbayerischer Kurier: "I have asked the shareholders to involve me as a consultant from September 2015." At the official opening in Bayreuth of the Wagner Museum at Wahnfried, Wagner-Pasquier said she felt "overwhelmed with emotion" and that the museum was “finally” worthy of him. As a consultant to the festival, she takes care of communication with the Richard Wagner Associations.

In 2021, Wagner-Pasquier narrowly survived a drowning incident after having been dragged lifeless from the River Isar.

Eva Wagner-Pasquier is married to the French film producer Yves Pasquier. They have a son Antoine Amadeus Wagner-Pasquier (b. 1982).

== Awards ==
2016 Bavarian Order of Merit

== Sources ==
- Biography on Seattle Opera site, accessed 24 September 2008
- Cohen, Roger (March 30, 2001). "Bayreuth's Director Is Told to Leave". The New York Times.
- "A Wagnerian Drama of Succession". Der Spiegel. July 20, 2007.
