= Jürg Stenzl =

Swiss musicologist

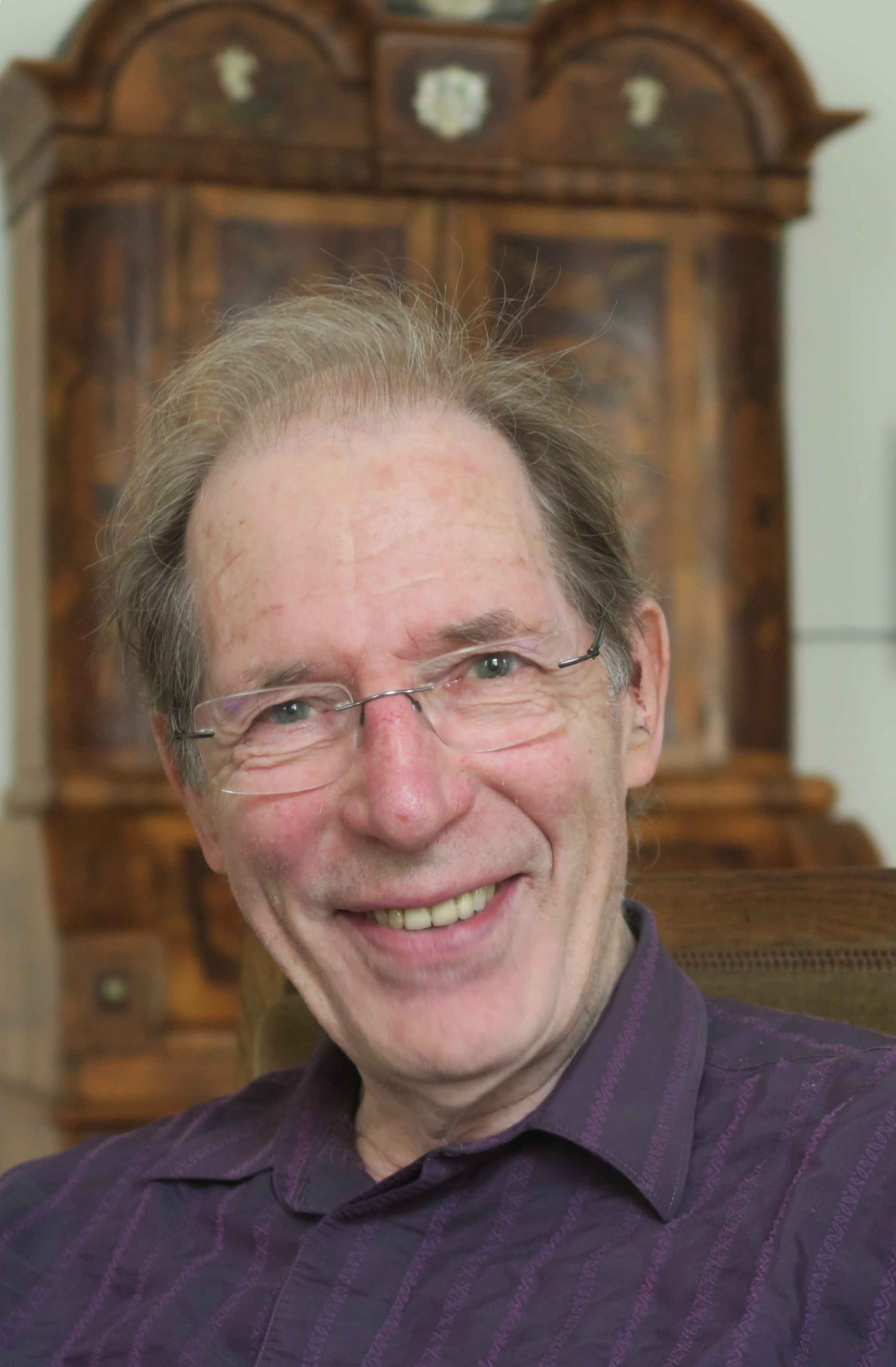
Jürg Stenzl in Vienna, October 2018

Jürg Thomas Stenzl (born 23 August 1942) is a Swiss musicologist, and university professor.

== Life ==
Born in Basel, Stenzl began his musical education in 1949, first took flute and violin lessons. From 1961 he studied oboe with Walter Huwyler and from 1963 to 1968 musicology, German literature and philosophy at the University of Bern (with Arnold Geering and Lucie Dikenmann-Balmer) as well as in 1965 at the Sorbonne, where he listened to Jacques Chailley. With his dissertation The Forty Clausulae of the Manuscript Paris, Bibliothèque nationale latin 15139 (Abbey of Saint-Victor, Paris – Clausulae), a work on 13th century music, he was awarded a doctorate in 1968 at the University of Bern. In 1970 the work appeared as a publication of the Schweizerische Musikforschende Gesellschaft.

From 1969 to his habilitation in 1974 as assistant to Luigi Ferdinando Tagliavini and from 1980 to 1991 as titular professor, he taught musicology at the University of Freiburg. Afterwards he was a representative and visiting scholar, so from 1988 to 1990 for Carl Dahlhaus at the TU Berlin, 1990 in Cremona/Italien (1990) and 1991/92 and 1996 at the University of Bern.

1992/93 Stenzl was artistic director of the Universal Edition in Vienna. In 1993 he habilitated a second time at the University of Vienna, this time on Italian music from 1922 to 1952. Stenzl was visiting professor at the University of Music and Performing Arts Graz from 1994 to 1996 and in 2003 visiting professor at Harvard University in Cambridge, Massachusetts.

In 1996 he succeeded Gerhard Croll ordinary university professor for historical musicology and head of the department of art, music and dance studies at the University of Salzburg. Together with Claudia Jeschke, he expanded the institute in 2004. The Salzburg activities ended with his retirement in 2010

He is also active as an author and music critic (Neue Zürcher Zeitung, Frankfurter Allgemeine Zeitung, Süddeutsche Zeitung, Berliner Zeitung and since 1992 for the Falter). From 1975 to 1983 he was editor of the Schweizer Musikzeitung and from 1983 to 1992 co-editor of Contrechamps and Musica/Realtà. He is considered a patron of new music, so he was congress organizer in Boswil from 1982 to 1988 and from 1985 on director of the concert series (Festival Belluard Bollwerk International (1985 to 1990) and Musiques du treizième Siècle (in the Kunsthalle of the Fri Art – Centre d'art contemporain, 1990 to 1994) in Freiburg in the Üechtland. Stenzl has been a member of the board of trustees of the Experimentalstudio des SWR in Freiburg im Breisgau since 1992, of which he is vice president. In 1994 he was programme consultant of the Donaueschinger Musiktage. From 2003 to 2005 he was chairman of the Salzburg State Cultural Advisory Board, of which he has been a member since 1998. In 2006 he conceived the counterpoint concerts at the Salzburg Easter Festival. He also worked as a production dramaturge. Stenzl is a former member of the Central Institute for Mozart Research of the International Mozarteum Foundation in Salzburg.

He has published mainly books and essays on the European history of music from medieval music to the present, including Arcangelo Corelli, Georg Friedrich Handel and Alban Berg. A special research focus is Luigi Nono: Since 1971 a Luigi Nono archive has been established, which is on loan from the Institute of Musicology at the University of Salzburg. He has written articles in the Pipers Enzyklopädie des Musiktheaters, in Grove Dictionary of Music and Musicians and in Die Musik in Geschichte und Gegenwart.

Stenzl has been married to Nike Wagner, a great-granddaughter of Richard Wagner, since 1991 and lives mainly in Vienna since his retirement.

== Awards ==
- 1986: Liszt Memorial Plaque of the Hungarian Ministry of Culture and Education in recognition of the contributions to the research of the music of Franz Liszt and Béla Bartók.

== Publications ==
Author

- Die Vierzig Clausulae der Handschrift Paris, Bibliothèque nationale latin 15139: Saint-Victor Clausulae. Dissertation. Haupt, Bern/ Stuttgart 1970.
- Von Giacomo Puccini zu Luigi Nono. Italienische Musik 1922–1952. Faschismus – Resistenza – Republik. Knuf, Buren 1990, ISBN 90-6027-639-6.
- Luigi Nono. Rowohlt, Reinbek bei Hamburg 1998, ISBN 3-499-50582-7.
- with A. T. Schaefer: Die Jahre der Oper 1996 bis 2001 – die Oper des Jahres 1998, 1999, 2000. Ed. Staatsoper Stuttgart. Kühlen, Mönchengladbach 2001, ISBN 3-87448-217-0.
- Der Klang des Song of Songs – Vertonungen des "Canticum canticorum" vom 9. bis zum Ende des 15. Jahrhunderts. Königshausen & Neumann, Würzburg 2008, ISBN 978-3-8260-3694-1.
- Jean-Luc Godard – musicien. Die Musik in den Filmen von Jean-Luc Godard, text + Kritik, Munich 2010.
- Das Virgil-Offizium Pangens chorus dulce Melos, in Irene Holzer: Die zwei Salzburger Rupertus-Offizien Eia laude condigna und Hodie posito corpora, volume 6 of the series Salzburger Stier, Königshausen & Neumann, Würzburg 2012. ISBN 3826048563
- Auf der Suche nach Geschichte(n) der musikalischen Interpretation, volume 7 of the series Salzburger Stier, Königshausen & Neumann, Würzburg 2012.
- Musik für über 1500 Stummfilme. Musique pour plus de 1500 films muets. Music for more than 1500 silent films. Das Inventar der Filmmusik im Pariser Gaumont-Palace (1911–1928) von Paul Fosse. (Filmwissenschaft. Band 18). Lit-Verlag, Münster 2017, ISBN 978-3-643-50800-3.

Editor

- Carla Henius und Luigi Nono. Briefe, Tagebücher, Notizen. Europäische Verlagsanstalt, Hamburg 1995, ISBN 3-434-50071-5.
- Orchester Kultur. Variationen über ein halbes Jahrhundert. Aus Anlass des 50. Geburtstages des SWF-Sinfonieorchesters. Metzler, Stuttgart/ Weimar 1996, ISBN 3-476-01500-9.
- Alessandro Besozzi. Sechs Trios für Oboe oder Violine, Violine und Violoncello oder Fagott, Amadeus-Verlag, Winterthur 1997
- Ernst Krenek. Oskar Kokoschka und die Geschichte von Orpheus und Eurydike. (Ernst-Krenek-Studien. Band 1). Edition Argus, Schliengen 2005, ISBN 3-931264-30-0.
- with Ernst Hintermaier und Gerhard Walterskirchen: Salzburger Musikgeschichte. Von Mittelalter bis ins 21. Jahrhundert. Pustet, Salzburg 2005, ISBN 3-7025-0511-3.
- with Lars E. Laubhold: Herbert von Karajan 1908–1989. Der Dirigent im Lichte einer Geschichte der musikalischen Interpretation. Pustet, Salzburg 2008, ISBN 978-3-7025-0583-7.

== Literature ==
- Darbellay, Etienne (2001). "Stenzl, Jürg (Thomas)". Grove Music Online (8th ed.). Oxford University Press. doi:10.1093/gmo/9781561592630.article.26685. ISBN 978-1-56159-263-0.
- Christian Fastl: Stenzl, Jürg. In Oesterreichisches Musiklexikon. Online-edition, Vienna 2002 ff., ISBN 3-7001-3077-5; Print edition: Volume 5, publishing house of the Austrian Academy of Sciences, Vienna 2006, ISBN 3-7001-3067-8.
- Ulrich Mosch (ed.): Annäherungen. Festschrift für Jürg Stenzl zum 65. Geburtstag. Pfau, Saarbrücken 2007, ISBN 978-3-89727-379-5.
- Stenzl, Jürg. In Ludwig Finscher (ed.): Die Musik in Geschichte und Gegenwart. Second edition, Personal part, volume 15 (Schoof – Stranz). Bärenreiter/Metzler, Kassel among others 2006, ISBN 3-7618-1135-7 (Online edition, subscription required for full access)
