= Bayreuth Festival =

German music festival of Wagner's stage works

Coordinates: 49°57′36″N 11°34′47″E

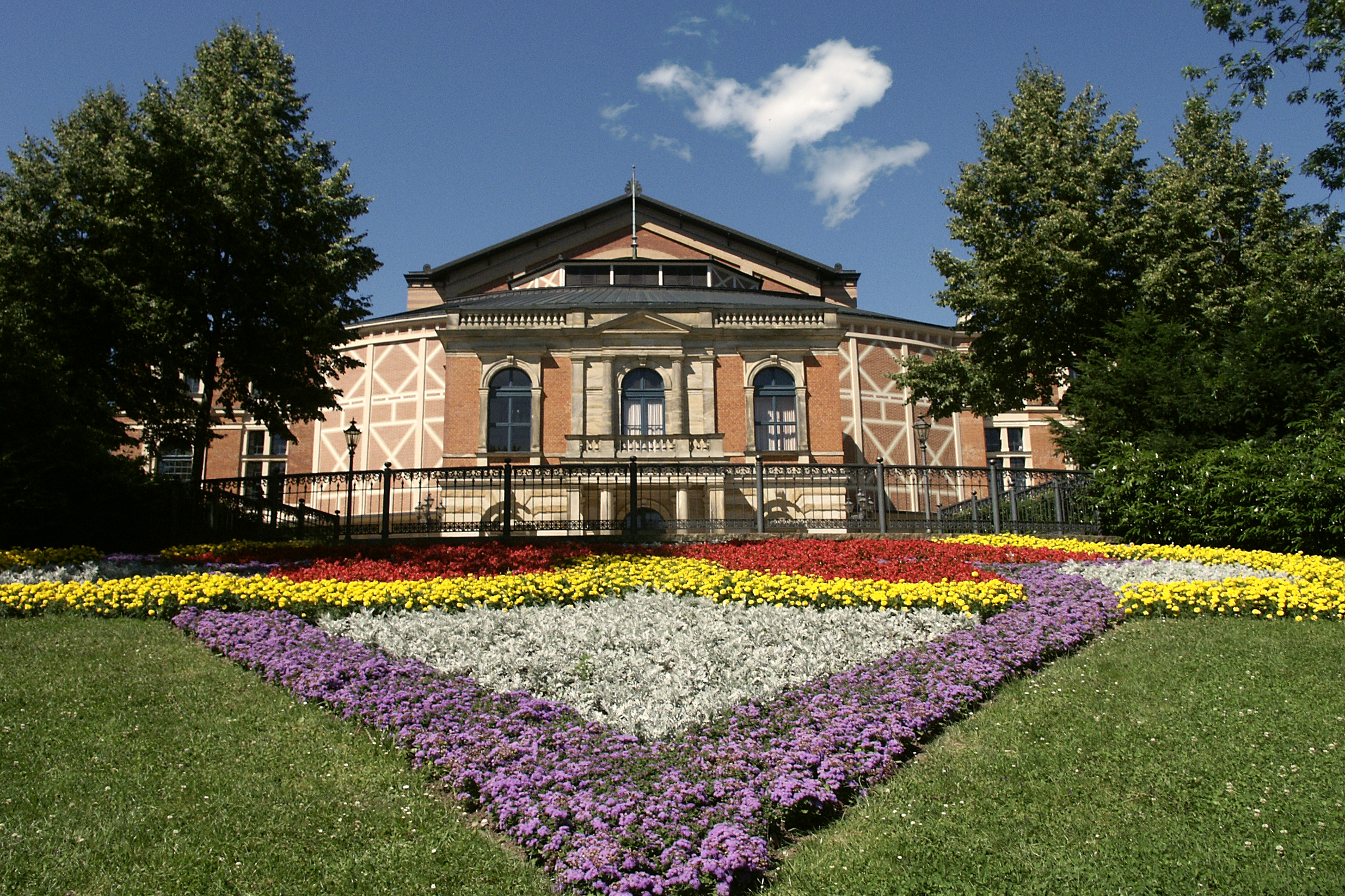
- Festspielhaus in Bayreuth, the festival's main venue, in 2006
- Genre: Canon of Wagner's stage works
- Frequency: Annual
- Locations: Bayreuth, Bavaria, Germany
- Inaugurated: 1876; 150 years ago
- Website: Official website

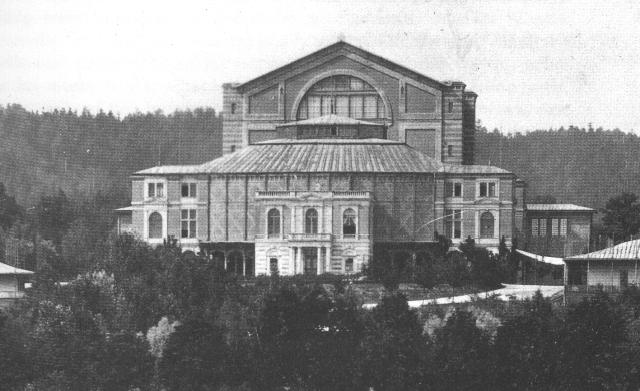
Bayreuth Festspielhaus in 1882

The Bayreuth Festival (German: Bayreuther Festspiele) is a music festival held annually in Bayreuth, Germany, at which performances of stage works by the 19th-century German composer Richard Wagner are presented. Wagner himself conceived and promoted the idea of a special festival to showcase his own works, in particular his monumental cycle Der Ring des Nibelungen and Parsifal.

Performances take place in a specially designed theatre, the Bayreuth Festspielhaus. Wagner personally supervised the design and construction of the theatre, which contained many architectural innovations to accommodate the huge orchestras for which Wagner wrote, as well as the composer's particular vision about the staging of his works. The Festival has become a pilgrimage destination for Wagnerians and classical-music enthusiasts.

== Origins ==
The origins of the Festival itself lie rooted in Richard Wagner's interest in establishing his financial independence. A souring of the relationship with his patron, Ludwig II of Bavaria, led to his expulsion from Munich, where he had originally intended to launch the festival. Wagner next considered Nuremberg, which would have reinforced the thematic significance of works such as Die Meistersinger von Nürnberg. On the advice of Hans Richter, however, the focus fell upon Bayreuth which enjoyed three distinct advantages.

First, the town boasted a splendid venue: the Markgräfliches Opernhaus built for Margrave Frederick and his wife, Friederike Sophie Wilhelmine (sister of Frederick the Great) in 1747. With its ample capacity and strong acoustics, the opera house seemed a good match for Wagner's vision. Second, the town of Bayreuth was located outside those regions where Wagner no longer owned the rights to the performance of his own works, which he had sold off in 1864 in order to alleviate pressing financial concerns. Finally, the town had no cultural life that could offer competition to Wagner's own artistic dominance. The Festival, once launched, would be the dominant feature of Bayreuth's cultural landscape. In addition, "Richard Wagner did not want his works interpreted amid the hustle and noise or the distractions of a large city; he sought a place remote from the usual theatrical world where it was so quiet so that the hearers could concentrate their whole attention on the work offered, and could in the pauses refresh themselves in natural surroundings."

In April 1870, Wagner and his wife Cosima visited Bayreuth. On inspection, the opera house proved to be inadequate. It was built to accommodate the baroque orchestras of the 18th century and was therefore unsuited for the complex stagings and large orchestras that Wagner's later stage works required. Nonetheless, the burgermeisters proved open to assisting Wagner with the construction of an entirely new theatre, and the Festival was planned to launch in 1873. After a fruitless meeting in the spring of 1871 with the German Chancellor Otto von Bismarck to obtain funds, Wagner embarked on a fundraising tour across Germany, including Leipzig and Frankfurt.

An initial public subscription proved disappointing until Wagner, at the suggestion of his friend and admirer Emil Heckel, launched a number of Wagner Societies to increase participation in the Festival's subscription. Societies were established in Leipzig, Berlin, Vienna and other places.

Despite making direct appeals based on Wagner's role as a composer of the new German Reich, the Societies and other fundraising channels were well short of the needed sum by the end of 1872. Wagner made another appeal to Bismarck in August 1873, and was again denied.

Desperate, Wagner turned to his former patron, Ludwig II, who reluctantly agreed to help. In January 1874, Ludwig granted 100,000 Thaler and construction on the theatre, designed by architect Gottfried Semper, started shortly thereafter. Semper, inspired by the classical amphitheater, built a double proscenium in the theatre, creating a necessary space between the listener's "real world" and the imaginary world that occurred on stage. Later in the construction of the theatre, architect Carl Brandt expanded Semper's double proscenium to six pairs of proscenia, and also created its amphitheater shape. Performances featured a sunken pit and dimmed lighting; it is clear that Wagner was adamant about controlling the audience's visual and aural experience during his performances. These specific considerations resulted in a delayed opening of the theatre. A planned 1875 debut was postponed for a year due to construction and other delays.

== Early history ==
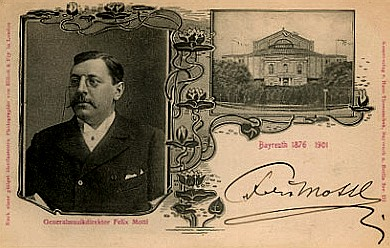
Felix Mottl conducted Tristan und Isolde at Bayreuth in 1886.

Since its opening in 1876, the Bayreuth Festival has been a socio-cultural phenomenon. The inauguration took place on 13 August 1876, with a performance of Beethoven's "Choral" Symphony, which is occasionally programmed during the festival. (It was played at the post-war reopening in 1951, and subsequently in 1953, 1954, 1963, 2001, and had been planned for the cancelled 2020 season.) Then came the first performance of Das Rheingold. Present at this unique musical event were Kaiser Wilhelm, Dom Pedro II of Brazil, King Ludwig (who attended in secret, probably to avoid the Kaiser), and other members of the nobility, as well as the philosopher Friedrich Nietzsche who committed much effort to helping his then good friend Wagner establish the festival, and such accomplished composers as Anton Bruckner, Edvard Grieg, Pyotr Tchaikovsky, Franz Liszt, and the young Arthur Foote.

Artistically, the festival was a success. ("Something has taken place at Bayreuth which our grandchildren and their children will still remember", wrote Tchaikovsky, attending the Festival as a Russian correspondent.) Financially, however, the festival was a disaster and did not begin to make money until several years later. Wagner abandoned his original plan to hold a second festival the following year, and travelled to London to conduct a series of concerts in an attempt to make up the deficit. Although the festival was plagued by financial problems in its early years, it survived through state intervention and the continued support of influential Wagnerians, including King Ludwig II of Bavaria.

Following the financial failure of the initial Bayreuth Festival, as well as Wagner's death in 1883, there was a political discourse of Wagner's works involving a disenchantment with the Reich that led to a cultural lull of the festival. The declining popularity of the current centralized government created an artistic shift away from Richard Wagner who had preemptively popularized his works amongst the German government in an attempt to gain mass popularity and recognition. This consequently led to a general lack of public interest in the festival in its early history.

From its inception, the festival has attracted leading conductors and singers, many of whom performed without pay. Among these was Hans Richter, who conducted the premiere of the Ring Cycle in 1876. Another was the talented conductor Hermann Levi, who was personally chosen by Richard Wagner to conduct the debut of Parsifal in 1882 with the assistance of the young Engelbert Humperdinck.

Following Wagner's death, his widow Cosima continued running the festival at one or, more frequently, two-year intervals. She gradually introduced the early operas which complete the Bayreuth canon of Wagner's last ten mature works. Levi, the son of a rabbi, remained the festival's principal conductor for the next two decades. Felix Mottl, who was involved with the festival from 1876 to 1901, conducted Tristan und Isolde there in 1886. Until the 1920s, performances were strictly in accordance with the traditions established under King Ludwig's patronage. Not a note was "cut" from any of the enormous scores; no concessions were made to the limits of human patience on the part of the audiences. Cosima Wagner preserved the productions of Parsifal and the Ring just as they had been in Wagner's day, defending any proposed changes with appeals to her son Siegfried: "Was this not how Papa did it in 1876?" During her era of leadership, the festival became increasingly associated with antisemitism.

After Cosima's retirement in 1906, Siegfried Wagner took over management of the festival, introducing new staging and performance styles. His early death in 1930 left the Festival in the hands of his English-born wife Winifred Wagner, with Heinz Tietjen as artistic director.

== Bayreuth under Nazi Germany ==
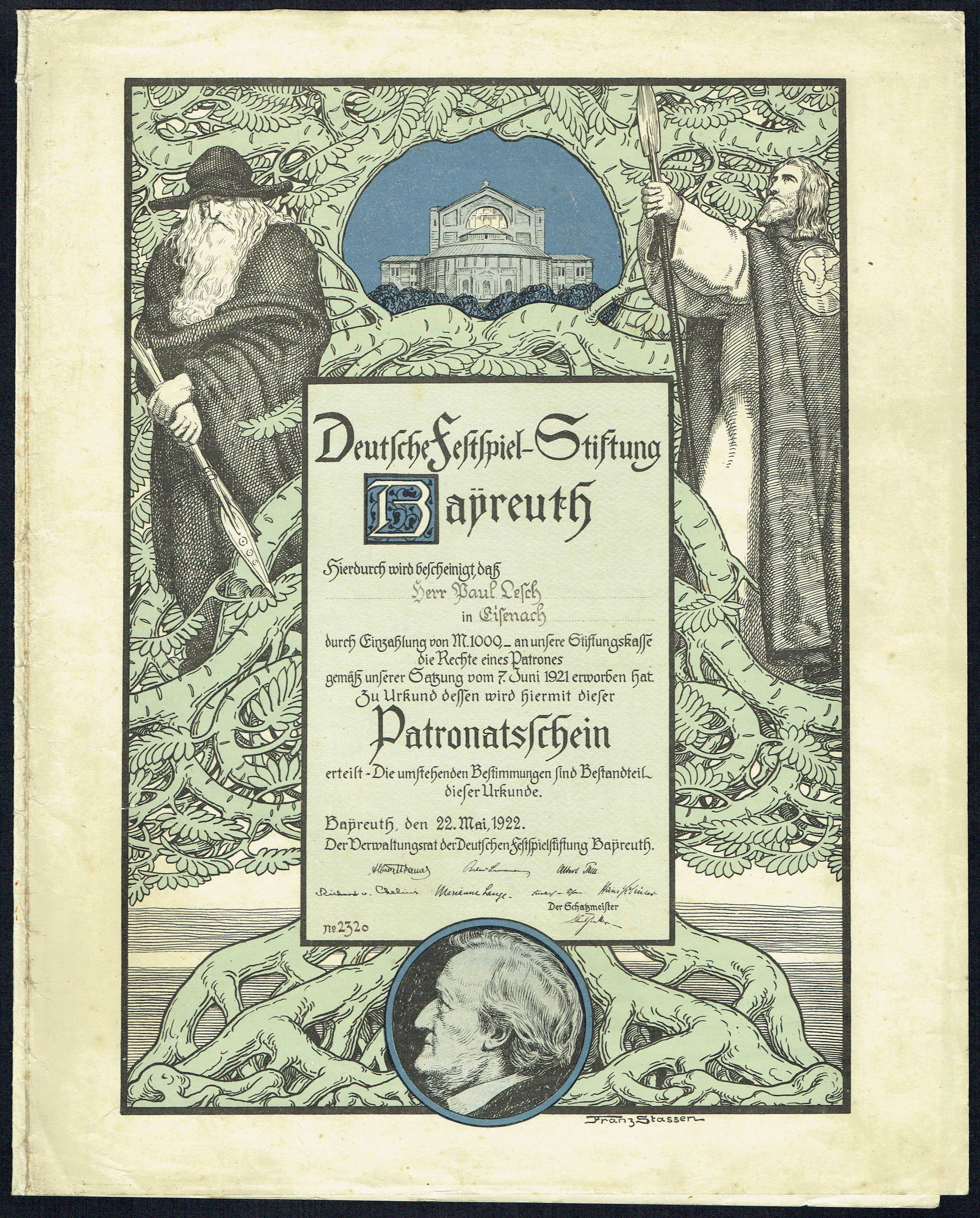
Patronage certificate for funding the Bayreuth festival, issued 22 May 1922

In the 1920s, well before the rise of the Nazi Party, Winifred Wagner became a strong supporter and close personal friend of Adolf Hitler; her correspondence with Hitler has never been released by the Wagner family. She and other festival leaders were members of Nazi chief ideologue Alfred Rosenberg's Kampfbund für deutsche Kultur, which actively suppressed modernist music and works by "degenerate" artists. The festival maintained some artistic independence under Nazi rule. Ironically, Hitler attended performances that included Jewish and foreign singers, long after they had been banned from all other venues across Germany (including homosexual heldentenor Max Lorenz, married to a well-known Jewish woman). Winifred's influence with Hitler was so strong that at her behest, he wrote a letter to anti-fascist Italian conductor Arturo Toscanini, inviting him to lead the festival. Toscanini, who had conducted there in 1930 and 1931, refused in 1933. From 1933 to 1942, the festival was conducted principally by Karl Elmendorff.

It was in Nazi Germany that the festival made its first break from tradition, abandoning the deteriorating 19th century sets created by Richard Wagner. Many protested at the changes, including prominent conductors such as Toscanini and Richard Strauss, and even some members of the Wagner family. In their view, any change to the festival was a profanation against "the Master" (Wagner). Nevertheless, Hitler approved of the changes, thus paving the way for more innovations in the decades to come.

During the war, the festival was turned over to the Nazi Party, which continued to sponsor performances for wounded soldiers returning from the front. These soldiers were forced to attend lectures on Wagner before the performances, and most found the festival to be tedious. However, as "guests of the Führer", none complained.

=== Bayreuth Memorial ===
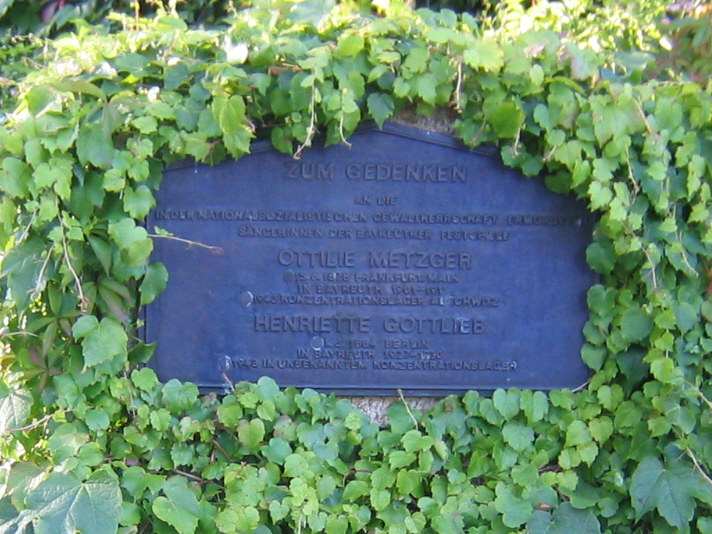
Memorial to Jewish singers in the Bayreuth Festival Park

During the 1970s, Winifred Wagner was repeatedly petitioned to install a memorial to the Jewish singers at the Bayreuth Festival who had been murdered in concentration camps. A plaque was finally installed honouring Ottilie Metzger-Lattermann and Henriette Gottlieb after Winifred's death.

== New festival ==
Two-thirds of the town of Bayreuth were destroyed by American bombing in the final days of World War II, taking with it the rotunda, living room and guest room of Wahnfried, though the theatre itself was undamaged. Following the war, Winifred Wagner was sentenced to probation by a war court for her support of the Nazi Party. The court also banned her from administration of the Bayreuth Festival and its assets, which fell eventually to her two sons, Wolfgang and Wieland.

During American occupation of the region after World War II, the theatre was used for army recreation and religious services for American soldiers. Only popular concerts and mixed entertainment were allowed: comedy, dancing, acrobatics, and then only Die Fledermaus was staged. When the Festival House was handed over to the city of Bayreuth in 1946, it was used for concerts of the Bayreuth Symphony Orchestra and the performances of such operas as Beethoven's Fidelio, d'Albert's Tiefland, Puccini's Madama Butterfly, and Verdi's La traviata and talks about reopening of the Wagnerian Festival started. Finally, it reopened on 29 July 1951 with, as always, a performance by the Bayreuth Festival Orchestra under conductor Wilhelm Furtwängler of Beethoven's 9th Symphony, followed by the first post-war performance of Wagner's Parsifal.

Under the direction of Wieland Wagner, the "New Bayreuth" ushered in an era that was no less than revolutionary. Gone were the elaborate naturalistic sets, replaced with minimalist modern productions. In comparison, the pre-war changes seemed tame. For the first time in its history, the Bayreuth audience booed at the end of productions. Wieland was particularly derided for his 1956 production of Die Meistersinger von Nürnberg. Stripped of its pageantry, conservatives viewed the breaking of this "sacred German tradition" as an outrage.

Wieland defended the changes as an attempt to create an "invisible stage" that would allow the audience to experience the full psychosocial aspects of the drama without the baggage and distraction of elaborate set designs. Others have speculated that by stripping Wagner's works of their Germanic and historic elements, Wieland was attempting to distance Bayreuth from its nationalistic past and create productions with universal appeal. Over time, many critics came to appreciate the unique beauty of Wieland's reinterpretation of his grandfather's works.

Wieland's innovative productions invited comparison to Wolfgang's, which critics unanimously found to be uninspired. If Wieland's productions were radical, Wolfgang's were regressive. Although still minimalist in approach, Wolfgang resurrected much of the naturalistic and romantic elements of pre-war productions. Thus, when Wieland died prematurely from lung cancer in 1966, many wondered if Bayreuth had a future. They began to question Bayreuth's primacy among German opera houses, and some suggested that more interesting productions were being staged elsewhere.

Around this time (1955), in order to broaden its audience, the whole Bayreuth Festival company conducted performances in Paris and Barcelona, performing Parsifal, Die Walküre and Tristan und Isolde.

In 1973, faced with overwhelming criticism and family infighting, the Bayreuth Festival and its assets were transferred to a newly created Richard Wagner Foundation. The board of directors included members of the Wagner family and others appointed by the state. As chairman, Wolfgang Wagner remained in charge of administration of the festival.

== The Wagner Werkstatt ==
While Wolfgang Wagner continued to administer the festival, beginning in the 1970s, production was handled by a number of new directors in what Wolfgang called Werkstatt Bayreuth (Bayreuth Workshop). The idea was to turn the festival into an opportunity for directors to experiment with new methods for presenting the stage works. The change came out of necessity, as it was impossible for Wolfgang to both administer and direct the festival. It also provided an opportunity for Bayreuth to renew itself with each production, rather than continue to present the same stage works in the same way, year after year. Ingmar Bergman, who famously made a film version in Swedish of Mozart's Die Zauberflöte, turned down an invitation to direct the festival.

The most sensational production in Werkstatt Bayreuth was the centennial Ring cycle (Jahrhundertring) directed by Patrice Chéreau, who used an updated 19th-century setting, following the interpretation of George Bernard Shaw who regarded the Ring as a social commentary on the exploitation of the working class by wealthy 19th-century capitalists. The audience reaction was initially split between those who saw the production as an offence and those who considered it the best Ring Cycle ever produced. The ensuing conflict, short only of outright riot, between supporters and detractors was unprecedented in the history of the festival. Later, the performances proved influential for the concept of Regietheater.

Other notable directors to have participated in Werkstatt Bayreuth included Jean-Pierre Ponnelle, Sir Peter Hall of the Royal Shakespeare Company, Götz Friedrich of the Deutsche Oper Berlin, Harry Kupfer of the Berlin State Opera in the former communist East Germany and Heiner Müller of the Berliner Ensemble. In the end, Wolfgang's decision to bring in experimental directors helped rejuvenate Bayreuth and restore its reputation as the world leader in Wagnerian opera.

== 21st century ==
There was uncertainty over how the Festival was to be managed after the retirement of Wolfgang Wagner at the end of August 2008. In 2001, the Festival's 21-member board of directors had voted for his daughter, Eva Wagner-Pasquier, to succeed him. Wolfgang Wagner, however, proposed to hand control over to his second wife, Gudrun, and their daughter Katharina. Gudrun died in 2007. No successor was named at that time, but it was speculated that Wagner-Pasquier and Katharina would eventually be named as joint directors of the festival. Directors have stated that preference will be given to descendants of Richard Wagner, and that a non-descendant would have to be a clearly better candidate.

On 1 September 2008, Wolfgang Wagner's daughters, Eva Wagner-Pasquier and Katharina Wagner, were named by Bavaria's culture minister, Thomas Goppel, to take over the Festival. They were to take up their duties immediately, since their father had announced his retirement at the conclusion of the 2008 Festival. They were chosen ahead of the pair of their cousin, Nike Wagner, and Gerard Mortier, who had placed a late bid for the directorship on 24 August. The conductor Christian Thielemann has agreed to act as chief adviser to the new directors, effectively taking the role of music director of the Festival.

In 2014 it was announced that Eva would be stepping down from the co-directorship leaving, in accord with her father's will, Katharina in sole charge.

On 31 March 2020 it was announced that, due to the COVID-19 pandemic and the resulting restrictions, the 2020 festival (due to take place from 25 July to 30 August) would be cancelled. The new Der Ring des Nibelungen production planned for that festival would be postponed until at least 2022.

Restrictions were eased for the 2021 festival, which went ahead with a limited audience capacity and testing/vaccination requirements. The 2022 festival went ahead as normal, including the new production of the Ring.

In 2023 the festival had mixed opinions due to the use of AR goggles and 3D glasses to enhance the experience. The festival has attempted to modernize to aid with low ticket sales.

=== Tickets ===
The festival draws thousands of Wagner fans to Bayreuth every summer. It is very difficult to get tickets, because demand (estimated at 500,000) greatly exceeds supply (58,000 tickets); the waiting time is between five and ten years (or more). The process entails submitting an order form every summer; applicants are usually successful after about ten years. Failure to make an application every year results in being placed at the back of the queue. Although some tickets are allocated by lottery, preference is given to members of the Society of Friends of Bayreuth (financial donors), famous patrons, and to regional and international Wagner societies, which are distributed to their own members through lottery or the willingness to pay a high contribution.

However, in 2013 tickets for one opera production were offered exclusively online, on a first come first served basis with no preferential eligibility. It is reported that they sold out within seconds. This offer was repeated for the 2014 season, with tickets being available for eight performances including one complete Ring cycle. As of 2014, retail ticket prices ranged from €320 for a front row stalls seat to €45 for a gallery (third level) back row seat.

The Festival authorities assiduously police the traffic of tickets, and monitor sites such as eBay. On admission patrons may be required to show photographic identification matching the name on the ticket, with any not matching being refused admission to the performance.

In 2011 it was revealed that the German Bundesrechnungshof (federal audit office) were investigating the situation where, for a publicly subsidised event, only 40 percent of the tickets were actually available to the general public. Early in 2012 it was announced that changes would be made to the allocation system, including the ending of allocations to Wagner Societies (but not including the Society of Friends of Bayreuth as they make a substantial financial contribution) and a reduction in the proportion reserved for travel agents and hotels. As a result, the proportion of tickets available to the general public would increase to about 65 percent of the total available.

=== Der Ring des Nibelungen ===
A new production of Der Ring des Nibelungen, or the Ring cycle, is presented every five to seven years, following a year in which no Ring is presented. In years in which the Ring is staged, three other works are also presented. When no Ring is staged, five other works are presented. Tickets for the Ring are normally sold only as a complete set for all four performances.

The Ring produced for the Festival's centenary in 1976 was produced by a French team around director Patrice Chéreau and conductor Pierre Boulez. Known as the Jahrhundertring, it was filmed.

The newest production of the Ring (directed by Valentin Schwarz) premiered in 2022 after pandemic-related delays. Schwarz's modern staging of the cycle— depicting a complex, tangled family drama spanning generations—was met with mixed reviews from audiences and the press.

== Directors ==
- Richard Wagner (1876–1883)
- Cosima Liszt Wagner (1883–1908)
- Siegfried Wagner (1908–1930)
- Winifred Williams Wagner (1930–1945)
- Wieland Wagner and Wolfgang Wagner (1951–1966)
- Wolfgang Wagner (1967–2008)
- Eva Wagner-Pasquier and Katharina Wagner (2008–2015)
- Katharina Wagner (2015–present)

== Recordings ==
=== DVD ===
- Tannhäuser (1978) Director: Götz Friedrich, Conductor: Sir Colin Davis, Soloists: Spas Wenkoff, Dame Gwyneth Jones, Bernd Weikl, Hans Sotin, Label: Deutsche Grammophon/Unitel.
- Der Ring des Nibelungen (1980) Complete Cycle Director: Patrice Chéreau, Conductor: Pierre Boulez, Soloists: Dame Gwyneth Jones, Donald McIntyre, Peter Hofmann, Jeannine Altmeyer, Matti Salminen, Label: Deutsche Grammophon/Unitel
- Parsifal (1981) Director: Wolfgang Wagner, Conductor: Horst Stein, Soloists: Siegfried Jerusalem, Eva Randová, Bernd Weikl, Hans Sotin, Matti Salminen, Label: Deutsche Grammophon/Unitel
- Tristan und Isolde (1983) Director, stage design & costumes: Jean-Pierre Ponnelle, Conductor: Daniel Barenboim, Soloists: René Kollo, Johanna Meier, Matti Salminen, Hanna Schwarz, Hermann Becht, Label: Deutsche Grammophon/Unitel
- Die Meistersinger von Nürnberg (1984) Centenary Production: Director: Wolfgang Wagner, Conductor: Horst Stein, Soloists: Bernd Weikl, Siegfried Jerusalem, Mari Anne Häggander, Hermann Prey, Label: Deutsche Grammophon/Unitel
- Der fliegende Holländer (1985) Director: Harry Kupfer, Conductor: Woldemar Nelsson, Soloists: Simon Estes, Lisbeth Balslev, Matti Salminen, Label: Deutsche Grammophon/Unitel
- Lohengrin (1990) Director: Werner Herzog, Conductor: Peter Schneider, Soloists: Paul Frey, Cheryl Studer, Manfred Schenk, Label: Deutsche Grammophon/Unitel
- Der Ring des Nibelungen (1992) Director: Harry Kupfer, Conductor: Daniel Barenboim, Soloists: John Tomlinson, Anne Evans, Nadine Secunde, Siegfried Jerusalem, Label: Warner Classics
- Tristan und Isolde (1995) Director: Heiner Müller, Stage design: Erich Wonder, Costumes: Yohji Yamamoto, Conductor: Daniel Barenboim, Soloists: Siegfried Jerusalem, Waltraud Meier, Falk Struckmann, Label: Deutsche Grammophon/Unitel
- Götterdämmerung (1997) Director: Alfred Kirchner, Stage design: rosalie, Conductor: James Levine, Soloists: Wolfgang Schmidt, Deborah Polaski, Hanna Schwarz, Eric Halfvarson, Ekkehard Wlaschiha, Falk Struckmann, Anne Schwanewilms, Label: Deutsche Grammophon/Unitel
- Die Meistersinger von Nürnberg (2008) Director: Katharina Wagner, Conductor: Sebastian Weigle, Soloists: Michaela Kaune, Klaus Florian Vogt, Franz Hawlata, Michael Volle, Label: BF Medien/United Motion

=== Laserdisc ===
- Tristan und Isolde (1983) Conductor: Daniel Barenboim, Orchester der Bayreuther Festspiele, Staged and Directed by: Jean-Pierre Ponnelle, Soloists: René Kollo, Johanna Meier, Matti Salminen, Hermann Becht, Hanna Schwarz, Unitel, Laserdisc Philips 070–509–1

=== VHS ===
- Die Meistersinger von Nürnberg (1984) Conductor: Horst Stein, Orchester der Bayreuther Festspiele, Staged by: Wolfgang Wagner Video Director: Brian Large, Soloists: Bernd Weikl, Siegfried Jerusalem, Hermann Prey, Mari Anne Häggander, Graham Clark, Unitel
- Parsifal (1999) Conductor: Giuseppe Sinopoli, Chor und Orchester der Bayreuther Festspiele, Staged by: Wolfgang Wagner, Soloists: Poul Elming, Linda Watson, Hans Sotin, Falk Struckmann, Ekkehard Wlaschiha, Unitel

=== CD ===
==== Historical recordings ====
Historical performances of Wagner's operas at Bayreuth, available on CD, are too numerous to list. The following are a few outstanding examples.

- 100 Jahre Bayreuth auf Schallplatte: The Early Festival Singers, 1887–1906, Gebhardt Records

This 12 CD set put together all of the surviving recordings done by the Gramophone and Typewriter Company in 1904 at Bayreuth and includes some of the original artists from the 1876 debut. Listen

- Tristan und Isolde (1928) Conductor: Karl Elmendorff, Soloists: Nanny Larsén-Todsen (as Isolde), Anny Helm (Brangäne), Gunnar Graarud (Tristan), Rudolf Bockelmann (Kurwenal], Ivar Andrésen (König Marke), Joachim Sattler (Melot), Gustav Rodin (Ein junger Seemann), Hans Beer (Ein Hirt)

– recorded during the summer of 1928 with the approval of Siegfried Wagner, in the Festspielhaus without an audience, by Columbia EMI onto 40 78rpm sides (for 20 discs)
– several reissues on CD: Grammofono, 2000 AB 78925-26 (2 CDs – "First Bayreuth Recordings Vol. 2") | Naxos, CD 8.110200-02 (3 CDs) | Preiser, PSR 90383 (2 CDs)

- Götterdämmerung (1942) Conductor: Karl Elmendorff, Soloists: Marta Fuchs (Brünnhilde), Camilla Kallab (1. Norne, Waltraute), Else Fischer (Gutrune). Set Svanholm (Siegfried), Friedrich Dalberg (Hagen), Robert Burg (Alberich), Egmont Koch (Gunther)

– from a radio broadcast of Deutscher Rundfunk; this is what German soldiers would have heard as "Guests of the Führer"
– issued by various labels: among them Music and Arts, CD-1058 (4 CDs) | Preiser, PRE 90164 (4 CDs)

- Die Meistersinger von Nürnberg (1943) Conductor Wilhelm Furtwängler, Soloists: Maria Müller (Eva), Camilla Kallab (Magdalene), Max Lorenz (Walther), Jaro Prohaska (Hans Sachs), Josef Greindl (Veit Pogner), Eugen Fuchs ( Beckmesser)

– issued by various labels: among them Grammofono 2000, AB 78602/05 (4 CDs)

==== Postwar performances ====
- Ludwig van Beethoven – Symphony No. 9 Choral (1951): Conductor: Wilhelm Furtwängler. Soloists: Elisabeth Schwarzkopf, Elisabeth Höngen, Hans Hopf, Otto Edelmann, (EMI, mono)
- Die Meistersinger von Nürnberg (1951): Conductor: Herbert von Karajan. Soloists: Elisabeth Schwarzkopf, Otto Edelmann, Erich Kunz, Hans Hopf, Gerhard Unger. Recorded live. (EMI, mono)
- Götterdämmerung (1951) Conductor: Hans Knappertsbusch, (Testament Records, mono)
- Parsifal (1951): Conductor: Hans Knappertsbusch. Soloists: Wolfgang Windgassen, Ludwig Weber, George London, Martha Mödl, Hermann Uhde, Arnold van Mill. Recorded live. (Teldec, mono)
- Tristan und Isolde (1952): Conductor: Herbert von Karajan. Soloists: Ramón Vinay, Martha Mödl, Ira Malaniuk, Ludwig Weber, Hans Hotter, Hermann Uhde. Recorded live on 23 July. (Orfeo, mono)
- Der Ring des Nibelungen (1953): Conductor: Clemens Krauss. Soloists: Ramón Vinay, Wolfgang Windgassen, Regina Resnik, Astrid Varnay, Hans Hotter, Hermann Uhde, Gustav Neidlinger, Ludwig Weber, Josef Greindl, Gerhard Stolze, Ira Malaniuk, Maria von Ilosvay, Paul Kuën, Rita Streich. Recorded live. (Archipel Records, mono)
- Lohengrin (1953) Conductor: Joseph Keilberth, (Decca Records LW 50006, mono)
- Der Ring des Nibelungen (1955): Conductor: Joseph Keilberth. Recorded live. (Testament, stereo)
- Der Ring des Nibelungen (1956): Conductor: Hans Knappertsbusch. Soloists: Wolfgang Windgassen, Ludwig Suthaus, Astrid Varnay, Gré Brouwenstijn, Georgine von Milinkovič, Jean Madeira, Hans Hotter, Gustav Neidlinger, Josef Greindl, Maria von Ilosvay. Recorded Live. (Orfeo, mono)
- Parsifal (1962): Conductor: Hans Knappertsbusch. Soloists: Jess Thomas, Hans Hotter, George London, Irene Dalis, Gustav Neidlinger, Martti Talvela, (Philips, stereo)
- Tristan und Isolde (1966): Conductor: Karl Böhm. Soloists: Birgit Nilsson, Wolfgang Windgassen, Christa Ludwig, Martti Talvela, Eberhard Waechter, (Deutsche Grammophon, stereo)
- Der Ring des Nibelungen (1966–67): Conductor: Karl Böhm. Soloists: Helga Dernesch, Birgit Nilsson, Theo Adam, James King, Leonie Rysanek, Wolfgang Windgassen, (Philips, stereo)
- Die Meistersinger von Nürnberg (1968): Conductor: Karl Böhm. Soloists: Theo Adam, Karl Ridderbusch, Waldemar Kmentt, Dame Gwyneth Jones, (Orfeo, stereo)
- Parsifal (1970): Conductor: Pierre Boulez. Soloists: James King, Franz Crass, Thomas Stewart, Sir Donald McIntyre and Dame Gwyneth Jones, (Deutsche Grammophon, stereo)
- Der Ring des Nibelungen (1980): Conductor: Pierre Boulez. Soloists: Dame Gwyneth Jones, Sir Donald McIntyre, Manfred Jung, Peter Hofmann, Jeannine Altmeyer, (Philips, stereo)
- Der Ring des Nibelungen (1991): Conductor: Daniel Barenboim, (Warner Classics, stereo)
- Der Ring des Nibelungen (2008): Conductor: Christian Thielemann, (Opus Arte, stereo)

== See also ==
- Bayreuther Blätter
