= Nike Wagner =

German opera director

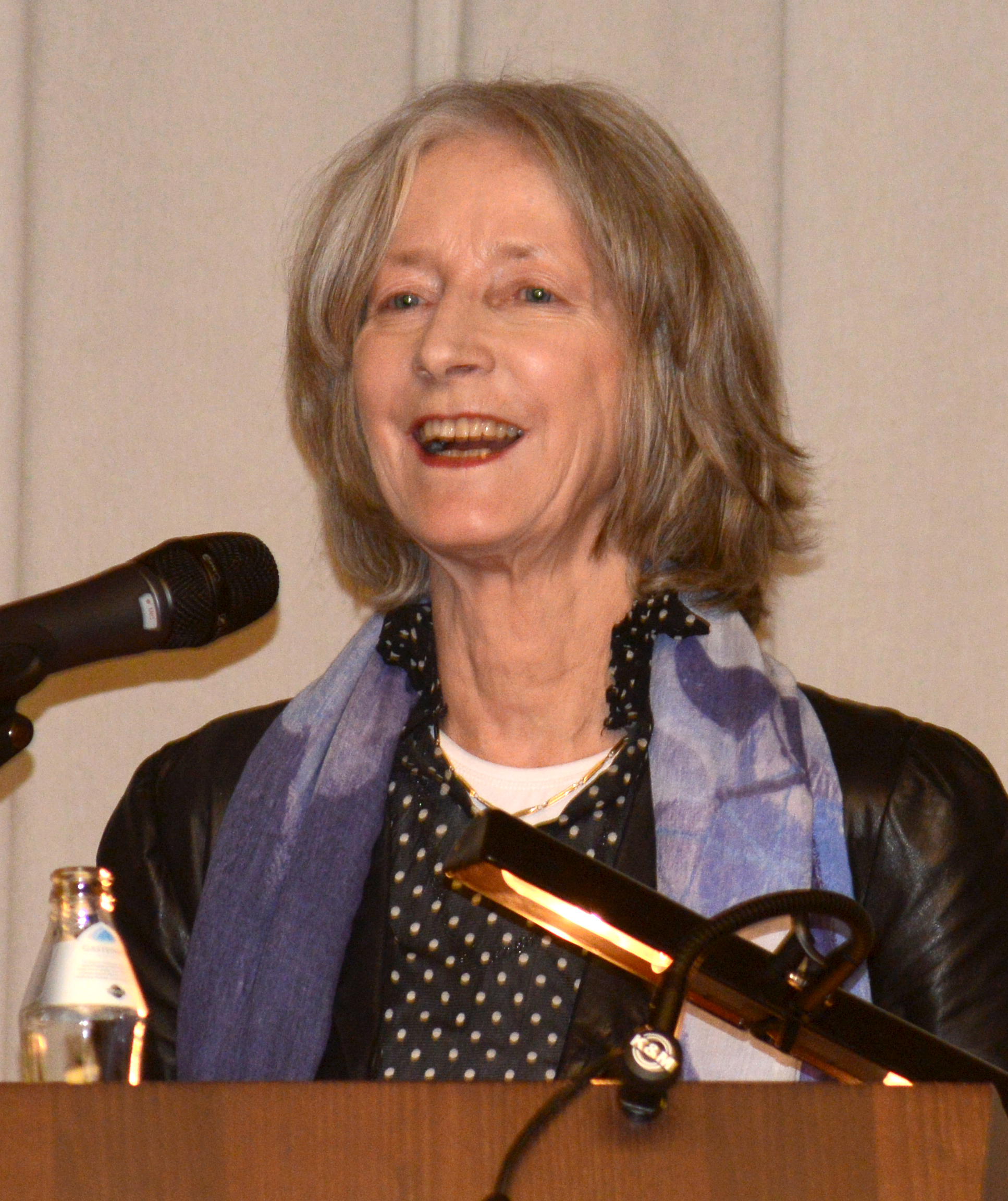
- Wagner in 2014
- Born: 9 June 1945 (age 81); Überlingen, Germany
- Education: Northwestern University
- Occupations: Author; Festival director
- Organizations: Kunstfest Weimar; Beethovenfest
- Spouse: Jürg Stenzl (m. 1991)
- Father: Wieland Wagner
- Relatives: Siegfried Wagner (grandfather); Winifred Wagner (grandmother); Wolfgang Wagner (uncle); Friedelind Wagner (aunt); Verena Wagner (aunt)
- Awards: Order of Merit of the Free State of Thuringia

Nike Wagner (German pronunciation: [ˈniːkə ˈvaːɡnɐ]) (born 9 June 1945) is a German dramaturge, arts administrator and author. She directed the festival Kunstfest Weimar, and has been the director of the Beethovenfest from 2014. The daughter of Wieland Wagner, she is a great-granddaughter of Richard Wagner, and a great-great‑granddaughter of Franz Liszt. She devoted books to the Wagner family and its cultural and political influence.

== Career ==
Wagner was born in Überlingen on Lake Constance in Germany, the daughter of Wieland Wagner and the choreographer Gertrud Reissinger. Her paternal great-grandfather was Richard Wagner, and she is also the great-great‑granddaughter of Franz Liszt.

She grew up in Wahnfried, Bayreuth, until her father's death in 1966, whereupon her uncle Wolfgang Wagner had the house measured and asked her widowed mother to pay rent. She studied musicology, literature and theatre in Berlin, and holds a Ph.D. from Northwestern University in Evanston, Illinois, obtained in 1980 under the direction of Erich Heller.

She is the author of several important books on a variety of subjects, which include Karl Kraus (Geist und Geschlecht: Karl Kraus und die Erotik der Wiener Moderne, Frankfurt am Main, Suhrkamp, 1982 — a work based on her doctoral dissertation) and the Wagner family (The Wagners: The Dramas of a Musical Dynasty, Princeton, New Jersey, Princeton University Press, 2001). Her article questioning the propriety of public subsidies given to high-profile cultural events in general, and the Bayreuth Festival in particular (at present c. US$6.5 million annually), Im Fadenkreuz der Kulturpolitik, published in the July 2006 issue of Cicero: Magazin für politische Kultur, engendered controversy within Germany.

In 1999 Wagner became a member of the Deutsche Akademie für Sprache und Dichtung, and has served as its vice president since 2011. In 2001, she made a bid for directorship of the Bayreuth Festival, together with Gérard Mortier, who had changed the Salzburg Festival, but did not expect to win. In 2004, Wagner became the director of the Kunstfest Weimar, which she named Pèlerinages in honour of Liszt. She stood down from the post in September 2013.

In 2013 she was named the director of the Beethovenfest, and assumed this post in January 2014. She has recognized Wagner's relation to Beethoven, who modeled his first composition on Beethoven's works. She focused less on Beethoven's symphonies, but presented more chamber music, often in contrast with contemporary works in the genre.

== Other activities ==
- Bonner Akademie für Forschung und Lehre praktischer Politik (BAPP), Member of the Board of Trustees
- Deutsche Bank, Member of the Advisory Board (since 2017)
- Goethe Institute, Member of the Committee for the Goethe Medal

== Selected publications ==
- Nike Wagner, et al., Mann, sei nicht so hysterisch (Munich, Matthes und Seitz, 1991).
- Nike Wagner, Wagner-Theater (Frankfurt am Main, Insel-Verlag, 1998).
- Nike Wagner, Traumtheater: Szenarien der Moderne (Frankfurt am Main, Insel-Verlag, 2001).

== Awards ==
- 1999: member of the Deutsche Akademie für Sprache und Dichtung
- member of the Literaturklasse of the Sächsische Akademie der Künste
- 2012: Honorary professor at the Pädagogische Hochschule Heidelberg
- 2013: Order of Merit of the Free State of Thuringia
- 2022 Honorary doctorate of the University of Music Franz Liszt Weimar

== See also ==
- Erich Heller
- Wagner family tree
