= Wolfgang Wagner =

20th and 21st-century German director of the Bayreuth Theatre

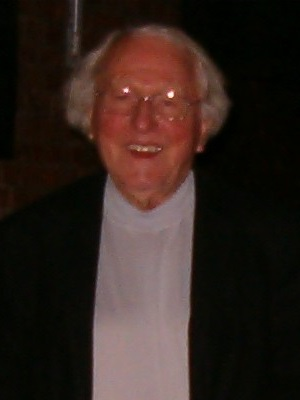
Wolfgang Wagner in 2004.

Wolfgang Wagner (30 August 1919 – 21 March 2010) was a German opera director. He is best known as the director (Festspielleiter) of the Bayreuth Festival, a position he initially assumed alongside his brother Wieland in 1951 until the latter's death in 1966. From then on, he assumed total control until he retired in 2008, although many of the productions which he commissioned were severely criticized in their day. He had been plagued by family conflicts and criticism for many years. He was the son of Siegfried Wagner (the son of Richard Wagner) and he was the great-grandson of Franz Liszt.

== Biography ==
His mother, Winifred Wagner (née Williams-Klindworth), was English. He was born at Wahnfried, the Wagner family home in Bayreuth in Bavaria. In addition to his elder brother Wieland (1917–66), he had an elder sister Friedelind Wagner (1918–1991), and a younger sister Verena Wagner (1920–2019).

During the 1920s Winifred Wagner was an admirer, supporter and friend of the Nazi leader Adolf Hitler, who became a regular visitor to Bayreuth a decade before he assumed power in Germany. Wolfgang Wagner first met Hitler in 1923, when he was four years old, and the Wagner children were encouraged to call him "Uncle Adolf" or "Uncle Wolf" (his nickname). When Hitler became Chancellor in 1933, he showered favours on the Wagner family. Wolfgang was a member of the Hitler Youth but never joined the Nazi Party. He joined the German Army in 1939. During the Polish campaign he was severely wounded in the arm, and he was discharged as medically unfit in June 1940 (Hitler visited him in the hospital).

Wagner married twice, to Ellen Drexel (1919–2002) and Gudrun Mack (1944–2007). He has three children: Eva, born 1945, Gottfried, born 1947 and Katharina, born 1978. He was reportedly estranged from his daughter Eva over control of the Bayreuth Festival, while Gottfried, who has long been publicly critical, and was banned from the family villa in 1975, only learned of his father's death from media coverage. According to Gottfried's autobiography Twilight of the Wagners: The Unveiling of a Family's Legacy (1997, English version: 1999), his father told him in the 1950s: "Hitler cured unemployment and restored worldwide respect for the German economy. He freed our people from a moral crisis and united all decent forces. We Wagners have him to thank for the idealistic rescue of the Bayreuth festival."

Eva was eventually named as his successor as the director of the Bayreuth Festival in conjunction with his preferred candidate, her half-sister Katharina, after the two women reached an agreement following the death of his second wife who was Katharina's mother.

== Career ==
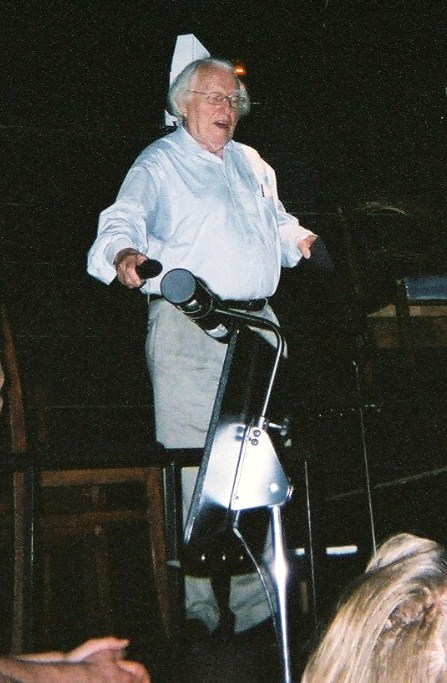
Wolfgang Wagner in 2004

Wolfgang worked with his older brother Wieland Wagner in 1951 on the resurrection of the Bayreuth Festival following Germany's defeat in the Second World War. Since that time, the festival has run on an annual basis. On Wieland's death in 1966, Wolfgang became the sole director of the festival and, under his directorship, the famous Bayreuth Festspielhaus underwent extensive renovations. He stepped down on 31 August 2008 when the year's festival had finished.

Both brothers contributed productions to the Bayreuth Festival, but Wolfgang did not enjoy the same critical reception as Wieland did. Like his brother, Wolfgang favoured modern, minimalist stagings of his grandfather's works in his productions. As director of the festival, Wolfgang commissioned work from many guest producers, including innovative and controversial stagings such as the 1976 production of the Ring Cycle by Patrice Chéreau. However, he confined the stagings at the festival to the last ten operas by his grandfather that make up the Bayreuth canon established under the direction of his grandmother Cosima Wagner.

Wolfgang attracted some criticism for what was seen as his autocratic sway over the Festival, much of which comes from within the Wagner family itself. Wieland's daughters, Daphne and Nike Wagner, have accused their uncle of ill-treating their branch of the family, saying that he drove them and their mother out of Wahnfried, the family home, following their father's death and destroyed the scenery, models and correspondence with artists relating to their father's work. Wagner writer Barry Millington notes two rather inconsistent threads of criticism about Wolfgang's role in managing the presentation of the family's connection with the Nazis. Daphne accuses him of blackening her father's name by releasing information on Wieland's connection with the Bayreuth satellite of the Flossenbürg concentration camp, while Wolfgang's own son, Gottfried, accuses him of having tried to suppress all information about the Wagner grandchildren's connection with the Nazis.

Nonetheless, he helped make the Bayreuth one of the most popular destinations in the world of opera. There was a ten-year waiting list for tickets. In 1994, he invited Werner Herzog (who had staged Lohengrin at Bayreuth in 1987) to make a documentary about the festival, which was released under the title Die Verwandlung der Welt in Musik (The Transformation of the World into Music).

== Notes ==
Sources

- Carr, Jonathan (2007). The Wagner Clan: The Saga of Germany's Most Illustrious and Infamous Family. Atlantic Monthly Press. ISBN 978-0-87113-975-7.
