= Bayreuth premiere cast of Parsifal =

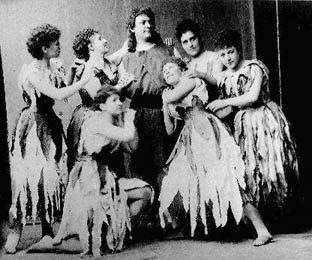
Hermann Winkelmann as Parsifal, 1882

The Bayreuth premiere cast of Parsifal lists the contributors to the new productions of Richard Wagner's inaugural stage play Parsifal, including the premiere, which took place on 26 July 1882 at the Bayreuth Festival.

== About the performance history ==
In the last performance of the premiere series in 1882, Richard Wagner personally took over the baton from Hermann Levi in Act III, unnoticed by the audience, since the overbuilt orchestra pit of the Festspielhaus made the conductor and the orchestra invisible to the public. It was the only time the composer conducted in his house himself.

Parsifal was composed especially for the Bayreuth Festival Theatre and, as Wagner stated in a letter to King Ludwig II of Bavaria in 1880, was to be performed there exclusively. The premiere production was virtually sacrosanct in Bayreuth and remained almost unchanged on the festival programme for 51 years. Hermann Levi remained conductor until 1894, only in 1888 (and then in 1897) Felix Mottl conducted Felix Mottl. Later, Franz Fischer and Karl Muck also took over the musical direction of the Parsifal festival performances.

The protection period of 30 years after the composer's death ended on December 31, 1913, but as early as 1901, the widow of the composer and director of the Festival, Cosima Wagner, turned to the German Reichstag with the request to secure the sole performing rights for Bayreuth. The request was rejected. Already before the end of the protection period, unauthorized performances took place, for example at the Metropolitan Opera in New York on 24 December 1903, on Cosima's 66th birthday, and in Amsterdam.

After the end of the protection period, forty productions of the work were staged within the month of January 1914. The first of these legal productions began on New Year's Eve 1913 at 11:30 a.m. in the Teatro Liceu of Barcelona. To this day Parsifal is the most frequently performed work of the Bayreuth Festival.

=== 1934 ===
It was not until 1934 that a new production with stage designs by Alfred Roller, Hitler's favourite stage designer, was shown, commissioned by Hitler. After the politically motivated cancellation of Arturo Toscanini, who was supposed to conduct the new production, Richard Strauss stepped in.

After the beginning of the Second World War, the work - presumably because of its message of reconciliation - was no longer allowed to be performed in Bayreuth at Hitler's behest. As if by a miracle, the Bayreuth Festival Theatre was not destroyed in the Allied bombing war, but two thirds of the city lay in ruins. Half of the Villa Wahnfried was also destroyed on 5 April 1945, and the hall, including the rotunda and the floor above it, as well as the southeastern part of the house were blown up.

=== 1951 ===
When the Bayreuth Festival was able to reinstate itself in 1951, the new artistic director of the Festival, Wieland Wagner presented a radical new version of Parsifal as the first production of the "New Bayreuth". He dispensed with a detailed naturalism and placed the music in the foreground through abstraction and suggestive lighting direction. The events on stage were expressively condensed and only underlined by extremely withdrawn, stylized and meaningful gestures and movements. His Bayreuth staging style became a much-copied model for numerous Wagner productions up to the 1970s. The new production was conducted by Hans Knappertsbusch and has also been released on record. Wieland Wagner's production remained on the Bayreuth repertoire for more than twenty years and reached 101 performances. The premiere was cast with the world's best Wagner singers, including Wolfgang Windgassen in the title role, Martha Mödl as Kundry and George London as Amfortas.

== Premiere castings ==
The sixth column shows the number of performances of each production.

Amfortas Titurel Gurnemanz	Parsifal	Kundry Klingsor Voice from above	Two Knights of the Grail Four Squires	Klingsor's Maiden of Sorcery	
26 July 1882 premiere, staging: Richard Wagner, conductor: Hermann Levi, stage design: Max Brückner, Paul von Joukowsky, Siegfried Wagner, Kurt Söhnlein; This production was shown at the Bayreuth Festival until 1933.
Theodor Reichmann; August Kindermann; Emil Scaria	Hermann Winkelmann	Amalie Materna; Karl Hill; Sophie Dompierre	Anton von Fuchs, Eugen Stumpf; Hermine Galfy, Mathilde Keil, Max Mikorey, Adolf von Hübbenet	Pauline Horson, Johanna Meta, Carrie Pringle, Johanna André, Hermine Galfy, Luise Reuss-Belce	205
1934–1936 staging: Heinz Tietjen, conductor: Richard Strauss, stage design: Alfred Roller, Emil Preetorius
Herbert Janssen; Franz Sauer; Ivar Andresen	Helge Rosvaenge	Marta Fuchs; Robert Burg; Rut Berglund	Fritz Marcks, Hans Wrana; Irmingard Scheidemantel, Edith Neudahm, Gerhard Witting, Edwin Heyer	Käthe Heidersbach, Irene Hoebink, Hildegard Weigel, Franziska von Dobay, Irmingard Scheidemantel, Margery Booth	11
1937–1939 staging: Heinz Tietjen, conductor: Wilhelm Furtwängler, stage design and costumes: Wieland Wagner
Herbert Janssen; Michael von Roggen; Josef von Manowarda	Max Lorenz	Marta Fuchs; Robert Burg; Rut Berglund	Ferdinand Bürgmann, Carl Schlottmann; Hilde Scheppan, Beate Asserson, Erich Zimmermann, Edwin Heyer	Käthe Heidersbach, Elfriede Marherr, Beate Asserson, Anny von Stosch, Hilde Scheppan, Rut Berglund	15
1951–1973 staging: Wieland Wagner, conductor: Hans Knappertsbusch, furnishings: Wieland Wagner, Charlotte Vocke
George London; Arnold van Mill; Ludwig Weber	Wolfgang Windgassen	Martha Mödl; Hermann Uhde; Ruth Siewert	Walter Fritz, Werner Faulhaber; Hanna Ludwig, Elfriede Wild, Günter Baldauf, Gerhard Stolze	Lore Wissmann, Erika Zimmermann, Hanna Ludwig, Paula Brivkalne, Maria Lacorn, Elfriede Wild	101
1975–1981 staging: Wolfgang Wagner, conductor: Horst Stein, furnishings: Wolfgang Wagner, Reinhard Heinrich
Bernd Weikl; Karl Ridderbusch; Hans Sotin	René Kollo	Eva Randová; Franz Mazura; Ortrun Wenkel	Heribert Steinbach, Nikolaus Hillebrand; Trudeliese Schmidt, Hanna Schwarz, Martin Finke, Martin Egel	Hannelore Bode, Trudeliese Schmidt, Hanna Schwarz, Yoko Kawahara, Irja Auroora, Alicia Nafé	39
1982–1988 staging: Götz Friedrich, conductor: James Levine, furnishings: Andreas Reinhardt
Simon Estes; Matti Salminen; Hans Sotin	Peter Hofmann	Leonie Rysanek; Franz Mazura; Hanna Schwarz	Toni Krämer, Matthias Hölle; Ruthild Engert-Ely, Sabine Fues, Helmut Pampuch, Peter Maus	Monika Schmitt, Anita Soldh, Hanna Schwarz, Francine Laurent-Gérimont, Deborah Sasson, Margit Neubauer	33
1989–2001 staging: Wolfgang Wagner, conductor: James Levine, furnishings: Wolfgang Wagner, Reinhard Heinrich
Bernd Weikl; Matthias Hölle; Hans Sotin	William Pell	Waltraud Meier; Franz Mazura; Hitomi Katagiri	Richard Brunner, Sándor Sólyom-Nagy; Carmen Anhorn, Annette Küttenbaum, Helmut Pampuch, Peter Maus	Christiane Hossfeld, Carmen Anhorn, Alexandra Bergmeister, Hilde Leidland, Deborah Sasson, Jane Turner	65
2004–2007 staging: Christoph Schlingensief, conductor: Pierre Boulez, furnishings: Thomas George, Daniel Angermahr, Tabea Braun, lighting: Voxi Bärenklau
Alejandro Marco-Buhrmester; Kwangchul Youn; Robert Holl	Endrik Wottrich	Michelle de Young; John Wegner; Simone Schröder	Tomislav Mužek, Samuel Youn; Julia Borchert, Atala Schöck, Norbert Ernst, Miljenko Turk	Julia Borchert, Martina Rüping, Carola Guber, Anna Korondi, Jutta Maria Böhnert, Atala Schöck	21
2008–2012 staging: Stefan Herheim, conductor: Daniele Gatti, furnishings: Heike Scheele, Gesine Völlm, video: Momme Hinrichs, Torge Møller
Detlef Roth; Diógenes Randes; Kwangchul Youn	Christopher Ventris	Mihoko Fujimura; Thomas Jesatko; Simone Schröder	Arnold Bezuyen, Friedemann Röhlig; Julia Borchert, Ulrike Helzel, Clemens Bieber, Timothy Oliver	Julia Borchert, Martina Rüping, Carola Guber, Anna Korondi, Jutta Maria Böhnert, Ulrike Helzel	29
2016 staging: Uwe Eric Laufenberg, conductor: Hartmut Haenchen, furnishings: Gisbert Jäkel, Jessica Karge, lighting: Reinhard Traub
Ryan McKinny; Karl-Heinz Lehner; Georg Zeppenfeld	Klaus Florian Vogt	Elena Pankratova; Gerd Grochowski; Wiebke Lehmkuhl	Tansel Akzeybek, Timo Riihonen; Alexandra Steiner, Mareike Morr, Charles Kim, Stefan Heibach	Anna Siminska, Katharina Persicke, Mareike Morr, Alexandra Steiner, Bele Kumberger, Ingeborg Gillebo	6

== Sources ==
- Inszenierungsübersicht der Bayreuther Festspiele (vollständig ab 1951), retrieved 22 July 2020
- Tamino Autographs, Besetzungszettel der Aufführung vom 23. August 1934, retrieved 22 July 2020
- Tamino Autographs, Besetzungszettel der Aufführung vom 23. Juli 1937, retrieved 22 July 2020
