= Rut Berglund =

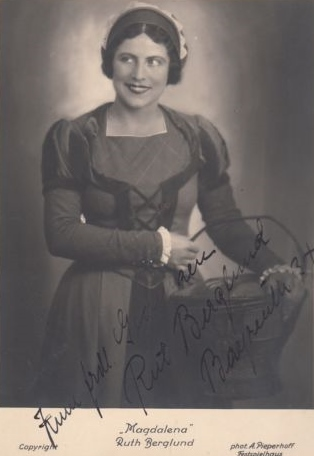
Autograph card, Bayreuth 1933

Rut Berglund, also Ruth Berglund (12 April 1897 – 29 August 1984) was a Swedish operatic mezzo-soprano and contralto, who was engaged in Germany from 1924 to 1944. She was personally appointed Kammersängerin by Adolf Hitler.

== Life and career ==
Born in Åmål, Berglund studied singing with Gillis Bratt in Stockholm and with Ernst Grenzebach in Berlin. In the 1924–25 season she was engaged as a volunteer at the Theater des Westens in Berlin, but due to hyperinflation the house was closed in 1925.

The singer subsequently made her debut at the Deutsche Oper Berlin, received a permanent engagement at this house and remained a member of the ensemble until 1932. Berglund married the surgeon Nathanael Wessén in 1927, the wedding took place in the church of her home town Åmål. In 1929 she took part in performances of Wagner's Der Ring des Nibelungen at the Grand Théâtre de Genève. In the season 1932-33 she was engaged at the Stadttheater Königsberg in East Prussia. At the 1933 Bayreuth Festival, the year of the Machtergreifung by the Nazis, the singer took over the role of Magdalene in Wagner's Die Meistersinger von Nürnberg, directed and conducted by Heinz Tietjen. She sang several times - both in Bayreuth and in Berlin - in the presence of Adolf Hitler and must have been personally acquainted with him. In the autumn of 1933 she accepted a call to the Staatsoper Unter den Linden, the most representative opera house during the National Socialist era. There she sang a wide range of mezzo and contralto parts from the classical repertoire, including four central Verdi roles, Azucena, Eboli, Amneris and Emilia. Her preference, however, was for the Wagner roles.

In 1934 she sang Magdalene in the Meistersinger von Nürnberg again in Bayreuth as well as on guest performances in London and Paris. In London she also appeared as Adelaide in Arabella by Hugo von Hofmannsthal and Richard Strauss. In the German UFA feature film Fürst Woronzeff by Arthur Robison from 1934, Berglund - together with the tenor Walther Ludwig - appeared in the duet of Samson and Dalila from the opera of the same name by Camille Saint-Saëns. From 1936 to 1942 she returned to Bayreuth every year and took on various roles in the Der Ring des Nibelungen, including Floßhilde, several Valkyries and a Norn. In the 1937 Bayreuth premiere cast of Parsifal new production by Tietjen, but this time with Wilhelm Furtwängler at the podium, she sang the "voice from above" and embodied one of Klingsor's magical girls. In September 1938, she gave a guest performance - on the occasion of the Reichsparteitag as Magdalene at the Staatstheater Nürnberg.

On 20 April 1939, Hitler's 50th birthday, Berglund was personally appointed by the latter as Kammersängerin. The letter of appointment states that the singer lived at 12a Fontanestraße. At her home base, the Deutsche Staatsoper Berlin, she increasingly embodied German repertoire: in 1936 she sang in the cheerful opera Schirin und Gertraude by Paul Graener, which is today as forgotten as the two world premieres - Rembrandt and Schloß Dürande - in which she took part. Berglund remained a faithful member of the ensemble, and even after the total wartime deployment of the cultural workers on 1 September 1944, performed in a series of opera concerts and remained in Berlin until the fall of the Nazi regime.

According to Karl-Josef Kutsch and Leo Riemens, she enjoyed "a great reputation" as a concert singer. Berglund also performed under the direction of the conductors Herbert von Karajan, Richard Strauss and Bruno Walter.

In 1945 she fled from Berlin shortly before the end of the war and returned to Sweden. In the church where she had married, she performed publicly for the last time on 31 October 1949, at the wedding of her niece. She died in Stockholm at the age of 87, but is buried in the family grave in the northern cemetery of Åmål.

== Roles ==
=== Premieres ===
- 1937 Hendrike Stoffels in Rembrandt by Paul von Klenau (with Rudolf Bockelmann as partner) – Staatsoper Unter den Linden
- 1943 Priorin in Schloß Dürande von Othmar Schoeck – Staatsoper Unter den Linden

=== Repertoire ===
Auber:

- Lady Pamela in Fra Diavolo

Bizet:

- Title role in Carmen

Debussy:

- Geneviève in Pelléas et Mélisande

Mozart:

- 3rd lady and 3rd boy in The Magic Flute

Mussorgski:

- Marina in Boris Godunov

Puccini:

- Suzuki in Madama Butterfly

Saint-Saëns':

- Dalila in Samson et Dalila

Richard Strauss:

- Adelaide in Arabella

Tschaikowski:

- Larina in Eugene Onegin

Verdi:

- Azucena in Il trovatore
- Amneris in Aida
- Prinzessin Eboli in Don Carlos
- Emilia in Otello

Wagner:

- Brangäne im Tristan und Isolde
- Magdalene in Die Meistersinger von Nürnberg
- Fricka und Floßhilde in Das Rheingold
- Fricka and some Valkyries in Die Walküre
- Floßhilde and Norn in Götterdämmerung
- Voice from above and flower girl in Parsifal

== Recordings ==
A recording with the voice of the singer, the Frauenterzett with Tamino from Mozart's The Magic Flute, with Helge Rosvaenge, Hilde Scheppan and Elfriede Marherr, published in the series Große Sänger Große Oper by Top Classic Historia on vinyl in 1971, performed by the Berliner Philharmoniker conducted by Sir Thomas Beecham.

In a complete recording of The Magic Flute on HMV she sang both the 3rd lady and the 3rd boy. Furthermore, there are excerpts from three German operas: from Engelbert Humperdinck's Hänsel und Gretel (on Electrola), from Richard Wagner's Die Meistersinger von Nürnberg (as Magdalene, Nürnberg 1938, Koch/ Schwann) as well as Othmar Schoeck's Das Schloß Dürande (on Jecklin Disco).

== Sources ==
- Karl-Josef Kutsch, Leo Riemens: Großes Sängerlexikon. 4th edition. K. G. Saur Verlag, Munich 2003, ISBN 978-3-598-44088-5, p. 365, also available on Isoldes Liebestod, keyword: Ruth Berglund
