= Hilde Scheppan =

German operatic soprano (1907–1970)

- Born: 17 September 1907; Forst, Province of Brandenburg, German Empire
- Died: 24 September 1970 (aged 63); Bayreuth, Bavaria, West Germany
- Occupations: Operatic soprano; Academic teacher
- Organizations: Staatsoper Unter den Linden; Hochschule für Musik Nürnberg; Musikhochschule München

Hilde Scheppan (17 September 1907 – 24 September 1970) was a German operatic soprano and academic teacher. She was engaged for 20 years at the Staatsoper Unter den Linden in Berlin and made guest appearances at the Bayreuth Festival from 1937 to 1958. She performed roles in Wagner's stage works in productions by Heinz Tietjen both in Berlin and Bayreuth. After World War II, she first continued work in Berlin, but then moved to the Staatsoper Stuttgart. She taught as a professor of voice at the Hochschule für Musik Nürnberg and the Musikhochschule München.

== Life and career ==
Born in Forst in Lusatia, Scheppan studied at the Musikhochschule Berlin, and with Emy von Stetten. From 1934 she belonged to the ensemble of the Staatsoper Unter den Linden in Berlin, first as a chorus singer. The same year, she made her debut as a soloist at the Staatstheater Darmstadt, and became a soloist in Berlin. In 1936 she appeared in the film Das Mädchen Irene. She appeared in some youthful dramatic (jugendlich-dramatisch) roles of the Italian repertoire, such as Leonore in Verdi's Il trovatore and Desdemona in Otello. On 12 May 1938, she participated in the world premiere of Mark Lothar's Schneider Wibbel. On 24 November 1938, she appeared in the world premiere of Werner Egk's Peer Gynt. She toured to Paris that year with the State Opera, as Leitmetzerin in Der Rosenkavalier and as Najade in Ariadne auf Naxos, both by Richard Strauss.

She made annual guest appearances at the Bayreuth Festival from 1937 to 1943, beginning with supporting roles such as a Rhinemaiden and two Valkyries in Der Ring des Nibelungen, and a Squire and a Flower Girl in Parsifal. In 1943 she appeared as Eva in Die Meistersinger von Nürnberg.

A focus of her repertoire was on roles in works by Richard Wagner and Richard Strauss – Irene in Rienzi, Senta in Der fliegende Holländer, Sieglinde in Die Walküre, Eva, Chrysothemis in Elektra, the Empress in Die Frau ohne Schatten and Freihild in Guntram. After World War II, the State Opera's performances took place in the Admiralspalast. Although Scheppan sang in Soviet-occupied East Berlin successfully until 1954, she lived in Charlottenburg.

From 1952 until 1957, Scheppan was an ensemble member of the Staatsoper Stuttgart. She gave guest performances in Amsterdam, Vienna, Zürich, Hamburg, Munich and Dresden. She settled in Bayreuth, and appeared at the Bayreuth Festival again, as Helmwige in 1954 to 1957, and as Ortlinde in 1958.

Towards the end of her stage career, she increasingly turned to teaching, initially at the Coburg Conservatory. In 1957, she was appointed professor at the Hochschule für Musik Nürnberg, where she led a class of advanced singers together with Willi Domgraf-Fassbaender. Finally, she was a professor at the Musikhochschule München.

Scheppan died in Bayreuth at the age of 63.

== Recordings ==
Although Scheppan sang mostly German repertoire on stage, audio documents of Italian operas have survived. In keeping with the spirit of the times, these works were sung in German, for example Nedda in Leoncavallo's Bajazzo recorded in 1943 with Helge Rosvaenge, Georg Hann, Carl Wessely and Karl Schmitt-Walter, conducted by Artur Rother. There is also a recording of her performing Santuzza in Mascagni's Cavalleria rusticana. She recorded excerpts of Verdi's La forza del destino, Aida and Othello, also sung in German.

She performed in a radio recording of excerpts from Wagner's Rienzi, as Irene. She was the First Lady in an iconic recording of Mozart's Die Zauberflöte, alongside Rut Berglund, Elfriede Marherr and Helge Rosvaenge, with the Berlin Philharmonic conducted by Thomas Beecham. She performed in excerpts from Weber's Der Freischütz, and in a complete recording of the Franz Schmidt's Notre Dame.

Her Bayreuth performances of Eva, conducted in 1943 by Hermann Abendroth, and Ortlinde, conducted in 1958 by Hans Knappertsbusch, were recorded. Reviewer Alan Blyth of Gramophone noted in 1994:

Hilde Scheppan, not a highly rated artist, proves a dream of an Eva, surpassing even the excellent but ageing Müller for Furtwängler and matching Grümmer in the 1956 Kempe version (EMI, 2/93). She sings easily and naturally off the words with Reining-like radiance, sustains "O Sachs, mein Freund" with a flood of tone and leads the Quintet serenely. What more can one ask?
