= Artur Rother =

German conductor

Artur Martin Rother (12 October 1885 – 22 September 1972) was a German conductor who worked mainly in the opera house.

He was born in Stettin, Pomerania (now Szczecin, Poland). His father was an organist and music teacher. He studied under Hugo Kaun and other teachers. By the age of 20, in 1906, he was conducting in Wiesbaden, and was assistant conductor for the Bayreuth Festival 1907-14. He was Generalmusikdirektor in Dessau 1927-34.

After the Nazis came to power in Germany, Rother joined the Militant League for German Culture (Kampfbund für deutsche Kultur) 1933 for one year, but was not a member of the Nazi Party.

From 1934 he conducted at the Deutsche Oper Berlin, succeeding Bruno Walter, and was appointed Generalmusikdirektor there in 1937. In 1941, he brought out his own edition of Mozart's Idomeneo. Hans Schmidt-Isserstedt succeeded him. From 1946 to 1949 he was chief conductor of the Berlin Radio Symphony Orchestra, based in East Berlin. Subsequently, he was a guest conductor of the RIAS Symphony Orchestra and the Städtische Oper Berlin. He was guest conductor with the Berlin Philharmonic in 1960-61, and an honorary member of the Deutsche Oper Berlin from 1965. Between 1935 and 1964, he conducted 41 concerts with the Berlin Philharmonic (and also concerts in Paris and Spain.)

He died in Aschau im Chiemgau in 1972, aged 86.

== Recordings ==
Artur Rother's recordings include excerpts from operas by Beethoven (Fidelio), Bizet (Carmen), Boieldieu (La dame blanche), Glinka (Ruslan and Ludmila), Flotow (Alessandro Stradella), Gluck (Iphigénie en Aulide), Gounod (Faust), Humperdinck (Hänsel und Gretel), Leoncavallo (Pagliacci), Mascagni (Cavalleria rusticana), Mozart (The Magic Flute, The Marriage of Figaro), Nicolai (The Merry Wives of Windsor), Offenbach (The Tales of Hoffmann), Puccini (La bohème, Madama Butterfly), Richard Strauss (Salome), Tchaikovsky (Eugene Onegin, The Queen of Spades), Verdi (Don Carlos, The Sicilian Vespers, Simon Boccanegra, Il trovatore), Wagner (Lohengrin, Die Meistersinger von Nürnberg, Rienzi, Tannhäuser), and Weber (Der Freischütz, Oberon).

Singers who sang under his baton included: Peter Anders, Erna Berger, Walter Berry, Kim Borg, Maria Cebotari, Dietrich Fischer-Dieskau, Josef Greindl, Hans Hotter, James King, Margarete Klose, Tiana Lemnitz, Max Lorenz, Christa Ludwig, Walther Ludwig, Martha Mödl, Helge Rosvaenge, Heinrich Schlusnus, Karl Schmitt-Walter, Rita Streich, Ludwig Suthaus, Wolfgang Windgassen and Fritz Wunderlich,

He conducted an early experimental stereo recording using magnetic tape during late 1944 or early 1945 of Beethoven's "Emperor" Concerto with Walter Gieseking in which anti-aircraft guns can be heard firing during the quiet passages; it is one of only three such recordings known to survive.

In 1953, he accompanied pianist Margot Pinter in recording for Urania of piano concerto n° 2 by Tchaikovsky.

A decade later, at the beginning of the commercial stereo era, he accompanied pianist Jakob Gimpel in recordings for Ariola of piano concertos by Beethoven (No.4), Grieg and Schumann.

He also recorded Beethoven's G major Violin Romance and Tchaikovsky's Violin Concerto with Georg Kulenkampff; and Khachaturian's Violin Concerto in D minor with Gerhard Taschner.
