= Schlottmann =

Schlottmann is a surname. Notable people with the surname include:

- Austin Schlottmann (born 1995), American National Football League player
- Carl Schlottmann (1901–1967), German operatic bass
- William F. Schlottmann (1824–1903), American politician

== See also ==
- 21733 Schlottmann, a minor planet.
