= Maria Ilona =

1939 film directed by Géza von Bolváry

- Directed by: Géza von Bolváry
- Written by: Oswald Richter-Tersik (novel); Richard Billinger; Werner Eplinius; Philipp Lothar Mayring
- Produced by: Viktor von Struwe
- Starring: Paula Wessely; Willy Birgel; Paul Hörbiger; Hedwig Bleibtreu
- Cinematography: Ewald Daub
- Edited by: Wolfgang Wehrum
- Music by: Alois Melichar
- Production company: Terra Film
- Distributed by: Terra Film
- Release date: 14 December 1939
- Running time: 94 minutes
- Country: Germany
- Language: German

Maria Ilona is a 1939 German historical drama film directed by Géza von Bolváry and starring Paula Wessely, Willy Birgel, and Paul Hörbiger. The film is set in Austria during the reign of Ferdinand I. It is an adaptation of Oswald Richter-Tersik's novel Ilona Beck.

== Cast ==
- Paula Wessely as Maria Ilona von Wolkersdorf
- Willy Birgel as Karl Felix Fürst zu Schwarzenberg
- Paul Hörbiger as Ferdinand V., Kaiser von Österreich
- Hedwig Bleibtreu as Erzherzogin Sophie
- Hermann Brix as Franz Joseph, ihr Sohn
- Otto Wernicke as Fürst Windischgrätz
- Rosa Albach-Retty as Fürstin Lobkowitz
- Bruno Hübner as Pospischill
- Paul Hubschmid as Imre von Hontos, Maria Ilonas Bruder
- Richard Häussler as Ludwig Kossuth
- Karl Günther as Oberst Görgey
- Heinz von Cleve as Major von Meszaros
- Theodor Danegger as Anton
- Franz Schafheitlin as Hauptmann von Sailern, Adjutant Schwarzenbergs
- Elisabeth Markus as Therese, Mädchen bei Maria Illona
- Peter Elsholtz as Pista, der Bärenbändiger
- Hubert von Meyerinck as Pizzi, der Scherenschnittkünstler
- Karl Etlinger as Nachtwächter
- Klaus Pohl as Sternengucker
- Anton Pointner as Brühwasser, Adjutant des Kaisers Ferdinand
- Vera Complojer as Wasserverkäuferin
- Magnus Stifter as Obershofmeister
- Viktor Afritsch as Offizier des Österreichischen Generalstabs
- Erna Berger as Sopran, Staatsoper
- Angelo Ferrari as Ungarischer Offizier beim Hofball
- Harry Hardt as Adjutant des Kaisers Franz Joseph
- Ludmilla Hell as Junge Zigeunerin
- Eduard Kandl as Baß, Deutsches Opernhaus
- Alfred Karen as Gast beim Hofball
- Wolfgang Klein as Ungarischer Offizier beim Hofball
- Peter C. Leska as Ungarischer Offizier beim Hofball
- Walther Ludwig as Tenor, Deutsches Opernhaus
- Georg A. Profé as Ungarischer Offizier beim Hofball
- Josef Reithofer as Erster Offizier des österreichischen Generalstabs
- Lotte Spira as Gattin des Kaisers Ferdinand
- Carla Spletter as Sopran, Staatsoper
- Erich Zimmermann as Tenor, Staatsoper

== Bibliography ==
- Bock, Hans-Michael; Bergfelder, Tim, eds. (2009). The Concise Cinegraph: Encyclopaedia of German Cinema. New York: Berghahn Books. ISBN 978-1-57181-655-9.
