= Mužek =

Mužek is a surname. Notable people with the surname include:

- Damir Mužek (born 1967), Croatian footballer
- Mateo Mužek (born 1995), Croatian footballer
- Tomislav Mužek (born 1976), Croatian opera singer
