= Lamento d'Arianna discography =

This discography is a partial list of recordings of "Lamento d'Arianna" (Ariadne's lament), the only surviving fragment of music from the lost opera L'Arianna (1608) by Claudio Monteverdi (1567–1643). The lament was saved from oblivion by the composer's decision to publish it independently from the opera; in 1614 as a five-voice madrigal, and in 1623 as an accompanied solo. The madrigal version was included in Monteverdi's Sixth Book of Madrigals. It appears in recordings of that collection, and in other madrigal selections.

Recordings of the solo version are more plentiful. Most of these employ a female voice, usually either a soprano or mezzo-soprano, but two contralto versions are available. There are also male voice versions for baritone, tenor and countertenor. The year and the label information are generally those of the most recent issue, and do not necessarily relate to the initial recording.

== Five-voice madrigal (1614) ==
The 5-voice version of Lamento d'Arianna is included in all recordings of Monteverdi's Sixth Book of Madrigals.

| Year of issue | Album title | Performers | Label | Refs |
|---|---|---|---|---|
| | Banchieri:La Pazzia Senile; Monteverdi: Seven Madrigals (selection of seven madrigals from various books) | Sestetto Italiano Luca Marenzio | LP: DGG QAPM14132 | |
| 1967 | Monteverdi: Madrigals (selection of madrigals from various books) | April Cantelo, Eileen Poulter (sopranos), Helen Watts (contralto), Gerald English, Robert Tear (tenors), Christopher Keyte (bass), conductor: Raymond Leppard (harpsichord) | LP: HMV HQS1102 | |
| 1981 | Monteverdi: Madrigals (anthology from 6th, 7th, 8th and 9th books) | Marjanne Kweksilber (sop); René Jacobs (alto); Marius van Altena, Michiel ten Houte de Lange (tenors); Floris Rommart (bass); Gustav Leonherdt (harpsichord) | LP: RCA RL30390 | |
| 1985 | Lamento d'Arianna. Various Settings (a collection which includes settings by other composers) | The Consort of Musicke conductor: Anthony Rooley | LP: Deutsche Harmonia Mundi 1C 16516904-3 | |
| 1990 | Monteverdi: Madrigali (7-disc set: complete 1st, 2nd, 3rd, 6th, 7th and 8th books) | The Consort of Musicke conductor: Anthony Rooley | CD: Virgin 0833972 | |
| 2005 | Monteverdi: Il sesto libro de madrigali, 1614 (complete Sixth Book) | La Venexiana conductor: Claudio Cavina | CD: Glossa GCD920926 | |
| 2007 | Monteverdi: Il sesto libro de madrigali, 1614 (2-disc set: complete 5th and 6th books) | Delitiae Musicae conductor: Marco Longhini | CD: Naxos 8555312-13 | |
| 2008 | Monteverdi – Madrigali Libro V & VI (2-disc set: complete 5th and 6th books) | Nuove Musiche conductor: Krijn Koetsveld | CD: Brilliant Classics 93799 | |
| 2011 | Baroque Voices 47 – Monteverdi: Sixth Book of Madrigals (complete 6th book) | Concerto Italiano conductor: Rinaldo Alessandrini | Naive Baroque Voices OP30522 | |

== Accompanied solo voice ==
| Year of issue | Album title | "Lamento" singer | Accompanying forces | Label | Refs |
|---|---|---|---|---|---|
| 1947 | "Lasciatemi morire" | Gabriella Gatti (soprano) | London Symphony Orchestra cond. Vincenzo Bellezza | Shellac 78 rpm (sides A and B): HMV DB6515 | |
| 1951 | Margarete Klose Recital | Margarete Klose (contralto) (Sung in German) | Prussian State Orchestra cond. Robert Heger | LP: Urania URLP 7017; CD: Berlin Classics 0033072 (2006) | |
| 1954 | Monteverim | Elisabeth Hongen (contralto) | Two harpsichords and double bass | LP: APM! 4020; EP: DGG EPA37011 (1959) | |
| 1973 | Monteverdi Madrigals | Karla Schlean (soprano) | Genuzio Ghetti (viola da gamba); Mariella Sorelli (harpsichord) | LP: Telefunken SAWT 959 | |
| 1985 | Lamento d'Arianna. Various Settings | Emma Kirkby (soprano) | The Consort of Musicke conductor: Anthony Rooley | LP: Deutsche Harmonia Mundi 1C 16516904-3 | |
| 1985 | Lamento d'Arianna | Nella Anfuso (soprano) | James Gray (harpsichord) | Auvidis AV 4883 | |
| 1993 | Songs of Love and War | Julianne Baird (soprano) | Colin Tilney (harpsichord); Myron Lutzke (cello) | CD: Dorian DOR90104 | |
| 1995 | Masterpieces for Choir | Margareta Enevold (soprano) | Kristian Buhl-Mortensen (lute); Lone Ekstrand (gamba) | CD: BIS BISCD148 | |
| 1996 | Lamenti Barocchi, Vol. 3 | Anna Caterina Antonacci (soprano) | San Petronio Cappella Musicale cond. Sergio Vartolo | CD: Naxos Early Music Collection 8553320 | |
| 1998 | Lamenti | Anne Sofie von Otter (mezzo-soprano) | Musica Antiqua Köln cond. Reinhard Goebel | CD: DG Archiv E4576172 | |
| 1999 | Tereza Berganza – Recital | Tereza Berganza (mezzo-soprano) | English Chamber Orchestra cond. Marcello Viotti | CD: Claves 509016 | |
| 2000 | Arie Antiche | Renato Bruson (baritone) | Rias-Sinfonietta Berlin cond. Roberto Paternostro | CD: Arts 475752 | |
| 2000 | Este Libro es de Don Luis Rossi | Cristiana Presutti (soprano) | Ensemble Poieses conductor: Marion Fourquier | CD: Zigzag ZZT000301 | |
| 2000 | Arietta | Inese Galante (soprano) | London Musici conductor: Mark Stephenson | CD: Campion Cameo RRCD1345 | |
| 2001 | Battaglie & Lamenti | Montserrat Figueras (soprano) | Hespèrion XXI; Jordi Savall | CD: Alia Vox AV9815 | |
| 2001 | A Voce Sola, con Sinfonie | Roberta Invernizzi (soprano) | Accademia Strumentale Italiana; Alberto Rasi | CD: Stradivarius STR33562 | |
| 2003 | Janet Baker | Janet Baker (mezzo-soprano) | English Chamber Orchestra cond. Raymond Leppard | CD: Testament SBT1321 | |
| 2005 | Italian Baroque Songs | Dénes Gulyás (tenor) | Budapest Baroque Trio | CD: Hungaroton HCD31480 | |
| 2005 | The Italian Dramatic Lament | Catherine Webster (soprano) | The Catacoustic Consort conductor: Annalisa Pappano | CD: Naxos Early Music Collection 8557538 | |
| 2006 | Anne Sofie von Otter sings Baroque arias | Anne Sofie von Otter (mezzo-soprano) | Drottingholm Baroque Ensemble | CD: Proprius PRCD9008 | |
| 2007 | Monteverdi: Lamento d'Arianna 'Lasciatemi morire'; Madrigals | Helga Müller-Molinari (mezzo-soprano) | Concerto Vocale conductor: René Jacobs | CD: Harmonia Mundi HMA1951129 | |
| 2008 | Lamenti | Véronique Gens (soprano) | Le Concert Astrée conductor: Emmanuelle Haïm | CD: Virgin 5190442 | |
| 2008 | The Art of Alfred Deller | Alfred Deller (countertenor) | The Deller Consort (Lute and two harpsichords) | CD: Alto ALC1018 | |
| 2009 | Monteverdi: Arie et Madrigali | Montserrat Figueras (soprano) | Ton Koopman (harpsichord) | CD: Alia Vox Heritage AVSA9884 | |
| 2009 | Monteverdi – Scherzi Musicali | Emmanuela Galli (soprano) | La Venexiana conductor: Claudio Cavina | CD: Glossa GCD920915 | |
| 2010 | Lamente: Furore e Dolore | Mareike Morr (mezzo-soprano) | Hannoversche Hofkapelle | CD: Genuin GEN10176 | |
| 2010 | Renata Tebaldi and Franco Corelli in Tokyo (1973) | Franco Corelli (tenor); Renata Tebaldi (soprano) | Tokyo Philharmonic Orchestra cond. Tadashi Mori | CD: Golden Melodram GM40077 | |
| 2010 | Respighi: Arianna – Liriche da Camera | Monica Bacelli (mezzo-soprano) | Aldo Orvieto (piano) | CD: Stradivarius STR33887 | |
