= Diógenes Randes =

Brazilian operatic bass

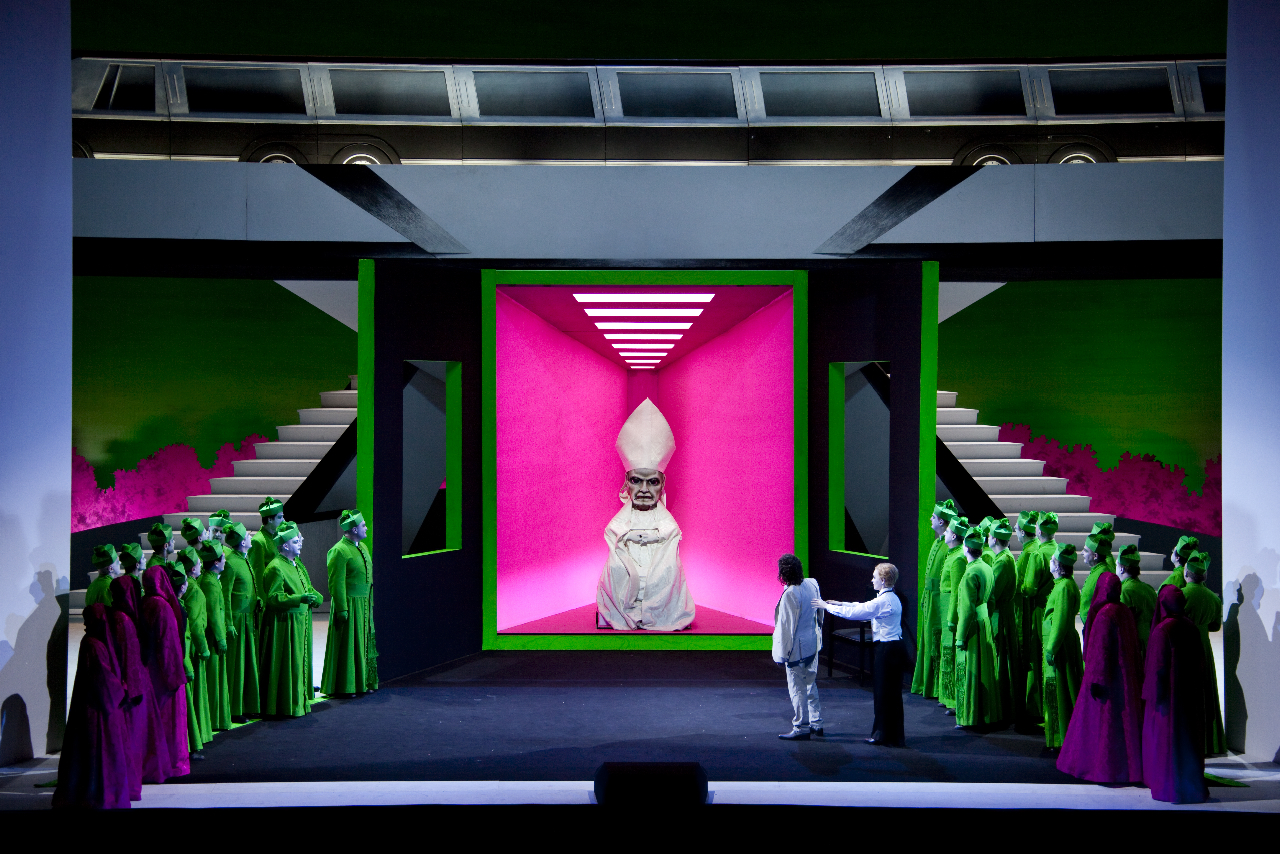
Diogenes Randes (centre, before red background) as Pope Pius IV. in Palestrina at the Hamburgische Staatsoper (2011)

Diógenes Randes is a Brazilian operatic bass.

== Life ==
Born in São Paulo, Randes studied at the State Conservatory of Music in his native town and continued his studies from 2000 at the Conservatoire a Rayonnement Départemental (CRD) in Colmar, France. In 2001, at the age of 24, he was engaged at the Theater Freiburg. In 2004, he joined the ensemble of the Aalto-Theater, then in 2008 the Hamburg State Opera. In 2007, he made his debut at the Bayreuth Festival. In 2008, he sang Titurel in Parsifal new production by Stefan Herheim.

His repertoire includes the title roles in Le nozze di Figaro and in Don Giovanni, Sarastro in Die Zauberflöte, Banco in Macbeth, Guglielmo in Così fan tutte, Ramfis in Aida, Daland im Der fliegende Holländer, Hans Foltz in Die Meistersinger von Nürnberg, Fafner im Das Rheingold and in Siegfried.

== Competitions and awards ==
- 2002: Finalist in the singing competition Competizione dell' Opera, Dresden
- 2005: 2nd prize in the Operalia competition, Madrid
