= Adolf von Hübbenet =

German tenor

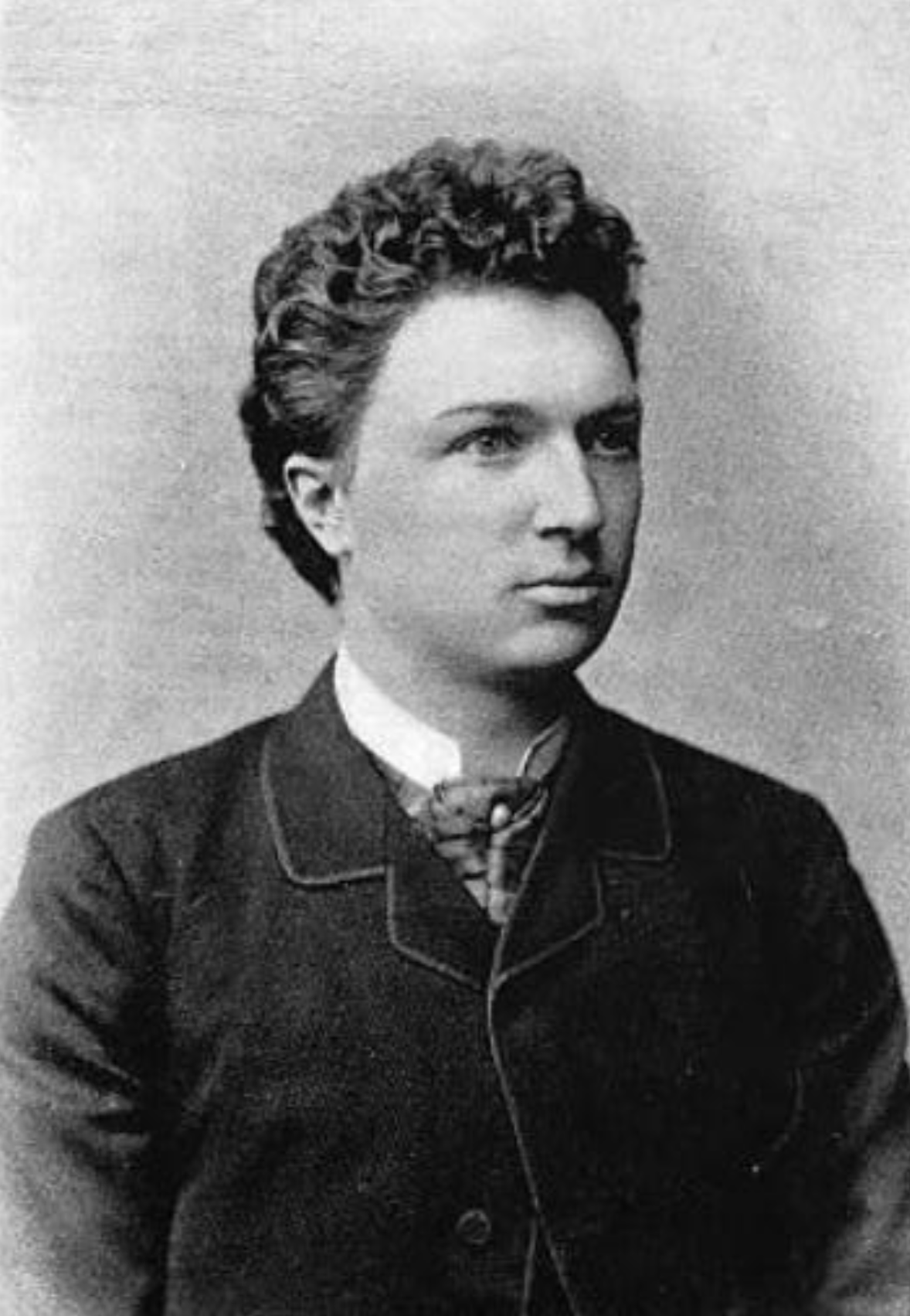
Adolf von Hübbenet in 1890.

Adolf von Hübbenet (1858 – 17 February 1903) was a German operatic tenor.

== Life ==
Hübbenet was born in Koblenz. On 26 July 1882 he was one of the four squires in the Bayreuth premiere cast of Parsifal.

Hübbenet was then engaged at the Staatsoper Hannover from 1882 to 1890, at the court theatre in Kassel from 1890 to 1892, at the city theatre in Stettin from 1893 to 1895, then again two years at the court theatre in Kassel and from 1898 at the city theatre in Düsseldorf. In 1901 the artist went to America to sing several roles including Wagner's Loge, Erik and David at the Metropolitan Opera. He died in 1903 in Koblenz.
