= Theodor Reichmann =

German baritone

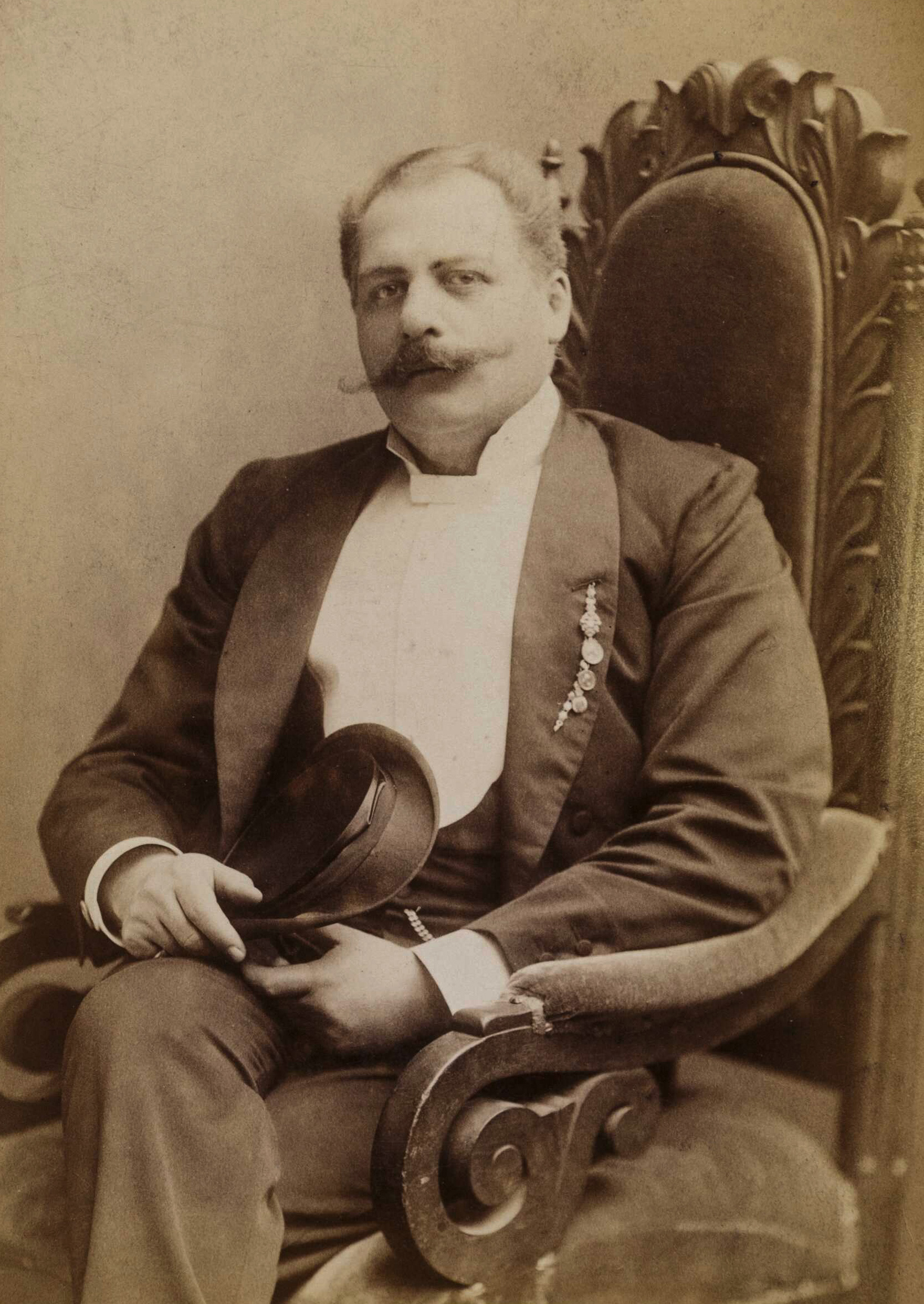
Reichmann, c. 1890 (photo by Benjamin Falk; Newberry Library, Chicago)

Theodor Reichmann (15 March 1849 – 22 May 1903) was a German operatic baritone. He had an active international performance career from 1869 until his death in 1903. Celebrated for his performances in the operas of Richard Wagner, he notably created the role of Amfortas in the world premiere of Wagner's Parsifal at the Bayreuth Festival in 1882.

== Early life and education ==
Theodor Reichmann was born in Rostock on 15 March 1849. Before his singing career he worked as a clerk at a cigar emporium, but was unhappy with this job and left it to pursue a career as an actor. By accident, it was discovered that he had a naturally good baritone voice and he subsequently shifted his focus to study singing with Johann Elssler, the brother of ballerina Fanny Elssler, in Berlin. He continued his vocal studies with Johannes Ress in Prague and Giovanni Battista Lamperti in Milan.

== Career ==
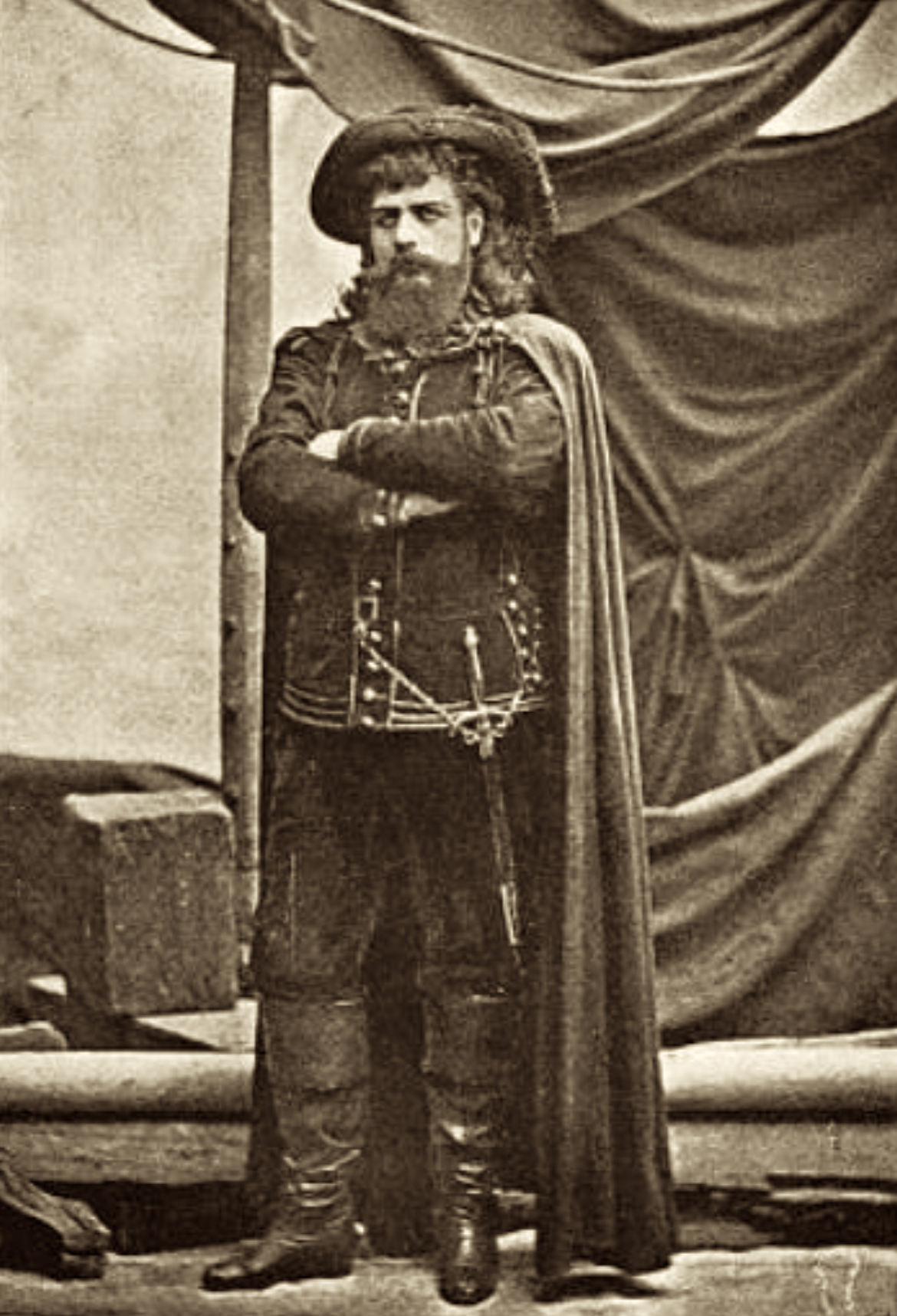
Reichmann in The Flying Dutchman, c. 1890

Reichmann made his debut at the Stadttheater Magdeburg as Ottokar in Carl Maria von Weber's Freischütz in 1869. He traveled as a guest artists for performances at the Nowak-Theatre in Berlin (1869-1870), the Deutschen Opernhaus in Rotterdam (1870), and the Strasbourg Opera House (1872). He gave his first performance at the Cologne Opera in 1871 as Conte di Luna in Giuseppe Verdi's Il trovatore. He was committed to the Hamburg State Opera (HSO) from 1872 to 1875. His first appearance with the HSO was as Friedrich of Telramund in Richard Wagner's Lohengrin.

In 1874 Reichmann made his debut with the Bavarian State Opera (BSO) at the National Theatre Munich in the title role of Gioachino Rossini's William Tell. He became a member of the BSO in 1875 with his first assignment with the company being the title part in Heinrich Marschner's Hans Heiling. He remained at the BSO through 1882. During his tenure with the BSO he performed in the first performances in the city of Munich of Aida (1877, as Amonasro), Siegfried (1878, as Wotan), and Der Rattenfänger von Hameln (1881, as the title character). In his late career he returned to the BSO for one final performance as Hans Sachs in Die Meistersinger von Nürnberg on August 11, 1902.

Reichmann was a member of Angelo Neumann's traveling Richard Wagner Theatre which toured Europe in 1882-1883. With this company he made his London debut at Her Majesty's Theater as Wotan in a complete performance of The Ring Cycle in 1882. He also gave his first performance at the Bayreuth Festival in 1882; notably creating the part of Amfortas in the world premiere cast of Wagner's Parsifal on July 26, 1882. He returned to Bayreuth repeatedly as Amfortas through 1902, and was also seen on the Bayreuth stage as Hans Sachs (1888 and 1889) and Wolfram von Eschenbach in Tannhäuser (1891).

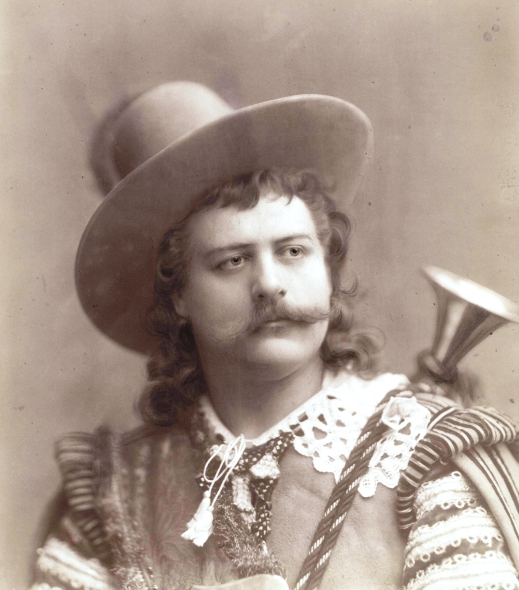
Reichmann as trumpeter of Säckingen

Reichmann was a frequent guest at the Frankfurt Opera from 1882-1885. He returned to London for his debut at the Royal Opera House (ROH) as Wagner's Telramund on June 11, 1884. That same year he performed two other roles at the ROH: title role in The Flying Dutchman and Hans Sachs. He later sang under Hans Richter as a guest artist at the ROH in 1892. In 1898 he performed as a guest artist at the Mariinsky Theatre in Saint Petersburg, Russia.

Reichmann was a member of the Vienna Court Opera (VCO) from 1883 to 1889 and again from 1893 until his death in 1903. Disagreements with the managers of the VCO led him to leave the company and accept a position with the Kroll Opera House (KOH) in Berlin where he was a resident artist from 1889 to 1891. In Vienna he performed the part of Iago in that city's first staging of Verdi's Otello.

During his interim period away from the VCO, Reichmann also performed at the Metropolitan Opera in New York City from 1889-1901. He was recruited to New York by the Met's director, Edmund C. Stanton. He made his debut at the Metropolitan Opera House as the Flying Dutchman on November 27, 1889, and was particularly celebrated at the Met as Rossini's William Tell. Other roles he sang at the Met included Amonasro, Escamillo in Carmen, Nélusko in L'Africaine, Renato in Un ballo in maschera, Solomon in Die Königin von Saba, Werner in Der Trompeter von Säckingen, the title role in Don Giovanni, and all of the Wagner parts in his repertoire.

With the Met, Reichman traveled to Chicago for performances of operas at the Auditorium Theatre in 1890. He also traveled with the company to Massachusetts in 1891 for performances of Il trovatore at the Boston Music Hall with Victor Herbert as conductor. A year earlier he performed works by Wagner and Tchaikovsky with the Boston Symphony Orchestra at the same venue. In 1891 he performed in concerts with an orchestra led by conductor Theodore Thomas in Philadelphia. He previously performed at the Academy of Music in that city in orchestra concerts with Max Bendix in 1890. In 1890 and 1891 Reichman also gave recitals in New York in collaboration with the violinist Franz Wilczek.

== Honors and death ==
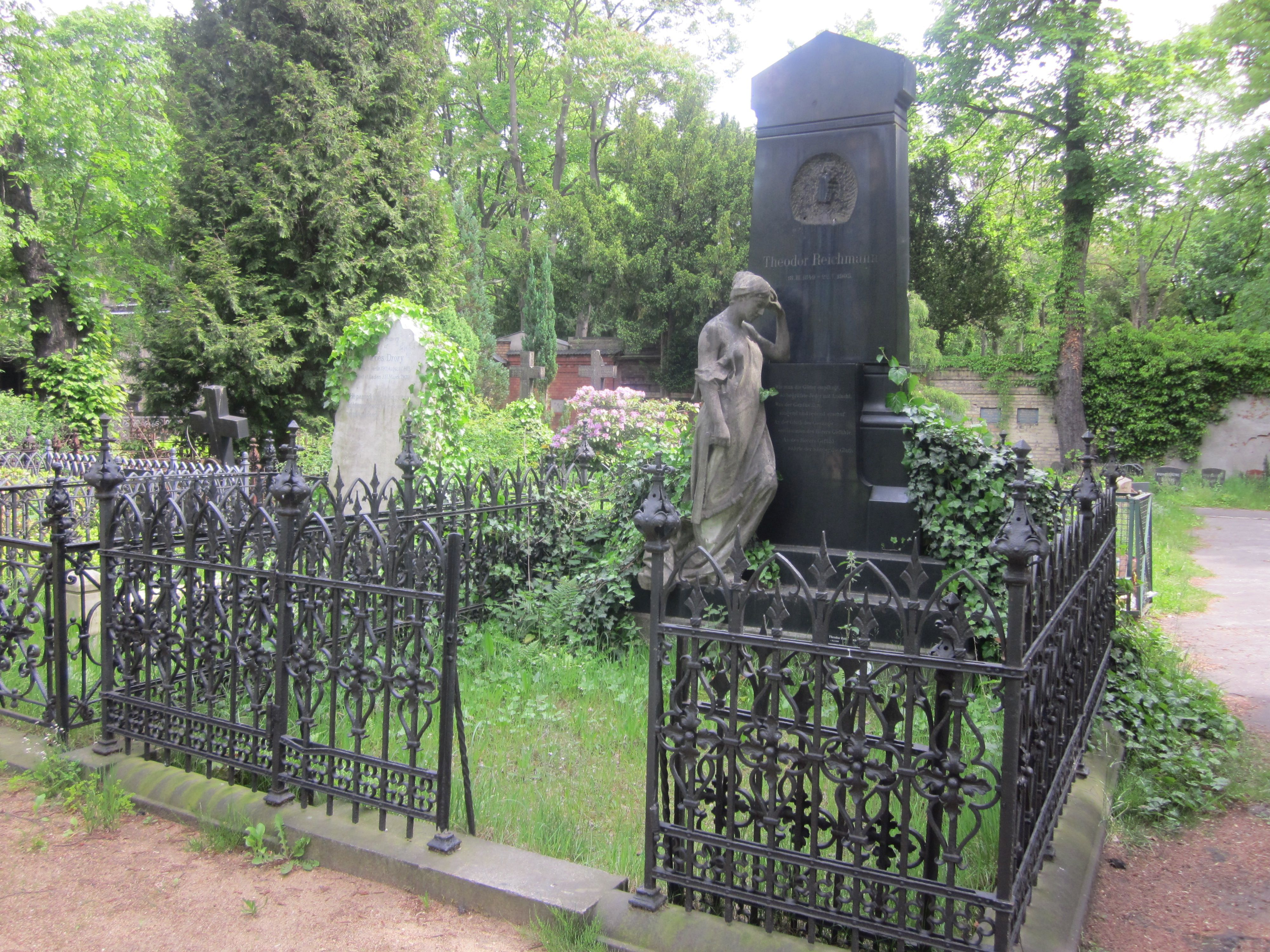
Grave of Theodor Reichmann in Berlin-Kreuzberg

In 1888 Reichmann was appointed Kammersänger. He was awarded the Order of Franz Joseph among others. The Reichmanngasse in Vienna is named after him.

Reichmann died on 22 May 1903 in Wangen (Öhningen) at the age of 54.

Already for a long time suffering from a heart condition, Reichmann died on 22 May 1903 - the 90th birthday of Richard Wagner – in Sanatorium Marbach in Bodensee following a stroke. Reichmann was buried in Berlin at the cemetery in front of the Hallesches Tor. In the preserved lattice tomb there is a multi-level funerary monument made of black granite, on which the marble sculpture of a mourner is leaning, created around 1904 in the stonemason workshop of Wilhelm Sipperling. It was unveiled in a ceremony on September 30, 1904.
