= Hochschule für Musik Nürnberg =

Musical conservatory in Nuremberg, Bavaria, Germany

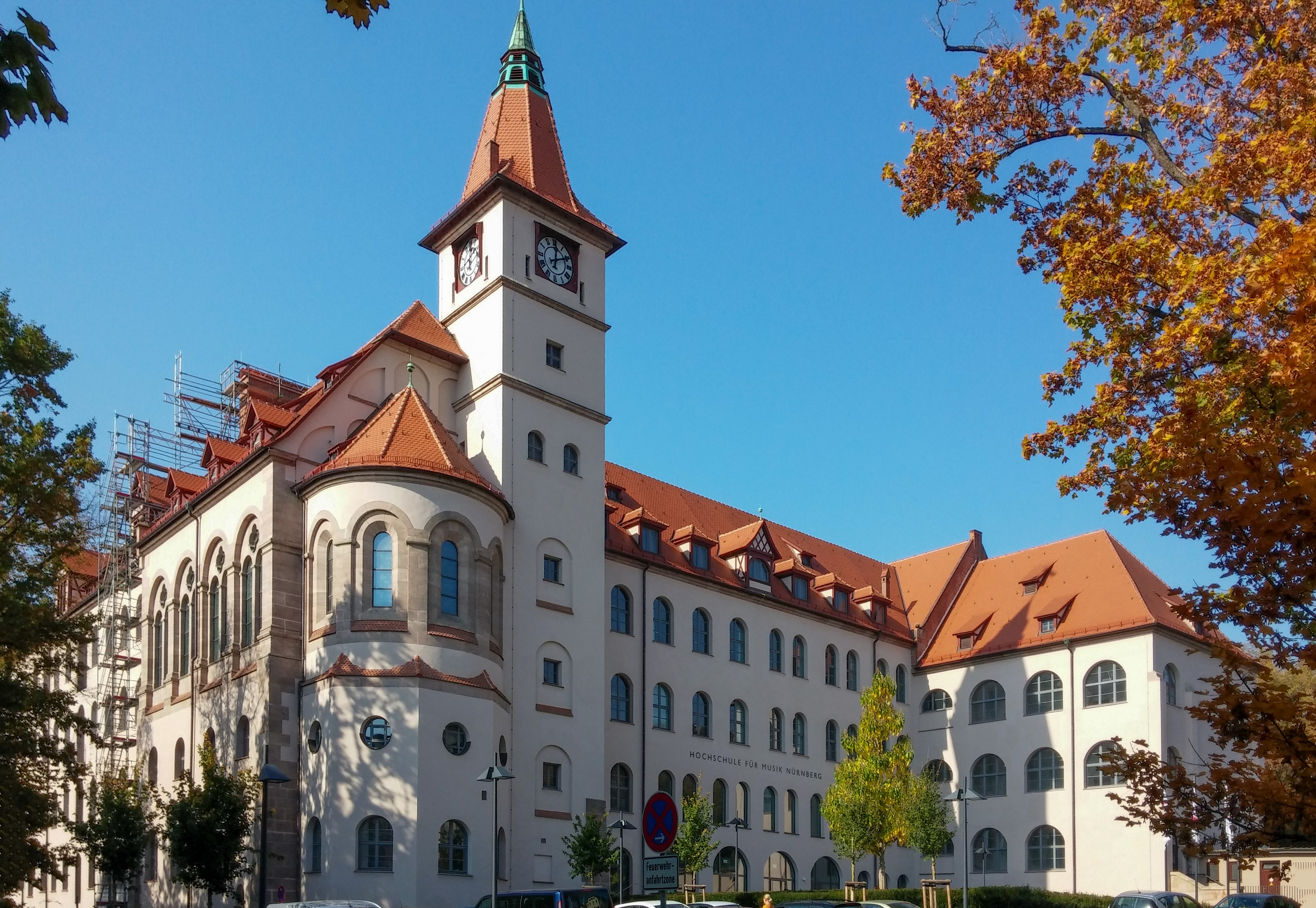
- Type: Public music conservatoire
- Established: 1872; 154 years ago
- Location: Nuremberg, Bavaria, Germany; 49°27′31″N 11°06′31″E
- Website: www.hfm-nuernberg.de
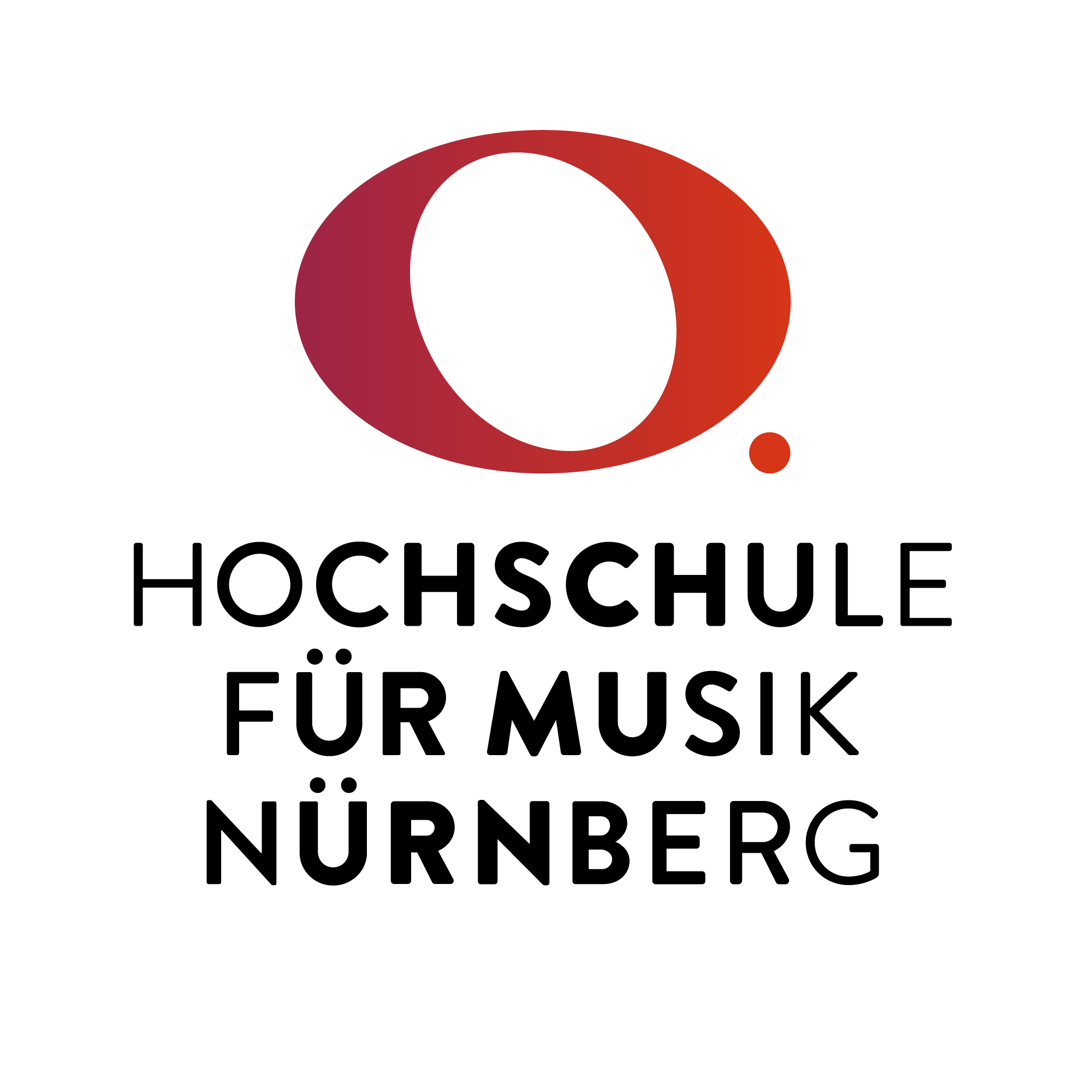

- Location in Germany

The Hochschule für Musik Nürnberg (formerly Hochschule für Musik Nürnberg-Augsburg) is a music conservatoire based in Nuremberg, Bavaria, Germany. The conservatoire has a secondary building in Augsburg.

== The Hochschule ==
The Hochschule für Musik Nürnberg is the result of the merging of the Meistersinger-Konservatorium in Nuremberg and the Leopold-Mozart-Konservatorium in Augsburg in 1998. The Meistersinger-Konservatorium dates back from 1821 when Johannes Scharrer founded the Städtische Singschule, which later became the State Music School (1883) and from 1972 as the "Fachakademie für Musik und Meistersinger-Konservatorium".

== The courses ==
The hochschule offers degrees and postgraduate qualifications in all orchestral instruments, jazz, popular music, singing, opera, music education, conducting and composition.

== Notable alumni and faculty ==
This is a partial list of present and former staff and alumni.

- Werner Andreas Albert (conductor)
- Measha Brueggergosman (singer)
- Willi Domgraf-Fassbaender (singer)
- Werner Egk (composer and conductor)
- Brigitte Fassbaender (singer)
- Aida Garifullina (singer)
- Peter Herbolzheimer (trombonist)
- Karola Obermueller (composer)
- Claus Ogerman (composer)
- Nicolás Pasquet (conductor)
- Hilde Scheppan (soprano)
- Karl Schmitt-Walter (singer)
- Magda Schneider (actress)
- Elisabeth Scholl (soprano)
- Irmgard Seefried (singer)
