= Hermine Galfy =

German soprano (1856–1933)

Hermine Galfy is the stage name of Hermine Katzmayr, married name Hermine Katzmayr-Godeffroy, (25 October 1856 – 2 April 1933) a German operatic soprano and voice teacher.

== Life ==
Hermine Katzmayr was born in Vienna. She was prepared for a singing career at the Vienna Academy of Music by Mathilde Marchesi. She found her first engagement in 1874 in Graz, and moved in 1877 to the Stadttheater Düsseldorf, and to Königsberg in 1879. She joined the Schwerin court theatre in 1880, where she worked successfully until 1887. She appeared there as Eva in the first production of Wagner's Die Meistersinger von Nürnberg at that house in 1882. She was awarded the title Kammersängerin in recognition of her merits.

She appeared as a guest in Bremen, Munich, Stuttgart, Rotterdam, Kassel and Wiesbaden. Galfy took part at the Bayreuth Festival in the 1882 world premiere of Parsifal, as a squire and flower maiden. She enjoyed great recognition everywhere, and retired from the stage in 1894. She took residence in Berlin, where she was active as a vocal teacher at the Klindworth-Scharwenka Conservatory.

Galfy died in Berlin in April 1933 at the age of 76.
