= Marta Fuchs =

German opera singer (1898–1974)

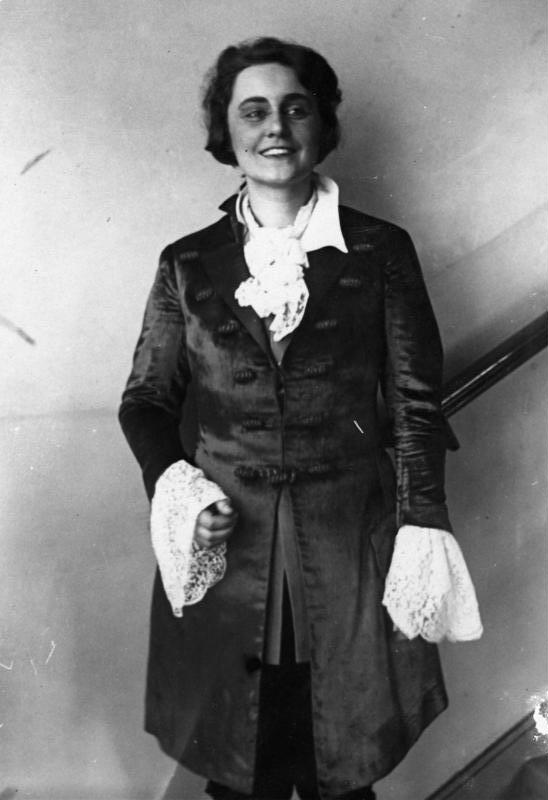
Marta Fuchs in rehearsal for Der Rosenkavalier at the Staatsoper (1937)

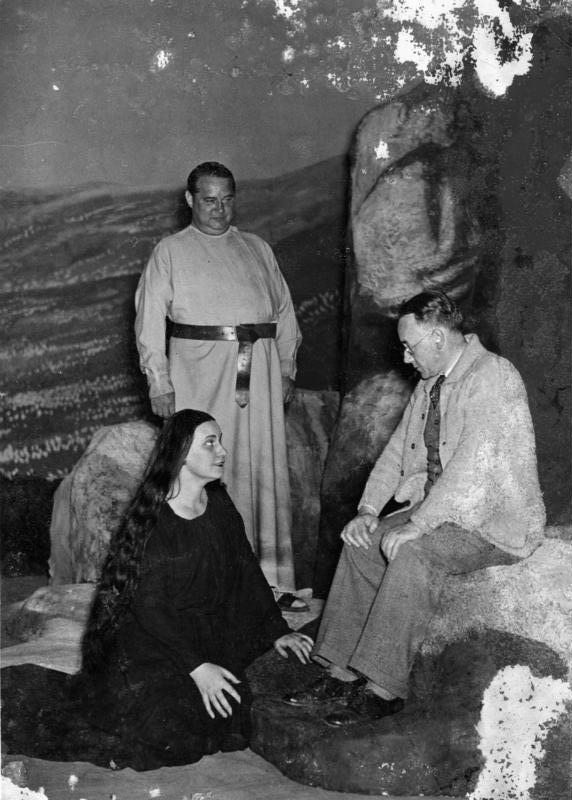
Marta Fuchs with Heinz Tietjen and Ivar Andresen at the Bayreuther Festspielen, 1936

Marta Fuchs (January 1, 1898 - September 22, 1974) was a German concert and operatic dramatic soprano.

Marta Fuchs grew up in an artistic family, her father being a painter, member of the board of the guild and a city councillor. In later years he put his efforts into managing his daughter's career. Marta attended the Königin-Katharina-Stift High School in Stuttgart and studied at the Hochschule für Musik und Darstellende Kunst, the College of Music in Stuttgart. In 1923 at the age of 25, she began her career as a soprano singing concerts and oratories. After undergoing further voice and drama training in Stuttgart, she made her debut as an operatic soprano at the state theatre in Aachen in 1928 with Gluck's Orpheus, Azucena in Verdi's Troubadour and with Carmen.

Marta Fuchs became an active member of the Christian Community and from 1924 a member of the Anthroposophical Society.

In 1930 she was engaged by the Staatsoper in Dresden. After retraining from an alto to a high dramatic soprano, she sang, among other parts, Marschallin, Isolde, Brünnhilde, Arabella, and Fidelio. From 1935 onwards she was also part of the ensemble of the Berlin State Opera und des Deutsche Oper Berlin and appeared as guest in Amsterdam, Prague, Paris, London, Florence and Vienna.

From 1933 to 1942, she was a central figure at the Bayreuther Festspiele, where she played Isolde, Kundry and especially Brünnhilde. On February 20, 1935 she played the part of Maria Tudor in the premiere of Rudolf Wagner-Régeny's Der Günstling.

She remained distant from the National Socialist regime. In 1936, she told Hitler, "Mr Hitler, you are going to make war!" After Hitler's protestation, she replied, "I don't trust you." In May 1939 Hitler greeted her asking, "Now, have I made war?" Fuchs replied, "I still don't trust you!" During the years of National Socialism, using her personal acquaintance with Hitler and Göring, she used her reputation in the petitions to allow the continuation of the anthroposophical work in Germany. On 25 June 1941 she used her influence on behalf of the Christian Community, whose priests had been interned, property confiscated and further work prohibited.

In 1941, she sang Fidelio-Leonore at the Rome Opera.

She gave guest performances at Bayreuth (e.g. Kundry in Parsifal, 1938), Amsterdam, Paris, London, Berlin, Wien and Salzburg.

After a performance of Leoš Janáček’s Jenůfa in 1944, in which she sang the role of Kostelnička, the philosopher Fyodor Stepun wrote to her: “A true and ultimate unity unity between drama and song and through this a true fulfilment of the opera I have to date found realised only in the monumental comedy of the genius Schljapin and in your so completely different priestly, internalised art and if you have accomplished such a successful rendition, the cause lies not least in the fact that your playing moves not in the naturalistic-psychological but rather in the space of mystery-tragedy.” Wilhelm Furtwängler wrote after one of the Isoldes on 3 February 1944 in Berlin: Such a beautiful rendition and such a transfiguration in the death through love he had never experienced…

After the destruction of Dresden on 13 February 1945, she fled to her house on the Tegernsee, then to Stuttgart where she gave guest appearances at the Stuttgart Opera, at conferences of the Christian Community and in 1948 at the conference for Waldorf teachers.

She died in the old-age home in Stuttgart-Sonnenberg on 22 September 1974.
