= Alejandro Marco-Buhrmester =

German operatic baritone

Alejandro Marco-Buhrmester, previously also Alexander Marco-Buhrmester (born 1964) is a German operatic baritone.

== Life ==
Born in Basel, Marco-Buhrmester began studying singing at the Musikschule Konservatorium Bern in 1984 and won the MGB Study Prize for Singing of the City of Zurich from 1985 to 1987.

In 1987, he moved to the opera studio of the City of Basel Music Academy and at the same time received his first engagement at the Theatre Orchestra Biel Solothurn, where he made his debut as Marcello in La Bohème under the direction of Jun Märkl.

This was followed by permanent engagements at the Aalto-Theater Essen (1989-1992) and the Theater Dortmund (1992-1995), where he sang roles such as Papageno, Guglielmo, Jeletzky (alongside Martha Mödl), Danilo, Marcello and Sharpless. In 1995, Harry Kupfer invited him to join the ensemble of the Komische Oper Berlin, where he was a permanent member until 1999 and then sang roles such as Dr. Falke, Harlequin, Dandini and Barber as a guest until 2005. Since 1999, Marco-Buhrmester is a freelance artist.

Since then he has been a guest at the Bielefeld Theatre as Lindorf/Coppélius/Miracle/Dapertutto (the Tales of Hoffmann), Conte di Luna (Il trovatore), Enrico (Lucia di Lammermoor), the title role in Nabucco and Peter Besenbinder (Hänsel and Gretel) and in the musical Kiss Me, Kate as Fred/Petrucchio, as Galileo Galilei in the world premiere of William Wart Murta's Starry Messenger or as Tony in West Side Story. He has also sung at the Saarländisches Staatstheater and Wiesbaden, the Mannheim Theatre, the Bonn Opera, the Deutsche Oper Berlin, the Lucerne International Festival, the Bergen Festival (Norway), the Latvian National Opera in Riga and the Oper Frankfurt].

In 2003, the baritone worked as cover for Thomas Hampson in the role of Germont, which he later took over there himself, for the first time with Daniel Barenboim and Peter Mussbach at the Staatsoper Unter den Linden and was also invited for the 2004/05 season as Kothner in Die Meistersinger von Nürnberg and for a concert (Lyric Symphony by Alexander von Zemlinsky) with the Staatskapelle conducted by Fabio Luisi.

Marco-Buhrmester debuted in Bayreuth in 2001 in Die Meistersinger von Nürnberg, the last production of Wolfgang Wagner under the musical direction of Christian Thielemann. In 2002, he sang there, also under Christian Thielemann, in Tannhäuser, In 2004, he took over the role of Amfortas in Christoph Schlingensief's Parsifal conducted by Pierre Boulez. In 2006, he made his debut in Bayreuth as Gunther in Götterdämmerung, again conducted by Christian Thielemann. He also sang at the Paris Opéra Bastille in 2005 as Melot in Peter Sellars' production of Tristan und Isolde under the direction of Esa-Pekka Salonen and then in the same production as Kurwenal under Valery Gergiev.

Since the 2017/18 season, Marco-Buhrmester has been a permanent member of the Staatstheater Augsburg.

== Repertoire ==
- Giorgio Germont – La traviata
- Miller – Luisa Miller
- Amfortas – Parsifal
- Conte Almaviva – The Marriage of Figaro
- Kurwenal – Tristan und Isolde

== Recordings ==
- Capriccio 2001 (Der Protagonist by Kurt Weill)
- Capriccio 2004 (La celebre Natività del Redentore by Antonio Casimir Cartellieri)
