= Franz Fischer (cellist) =

German conductor and cellist

Franz von Fischer (29 July 1849 – 8 June 1918) was a German cellist and conductor.

== Life ==
Born in Munich, Fischer started piano lessons at the age of nine, but soon turned to the cello. From 1860 he took lessons in harmony at the Munich Conservatory with the solo cellist Hippolyt Müller and Barraga. Already in 1861 he appeared as a cellist for the first time. 1870 Hans Richter engaged him for three years as a solo cellist at the National Theatre in Pest, where he met his later wife Miczi Környei. In 1875 he was placed by Hans Richter in Bayreuth, where Richard Wagner employed him for two years as a solo répétiteur and held him in high esteem, so that already in 1876 he could participate as a choir conductor in the world premiere of his Ring des Nibelungen. In spring 1877, Wagner even took him to London. From November 1877 until 1880, he was Kapellmeister at the Mannheim National Theatre where he made a name for himself especially as a conductor of Wagner's operas, so that in December 1880, he was invited to perform Wagner's recommendation, he was appointed Kapellmeister at the Munich Court Opera, and only two years later was appointed Court Kapellmeister. In the years 1882, 1883, 1884 and 1899 he conducted the performances of Wagner's Parsifal in Bayreuth in alternation with Hermann Levi. (See Bayreuth premiere cast of Parsifal).

In 1888, he conducted the posthumous premiere of his early opera Die Feen, although there was a conflict with the much younger 3rd Kapellmeister Richard Strauss, who had conducted all rehearsals and felt betrayed.

Beside his tireless work as an opera conductor at the court theatre, where he often stood in for colleagues who were unable to attend, he conducted the famous Odeon concerts of the "Musikalische Akademie" for almost 30 years, from 1883 on, all alone from 1888 to 1892, otherwise mostly the big choir concerts. As a highlight of his career, Fischer conducted the festive concert for the 100th anniversary of the "Musikalische Akademie" on 6 December 1911 with Beethoven's Symphony No. 9.

Fischer died in Munich at the age of 68.
