= Ulrike Helzel =

German mezzo-soprano

Ulrike Helzel is a German operatic mezzo-soprano.

== Life ==
Helzel was born in Magdeburg. She received her vocal training from 1988 onwards with Christa Kern-Pöschel at the University of Music and Theatre Leipzig. In 1990, she was awarded second prize at the International Antonín-Dvořák Competition in Karlovy Vary/Karlsbad. In 1992, she was a scholarship holder of the Richard Wagner Scholarship Foundation. Already during her studies she sang in Halle and Leipzig. she was engaged at the Opernhaus Halle. She also performed at the Handel Festival, Halle. She received the Händel-Förderpreis der Stadt Halle in 1995. From 1996 to 2012, she worked at the Deutsche Oper Berlin. Her roles there included "Orpheus" in Gluck's Orfeo ed Euridice, "Cherubino" in Mozart's Le nozze di Figaro, "Hänsel" in Humperdinck's Hänsel und Gretel,"Octavian" in Strauss’ Der Rosenkavalier and "Fuchs" in Janáček's The Cunning Little Vixen. She also sang Mary Magdalene de' Pazzi in contemporary music theatre Infinito nero by Salvatore Sciarrino.

In 2011 she made her debut at the Vienna State Opera, where she became an ensemble member in 2012. Among other, she sang there as Annina in Strauss' Der Rosenkavalier, as Wellgundein Wagner's Götterdämmerung, as "Elfe" in Dvořáks's Rusalka, as "Jenny" in Weill's Rise and Fall of the City of Mahagonny as "Marcellina" in Mozart's The marriage of Figaro. She also took part in the children's opera Pollicino by Hans Werner Henze. Guest appearances have taken her to De Nationale Opera in Amsterdam, the Theater Basel, the Komische Oper Berlin, the Théâtre Royal de la Monnaie, the Semperoper, the Grand Théâtre de Genève, the Opernhaus Graz, the Hamburgische Staatsoper, the Cologne Opera, the Leipzig Opera, the Opéra National de Lyon and the Bayerische Staatsoper in Munich. She also performed at the Dresden Music Festival and the Lucerne Festival. From 2006 to 2012, she was regularly engaged at the Bayreuth Festival. There she was "Wellgunde" in Der Ring des Nibelungen as well as the Second Squire and the Flower Girl in Parsifal (from 2008).

Concert tours as a concert singer have taken her to the USA and Japan, working with conductors such as Marek Janowski, Jiří Kout, Helmuth Rilling, Peter Schreier, Christian Thielemann, Marcello Viotti and Lothar Zagrosek. She interprets songs among others by Brahms, Mussorgsky and Zemlinsky.
