= Herbert Janssen =

German opera singer

External audio
- Shellac recordings with Herbert Janssen the Online Archive of the Österreichische Mediathek

Herbert Janssen (22 September 1892 – 3 June 1965) was a leading German operatic baritone of the 20th century who had a career in Europe and the United States.

== Biography ==
Janssen was born in Cologne, the son of a wealthy coal merchant of Swedish origin. He claimed to be related to the painter Victor Emil Janssen and the writer Werner Hasenclever. After serving as an officer in the German army between 1914 and 1918, Janssen initially took up studying law in Berlin. He then took vocal instruction from Oscar Daniel and made his debut at the Berlin State Opera on 5 May 1922 in Schreker's Schatzgräber, and became a member of the regular opera company there. Initially focusing on Italian roles in Berlin, he began expanding into Wagnerian roles during the 1923–1924 season in Berlin, singing Wolfram in Richard Wagner's Tannhäuser. In 1925 he made a career breakthrough, again singing Wolfram, this time at the Waldoper in Zoppot (now Sopot, Poland). Between 1925 and 1937, Janssen centered his career on Berlin, Zoppot, the Bayreuth Festival, and the annual grand opera season at the Royal Opera House in Covent Garden, London, adding to these regular appearances a number of guest performances at the Vienna State Opera, the Opera Garnier in Paris (1931–1934), La Monnaie in Brussels (1934, 1935), and Dresden, Munich, The Hague (1929), and Barcelona (1928, 1929).

Janssen reportedly disliked the Nazi regime that took power in Germany in 1933. In 1937 he fell foul of the regime, and was warned he should leave the country immediately. Initially travelling with his wife Erna to Britain, where he was found temporary accommodation by Walter Legge and Legge's sister, the Janssens then settled temporarily in Vienna where Janssen sang with the State Opera in the 1937 and 1938 seasons. Despite successes - "the audience idolises me and the newspapers are full of the highest praise" - Janssen recognised he had no long-term future in Austria, and began reaching out to connections in the United States. Narrowly escaping Austria in March 1938 ahead of the Anschluss, he temporarily settled in France, from where he visited South America to give some performances in Buenos Aires, before eventually emigrating to the United States.

Once in the United States, Janssen became a member of the Metropolitan Opera company, first appearing with them at the beginning of 1939 on their tour of Philadelphia; he would sing with the company until 1952. At this point he also began to change his repertory. Up to this time Janssen had been known for his brilliant high range more than for his abilities as a heroic baritone, and had focused his attention on the more lyrical Wagnerian roles such as Wolfram. In Buenos Aires in 1938, as an experiment he sang his first a heavier and more demanding bass-baritone role, that of the Wanderer in Siegfried. Now in Philadelphia, he performed this role again, the first of many performances of heavy bass-baritone roles he would sing with the company. Though he continued to sing his old roles, as well as occasional roles such as Don Fernando in Beethoven's Fidelio, Jochanaan in Strauss's Salome and The Speaker in Mozart's Die Zauberflöte, a shortage of suitable singers also pressured him into singing those heavier bass-baritone Wagner parts to which his voice was less well suited: for example Hans Sachs in Die Meistersinger von Nürnberg and Wotan/the Wanderer in Der Ring des Nibelungen. It was difficult for him to handle the low tessitura of these roles, forcing him to use resources of power that strained his voice. In 1943 he succeeded Friedrich Schorr at the Met as the first heroic bass-baritone of the house; this meant the majority of Janssen's Metropolitan performances would now be of these heavy roles, to the greater detriment of his voice. By the end of the 1940s he was becoming more conspicuous for being indisposed or having to cancel appearances than he was for his formerly brilliant virtuosity. Around 1950 he abandoned the heavy heroic roles, returning to his former showpiece roles of Telramund, Holländer and Amfortas. Janssen made his final appearance with the Metropolitan Opera as Kothner on 25 April 1952, during the company's spring tour in Boston.

From 1940 onwards Janssen also sang regularly at Buenos Aires and with the San Francisco Opera between 1945 and 1951. His final guest appearances in Europe as Amonasro, Jochanaan, Kurwenal and Orest were made at the Vienna Staatsoper in June 1950. He began teaching a small number of singing pupils in New York City from 1939 onwards, including (from 1941) an acquaintance from his time at Bayreuth, Friedelind Wagner (granddaughter of Richard Wagner), who like Janssen had fled the Nazi regime. Janssen and his wife Erna had acquired US citizenship in 1946/1947, and following his retirement from the Metropolitan Opera they remained in New York City, where Janssen continued to work as a singing teacher and where he died.

== Repertory ==
Originally, Janssen sang an extensive repertory. He appeared in Mozart roles such as the Count in Le nozze di Figaro and as Lortzing's Zar Peter in Zar und Zimmermann. He also sang major baritone roles of Giuseppe Verdi, including Conte di Luna in Il trovatore as well as Renato in Un ballo in maschera and Iago in Otello. He also performed Escamillo in Bizet's Carmen.

At the Metropolitan Opera, Janssen was cast overwhelmingly in Wagnerian roles. He was known for his interpretations of Kurwenal in Tristan und Isolde, Amfortas (in Parsifal) and Wolfram in Tannhäuser. Of his singing, his colleague Astrid Varnay would say, "whenever he was allowed to sing one of the truly lyrical baritone roles in the Wagner repertoire, there was nobody better. His meltingly lovely song to the evening star in the third act of Tannhauser could steal the show almost completely from any tenor but [Lauritz] Melchior."

Janssen made commercial gramophone records of some of his roles. There is a recording derived from the 1930 Bayreuth Festival with him performing Wolfram's music, while he sang the role of Don Pisarro in a 1944 radio broadcast of Beethoven's Fidelio with Arturo Toscanini conducting. These recordings have all been re-issued on CD.
