= Max Mikorey =

German tenor

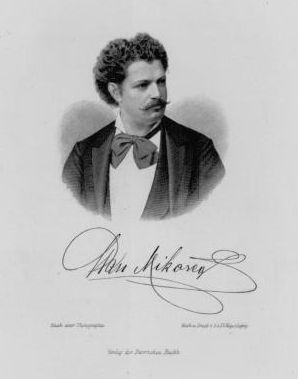
Max Mikorey, steel engraving by August Weger (1823–1892)

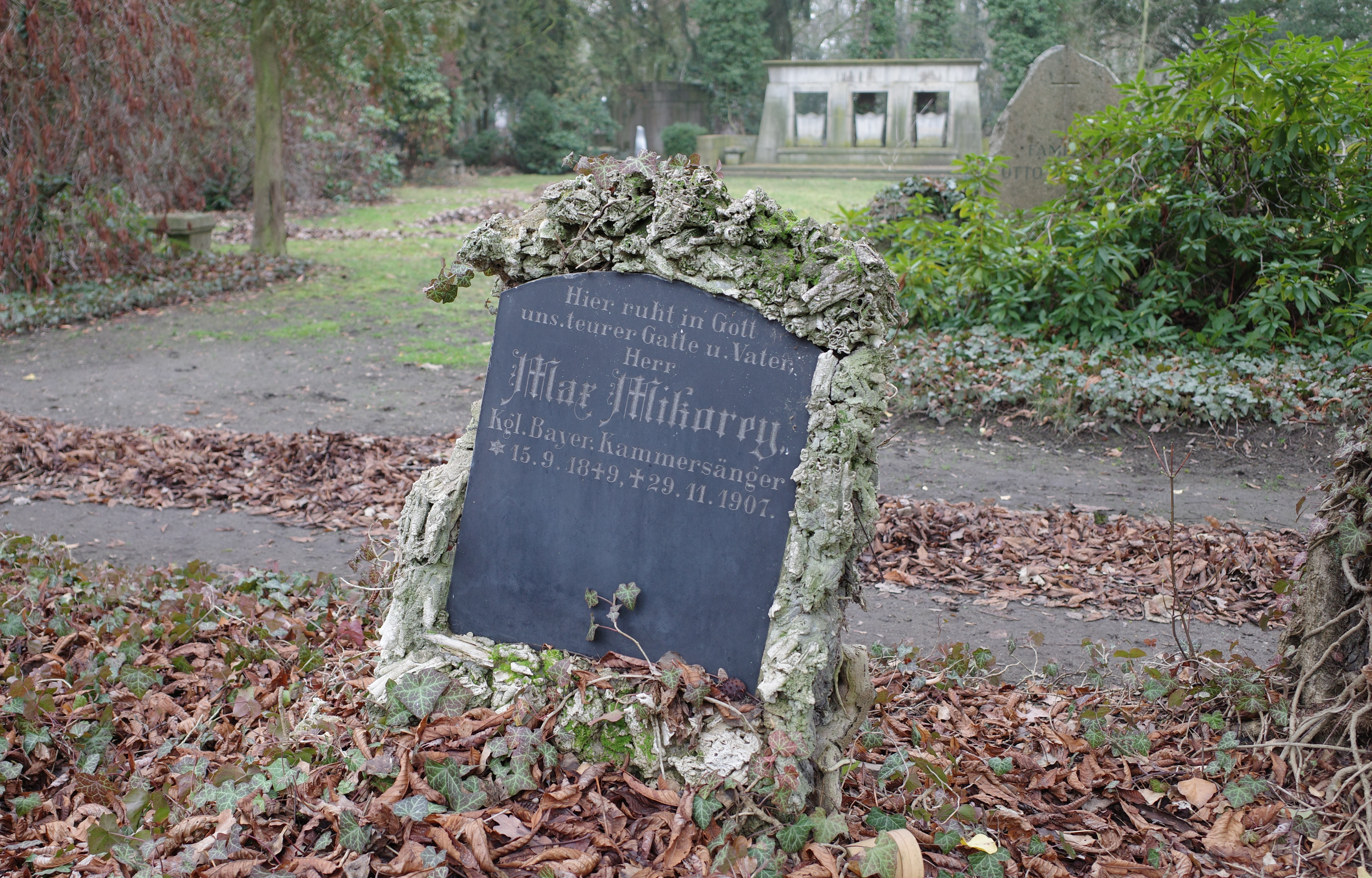
Gravestone in Dessau

Max Mikorey (15 September 1850 – 1 December 1907) was a German operatic tenor.

== Life ==
Born in Weihmichl, Kingdom of Bavaria, Mikorey was the son of an economist. After he returned home from the Franco-Prussian War, he took singing lessons with Heinrich Vogl for a short time and then devoted himself to the stage career. He began at the Stadttheater in Zurich, then came to the Staatstheater am Gärtnerplatz in Munich, and in 1878 to the Hoftheater of the same city. In the beginning, he was used in unimportant tasks and immediately ventured into the field of the Heldentenor as Raoul. In 1882 he also got a small role in the Bayreuth premiere cast of Parsifal as a squire. Mikorey was awarded the title of Kammersänger for his outstanding services. Some of his most recognized achievements are Arnold, Lyonel, Stradella, Erik, Hüon, Walther von Stolzing, Tannhäuser, Don José, Manrico etc. In 1888 he sang Arindal in the posthumous premiere of Wagner's early work Die Feen.

Mikorey died in 1907 in Dessau at the age of 57.
