= Simone Schröder =

German contralto

- Born: 1964 (age 60–61); Altdöbern, West Germany
- Education: Hochschule für Musik Hanns Eisler; Hochschule für Musik Carl Maria von Weber
- Occupations: Operatic contralto; Academic teacher
- Organizations: Bayreuth Festival; Fachhochschule Lausitz

Simone Schröder (born 1964) is a German contralto in opera and concert, and an academic teacher. She has been associated with the Bayreuth Festival from her student days in 1992, performing in three different productions of Parsifal. She has appeared regularly at the Staatsoper Berlin and the Semperoper, and appeared as a guest at opera houses including La Scala in Milan, New National Theatre Tokyo and Teatro Colón in Buenos Aires.

== Life and career ==
Born in Altdöbern, Schröder completed her vocal training at the Hochschule für Musik Hanns Eisler in Berlin as well as with Elsbeth Plehn at the Hochschule für Musik Carl Maria von Weber in Dresden, and with Irmgard Hartmann-Dressler in Berlin. She won prizes of singing competitions, including the Franceso Vinas Competition in Barcelona and the Salzburg International Mozart Competition.

She sang at the Staatsoper Berlin first in the 1997/98 season, as the Page in Salome by Richard Strauss, conducted by Daniel Barenboim. As a regular guest singer there, she appeared as Mrs. Quickly in Verdi's Falstaff and Suzuki in Puccini's Madama Butterfly, among others. In April 2013, she took over the role of Mary in Wagner's Der fliegende Holländer at the Berlin State Opera under the musical direction of Daniel Harding.

Schröder's association with the Bayreuth Festival began already during her student years when she appeared as the Third Boy in Tannhäuser from 1992. In 1996, she performed as one of the Flower Maidens in Parsifal. She went on to appear in the Ring Erda, Grimgerde, Schweitleite and the First Norn, and more small roles in three Bayreuth productions of Parsifal, in 1999 by Wolfgang Wagner, in 2004 by Christoph Schlingensief and conducted by Pierre Boulez, and in 2008 by Stefan Herheim and conducted by Daniele Gatti.

Schröder appeared as a guest at La Scala in Milan, the Washington National Opera, the Oper Leipzig, the Deutsche Oper Berlin, to Japan, Singapore and Denmark as well as to the Canary Islands Music Festival, among others. The conductor Dan Ettinger engaged her as Erda for his Ring cycle at the New National Theatre Tokyo (2008/09) and for Das Rheingold at the Nationaltheater Mannheim (2011/12). In 2012/13, she made her role debut as Fricka in the Ring des Nibelungen at the Teatro Colón in Buenos Aires conducted by Roberto Paternostro. At the Semperoper in Dresden, she performed as Wigelis in Feuersnot by Richard Strauss in June 2014, with Stefan Klingele conducting.

Schröder has worked with conductors including Michael Boder, Ivor Bolton, Christoph Eschenbach, Ádám Fischer, Michael Gielen, Fabio Luisi, Kent Nagano, Giuseppe Sinopoli and Christian Thielemann.

In concert, she has performed in choral-orchestral works and in concert performances of operas, in a repertoire including Bach's oratorios, Verdi's Requiem and major works from the early 20th century.

Schröder taught voice at the Cottbus Conservatory from 1988. Since 2001, she has been professor for voice at the Fachhochschule Lausitz, where she lectured from 1995.

== Recordings ==
- Mahler: Symphony No. 8. Alto solo and Mater Aegyptica, conductor: Pierre Boulez (Deutsche Grammophon 2007)
- Schumann: Der Königssohn and Mendelssohn: Die erste Walpurgisnacht, Bayerisches Staatsorchester, conductor: Kent Nagano (FARAO 2010)
- Wagner: Der fliegende Holländer (first Paris version of 1841): Terje Stensvold (Holländer), Astrid Weber (Senta), Franz-Josef Selig (Donald), Jörg Dürmüller (Georg), Simone Schröder (Mary), Kobie van Rensburg (Steuermann), WDR Rundfunkchor Köln, Prague Chamber Choir, Cappella Coloniensis, conductor: Bruno Weil (DHM 2004)
