= Lore Wissmann =

German operatic singer

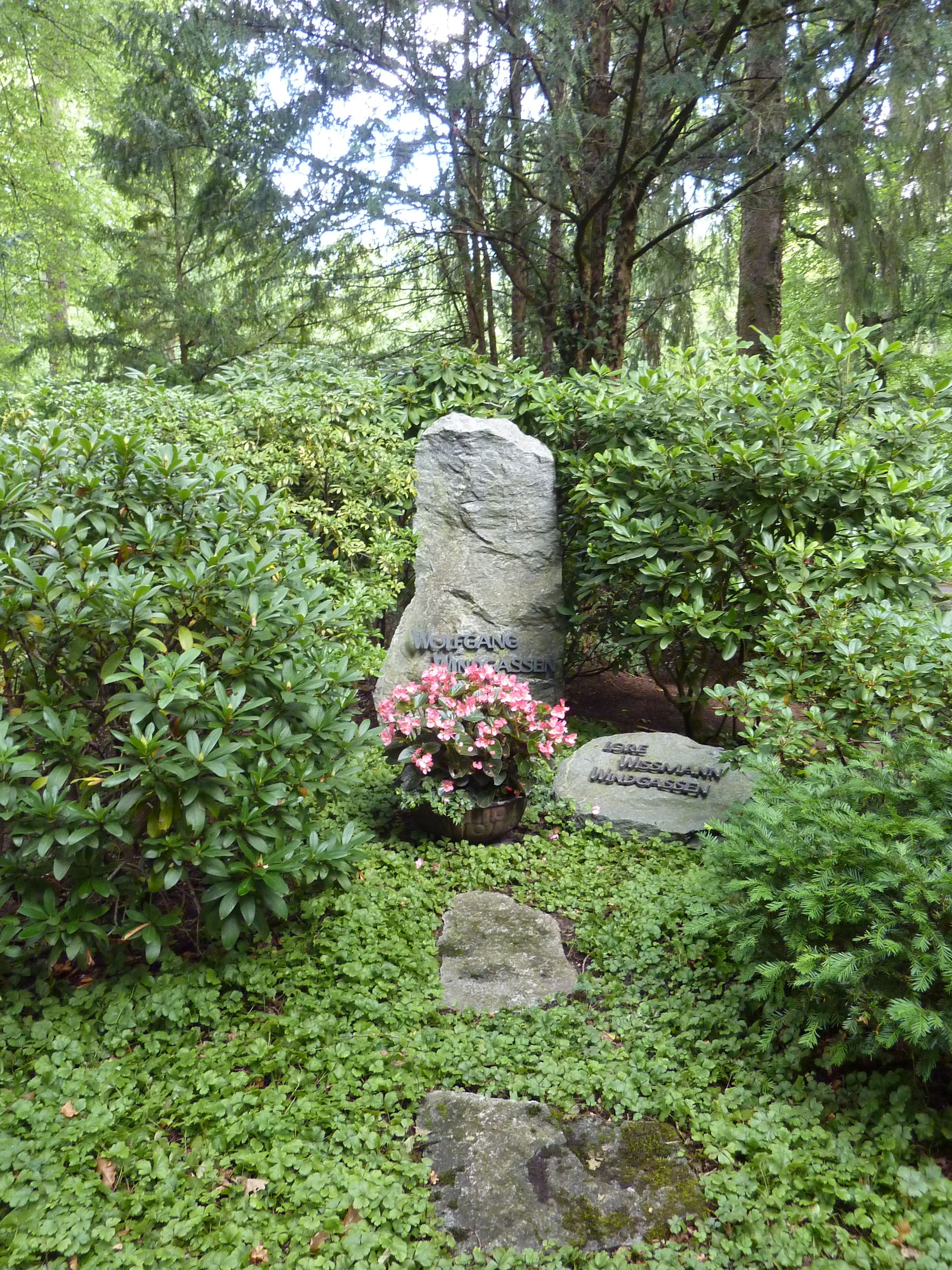
Grave of Lore Wissmann and Wolfgang Windgassen in the Stuttgart Waldfriedhof

Lore Wissmann (22 June 1922 – 25 December 2007) was a German operatic soprano.

== Life ==
Wissmann was born in Neckartailfingen. After studying at the State University of Music and Performing Arts Stuttgart, Wissmann made her debut in 1942 at the State Opera there, of which she was a member for over thirty years.

There, she sang all the important lyrical parts, including Minnie in La fanciulla del West, Liù in Turandot, Marie in The Bartered Bride as well as Manon in Manon Lescaut and also took part in numerous premieres and first performances, among others by Hindemith, Stravinsky and Orff.

She gave guest performances at all leading opera houses in Europe. At the Bayreuth premiere cast of Parsifal, she sang parts from Das Rheingold and Eva in Die Meistersinger von Nürnberg (1956). She was married with the tenor Wolfgang Windgassen (1914–1974).

Wissmann died in Uffing am Staffelsee at the age of 85. She rests beside her husband Wolfgang Windgassen at the Waldfriedhof Stuttgart.
