= Henry Alf =

Norwegian opera singer (1891–1963)

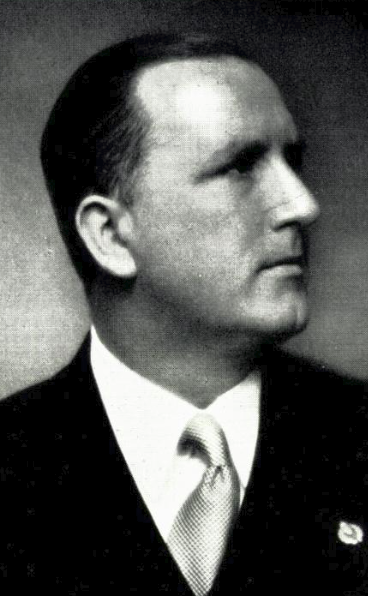
- Born: April 10, 1891; Oslo, Norway
- Died: January 22, 1963 (aged 71); Oslo, Norway
- Occupation: Opera singer
- Family: Ivar F. Andresen (brother)

Alf Henry Andresen (April 10, 1891, Oslo, Norway – January 7, 1963, Oslo, Norway) was a Norwegian opera singer who used the stage name Henry Alf.

== Biography ==
He made his debut in the University Aula in the 1920s and was head of the Norwegian Opera Singers' Association a couple of times in the 1930s. He performed at the capital's theater stages, such as Opera Comique (Oslo), which was active in 1918–1921. Later he was at the National Theatre, for example in Aida, where he was "King of Egypt" in 1931. He was also involved in Germany.

He was the son of Anton Olaf Andresen (1863–1926) and Nilsine Trondsen (1870–1959). His father ran a manufactory in Kristiania. He was the brother of opera singer Ivar F. Andresen (1896–1940), while his sister Ingeborg Andresen (1904–92) was the mother of Thorvald Stoltenberg.
