= Total wartime deployment of the cultural workers =

The Total wartime deployment of the cultural workers (Totaler Kriegseinsatz der Kulturschaffenden), popularly known as Theatersperre, was a decree by Joseph Goebbels in his function as Reichsbevollmächtiger für den totalen Kriegseinsatz of 24 August 1944, which came into force on 1 September 1944. This resulted in the closure of almost all German and Austrian theaters and cultural institutions.

Artists who were not on the so-called Gottbegnadeten list were also called upon to important war activities. The singer Anneliese Rothenberger, for example, had to work in a tinplate can factory after the closure of the Theater Koblenz.

== Historical processing ==
The theatre closure has hardly been historically reconstructed so far:

As about many subranges [...], so also about the total wartime deployment of the creative artists only few facts circulate in the secondary literature. The "Total Wartime Commitment of the Creative Cultural Workers" was neither announced by a Reichsgesetz, nor by a Führer order published in the Reichsgesetzblatt, nor by one of the numerous Führer decrees not announced in the Reichsgesetzblatt.

— Philipp Stein, Studien zur Wiener Konzerthausgesellschaft und den Nationalsozialisten

== Austria ==
Already on 8 March 1943, Hitler ordered: "The Bayreuth Festival will take place on the same scale as last year. The Salzburg Festival will not take place. Instead, Salzburg Theatre Weeks are to be organized, in which the armament workers and wounded persons present in the Salzburg area are to take part in the performances." After the 20 July plot, the Salzburg Theatre and Music Summer was cancelled nine days later due to an order by Joseph Goebbels. The conductor Clemens Krauss, however, succeeded in leading the planned premiere of Richard Strauss' Die Liebe der Danae up to a Public Dress Rehearsal in front of invited guests and to push through a total of three concerts.

The Salzburger Nachrichten reported on August 25 of Goebbels' "measures for total warfare" and wrote explicitly: "All theatres, variety theatres, cabarets and drama schools are to be closed until September 1, 1944.

According to the files of the Reich Chamber of Culture and the Wiener Stadt- und Landesarchiv, each cultural institution in Vienna was served its own decommissioning order. For the Vienna Symphony and the Vienna Volksoper there was a decommissioning order. Not affected were the Konzerthaus, Vienna and the Vienna Philharmonic. These could perform under the direction of Karl Böhm in the years 1944/45 in the Vienna Konzerthaus. Elisabeth Höngen, accompanied by Peter Graef at the piano, sang in the unheated Mozartsaal on Liederabend works by Franz Schubert. The Simpl (Wien) benefited from its air-raid shelter and was allowed to keep the business running, while all cultural institutions, with the exception of the Berlin Philharmonic, had to close their doors in the German-speaking countries.

== Literature ==
- Ilija Dürhammer, Pia Janke: Die "österreichische" nationalsozialistische Ästhetik. Böhlau 2003, ISBN 3-205-77151-6.
- Philipp Stein: Studien zur Wiener Konzerthausgesellschaft und den Nationalsozialisten. 2006, Grin Verlag.
- Elisabeth Th. Fritz-Hilscher, Helmut Kretschmer: Wien Musikgeschichte: Von der Prähistorie bis zur Gegenwart. Lit Verlag 2011, ISBN 3-643-50368-7.
- Maximilian Haas: [...] alle anderen waren schon geflohen, und die haben noch fleißig musiziert. Der "kulturelle Kriegshilfsdienst" in Wien. Dipl. Vienna 2013.
- Maximilian Haas: Die Gottbegnadeten-Liste (BArch R 55/20252a), in Juri Giannini, Maximilian Haas und Erwin Strouhal (ed.): Eine Institution zwischen Repräsentation und Macht. Die Universität für Musik und darstellende Kunst Wien im Kulturleben des Nationalsozialismus. Mille Tre Verlag, Vienna 2014, pp. 239–276, ISBN 978-3-900198-36-7 ("Musikkontext 7").

== Sources ==
- U. Bahnsen, K. von Stühner: Franz Liszt riss die Hamburger mit, in the Hamburger Abendblatt, 18 November 2003.
