= Tansel Akzeybek =

German operatic tenor

Tansel Akzeybek (born 1978) is a German operatic tenor of Turkish descent.

== Life ==
Akzeybek was born in 1978 in Berlin. When he was five years old, he returned with his family to their home town İzmir. Akzeybek did not speak Turkish at the time and therefore had to practise with his grandmother in order to join the school. Until he was 14 years old, Akzeybek played in the youth team of the Altay S.K. After his parents recognised his talent as a singer, Akzeybek received singing lessons at a private music school and his father also gave him a keyboard. At the age of 15 Akzeybek became a wedding singer. Akzeybek passed the entrance examination at the state Dokuz Eylül University of İzmir with the maximum score and started to study singing there. During this time Akzeybek also performed in the army music corps during state visits. At the age of 18 he attended an opera performance for the first time with Jules Massenet's Werther. At 19, Akzeybek became a member of the opera choir and in 1998 he sang his first solo in Beethoven's Fidelio as the First Prisoner. After completing his studies, Akzeybek was engaged at the opera in İzmir. As he saw few further opportunities for development for himself in his home country, Akzeybek said, because there was no independent opera tradition there, he followed the advice of a horn player friend who occasionally worked with the Berlin Philharmonic Orchestra and moved from İzmir to Lübeck in 2004, even though he said he no longer spoke a word of German. In Germany, Akzeybek studied for three more semesters at the Lübeck Musikhochschule with Anke Eggers and, after graduating, in master classes with Lia Lantieri, Katia Ricciarelli and René Kollo. In 2009, he received a scholarship from the Richard Wagner Association in Bayreuth, followed by engagements in Dortmund, Bonn, Salzburg and finally Berlin, where he was a member of the ensemble of the Komische Oper Berlin. He played Tamino in The Magic Flute and Tony in West Side Story.

Akzeybek holds German citizenship since 2013. From 2014, Akzeybek returned to İzmir for a short time, where he sang the title role in the 2015 premiere of a Harry Potter opera staged by Murat Göksu at the Mozart Academy. Am 25. Juli 2015 eröffnete Akzeybek in seiner Rolle eines jungen Seemanns in Tristan und Isolde.
