= Walther Ludwig =

German opera singer

External audio
- Shellac recordings with Walther Ludwig in the Online Archive of the Österreichische Mediathek

Walther Ludwig (17 March 1902 – 15 May 1981) was a German operatic lyric tenor, particularly associated with Mozart roles and Schubert lieder.

== Biography ==
Ludwig was born on 17 March 1902 in Bad Oeynhausen.

He first studied medicine in Freiburg before turning to voice studies in Königsberg, where he made his debut in 1928. He then sang in Schwerin, where he created the title role in Paul Graeners's Friedmann Bach in 1931. He joined the Städtische Oper Berlin in 1932, where he established himself in Mozart roles such as Belmonte, Don Ottavio, Tamino, Idomeneo, and Ferrando. After the war, he began appearing at the Hamburg State Opera, and made his debut at the Vienna State Opera in 1947 and at the Salzburg Festival in 1948.

He also made guest appearances at La Scala in Milan, the Paris Opéra, the Royal Opera House in London, the Liceo in Barcelona.

A stylish and musical lyric tenor, other notable roles included light Italian roles such as Nemorino, Ernesto, Duke of Mantua, Alfredo, French lyric role such as Wilhelm Meister. He left complete recordings of Die Entführung aus dem Serail, Die Zauberflöte, Die lustigen Weiber von Windsor, Zar und Zimmermann, Die schöne Müllerin, Die Schöpfung, and a very Germanic sounding Verdi Requiem. He was the Evangelist in a live 1950 Vienna performance of Bach's Matthew Passion under Karajan, in which Kathleen Ferrier sang, now available on CD.

Ludwig taught in Berlin from 1952 until 1969. He died on 15 May 1981 in Lahr, Germany.

== Selected filmography ==
- I by Day, You by Night (1932)
- Count Woronzeff (1934)
- Maria Ilona (1939)
- The Way to Freedom (1941)

== Sources ==
- Biography on Operissimo.com (in German)
