= Karl Schmitt-Walter =

German opera singer

External audio
- Recordings with Karl Schmitt-Walter in the Online Archive of the Österreichische Mediathek

Karl Schmitt-Walter (23 December 1900 – 14 January 1985) was a prominent German opera singer, particularly associated with Mozart and the more lyrical Wagner baritone roles.

== Life and career ==
Schmitt-Walter was born in Germersheim. He studied at the Nuremberg Conservatory with Gustav Landauer, and made his debut there in 1921. He subsequently appeared at provincial opera houses in Oberhausen, Saarbrücken, Dortmund and Wiesbaden, building a reputation for vocal excellence as he went along. Schmitt-Walter made his key debut at the Berlin State Opera in 1935, as Luna in Il trovatore, which led to a long association with this important theatre, where he would sing wide repertory of lyric parts for the baritone voice. He also performed often at the Hamburg State Opera, the Vienna State Opera, the Salzburg Festival, the Bayreuth Festival, and, from 1950, the Munich State Opera.

Outside the Austro-German operatic heartland, he made guest appearances at the Paris Opéra, the Royal Opera House, Covent Garden, in London, the Liceo in Barcelona, La Monnaie in Brussels and the Holland Festival, among other major European venues.

Schmitt-Walter possessed a comparatively light, high-baritone voice of great beauty and was equipped with an exceptionally good singing technique. He was particularly admired in Mozart and Wagner roles, notably Papageno, Wolfram von Eschenbach, and Beckmesser, which role he often sang at Bayreuth. Schmitt-Walter also performed in Verdi operas such as Ernani, La traviata and Un ballo in maschera, mostly in German translation. He enjoyed considerable success in light German operas by Lortzing and also in operetta. He was an excellent lieder interpreter, too. In 1957 he was appointed professor at the State Music University in Munich. He was awarded the Grand Cross of Merit for the Federal Republic of Germany and the Bavarian Order of Merit. The king of Denmark awarded him the Order of Merit (Dannebrogorden).

From 1962, Schmitt-Walter taught in Munich and Copenhagen. He died in Bavaria at the age of 84.

== Selected recordings ==
- Die Meistersinger von Nürnberg, Bayreuth 1960, conducted by Hans Knappertsbusch.
- Die Zauberflöte, Salzburg, 1949, conducted by Wilhelm Furtwängler.

== Selected filmography ==
- Six Days of Leave (1941)
- Whom the Gods Love (1942)

== Sources ==
- Operissimo.com
- schmitt-walter.de
