= Norbert Ernst =

Austrian operatic tenor (born 1977)

Norbert Ernst (born 21 November 1977) is an Austrian operatic tenor.

== Life ==
Ernst was born in Vienna and grew up in Edlitz. Later he studied instrumental and vocal pedagogy and the concert singing at the J. M. Hauer Conservatory in Wiener Neustadt with Gerd Fussi. He studied song and oratorio with Charles Spencer and Robert Holl at the University of Music and Performing Arts in Vienna and attended master classes with Kurt Equiluz and Walter Berry.

As a concert singer Ernst performed in Austria, Hungary, Italy, Switzerland, Germany and the Netherlands in the Royal Concertgebouw (Amsterdam) and in Utrecht.

His first engagement took Ernst to the Deutsche Oper am Rhein in Düsseldorf in 2002 as a member of the ensemble, where he made his debut as David in Die Meistersinger von Nürnberg. He also sang this role at the Savonlinna Opera Festival. Guest appearances have taken the tenor to the Volksoper Wien, the Stadttheater Klagenfurt, the Grand Théâtre de Genève, the Staatsoper unter den Linden Berlin and as Telemaco in Il ritorno d'Ulisse in patria to the opera festival in Montreux.

In autumn 2003, Ernst made his debut as Brighella under the conduct of Pinchas Steinberg at the Opera National de Paris. In summer 2004, he made his debut at the Bayreuth Festival as the 3rd Squire in Parsifal under the conduct of Pierre Boulez. Further invitations followed for 2005 and 2006 again as 3rd Squire and helmsman in The Flying Dutchman and in 2007 as David in Die Meistersinger von Nürnberg, Sebastian Weigle conducting, under whom he also made his debut as helmsman at the Liceu in Barcelona in 2007.

The highlight of his career so far, however, was his debut at the Vienna State Opera in January 2008, where he stepped in at short notice as David in the revival of Die Meistersinger von Nürnberg under the direction of Christian Thielemann and received much applause from audience and press. Since the 2010/11 season, Ernst has been a member of the Vienna State Opera.

At the Salzburg Festival in 2012 he performed in a Mozart Matinee, and in 2015 he played the role of Jaquino in the new production of Beethoven's Fidelio.

== Recordings ==
- 2013: Wohl fühl ich, wie das Leben rinnt, Kristen Okerlund, piano; Gramola
- 2016: Lebt Kein Gott – Arien von Beethoven, Weber und Wagner (Decca Records)
