= Tomislav Mužek =

Croatian tenor and opera singer

Tomislav Mužek is a Croatian tenor and opera singer.

He studied in Vienna at the University of Music and Performing Arts and made his professional debut at the Vienna State Opera in 1999.

Was an ensemblemember of the Bremen Stadttheater from 2000 to 2002, where he sang such roles as: Don Ottavio, Ferrando, Tamino, Alfredo, Rodolfo. Now he is performing as a freelancer singing major lyric tenor parts in opera houses as: Teatro alla Scala Milan, Opéra Bastille Paris, Théâtre du Capitole Toulouse, Bayerische Staatsoper Munich, Bayreuther Festspiele, Semperoper Dresden, Opernhaus Zürich. He is represented by the Hilbert Artists Management GmBH agency.
