= Heinz Tietjen =

German conductor and music producer

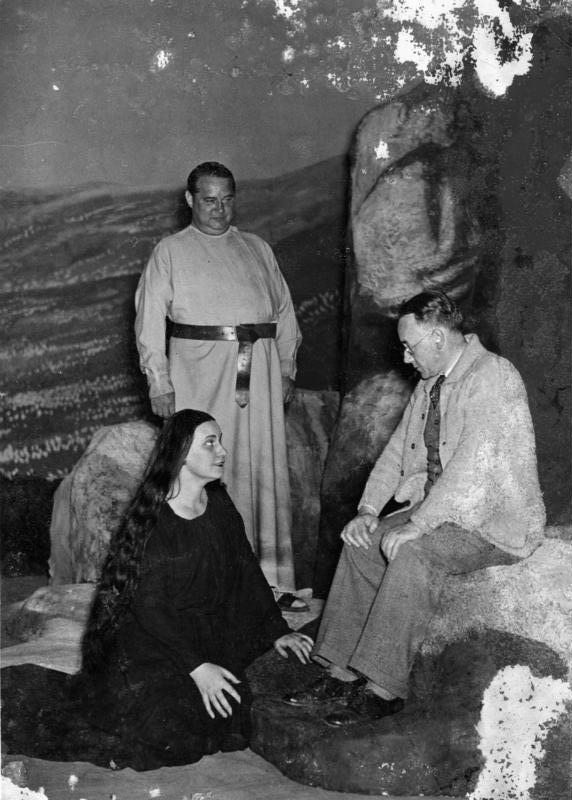
Bayreuth Festival 1936 Tietjen at a meeting with Marta Fuchs (Kundry) and Ivar F. Andresen (Gurnemanz) at the rehearsal for Parsifal. Photo: Naumann 9919-36

Heinz Tietjen (24 June 1881 – 30 November 1967) was a German conductor and music producer born in Tangier, Morocco.

== Biography ==
Tietjen was born in Tangier, Morocco. At age twenty-three, he held the producer position at the Opera House in Trier and was appointed its director in 1907, holding dual roles until 1922. Simultaneously, he was the director at Saarbrücken and Breslau (now Wrocław, Poland) from 1919 to 1922. Tietjen was the director of the Deutsche Oper Berlin between 1925 and 1927, then the Prussian State Theatre director. Among his productions at this time was the Berlin premiere of Hans Gál's 1923 opera, Die heilige Ente.

From 1931 to 1944, Tietjen served as artistic director at the Bayreuth Festspielhaus for Winifred Wagner with whom he had a romantic liaison. He was appointed to the Prussian State Council by Prussian Minister President Hermann Göring at the end of 1935, serving until the fall of the Nazi regime. In his capacity as director of the Prussian State Theatre, Tietjen approved the closure of Berlin's Kroll Opera House, which the Nazis had criticized as a cultural institution of "Reds and Jews". He also dismissed 27 non-Aryan employees and canceled the contracts of many Jewish performers. Despite this, post-war denazification proceedings only issued him a mild reprimand for "behaving opportunistically".

In 1948 he returned to the directorship of the Deutsche Oper Berlin, serving until 1954, when he was appointed manager and artistic director of the new Hamburg State Opera, a job he held until 1959.

Heinz Tietjen died in 1967 in Baden-Baden.
