= Carl Schlottmann =

German operatic bass

Carl Gerhard Heinrich Schlottmann (26 November 1901 – 30 May 1967) was a German operatic bass.

== Life ==
Born in Berlin, Schlottmann studied law at the Humboldt University of Berlin in his home town and successfully completed his studies with a doctorate. Parallel to his studies, he was a student at the Universität der Künste Berlin in vocal training.

In 1933, Schlottmann made his debut with some success as bass-baritone at the Staatstheater Cottbus. Afterwards, he had engagements at the Nationaltheater Mannheim, and the Alte Oper (Erfurt). He joined the NSDAP in 1937 (Nr. 5.662.615). From 1939, he was at the Mahen Theatre and director of the Reich Theatre Chamber of the "Gau" Bohemia-Moravia.

After the caesura of the Second World War, he was able to build on old successes and came to the Meiningen Court Theatre. For the DEFA he played the father of the gods Zeus in the short film Prometheus.

He later came to the Deutsches Nationaltheater und Staatskapelle Weimar.

Between 1956 and 1958, Schlottmann was a member of the Stadttheater Freiburg. After that, he had no more permanent engagements, but only gave individual guest performances or singing recitals.

Schlottmann died in Freiburg im Breisgau at the age of 65.

== Performances ==
- Part des Kuno in Der Freischütz by Carl Maria von Weber, recording with the orchestra of Reichssender Berlin.
- Alfred P. Doolittle in Scenes from My Fair Lady – Members of the original Hamburger Ensembles. Metronome-LP HLP 10010.

== Roles ==
Bekannt wurde Schlottmann vor allem durch seine Bass- oder Bariton-Partien in Wagner-Opern.

- Sarastro – Die Zauberflöte (Mozart)
- Ein Polizeikommissär – Der Rosenkavalier (Strauss)
- Heinrich, der Vogler – Lohengrin (Wagner)
- Wotan – Das Rheingold (Wagner)
- Hunding – Die Walküre (Wagner)
- Veit Pogner – Die Meistersinger von Nürnberg (Wagner)

== Filmography ==
- 1955: Robert Mayer – der Arzt aus Heilbronn
