= Erich Zimmermann =

German-American economist (1888–1961)

Erich Walter Zimmermann (July 31, 1888 – February 16, 1961) was a resource economist. He was an economist at the University of North Carolina and later the University of Texas.

Zimmermann of the Institutional school of economics called his real world theory the functional theory of mineral resources. His followers have coined the term resourceship to describe the theory. Unlike traditional descriptive inventories, Zimmermann's method offered a synthetic assessment of the human, cultural, and natural factors that determine resource availability.

Zimmermann rejected the assumption of fixity. Resources are not known, fixed things; they are what humans employ to service wants at a given time. To Zimmermann (1933, 3; 1951, 14), only human "appraisal" turns the "neutral stuff" of the earth into resources. What are resources today may not be tomorrow, and vice versa. According to Zimmermann, "resources are not, they become." "According to the definition of ew Zimmerman, the word ,"resource " does not refer to a thing but to a function which a thing may perform to an operation in which it may take part, namely, the function or operation of attaining a given end such a satisfying a want.

== Bibliography ==
- “Resources of the South”, The South-Atlantic Quarterly (July 1933)
- World Resources and Industries: A Functional Appraisal of the Availability of Agricultural and Industrial Resources (1933) New York: Harper & Brothers
- World Resources and Industries, 2nd revised ed. (1951) New York: Harper & Brothers
