= Mareike Morr =

German mezzo-soprano

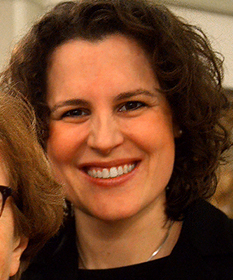
Mareike Morr in 2017

Mareike Morr (born 1977) is a German operatic mezzo-soprano in opera and concert, who has appeared at international opera houses and festivals.

== Life ==
Born in Rotenburg an der Fulda, as a student, Morr regularly took part in the "Jugend musiziert" competitions and was several times a national prize winner in the subjects piano solo and piano chamber music. She began studying piano in 1996 with Karl-Heinz Kämmerling at the Hochschule für Musik, Theater und Medien Hannover. In 2000, she graduated and in 2001 she passed her chamber music examination in the field of song accompaniment as part of the training class. In 2000 she began her vocal studies in Hannover with Carol Richardson-Smith, then with Christiane Iven and with Sylvia Bleimund. Lieder classes with Jan Philip Schulze, Graìnne Dunne and Justus Zeyen were part of her studies. In 2007, she received diplomas in opera singing and as a voice teacher. Since then, she has been working with Charlotte Lehmann. She took master classes, among others with Judith and Irving Beckmann, Ingeborg Danz, Rudolf Piernay, Eugen Rabine, Aribert Reimann, Norman Shetler, Kurt Widmer and at the Internationale Bachakademie Stuttgart.

As a soloist in song and oratorio she performed at various festivals, including "Movimentos", "schubertiade.de", "AlpenKlassik" and "Semanas musicales" in Chile. In 2002 she sang the alto part in Bach's St John Passion at the Kölner Philharmonie and the Théâtre des Champs-Élysées in Paris. In 2005, she sang lieder from Mahler's Des Knaben Wunderhorn with the orchestra of the Hannover Medical School, and the alto solo in Mendelssohn's Elias at the 2005 Kirchentag. In 2006/07 and 2009, she made radio recordings of lieder by György Ligeti, Reimann and Wolfgang Rihm. She has worked regularly with the pianists Thomas Seyboldt and Volker Link. Further concert tours took her to Belarus, Spain and the U.S.

She has been a member of the Staatsoper Hannover from 2008. She has performed at the Bayreuth Festival from 2016, as Siegrune in Die Walküre and in two roles in Parsifal.
