= Martha Mödl =

German opera singer (1912–2001)

Martha Mödl (22 March 1912, Nuremberg – 17 December 2001, Stuttgart) was a German soprano, and later a mezzo-soprano. She specialized in large dramatic roles such as Isolde, Brünnhilde, and particularly Kundry, and is considered, along with Astrid Varnay and Birgit Nilsson, one of the three major postwar Wagner sopranos. She was among the preeminent Wagner sopranos—and most compelling singing actresses—of the twentieth century. She was celebrated for her highly individualized interpretations, exceptional acting ability, intense stage presence, and "rich, sexy voice."

Her career peaked in the early and mid-1950s, which included her Brünnhilde in Wilhelm Furtwängler's famous 1954 studio recording of Die Walküre and his 1953 live recording of Der Ring des Nibelungen (his only uncut recording of the cycle), along with the title role from Fidelio with the same conductor also in 1953 (at first live and then in studio), and Isolde in Herbert von Karajan's 1952 Tristan und Isolde, live from Bayreuth. There have been fully ten recordings of her Kundry released commercially, most associated with the Bayreuth Festival, all from 1949 to 1959. Although she is most known for her portrayals of Wagner's major heroines from 1951 to 1955, her continuous performing career (as mezzo-soprano after the 1950s) lasted in excess of half a century, well into the singer's eighties, through which her acting abilities remained intact.

== Career ==
Mödl spent much of her early life as a bookkeeper and secretary in Nuremberg. At the age of 28, she began vocal studies at the Conservatory of her home town. Having made her debut as Hänsel in Remscheid in 1942, she then added Cherubino, Mignon and Azucena to her roles. Moving to Düsseldorf, she began performing Dorabella, Venus, Octavian, Eboli, Carmen and Klytemnestra. She was then invited to perform in Carmen at Covent Garden in 1949 (returning for the Ring in 1959, Klytemnestra in 1966 and Die schweigsame Frau in 1972), and joined the Hamburg State Opera in the same year. In 1950, she made her La Scala debut as Kundry.

Her Venus in Hamburg was noticed by Wieland Wagner, and she was invited to play the role of Kundry at Bayreuth in 1951, becoming part of a group of singers called the "New Bayreuth," often sharing roles with Astrid Varnay. She went on to perform Isolde in 1952 in an account with Herbert von Karajan and Ramon Vinay that, along with Wilhelm Furtwängler's account of the same year, are considered definitive. A second recording of her Isolde exists from 1959 with Ferdinand Leitner. She joined the Stuttgart Opera, and would reprise the role of Isolde on TV when Leonard Bernstein presented his "What Makes Opera Grand?" segment on Omnibus. Her Fidelio with Wilhelm Furtwängler from 1953 (which was recorded live before ultimately being recorded in the studio) is definitive, though she also recorded the role with Karajan, and went on to open the Wiener Staatsoper with it in 1955 under Karl Böhm. She performed as Kundry and Brünnhilde at the Metropolitan between 1956 and 1960.

Her early career saw three Verdi roles: Lady Macbeth in Macbeth with Joseph Keilberth at the Berlin Staatsoper (1951), the contralto role Ulrica in Un Ballo in Maschera (1951, 1966), and Preziosilla in La Forza del Destino (1952).

Three essentially complete recordings of her Brünnhilde (all three live) have been published: the 1953 and 1955 Ring cycles conducted by Joseph Keilberth, and the 1953 Rome Ring cycle under Furtwängler. The Rome Cycle is frequently cited as being among the best cycles ever recorded, combining the century's leading Wagnerian conductor with an all-star cast and decent sound. (Furtwängler very pointedly passed over the more-famous Varnay for Mödl as the female lead.) The 1955 cycle's Siegfried has not been released, though Brünnhilde appears only for that opera's final duet. The Walküre from this production, along with Keilberth's Walküre from 1954 (discussed below), represent the two occasions on which Mödl and her great contemporary Astrid Varnay sang the two leading women opposite one another; in this case, Mödl was Brünnhilde.

Kundry, however, was to be her defining role, singing it at every Bayreuth production from 1951 to 1959 except for 1958, most famously in 1951, the year the festival re-opened, under Knappertsbusch, and in 1953, under Clemens Krauss. Furtwängler had engaged her to sing Brünnhilde for his studio recording of the Ring, of which, due to his death in 1954, only Die Walküre was ever recorded. The conductor commented: "Other singers can sing what they like; you'll always recognise them. With Martha Mödl, her voice identifies so closely with the role that you are only aware of the character on stage."

She sang the role of Sieglinde only once - at the Bayreuth Festival in 1954 under Keilberth. This was the only time she ever performed Sieglinde (she later called it a mistake). She and Birgit Nilsson share the distinction of each performing the role just once at Bayreuth (Nilsson sang it at the Festival in 1957 under Knappertsbusch), however Mödl sang this role literally only once (i.e. in one spectacle), whereas Nilsson sang it in both 1957 spectacles. This 1954 Ring Cycle (of which only Die Walküre has been released) is the only time the three major postwar Wagner sopranos were recorded together—Varnay as Brünnhilde, Mödl as Sieglinde, and Nilsson as Ortlinde (one of the Walküre sisters). It is also one of only two times Max Lorenz sang at Bayreuth after World War II, and his acting abilities lend the record further interest.

During the 1960s, she had difficulties with her voice from singing such heavy parts for a decade, and returned to singing mezzo-soprano repertoire, such as Klytemnestra in Elektra, the Nurse (Die Frau ohne Schatten) and Waltraute. In 1968 she appeared as Ruth in a German-language production of Gilbert and Sullivan's The Pirates of Penzance, and in 1970 she appeared in The Rise and Fall of the City of Mahagonny in Cologne.

From the 1970s, Mödl appeared in character parts: Grandmother Buryjovka, the Countess in The Queen of Spades in Nice (1989) which she was still performing in Mannheim at the age of 87.

In 1997, she reminisced about her career in the film Love's Debris. A book of conversations with the singer was published in 1998 entitled So war mein Weg. She appeared at several premieres: Elisabeth Tudor (Fortner, 1972), Kabale und Liebe (Von Einem, 1976), and Baal (Cerha, 1999). She never married, and lived with her mother until the latter's death in 1989. Few details about her personal life survive. A brief video from six months prior to her death survives in which she appears with another famous dramatic soprano (of younger generation), Hildegard Behrens.

== Selected discography ==
Her complete discography can be found here.

- Parsifal, 1951 (conducted by Hans Knappertsbusch)
- Oedipus Rex, 1951 (conducted by the composer)
- Tristan und Isolde, 1952 (Herbert von Karajan)
- Parsifal, 1953 (Clemens Krauss)
- Fidelio, 1953 (Wilhelm Furtwängler, both the live and studio recordings)
- Fidelio, 1953 (Herbert von Karajan)
- Der Ring des Nibelungen, 1953 (Wilhelm Furtwängler, as Brünnhilde)
- Der Ring des Nibelungen, 1953 (Joseph Keilberth, as Brünnhilde)
- Die Walküre, 1954 (Wilhelm Furtwängler, as Brünnhilde)
- Die Walküre, 1954 (Joseph Keilberth, as Sieglinde, the only recording in which Nilsson, Varnay, and Mödl sing together)
- Der Ring des Nibelungen, 1955 (Joseph Keilberth, second cycle, as Brünnhilde)
- Elektra, 1964 (Herbert von Karajan)
- The Queen of Spades - VHS, 1992 (Seiji Ozawa), as the Countess
- Lieder: Schubert, Wagner (Wesendonck-Lieder), Wolf, Mahler, Schumann, R. Strauss

== Selected filmography ==
- The Merry Wives of Windsor (1950)

== Bibliography ==
- The Last Prima Donnas, by Lanfranco Rasponi, Alfred A Knopf, 1982; ISBN 0-394-52153-6
- Martha Mödl discography at Discogs
