= Stefan Herheim =

Norwegian opera director

Stefan Herheim (born Oslo, 13 March 1970), is a Norwegian opera director, based in Germany.

== Life ==
He studied cello while working as a production assistant at Norwegian National Opera in Oslo. From 1994 to 1999, he studied opera direction with Götz Friedrich at Hochschule für Musik und Theater Hamburg.

== Awards ==
He has been named opera director of the year (Regisseur des Jahres) three times by the German magazine Opernwelt—in 2007 for a Don Giovanni at the Aalto Theatre in Essen, in 2009 for an acclaimed Parsifal at the Bayreuth Festival, and in 2010 for a Rosenkavalier at the Staatsoper Stuttgart.

== Sources ==
- wagneropera.net profile page. List of productions, links to interviews, videos and photos
- Royal Opera House, London, brief biography of Herheim
- The Guardian, profile of Herheim's Wagner work, 29 April 2010.
