= Österreichische Mediathek =

Austrian archive for sound recordings and videos

Coordinates: 48.1923°N 16.3487°E

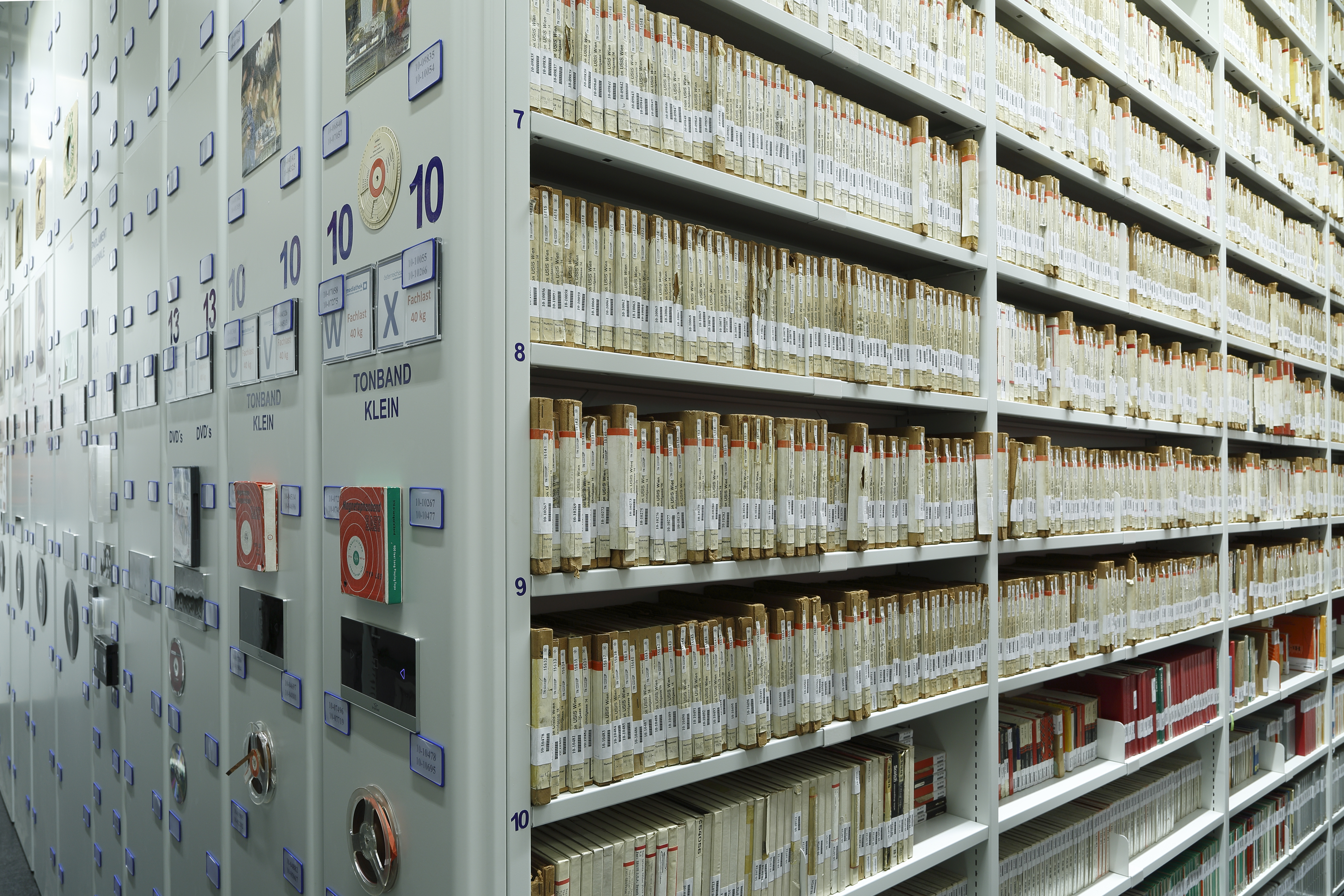
Medienarchiv Österreichische Mediathek Analogspeicher

The Österreichische Mediathek ("Austrian Mediatheque") is the Austrian archive for sound recordings and videos on cultural and contemporary history. It was founded in 1960 as Österreichische Phonothek (Austrian Phonothek) by the Ministry of Education and has been a branch of the Technisches Museum Wien (Vienna Technical Museum) since 2001. As video and sound archive, the Österreichische Mediathek is responsible for the preservation of the Austrian audio-visual cultural heritage (with the exception of film on photographic carrier material and photography).

== Duties and responsibilities ==
The Österreichische Mediathek collects audio-visual media published or produced in Austria, as well as international recordings relating to Austria. Further responsibilities include the selective recording of TV and radio programmes received in Austria. In order to preserve its collections, the Österreichische Mediathek specializes in digitisation and digital long-term archiving of audio and video material. Scientific projects review the archival stock with regard to content.

== Collections ==
The collections of the Österreichische Mediathek mainly cover the subject areas music, literature, history, politics and science. The documents span the period from the 19th century to the present and include sound carriers such as instantaneous discs, shellac records, vinyl records, audio tapes, DAT cassettes, compact cassettes, CDs, DVDs, different video formats as well as various file formats.

The collections include (among others):

- the collection of the Austrian Institute for Scientific Film (ÖWF; Österreichisches Bundesinstitut für den wissenschaftlichen Film);
- live recordings of the National Assembly sessions of the Austrian Parliament;
- live audio recordings of Burgtheater premiers from 1955 on;
- the collection Rot-Weiß-Rot (Red-White-Red) with radio recordings from the post-war period;
- the collection Günther Schifter with shellacs from the inter-war period;
- recordings of selected radio and TV broadcasts;
- oral history interviews as well as Austrian artists’ and scientists’ estates...

== Online archive ==
The Österreichische Mediathek is a reference archive. Parts of the stock are also available online. Virtual exhibitions and online media databases are dedicated to various central subject areas: an acoustic chronicle illustrates Austrian history from 1900 to 2008, the web platform journale.at provides the radio station [Ö1]’s sound radio journals from 1967 to 1999 in full length and the online archive “Österreich am Wort” offers over 9000 sound recordings and videos on Austrian cultural history, also accessible online.

== See also ==
- IASA International Association of Sound and Audiovisual Archives
