= Ivar F. Andresen =

Norwegian opera singer (1896–1940)

Ivar Frithiof Andresen
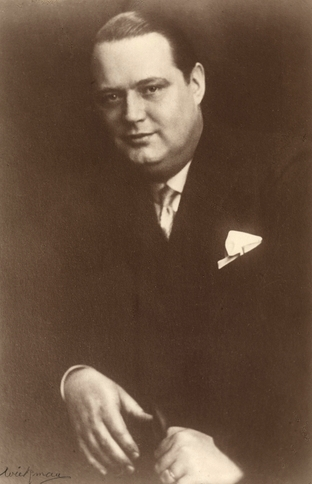
- Born: July 27, 1896; Oslo, Norway
- Died: November 6, 1940 (aged 44); Stockholm, Sweden
- Occupation: Opera singer
- Family: Alf Henry Andresen (brother)

Ivar Frithiof Andresen (27 July 1896 – 6 November 1940) was a Norwegian operatic singer who pursued a successful international career in Europe and the United States.

Andresen was the first Norwegian to perform at the Metropolitan Opera in New York City (preceding his famous compatriot, the great Wagnerian soprano Kirsten Flagstad, by five years). A bass, he appeared in operas composed by Wagner, Mozart and Verdi.

== Biography ==
Andresen was born in Kristiania (today Oslo). After making his debut in Stockholm in 1919, he worked at Kungliga Teatern (now Kungliga Operan, or Royal Swedish Opera), from 1921 to 1926. He then performed at the Dresden Semperoper (in 1926–1931) and the Städtische Oper Berlin (1931–1935), and also appeared as a guest artist at the New York Met (1930–1932) and the Bayreuth Festival (1927–1936).

In England, he sang at the Royal Opera House, Covent Garden, in 1928–1931 and at the Glyndebourne Festival in 1935.

Andresen's singing earned considerable critical acclaim during his appearances in England, America and Germany, but developing health problems would curtail his career, and he died at the age of 44, in Stockholm, during the early stages of World War II.

He left, however, a sizeable legacy of 78-rpm gramophone recordings made in the 1920s and 1930s, which have been re-issued on compact disc.

Today, in Norway, Andresen is probably best known not for being an opera star, but for adorning the box of the cough-drop brand "IFA", produced by the Nidar company. Since the 1930s, his face has been seen on the package, along with a quote recommending the product to "singers, public speakers, smokers and athletes". Andresen was also the great-uncle to Secretary General of NATO and former Norwegian prime minister Jens Stoltenberg.

== Recordings on CD ==
- Lebendige Vergangenheit – Ivar Andrésen (arias by Fromental Halévy, Giacomo Meyerbeer, Mozart, Giuseppe Verdi, and Richard Wagner) Preiser Records CD PSR 89028
- Lebendige Vergangenheit – Ivar Andrésen Vol. 2 (arias and Lieder by Meyerbeer, Richard Wagner, Carl Loewe, Richard Strauss, and Ludwig Fischer) Preiser Records CD PSR 89125
