= Eva Chamberlain =

Daughter of Richard Wagner and Cosima Liszt

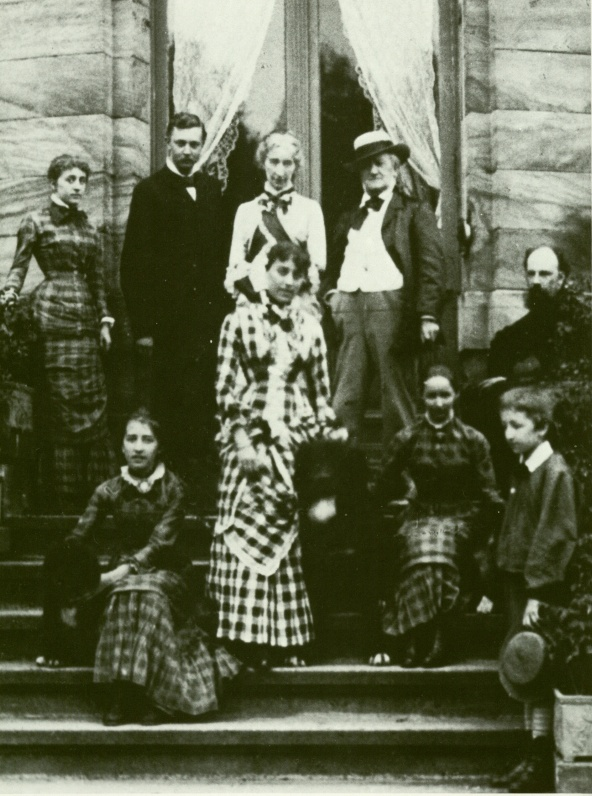
- Wagner family, August 1881: Blandine Gravina, Heinrich von Stein (Siegfried's home teacher), Cosima Wagner, Richard Wagner, painter Paul von Joukowsky; foreground: Isolde Beidler, Daniela von Bülow, Eva, Siegfried Wagner
- Born: Eva Maria von Bülow; 17 February 1867; Lucerne, Switzerland
- Died: 26 May 1942 (aged 75); Bayreuth, Third Reich
- Spouse: Houston Stewart Chamberlain (m. 1908; died 1927)
- Parent(s): Richard Wagner; Cosima Wagner
- Relatives: Franz Liszt (grandfather); Isolde Beidler (sister); Siegfried Wagner (brother); Blandine Gravina (half-sister); Daniela von Bülow (half-sister); Hans von Bülow (adoptive father)

Eva Maria Chamberlain (née von Bülow; 17 February 1867 – 26 May 1942) was the daughter of Richard Wagner and Cosima Wagner, and the wife of Houston Stewart Chamberlain. When she was born, her mother was still married to Hans von Bülow. Through her mother, she was also a granddaughter of Franz Liszt. With her siblings Isolde and Siegfried, Eva was brought up by a house teacher.

In 1906, Eva took over the care of her sick mother at Villa Wahnfried in Bayreuth. She also took care of her mail, and was the only family member to have access to the family archive. Eva stated that "her mother had expressed the wish that the diaries be in her daughter's hands." In 1908 she married Houston Stewart Chamberlain.

In the 1920s and 1930s, she and her half-sister Daniela were the head of the Altwagnerians who opposed any modernization of Richard Wagner's works. In 1933 she received the honorary citizenship of the city of Bayreuth. She was also a bearer of the Golden Party Badge of the Nazi Party. When she died of cancer in 1942, she was given an honorary funeral by the NSDAP, in which Adolf Wagner (unrelated) gave the eulogy.

== Gallery ==
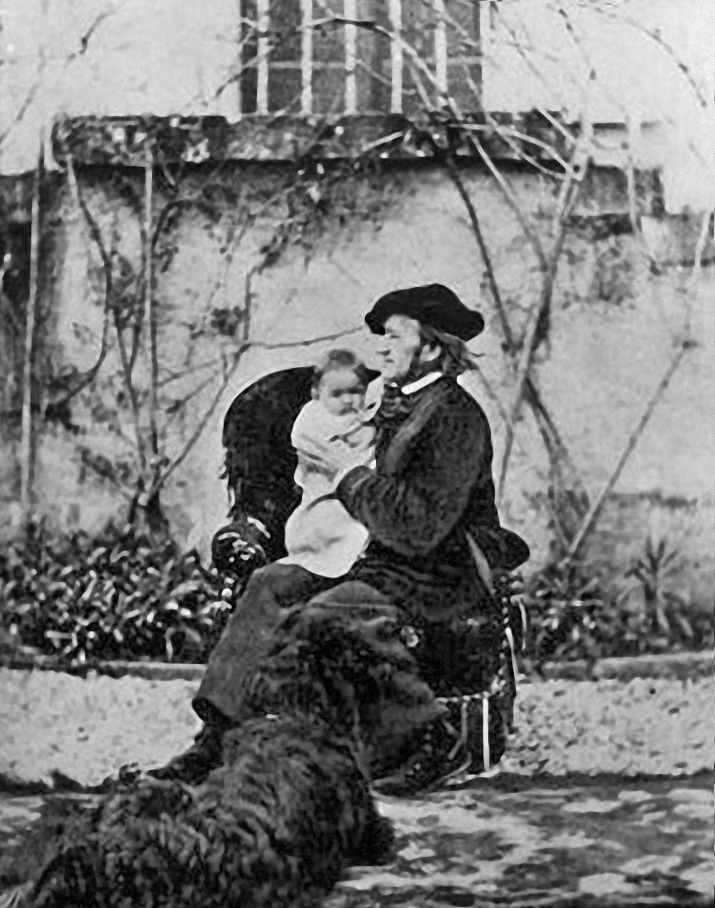
Richard Wagner with Eva 1867

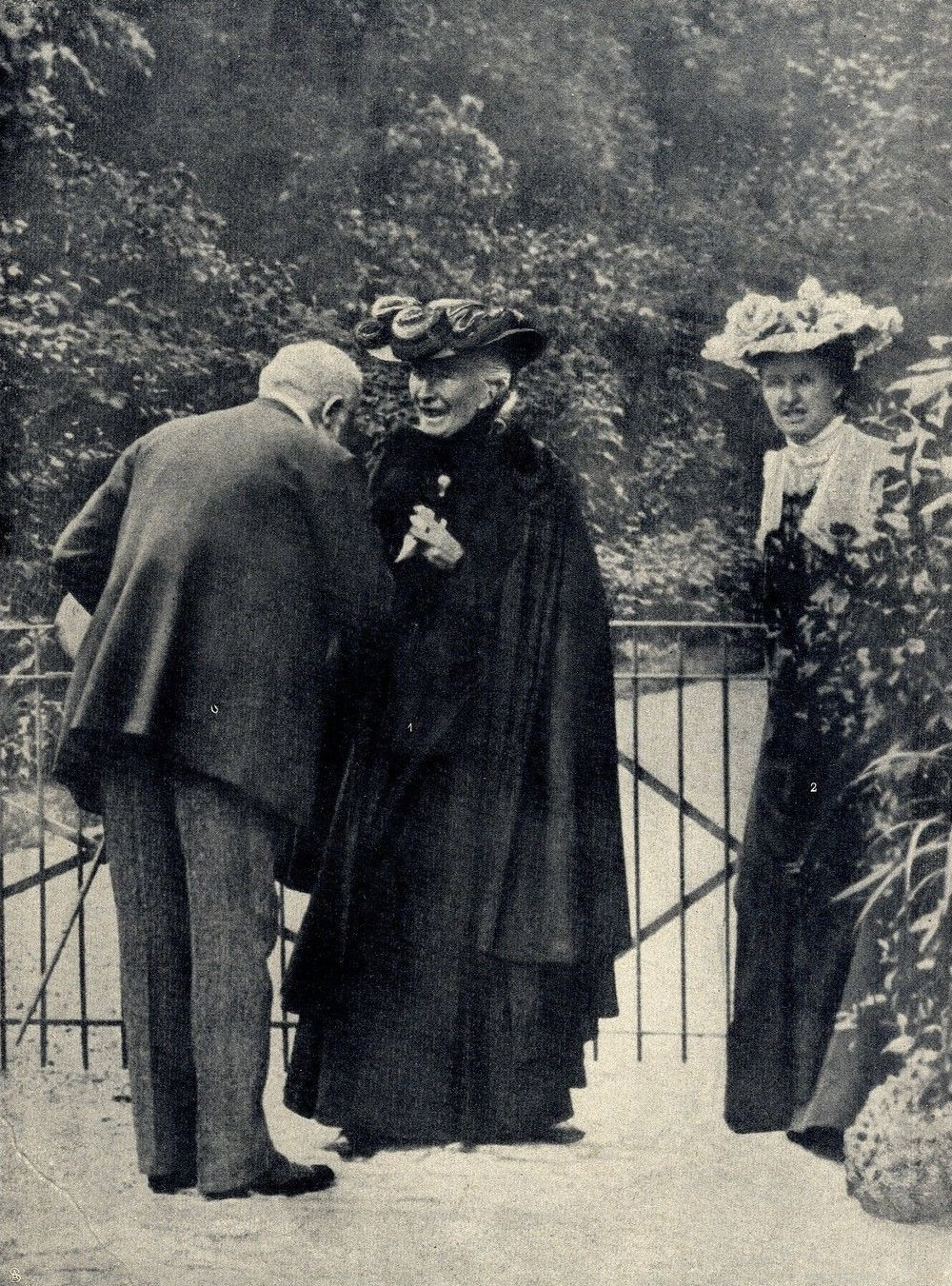
Cosima Wagner with her daughter Eva, 1906
