= Lyric Suite (Grieg) =

Orchestration of several piano works

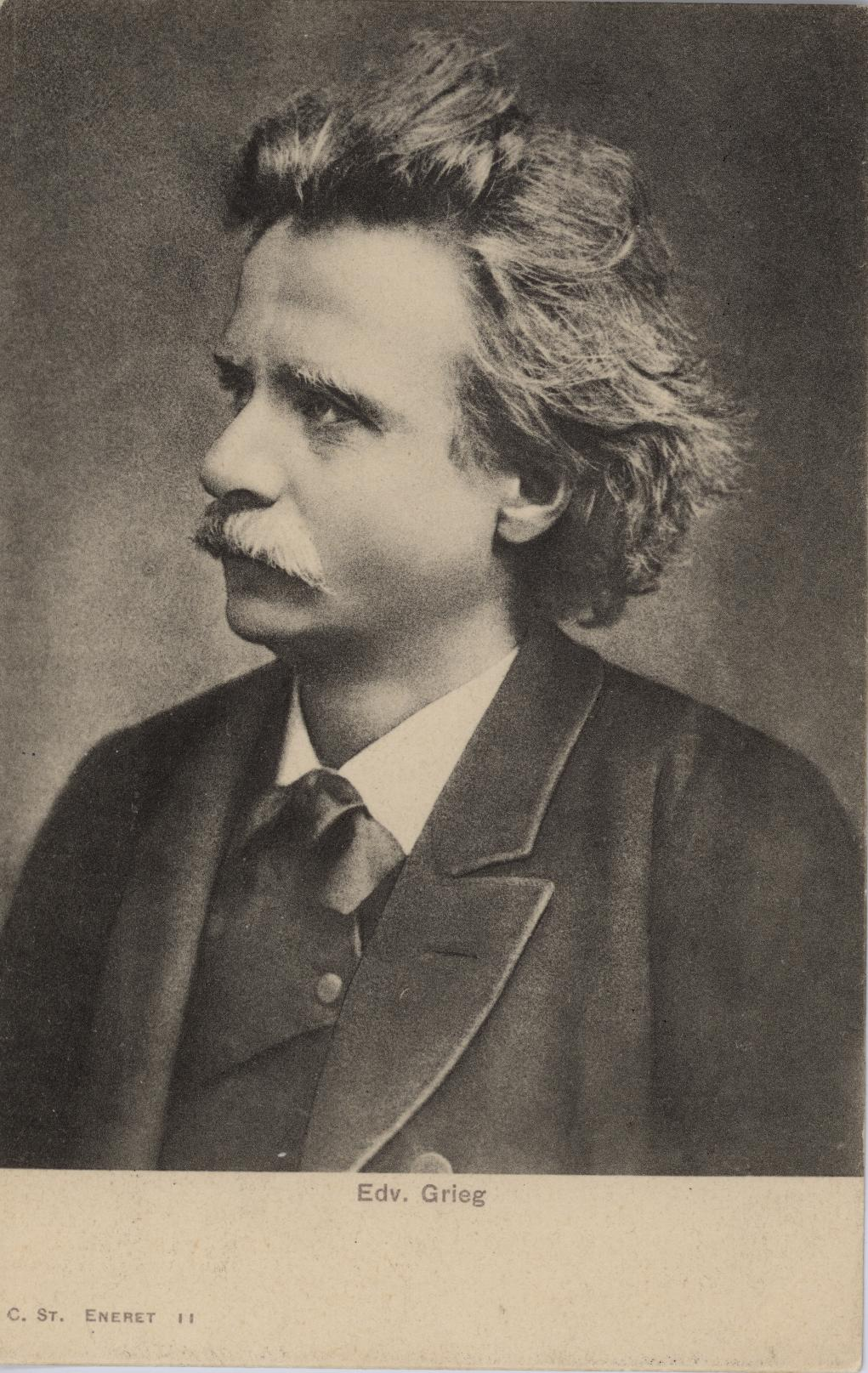
Edvard Grieg ca. 1886

Edvard Grieg's Lyric Suite is an orchestration of four of the six piano pieces from Book V of his Lyric Pieces, Op. 54. Both Grieg and the Austro-Hungarian conductor Anton Seidl had a hand in the orchestration. It consists of three pieces revised by Grieg from Seidl's arrangements, and one piece arranged by Grieg alone. It was one of Grieg's later works and his last orchestral work.

== History ==
Grieg wrote the six Lyric Pieces of Book V for piano in 1891. The original order was:

1. Shepherd Boy (Gjætergut)
2. Norwegian March (Gangar)
3. March of the Dwarfs (Troldtog)
4. Notturno
5. Scherzo
6. Bell-Ringing (Klokkeklang)

In 1894, Anton Seidl, the conductor of the New York Philharmonic, orchestrated four of the pieces for his orchestra to play. He gave the work the title of Norwegian Suite. The four pieces he chose were:

2. Norwegian March
3. March of the Dwarfs
4. Notturno
6. Bell-Ringing

Seidl died in 1898. In 1905, with the assistance of Daniela Thode (1860–1940; the daughter of Cosima Wagner by her first husband Hans von Bülow, and the grand-daughter of Franz Liszt), Grieg obtained the score of Seidl's arrangement but was dissatisfied with it in some respects. He wrote to Seidl's widow, saying that, while her late husband's work had considerable merit, it did not fully accord with his own conception of the pieces, and he had therefore revised Seidl's orchestrations. Seidl had worked alongside Richard Wagner for a number of years, making the first copy of the score of Der Ring des Nibelungen, and conducting the Ring Cycle many times in Germany and America. He was undoubtedly influenced by Wagner's heavy Germanic instrumentation, which did not fit well with Grieg's lighter, more subtle and folkloristic approach.

== Structure ==
Grieg gave his revised arrangement the title of Lyric Suite. Although he did complete his revision of Seidl's arrangement of No. 6 Bell-Ringing, he chose not to include it. Instead, he orchestrated the first piece, Shepherd Boy, directly from the original piano score, and included it in the suite. The other three pieces were set for full orchestra, but Shepherd Boy was arranged for strings alone.

Grieg slightly altered the order of the numbers in the orchestral suite by swapping No. 4 Notturno with No. 3 March of the Dwarfs. The final order is:

1. Shepherd Boy
2. Norwegian March
3. Notturno (originally No. 4)
4. March of the Dwarfs (originally No. 3)

He conducted the Lyric Suite a number of times in the two remaining years of his life, and it has been recorded and performed many times by other conductors.

Seidl's Norwegian Suite has not survived in the repertoire. The score is now part of the Seidl Collection at Columbia University Library.

== Other arrangements of Lyric Pieces ==
In 1899, Grieg orchestrated two of the pieces from Book IX, Op. 68.

- No. 4 Evening in the Mountains was set for oboe, horns and strings.

- No. 5 At the Cradle was set for strings alone.
