= Isolde Beidler =

Daughter of Richard and Cosima Wagner (1865–1919)

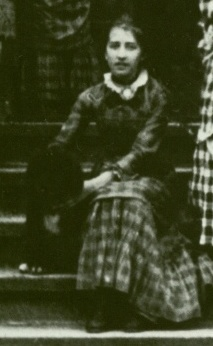
- Isolde Josefa, 1881
- Born: Isolde Josefa Ludovika von Bülow; 10 April 1865; Munich, Kingdom of Bavaria
- Died: 7 February 1919 (aged 53); Munich, Bavaria, Germany
- Known for: She was Richard Wagner's eldest daughter by his marriage to Cosima
- Spouse: Franz Beidler (m. 1900)
- Children: Franz Wilhelm Beidler
- Parent(s): Richard Wagner; Cosima Liszt
- Relatives: Franz Liszt (grandfather); Siegfried Wagner (brother); Eva Chamberlain (sister); Blandine Gravina (half-sister); Daniela von Bülow (half-sister); Hans von Bülow (adoptive father)

Isolde Josefa Ludovika Beidler (née von Bülow; 10 April 1865 – 7 February 1919) was the first child of the composer Richard Wagner and his wife, who is generally known as Cosima Wagner (though the two of them married only in 1870).

Isolde herself married the Swiss-born conductor Franz Beidler (1872–1930) and was the mother of author Franz Wilhelm Beidler (1901–1981), celebrated at his birth as "Richard Wagner's first grandchild".

== Biography ==
=== First years ===
Isolde Josefa Ludovika von Bülow was born in Munich slightly more than nine months after her parents Richard Wagner and Cosima Liszt had spent an amorous week alone together in a house on the shores of Lake Starnberg, south of Munich and north of Garmisch. Both her parents were music celebrities: the child's illegitimacy risked scandal, leading to professional, social and financial difficulties. Cosima's husband Hans von Bülow, who was hugely in awe of Wagner's musical talent, acknowledged the baby as his own, and she started out in life as Isolde von Bülow. (Hans von Bülow is reported as having stated that "if it had been anybody but Wagner, I would have shot him".) When, in 1894, von Bülow died, Isolde would therefore be one of his legally recognised heirs, along with two elder half-sisters who really were the daughters of Hans von Bülow and Cosima Wagner: this would contribute to family ructions.

According to at least one source Isolde was, during her childhood, her mother's favourite daughter. As she grew to womanhood she was nevertheless capable of treating her many admirers with waspishness. She would address the fervent 'Wagnerite' Houston Stewart Chamberlain (who was, in fairness, married to someone else when he started showing an interest in Isolde) simply as "Glotzauge" (Goggle-eyes). Chamberlain later joined the family, marrying Isolde's sister Eva: in the dynastic wranglings that were a feature of Wagner family life during the early decades of the twentieth century, he was one of those who led the faction that sought to isolate Isolde from the others.

=== Marriage ===
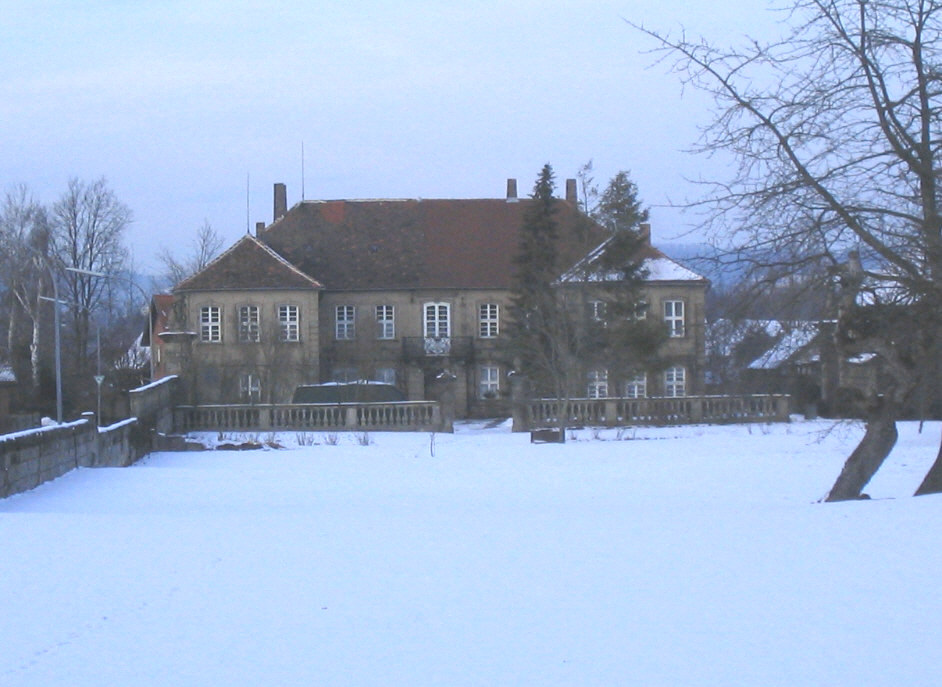
Schloss Colmdorf

On 20 December 1900, now aged 35, Isolde married 28-year-old Swiss conductor Franz Beidler. Beidler had arrived in Bayreuth in 1896 to take a post as an assistant musical director at the Festspielhaus, and like his new wife was, according to sources, capable of singular tactlessness. The couple settled (as tenants) at Colmdorf Manor near Bayreuth, where Beidler set up a private aviary of more than 100 exotic birds that he had collected in Russia. Wagner's widow, Cosima, was not impressed. The couple's ambitious lifestyle was not matched by Beidler's earnings as a young conductor working in Bayreuth and Moscow. However, under the adept management of Cosima Wagner, the estate that the family had inherited from Richard Wagner had become fabulously wealthy, and Isolde continued to receive a financial allowance from her mother, which was becoming one of several factors giving rise to inter-generational tensions.

=== Frictions with the family ===
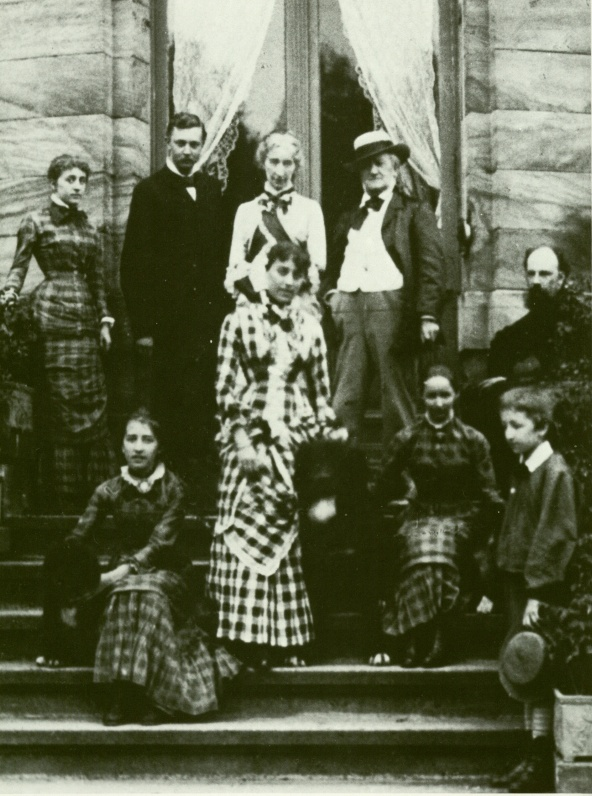
Wagner Family and friends in front of villa Wahnfried in 1881; Blandine von Bülow, Heinrich von Stein (Siegfried's teacher), Cosima & Richard Wagner, Paul von Joukowsky (family friend); below, from l to r: Isolde, Daniela von Bülow, Eva and Siegfried

Isolde gave birth to Franz Wilhelm Beidler, Richard Wagner's first (and until 1917 only) grandchild on 16 October 1901, and signs of family harmony briefly surfaced. "I don't think one can imagine a more beautiful or more loving mother", the grandmother gushed to a friend, "...she refuses to be parted from the child, feeds it herself & says she can't describe the pleasure she feels when the child takes her breast in its mouth". Between 1902 and 1905 the couple lived in Moscow and St. Petersburg where Beidler held a post as Imperial Music Director. After they returned to Colmdorf relations broke down completely between Isolde's husband and her mother, who wrote a letter to Beidler on 11 August 1906 assuring him that if Isolde were to ask her for advice on the matter she would advise her daughter to separate from him as a matter of urgency. It was dishonourable for a man "to live on his wife's money, and to do nothing, and to allow his debts to be paid off by others against whom he behaves as you behave against us". Isolde tried to mediate with her mother on behalf of her husband, but it seemed that by that point the Beidlers were coming to be seen increasingly as outsiders by the rest of the family. It did not help that Siegfried Wagner was only a couple of years older than Beidler, and had become inclined to view his brother-in-law as a potential rival for the conductors' podium at Bayreuth Festspielhaus, where in 1908 Siegfried took over the artistic directorship from his mother. Franz Beidler had returned from Russia to conduct The Ring in 1904, but his 1906 Parsifal turned out to be his last appearance as a conductor at Bayreuth. In the angry letter that Cosima sent to Beidler in August 1906, she shared her opinion that he had "proved incapable" in respect of both productions.

Franz Beidler embarked on an affair with a young singer called Emmy Zimmermann in 1910. This had various consequences, including the birth, on 22 May 1912, of a baby whom they called Senta Eva Elisabeth. A separation between Isolde and her husband had been on her mother's agenda since at least as far back as 1906, but Isolde resolutely stood by Franz "because he is my husband and I have a child from him", as she wrote to her half-sister Daniela. Franz and Isolde Beidler moved from Colmdorf to Munich in 1912, installing themselves in a large third-floor apartment in Prinzregentenplatz. Isolde was still receiving a significant proportion of the Wagner family income, along with reimbursement from the Wagner estate of certain further one-time expenses such as their 1912 relocation costs. Other sources indicate that the relocation costs were financed by a sympathetic family friend called Adolf von Groß. There are suggestions that the Beidlers hoped that the move to Munich would enable them to distance themselves from the ever-more-toxic family politics of the Wagner clan, centred on Bayreuth. Arguments over inheritance were becoming increasingly bitter. Also, in 1912 Isolde was diagnosed with serious lung damage, which seems to have been a symptom of the tuberculosis that would ultimately kill her.

=== Legal disputes ===
Wagner family finances took a hit in 1913 after copyright protection on the composer's works expired. Siegfried reduced the annual "voluntary subsidy" paid to his sister to 8,000 marks. Isolde's threats proved unproductive so she launched a legal inheritance case in the Bayreuth District Court against her mother. The family reacted by denying that Richard Wagner was Isolde's father. The technology was not available at that time to determine this issue beyond reasonable doubt, so the critical piece of evidence became Cosima's memory. The case of Frau Isolde Beidler gegen Frau Dr. Cosima Wagner opened on 6 March 1914 and ended on 19 June that year, when the court dismissed the plaintiff. Sources suggest that it would have been remarkable for a Bavarian court to find against the powerful Wagner clan. Isolde's lawyer had accordingly made some attempt to recruit public opinion to back his client's side, which had the effect of intensifying the mutual bitterness between the parties. Cosima and her son Siegfried were, indeed, subjected to savage headlines; and some publications even came close to breaking a widely respected taboo by publishing very broad hints about Siegfried's homosexuality. None of that changed the outcome in court, however. Isolde was now expressly not acknowledged as a daughter of Richard Wagner. Required to pay the substantial legal costs incurred by both sides, she became increasingly embittered against her family. The exception was her half-sister Daniela, with whom she remained in contact. Isolde remained married to Franz, even though his tally of illegitimate children increased to three, of two different mothers. The publicity storm was cut short by the assassination of Archduke Franz Ferdinand in Sarajevo. Eventually Siegfried Wagner managed to find a wife, described dismissively but accurately by some as "an English orphan". Nevertheless, Siegfried's marriage to Winifred Williams and the birth of Wieland Wagner in 1917 meant that at last Franz Wilhelm Beidler was no longer (disregarding the dispute over Isolde's paternity) Richard Wagner's only grandchild.

=== Death ===
The lung damage that doctors had diagnosed as tuberculosis was never cured, and Isolde Beidler sickened further in Munich. She received treatment at a nursing home in Partenkirchen where, ominously, the disease was diagnosed in both lungs. Patient notes from the Partenkirchen clinic strongly indicate that Beidler was most uncooperative in her treatment. When instructed by the doctor to lie down for long periods, she insisted on "doing something very rash such as taking long excursions in bad weather, drinking excessive amounts of alcohol etc". It was perhaps reflective of the extent to which knowledge of the Wagner family feud had become public property that the notes mentioned also that the patient's "exceedingly disagreeable domestic arrangements... [were] ... having a highly disruptive effect on the whole course of her treatment ... often producing the most severe agitation". Rather than remain in the sanatorium until her cure had its effect, she periodically discharged herself and returned to Munich. Later she moved for a few months to Davos, before moving on again to stay with Daniela on the shores of Lake Garda and then, finally, taking herself back to Munich in June 1918 when she sensed that the end was drawing near.

Isolde Beidler died in her Prinzregentenplatz apartment at mid-afternoon on 7 February 1919 at the end of a lengthy period of intensely painful illness. Her family was represented at her burial three days later only by her husband, her son, and her half-sister. Her mother was told of her death, in response to a casual enquiry, only in 1929.
