= Henry Thode =

German art historian (1857-1920)

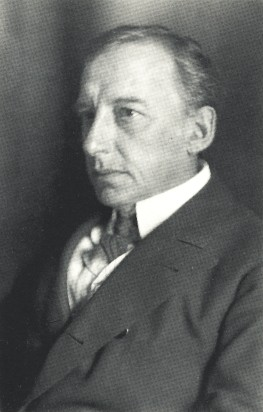
- Henry Thode; photograph by Jacob Hilsdorf
- Born: 13 January 1857; Dresden, Germany
- Died: 19 November 1920 (aged 63); Copenhagen, Denmark
- Occupation: art historian
- Spouse: Daniela von Bülow (m. 1886; div. 1914)

Henry Thode (13 January 1857 – 19 November 1920) was a German art historian. He was born in Dresden and died in Copenhagen.

== Biography ==
He was an art historian at the time of the Weimar republic. He wrote against the prevailing ideas of the time that art from outside of Germany, such as French Impressionism was superior to traditional academic or native art.

Thode believed that great German art should illustrate technical skill, realism and the German spirit. He also felt that art should be understood by all, not just academics and the bourgeois. Thode wrote a great deal about how the modern art of the Impressionists attempted to both destroy 'true' German art and the 'true' German spirit.

His philosophies were very important in the formulation of the cultural policies of the Third Reich, especially in terms of 'degenerate' art.

His wife was Daniela von Bülow, first daughter of Hans von Bülow and Cosima Liszt.
