= Bayreuth canon =

Operas by Wagner performed at the Bayreuth Festival

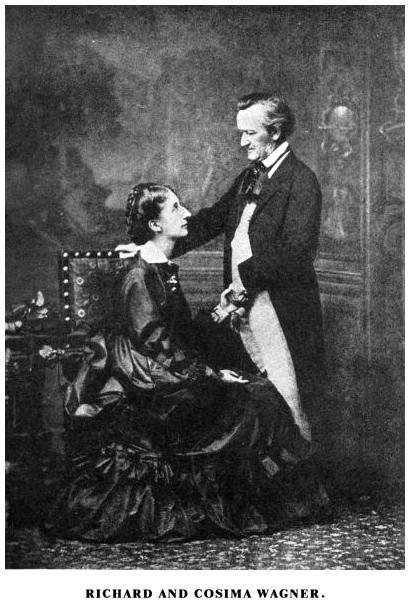
Richard Wagner and his second wife Cosima, who established the Bayreuth canon

The Bayreuth canon consists of those operas by the German composer Richard Wagner (1813–1883) that have been performed at the Bayreuth Festival. The festival, which is dedicated to the staging of these works, was founded by Wagner in 1876 in the Bavarian town of Bayreuth, and has continued under the directorship of his family since his death. Although it was not originally held annually, it has taken place in July and August every year since the 75th anniversary season in 1951. Its venue is the Bayreuth Festspielhaus, which was built for the first festival. Attendance at the festival is often thought of as a pilgrimage made by Wagner aficionados.

The operas in the Bayreuth canon are the last ten of the thirteen that Wagner completed. He rejected the first three – Die Feen, Das Liebesverbot and Rienzi – as apprentice works. Although these have been staged elsewhere and Rienzi was very popular into the early 20th century, the works in the canon exceed them, both in the number of performances given and in the number of available recordings. The term Bayreuth canon is therefore sometimes taken to mean the composer's mature operas. Georg Solti was the first conductor to complete studio recordings of all the works in the canon, starting in 1958 with Das Rheingold and finishing in 1986 with Lohengrin.

== Components ==
The components of the canon are as follows:

Das Rheingold, Die Walküre, Siegfried and Götterdämmerung
These are the four parts of Der Ring des Nibelungen. The Bayreuth Festival was created for the first complete staging of the Ring in 1876. The Ring was next staged in Bayreuth in 1896, the only other season when the cycle has been performed there unaccompanied by other operas. Since then, it has appeared during most seasons.

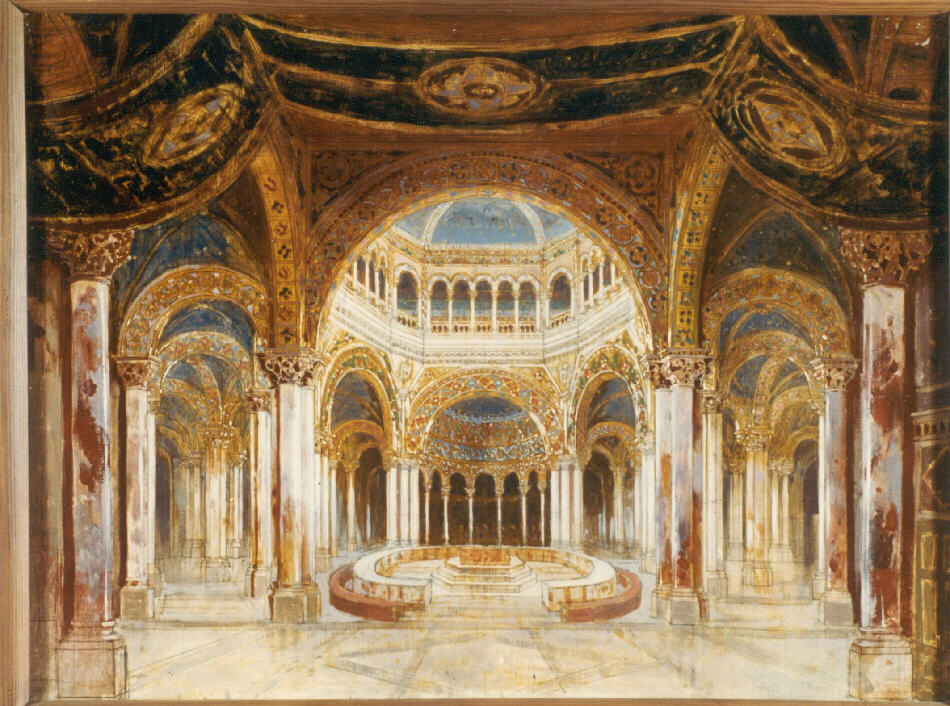
Paul von Joukowsky's design for the Grail scene for the original 1882 production of Parsifal

Parsifal
This work was first performed at the second Bayreuth Festival in 1882. The degree to which Parsifal is associated with one venue, the Festspielhaus, makes it unique among major theatrical works. Wagner dubbed the opera a Bühnenweihfestspiel, which opera director Mike Ashman translates as a "festival work to consecrate a stage". Ashman explains this as meaning that it was intended to secure the financial future of the Bayreuth Festspielhaus and allow the composer's heirs to continue running the festival profitably. Parsifal was staged nowhere else until 1903 when the Metropolitan Opera in New York broke the embargo placed on theatrical performances outside Bayreuth by Wagner and his widow Cosima.

Parsifal far exceeds the other members of the canon in the number of performances it has received at Bayreuth. It is the only work to have had three festival seasons (1882, 1883 and 1884) dedicated solely to its staging, and was performed every season from 1882 until the start of World War II, with the exception of 1896 when Cosima first revived the Ring. Most of these performances were of the original production, which received 205 performances before a new staging was introduced in 1934. Another production – the influential one by the composer's grandson Wieland – was staged every year from 1951, when Bayreuth reopened after the war, until 1973, accumulating 101 performances.

Der fliegende Holländer, Tannhäuser, Lohengrin, Tristan und Isolde and Die Meistersinger von Nürnberg
Cosima introduced these five works from 1886 onwards, after she started running the festival on a continuing basis. In introducing these, she fulfilled her dead husband's wishes but over an extended timescale. Meistersinger is the only work in the canon, apart from Parsifal and the Ring cycle, to have had whole festival seasons, those of 1943 and 1944, devoted solely to it.

== Performances at Bayreuth ==
As of the completion of the 2018 festival, 2725 performances have been given at the Bayreuth Festival of the operas in the canon, distributed as in the following table.

Key
symbol and colour	meaning
^{†}	Ring opera
^{‡}	Introduced by Richard Wagner
^{*}	Introduced by Cosima Wagner

Opera	Completed	Première	Bayreuth première	Most recent Bayreuth season (to 2026)	Total Bayreuth performances (to 2026)
Das Rheingold^{†} (The Rhinegold)	1854	22 September 1869	13 August 1876^{‡}	2026	252
Die Walküre^{†} (The Valkyrie)	1856	26 June 1870	14 August 1876^{‡}	2026	252
Siegfried^{†}	1869	16 August 1876	16 August 1876^{‡}	2026	241
Götterdämmerung^{†} (The Twilight of the Gods)	1874	17 August 1876	17 August 1876^{‡}	2026	245
Parsifal	1882	26 July 1882	26 July 1882^{‡}	2027	573
Tristan und Isolde (Tristan and Isolde)	1859	10 June 1865	25 July 1886^{*}	2025	266
Die Meistersinger von Nürnberg (The Mastersingers of Nuremberg)	1867	21 June 1868	23 July 1888^{*}	2027	343
Tannhäuser	1845	19 October 1845	22 August 1891^{*}	2027	253
Lohengrin	1848	28 August 1850	20 July 1894^{*}	2027	261
Der fliegende Holländer (The Flying Dutchman)	1841	2 January 1843	22 July 1901^{*}	2026	261

== See also ==
- List of works for the stage by Wagner

== Sources ==
- Ashman, Mike "A Very Human Epic" in John (1986) pp. 7–14.
- Ashman, Mike "Tannhäuser – an obsession" in John (1988) pp. 7–15.
- Bayreuther Festspiele (2015) "Die Aufführungen sortiert nach Festspielleitung". Statistics of performances at Bayreuth Festival sorted by festival director at official festival site. Version updated after 2015 festival. In German, accessed 24 May 2012.
- Beckett, Lucy (1981) Richard Wagner: Parsifal, Cambridge, Cambridge University Press, ISBN 0-521-29662-5.
- Best, Wallace Denino (2005) Passionately Human, No Less Divine:Religion and Culture in Black Chicago 1915–1952, Princeton NJ, Princeton University Press, ISBN 0-691-11578-8.
- Carnegy, Patrick (2006) Wagner and the Art of the Theatre, New Haven, Yale University Press, ISBN 0-300-10695-5.
- Cooke, Deryck (1979) I Saw The World End: A study of Wagner's Ring, Oxford, Oxford University Press, ISBN 0-19-315318-1.
- Deathridge, John "An Introduction to The Flying Dutchman" in John (1982) pp. 13–26.
- Greenfield, Edward "Solti at 75", Gramophone, October 1987, accessed 19 December 2009.
- Griffiths, Paul "Little Big Man", The Nation, 24 November 2004, accessed 19 December 2009.
- Gurewitsch, Matthew "Music: Bayreuth, Like Wagner, Survives the Critics", The New York Times, 5 September 1999, accessed 19 December 2009.
- Headington, Christopher, Westbrook, Roy & Barfoot, Terry (1991) Opera: A History, London, Arrow Books Ltd, ISBN 0-09-985150-4.
- John, Nicholas (Series Editor) (1981) English National Opera/The Royal Opera Opera Guide 6 Tristan and Isolde, London, John Calder, ISBN 0-7145-3849-3.
- John, Nicholas (Series Editor) (1982) English National Opera/The Royal Opera House Opera Guide 12: Der Fliegende Holländer/The Flying Dutchman, London, John Calder, ISBN 0-7145-3920-1.
- John, Nicholas (Series Editor) (1983a) English National Opera/The Royal Opera Guide Opera Guide 19 The Mastersingers of Nuremberg/Die Meistersinger von Nürnberg, London, John Calder, ISBN 0-7145-3961-9.
- John, Nicholas (Series Editor) (1983b) English National Opera/The Royal Opera Opera Guide 21 The Valkyrie/Die Walküre, London, John Calder, ISBN 0-7145-4019-6.
- John, Nicholas (Series Editor) (1983c) English National Opera/The Royal Opera Opera Guide 31 The Twilight of the Gods/Götterdämmerung, London, John Calder, ISBN 0-7145-4063-3.
- John, Nicholas (Editor) (1983d) Programme for 1983 English National Opera production of Lohengrin, London, English National Opera.
- John, Nicholas (Series Editor) (1984) English National Opera/The Royal Opera Opera Guide 28 Siegfried, London, John Calder, ISBN 0-7145-4040-4.
- John, Nicholas (Series Editor) (1985) English National Opera/The Royal Opera Opera Guide 35: The Rhinegold/Das Rheingold, London, John Calder, ISBN 0-7145-4078-1.
- John, Nicholas (Series Editor) (1986) English National Opera/The Royal Opera Opera Guide No.34, Parsifal, London, John Calder, ISBN 0-7145-4079-X.
- John, Nicholas (Series Editor) (1988) English National Opera/The Royal Opera Opera Guide 39 Tannhäuser, London, John Calder, ISBN 0-7145-4147-8.
- Kinderman, William & Syer, Katherine R. (eds.) (2005) A Companion to Wagner's Parsifal, Rochester NY, Camden House, ISBN 1-57113-237-6.
- Laurson, Jens F. "Bayreuth after Wolfgang", Classical WETA 90.9 FM website, Monday 1 September 2008, accessed 19 December 2009
- Loomis, George "Das Liebesverbot, Glimmerglass Opera, Cooperstown", Financial Times, 14 August 2008, accessed 19 December 2009.
- Mack, Dietrich (1976) Der Bayreuther Inszenierungsstil 1876–1976, Munich, Prestel-Verlag, ISBN 3-7913-0047-4.
- Morgan, Simon (2005) Seen and Heard International Opera Review: Reviews of Die Feen, Music Web International, accessed 19 December 2009.
- Newman, Ernest (1949), The Wagner Operas (also known as Wagner Nights), Princeton, Princeton University Press, 1991 paperback edition, ISBN 0-691-02716-1 .
- The New York Times (1879) Untitled article, The New York Times, 23 December 1879, p. 4, accessed 12 February 2010.
- Palmer, Andrew (2005) booklet notes for CD recording of Rienzi, conducted by Edward Downes, Ponto PPO-1040.
- Sabor, Rudolph (1997) Richard Wagner: Der Ring des Nibelungen: a companion, London, Phaidon, ISBN 0-7148-3650-8.
- Skelton, Geoffrey "Bayreuth" in Grove Music Online, Oxford Music Online. Version dated 28 February 2002, accessed 20 December 2009.
- Sutcliffe, James Helme "In Review: from around the world: Berlin" Opera News, June 1992 accessed 12 February 2010.
- Syer, Katherine R. "Parsifal on Stage" in Kinderman & Syer (2005) pp. 277–338.
- Twain, Mark "Mark Twain at Bayreuth ", Chicago Daily Tribune, 6 December 1891, accessed 12 February 2010.
- Wagner, Cosima (trans. Geoffrey Skelton) (1978) Cosima Wagner's Diaries Volume I: 1869–1877, London, Collins, ISBN 0-00-216130-3.
- Watson, Derek (1981) Richard Wagner: a biography, New York, Schirmer Books, ISBN 0-02-872700-2.
