= Cosima Wagner =

German businesswoman; director of Bayreuth Festival (1837–1930)

Cosima Wagner Director of the Bayreuth Festival
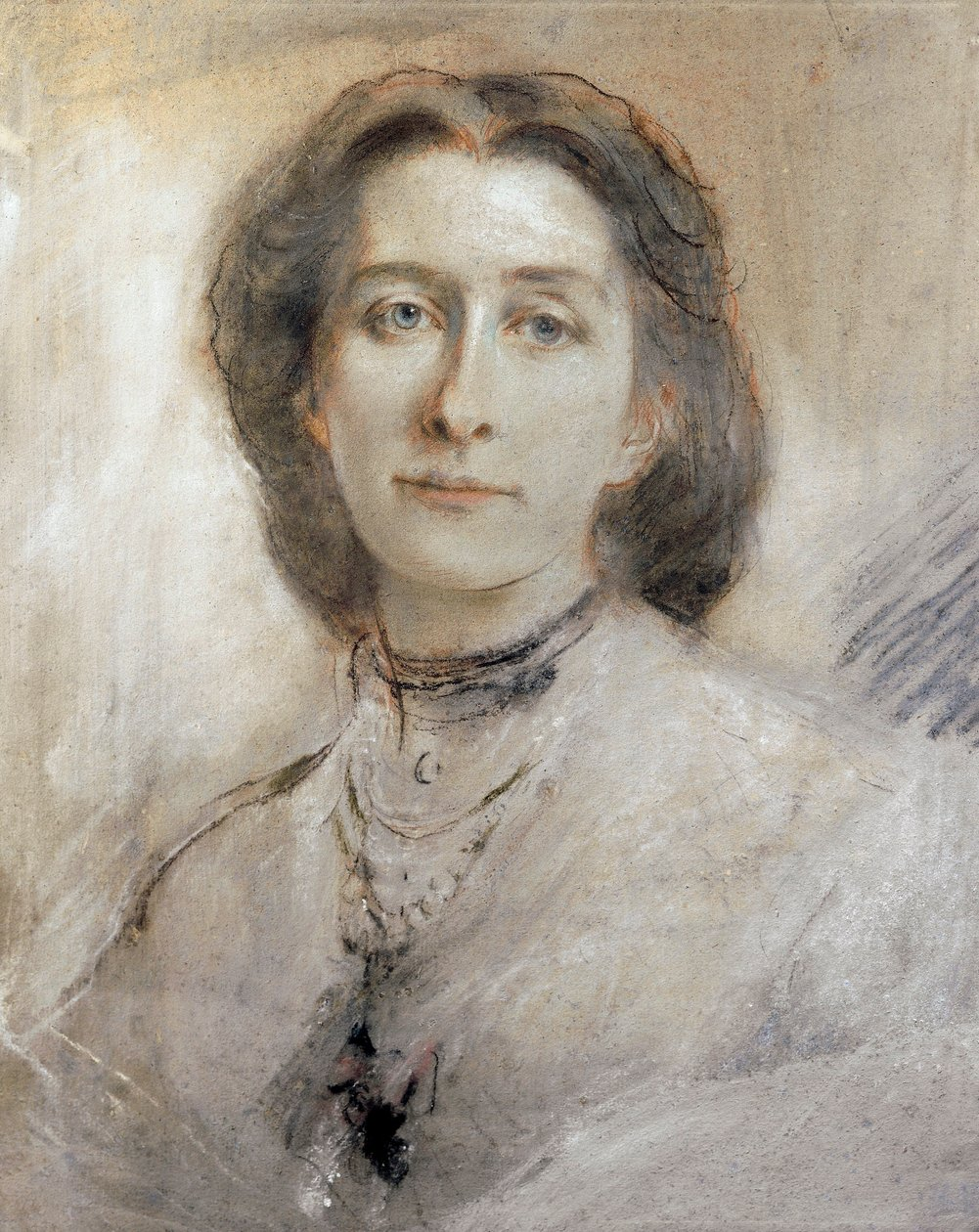
- Born: 24 December 1837; Bellagio
- Died: 1 April 1930 (aged 92); Bayreuth
- Spouses: Hans von Bülow; Richard Wagner
- Parents: Franz Liszt; Marie d'Agoult

Francesca Gaetana Cosima Wagner (née Liszt; 24 December 1837 – 1 April 1930) was a German businesswoman who was the daughter of the Hungarian composer and pianist Franz Liszt and Franco-German romantic author Marie d'Agoult. She became the second wife of the German composer Richard Wagner, and with him founded the Bayreuth Festival as a showcase for his stage works. After his death she devoted the rest of her life to the promotion of the festival and his music and philosophy. Commentators have recognised Cosima as the principal inspiration for Wagner's later works, particularly Parsifal.

In 1857, after a childhood largely spent under the care of her grandmother and with governesses, Cosima married the conductor Hans von Bülow. Although the marriage produced two children, it was largely a loveless union, and in 1863 Cosima began a relationship with Wagner, who was 24 years her senior. They married in 1870; after Wagner's death in 1883 she directed the Bayreuth Festival for more than 20 years, increasing its repertoire to form the Bayreuth canon of ten operas and establishing the festival as a major event in the world of musical theatre.

During her directorship, Cosima opposed theatrical innovations and adhered closely to Wagner's original productions of his works, an approach continued by her successors long after her retirement in 1907. Under her influence, Bayreuth became increasingly identified with antisemitism. This was a defining aspect of Bayreuth for decades, into the Nazi era which closely followed her death there in 1930. Thus, although she is widely perceived as the saviour of the festival, her legacy remains controversial.

== Family background and early childhood ==
Franz Liszt, depicted at the time of his affair with Marie d'Agoult

In January 1833 the 21-year-old Hungarian composer and pianist Franz Liszt met Marie d'Agoult, a Parisian socialite six years his senior. Marie had been married since 1827 to Charles, Comte d'Agoult, and had borne him two daughters, but the union had become sterile. Drawn together by their mutual intellectual interests, Marie and Liszt embarked on a passionate relationship. In March 1835 the couple fled Paris for Switzerland; ignoring the scandal they left in their wake, they settled in Geneva where, on 18 December, Marie gave birth to a daughter, Blandine-Rachel. (Note: Marie falsified the child's birth certificate, recording the mother as "Cathérine-Adelaide Meran", aged 24. A similar deception was employed two years later, when Cosima's mother was entered as "Caterina de Flavigny"; these steps were thought necessary to conceal Marie's adultery or perhaps, according to Liszt's biographer Derek Watson, to deny Charles d'Agoult any claim to the children.)

In the following two years Liszt and Marie travelled widely in pursuit of his career as a concert pianist. Late in 1837, when Marie was heavily pregnant with their second child, the couple were at Como in Italy. Here, on 24 December in a lakeside hotel in Bellagio, a second daughter was born. They named her Francesca Gaetana Cosima, the unusual third name being derived from St Cosmas, a patron saint of physicians and apothecaries; it was as "Cosima" that the child became known. With her sister she was left in the care of wet nurses (a common practice at the time), while Liszt and Marie continued to travel in Europe. Their third child and only son, Daniel, was born on 9 May 1839 in Venice.

In 1839, while Liszt continued his travels, Marie took the social risk of returning to Paris with her daughters. Her hopes of recovering her status in the city were dented when her influential mother, Madame de Flavigny, refused to acknowledge the children; Marie would not be accepted socially while her daughters were clearly in evidence. Liszt's solution was to remove the girls from Marie and place them with his mother, Anna Liszt, in her Paris home while Daniel remained with nurses in Venice. By this means, both Marie and Liszt could continue their independent lives. Relations between the couple cooled, and by 1841 they were seeing little of each other; it is likely that both engaged in other affairs. By 1845 the breach between them was such that they were communicating only through third parties. Liszt forbade contact between mother and daughters; Marie accused him of attempting to steal "the fruits of a mother's womb", while Liszt insisted on his sole right to decide the children's future. Marie threatened to fight him "like a lioness", but soon gave up the struggle. Though they were living in the same city, she did not see either of her daughters for five years, until 1850.

== Schooling and adolescence ==
Cosima and Blandine remained with Anna Liszt until 1850, joined eventually by Daniel. Cosima's biographer George Marek describes Anna as "a simple, uneducated, unworldly but warmhearted woman ... for the first time [the girls] experienced what it was to be touched by love". Of the sisters, Blandine was evidently the prettier; Cosima, with her long nose and wide mouth was described as an "ugly duckling". Although Liszt's relations with his children were formal and distant, he provided for them liberally, and ensured that they were well educated. Both girls were sent to Madame Bernard's, an exclusive boarding school, while Daniel was prepared for the prestigious Lycée Bonaparte.

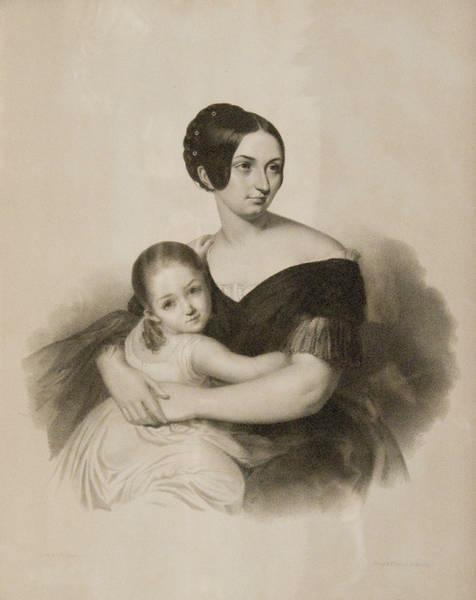
Princess Carolyne zu Sayn-Wittgenstein, seen here with her daughter Marie, exerted a powerful influence on Cosima's upbringing

In 1847 Liszt met Princess Carolyne zu Sayn-Wittgenstein, the estranged wife of a German prince who lived in Russia. By the autumn of 1848 she and Liszt had become lovers, and their relationship lasted for the remainder of his life. She quickly assumed responsibility for the management of Liszt's life, including the upbringing of his daughters. Early in 1850 Liszt had been disturbed to learn that Blandine and Cosima were seeing their mother again; his response, guided by the princess, was to remove them from their school and place them into the full-time care of Carolyne's old governess, the 72-year-old Madame Patersi de Fossombroni. Liszt's instructions were clear—Madame Patersi was to control every aspect of the girls' lives: "She alone is to decide what is to be permitted them and what forbidden".

Blandine and Cosima were subjected to the Patersi curriculum for four years. Cosima's biographer Oliver Hilmes likens the regime to that used for breaking in horses, though Marek describes it as exacting but ultimately beneficial to Cosima: "Above all, Patersi taught her how a 'noble lady' must behave, how to alight from a carriage, how to enter a drawing room, how to greet a duchess as against a commoner ... and how not to betray herself when she was hurt". On 10 October 1853 Liszt arrived at the Patersi apartment, his first visit to his daughters since 1845. With him were two fellow-composers: Hector Berlioz and Richard Wagner. Carolyne's daughter Marie, who was present, described Cosima's appearance as "in the worst phase of adolescence, tall and angular, sallow ... the image of her father. Only her long golden hair, of unusual sheen, was beautiful". After a family meal, Wagner read to the group from his text for the final act of what was to become Götterdämmerung. Cosima seems to have made little impression on him; in his memoirs he merely recorded that both girls were very shy.

== Marriage to Hans von Bülow ==
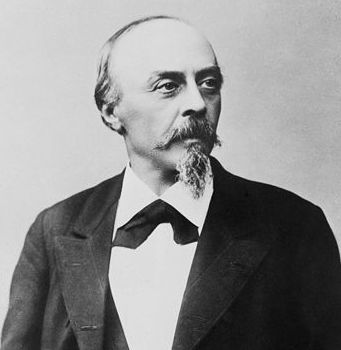
Hans von Bülow, photographed in middle age

As his daughters approached womanhood, Liszt felt that a change in their lives was called for and in 1855 he arranged (over their mother's bitter protests) for them to move to Berlin. Here they were placed in the care of Baroness Franziska von Bülow, member of the prominent Bülow family, whose son Hans was Liszt's most outstanding pupil; he would take charge of the girls' musical education while Frau von Bülow supervised their general and moral welfare. Hans von Bülow, born in 1830, had abandoned his legal education after hearing Liszt conduct the premiere of Wagner's Lohengrin at Weimar in August 1850, and had decided to dedicate his life to music. After a brief spell conducting in small opera houses, Bülow studied with Liszt, who was convinced that he would become a great concert pianist. Bülow was quickly impressed by Cosima's own skill as a pianist, in which he saw the stamp of her father, and the pair developed romantic feelings for each other. Liszt approved the match, and the marriage took place at St. Hedwig's Cathedral, Berlin, on 18 August 1857. During their honeymoon, along with Liszt they visited Wagner at his home near Zurich. This visit was repeated the following year, when Cosima, on taking her leave, shocked Wagner with an emotional demonstration: "[S]he fell at my feet, covered my hands with tears and kisses ... I pondered the mystery, without being able to solve it".

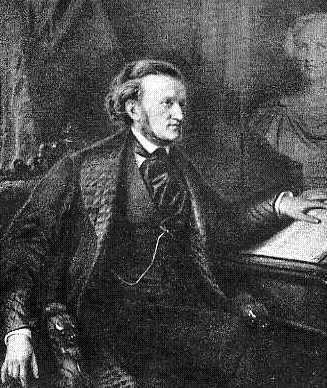
A portrait of Richard Wagner, around 1860. By 1863 he and Cosima were firmly committed to each other.

Cosima, a Parisian by upbringing, found it hard to adjust to life in Berlin, which was then a more provincial city than Paris. Her attempts to mix with local society, according to Marie zu Sayn-Wittgenstein, were handicapped by "[h]er exaggerated self-esteem and innate causticity", which alienated the men and women in her circle. At least initially, Cosima took an interest in her husband's career, encouraging him to extend his activities into composition. On one occasion she provided him with a scenario she had written for an opera based on the story of Merlin, court magician to King Arthur. However, nothing came of this project. Bülow's crowded professional schedule left Cosima alone for long periods, during which she worked for the French-language magazine Revue germanique as a translator and contributor. In December 1859 she was saddened by the death of her brother Daniel, at the age of twenty, after a long wasting illness. Cosima's first child, a daughter born on 12 October 1860, was named Daniela in Daniel's memory. A further, unexpected blow for Cosima fell in September 1862, when her sister Blandine, who had shared much of her upbringing, died in childbirth—she had been married to Émile Ollivier, a Parisian lawyer, since October 1857. Cosima's second daughter, born in March 1863, was named Blandine Elisabeth Veronica Theresia.

Bülow was committed to Wagner's music; in 1858 he had undertaken the preparation of a vocal score for Tristan und Isolde, and by 1862 he was making a fair copy of Die Meistersinger von Nürnberg. A social relationship developed, and during the summer of 1862 the Bülows stayed with Wagner at the composer's home at Biebrich. Wagner records that Cosima became "transfigured" by his rendering of "Wotan's Farewell" from Die Walküre. In October 1862, just after Blandine's death, Wagner and Bülow shared conducting duties at a concert in Leipzig; Wagner records that, during a rehearsal, "I felt utterly transported by the sight of Cosima ... she appeared to me as if stepping from another world". In these years Wagner's emotional life was in disarray. He was still married to his first wife, Minna Planer (she was to die in 1866), and was involved in several extramarital relationships. On 28 November 1863 Wagner visited Berlin; while Bülow was rehearsing a concert, Wagner and Cosima took a long cab ride through Berlin and declared their feelings for each other: "with tears and sobs", Wagner later wrote, "we sealed our confession to belong to each other alone".

== With Wagner ==
=== Munich and Tribschen ===
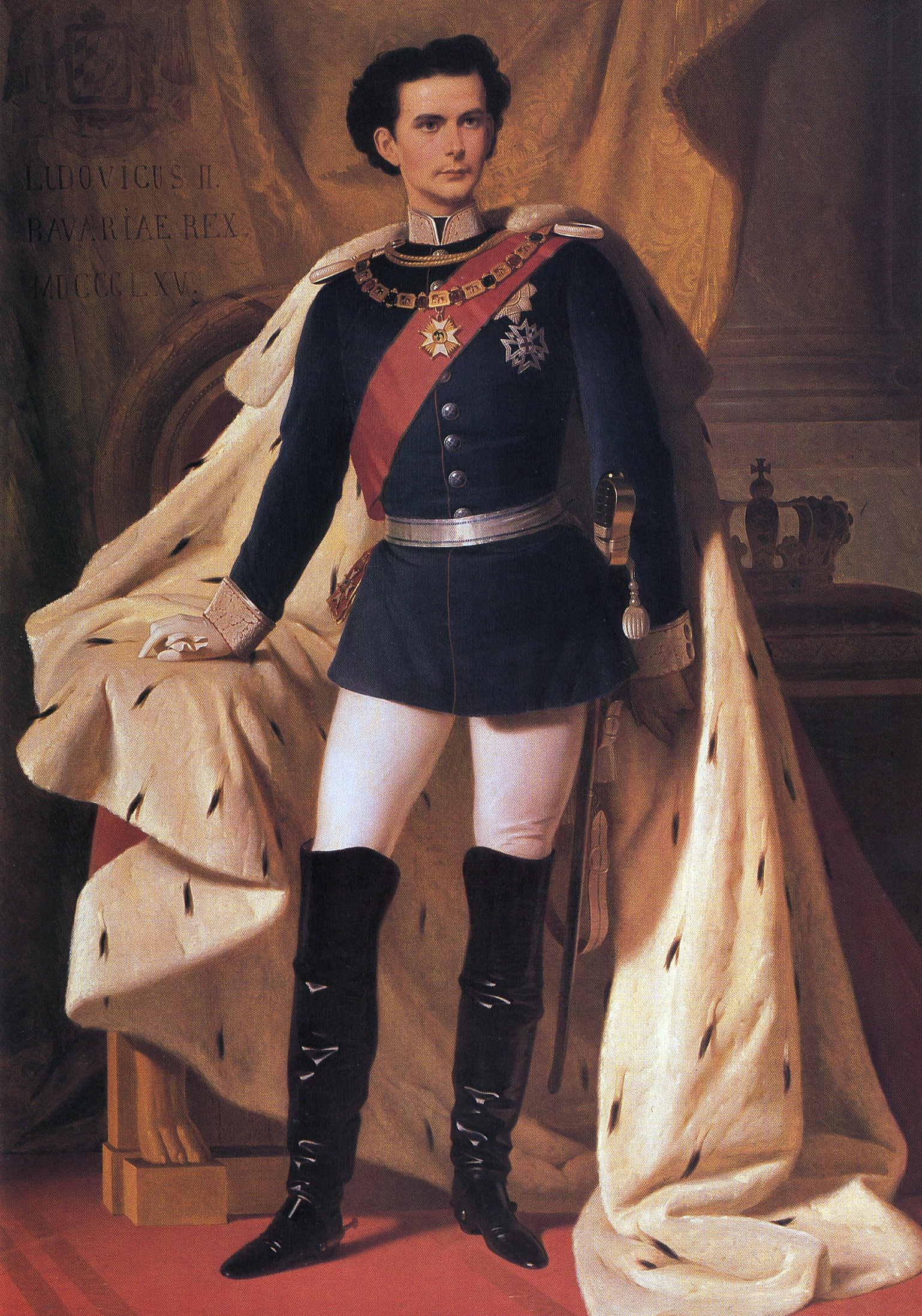
Ludwig II of Bavaria, Wagner's financial rescuer and sponsor for many years

In 1864 Wagner's financial position was transformed by his new patron, the 18-year-old King Ludwig II of Bavaria, who paid off the composer's debts and awarded him a generous annual stipend. Ludwig also provided Wagner with a lakeside retreat at Lake Starnberg, and a grand house in Munich. At Wagner's instigation, von Bülow accepted a post as Ludwig's "royal pianist"; he and Cosima moved to Munich, and took a house conveniently close to Wagner's, ostensibly so that Cosima could work as the composer's secretary. From 29 June 1864 Cosima spent more than a week alone with Wagner at Lake Starnberg, before von Bülow joined them on 7 July. According to Wagner's housekeeper, Anna Mrazek, "it was easy to tell that something was going on between Frau Cosima and Richard Wagner". Mrazek said that later in the visit von Bülow found his wife in Wagner's bedroom, but nevertheless made no demands for an explanation, either from Wagner or from his wife. Nine months after this visit, on 10 April 1865, Cosima gave birth to a daughter, Isolde. Such was von Bülow's devotion to Wagner that he accepted the child as his own, and registered her as "the legitimate daughter" of Hans and Cosima von Bülow. (Note: Wagner's biographer Robert W. Gutman suggests that von Bülow may genuinely have believed, or at least hoped, that the child was his, "until the passing of weeks saw the development of the unmistakeable domelike brow, aquiline nose, and protruding jaw".) Wagner attended the Catholic baptism on 24 April. On 10 June 1865, at the Munich Hofoper, von Bülow conducted the premiere of Wagner's Tristan und Isolde.

Wagner's role at Ludwig's court became controversial; in particular, Ludwig's habit of referring Wagner's policy ideas to his ministers alarmed the court. When Wagner demanded the sacking both of Ludwig's cabinet secretary and of his prime minister, there was a public outcry, and in December 1865 Ludwig reluctantly told Wagner to leave Bavaria. The king did not, however, withdraw his patronage or financial support. After a few months' wandering, in March 1866 Wagner arrived in Geneva, where Cosima joined him. They travelled together to Lucerne where they found a large lakeside house, the Villa Tribschen. Wagner made immediate arrangements to rent the house, at the king's expense, and by 15 April was installed in his new home.

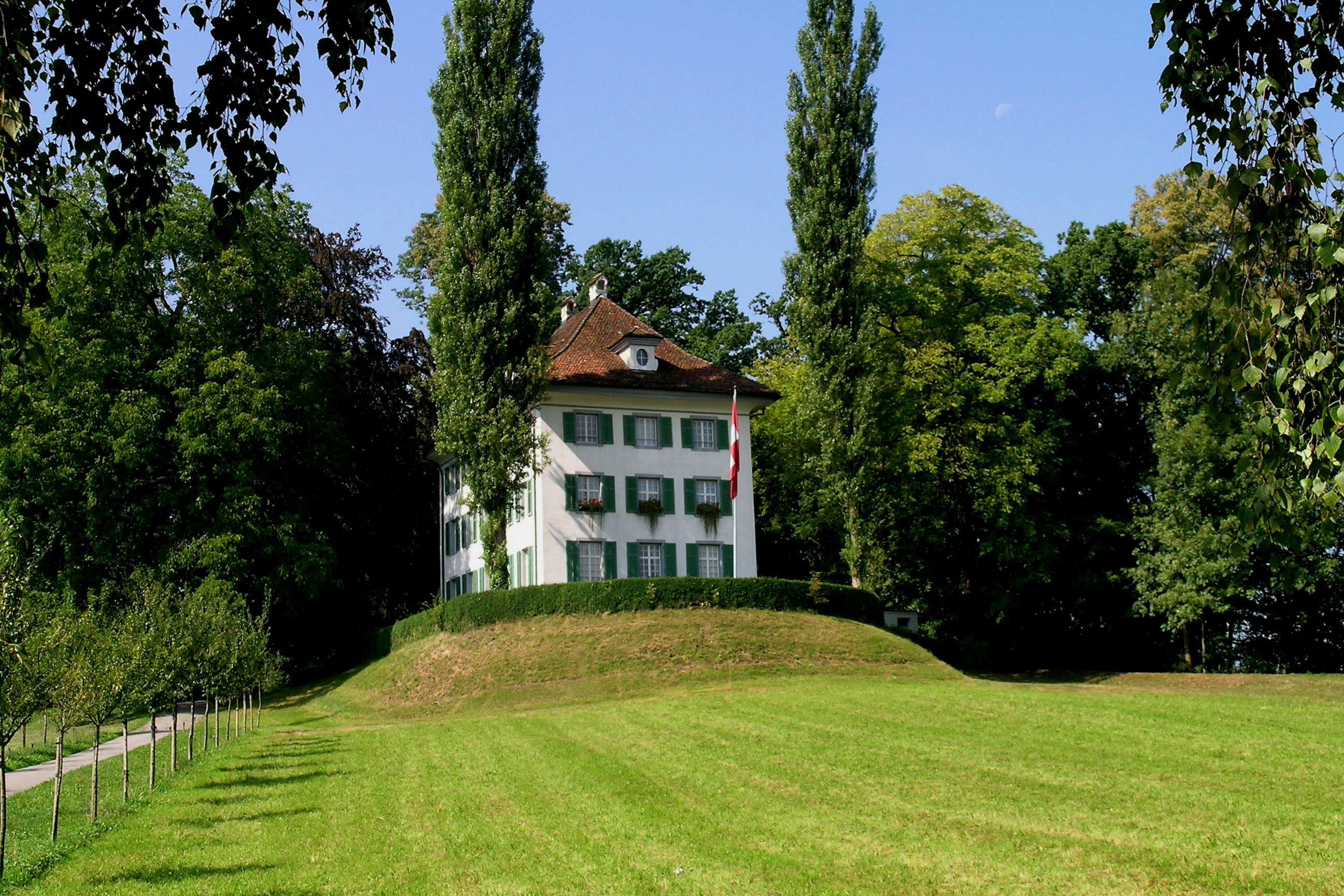
The Villa Tribschen, Wagner's home in Switzerland between 1866 and 1872

Immediately upon signing the lease, Wagner invited the von Bülows and their children to stay with him. They spent the summer there, returning briefly to Munich before von Bülow left for Basel while Cosima went back to Tribschen. By now von Bülow understood his wife's relationship with Wagner; he wrote to a friend that "since February 1865 I was in absolutely no doubt about the extremely peculiar nature of the situation". Wagner, anxious to avoid associating Cosima in a public scandal, deceived Ludwig into issuing a statement in June 1866 which declared the unbroken sanctity of the von Bülows' marriage, and promised retribution for those daring to suggest otherwise. By this time Cosima was pregnant with her second child by Wagner; a daughter, Eva, was born at Tribschen on 17 February 1867. Through all this, von Bülow retained his devotion to Wagner's music. He had been appointed music director of the Munich Hofoper, and threw himself into the preparations for the premiere of Die Meistersinger von Nürnberg. This took place on 21 June 1868 under his baton, and was a great success. Shortly afterwards, Cosima rejoined Wagner at Tribschen; Wagner explained to the king that she could not bear the insults to which she was continually subjected in Munich, and wished to escape from the world.

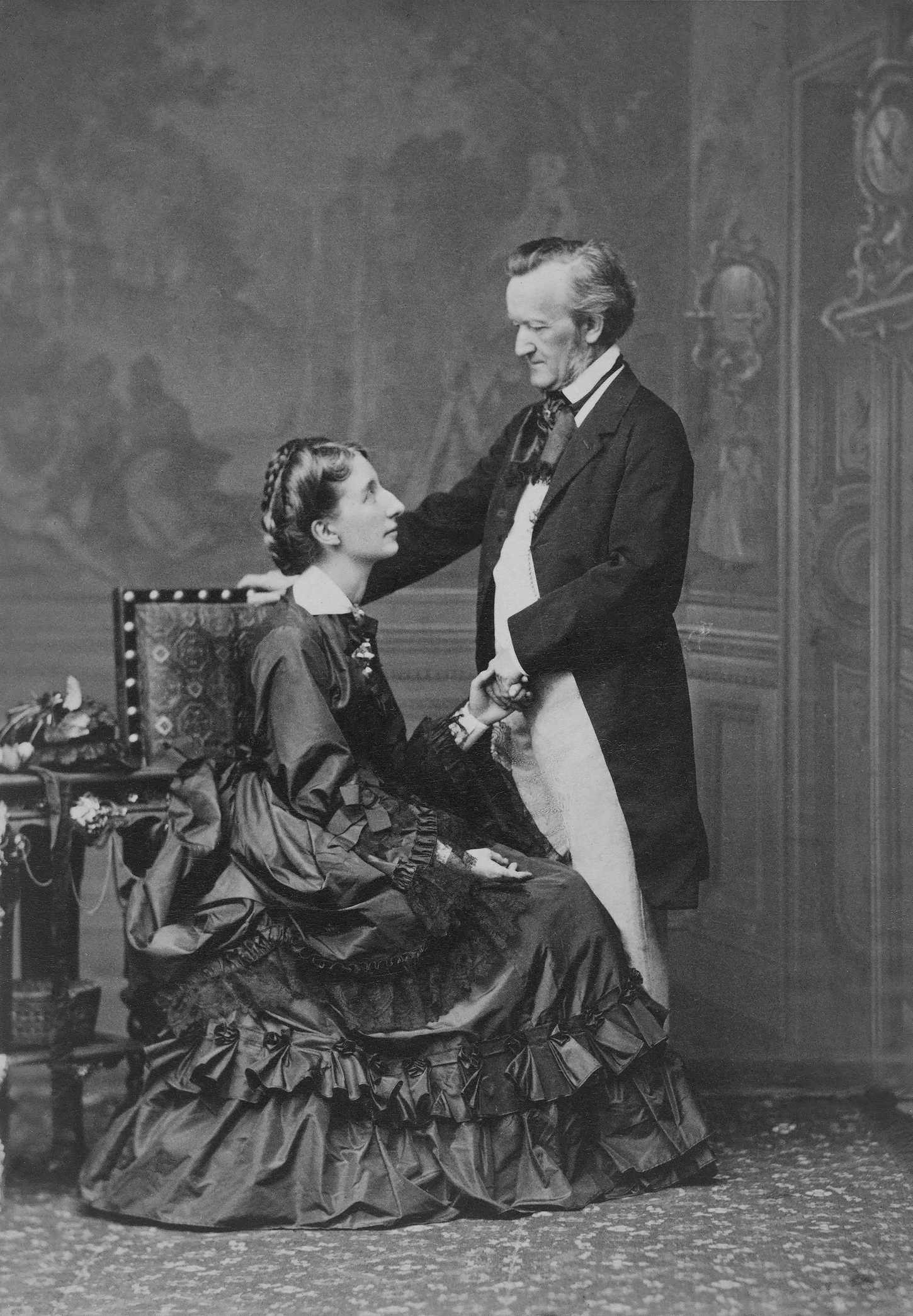
Richard and Cosima Wagner, photographed in 1872

In October 1868 Cosima asked her husband for a divorce, to which he would not initially agree. To sceptical enquirers he explained her absence from the von Bülow family home by a supposed visit to her half-sister in Versailles. In June 1869, immediately after the birth of her and Wagner's third and final child, Siegfried, Cosima wrote to von Bülow in what she called a "final attempt at an understanding". His reply was conciliatory; he wrote: "You have preferred to consecrate the treasures of your heart and mind to a higher being: far from censuring you for this step, I approve of it". Legal processes extended the marriage until 18 July 1870, when the divorce was finally sanctioned by a Berlin court. After the divorce von Bülow distanced himself from both Wagner and Cosima; he never again spoke to Wagner, and 11 years passed before his next meeting with Cosima.

Wagner and Cosima were married at Lucerne, on 25 August 1870, in a Protestant church. (Note: Wagner was by baptism a Lutheran; at the time of the wedding Cosima was still nominally a Catholic. She did not formally convert to Protestantism until October 1872.) Cosima's journal for that day records: "May I be worthy of bearing R's name!" Liszt was not informed in advance of the wedding, and learned of it first through the newspapers. The year ended on a high note for the Wagners: on 25 December, the day on which Cosima always celebrated her birthday although she had been born on the 24th, she awoke to the sounds of music. She commemorated the event in her journal: "... music was sounding, and what music! After it had died away, R ... put into my hands the score of his "Symphonic Birthday Greeting. ... R had set up his orchestra on the stairs, and thus consecrated our Tribschen forever!" This was the first performance of the music that became known as the Siegfried Idyll.

=== Bayreuth ===
==== Building the Festspielhaus ====
Wagner's deception over his relationship with Cosima had seriously damaged his standing with Ludwig. Matters were worsened by Ludwig's insistence, over Wagner's objections, that the premieres of the two completed Ring operas, Das Rheingold and Die Walküre, be given at once, in Munich, rather than as part of a complete Ring cycle on some future date at a venue of Wagner's choosing. To Wagner's mortification these premieres took place, under Franz Wüllner, on 22 September 1869 and 26 June 1870 respectively. The need for a theatre of his own, and full artistic control, was now clear to Wagner. On 5 March 1870 Cosima, according to her journal, advised him to "look up the article on Baireuth [sic] in the encyclopaedia". Wagner knew the town from a short visit he had made there in 1835; he was attracted to it by its central location and by its quiet non-fashionability. When he and Cosima visited in April 1871 they decided immediately that they would build their theatre there, and that the town would be their future home.

The Bayreuth Festspielhaus, as it appeared in the late 19th century

Wagner announced the first Bayreuth Festival for 1873, at which his full Ring cycle would be performed. Aware of the honour that such an event would bring to the town, the local council donated a large plot of land—the "Green Hill"—overlooking the town, as a site for the theatre. Since Ludwig had declined to finance the project, the start of building was delayed and the proposed date for the initial festival was deferred. By the spring of 1873 only a third of the required funds had been raised; further pleas to Ludwig were initially ignored, but early in 1874, with the entire project on the verge of collapse, the king relented and provided a loan. The full building programme included a handsome villa, "Wahnfried", into which Wagner, with Cosima and the children, moved from their temporary accommodation on 18 April 1874. The theatre was completed in 1875, and the festival scheduled for the following year. Commenting on the struggle to finish the building Wagner remarked to Cosima: "Each stone is red with my blood and yours".

During this period Cosima admitted to Liszt, who had taken minor orders in the Catholic Church, that she intended to convert to Protestantism. Her motive may have been more the desire to maintain solidarity with Wagner than from religious conviction; Hilmes maintains that at heart, "Cosima remained a pietistic Catholic until her dying day". On 31 October 1872 Cosima received her first Protestant sacrament alongside Wagner: "a deeply moving occasion ... what a lovely thing religion is! What other power could produce such feelings!"

==== First festival ====
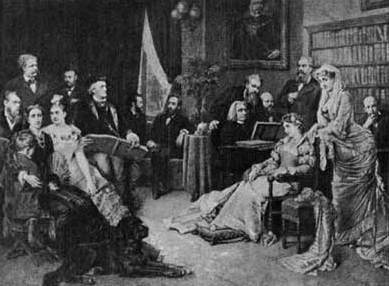
The Wagner family and guests, depicted at the first Bayreuth Festival. Cosima, her arm around Siegfried, is in the left foreground. Wagner is in the rear towards the left; Liszt, centre-right, is at the piano.

In March 1876, Cosima and Wagner were in Berlin when they learned that Marie d'Agoult had died in Paris. Unable to attend the funeral, Cosima expressed her feelings in a letter to her daughter Daniela: "There is nothing left for me to do, except to grieve for the woman that brought me into the world".

From June onwards, Cosima's journal entries consist almost entirely of comments on the forthcoming festival's rehearsals, sometimes warmly approving, often critical and anxious; for example, she found the costumes "reminiscent throughout of Red Indian chiefs ... all the marks of provincial tastelessness". From the beginning of August 1876 distinguished guests began to converge on the town; Ludwig, incognito, attended the final dress rehearsals between 6 and 9 August, but then left the town, reappearing in time to attend the final performances of the festival. Among other royal visitors were the German emperor Wilhelm I, Dom Pedro II of Brazil and an assortment of princes and grand dukes from the European royal families. Many of Europe's leading composers came: Bruckner, Tchaikovsky, Saint-Saëns, and Cosima's father, Liszt, who held court at Wahnfried among the notables who gathered there. Also in Bayreuth was Wagner's current mistress, Judith Gautier. It is unlikely that Cosima knew of the affair at this time, though she may have harboured a degree of suspicion. (Note: Cosima's journal indicates that Gautier remained a family friend until Wagner's death. Biographers have pointed to one entry, that for 12 February 1878, that might indicate that Cosima had discovered the secret letters exchanged between Gautier and Wagner, or that Wagner had confessed the affair. Cosima writes: "The grief that I was fearing has not passed me by; it has come upon me from outside.") Cosima's demeanour as the festival's hostess was described by a young American visitor in fulsome terms: "Mme Wagner is exceedingly gracious and affable ... a magnificent-looking woman, a perfect queen ..."

The festival began on 13 August and lasted until 30th. It consisted of three full Ring cycles, all under the baton of Hans Richter. (Note: Richter had endeared himself to Wagner by his refusal to conduct Ludwig's Munich performance of Das Rheingold in 1869. Bülow was never seriously considered as a Bayreuth conductor, and pursued his career elsewhere. In 1880 he became director of the Meiningen Court Orchestra, and subsequently championed the music of Brahms. He died in 1894.) At the end, critical reactions ranged between that of the Norwegian composer Edvard Grieg, who thought the entire work "divinely composed", and that of the French newspaper Le Figaro who called the music "the dream of a lunatic". Wagner himself was far from satisfied; in a letter to Ludwig he denounced the singers Albert Niemann and Franz Betz as "theatrical parasites" and complained that Richter had not got a single tempo correct. Months later, Cosima records, his attitude towards the productions was "Never again, never again!".

==== Parsifal ====
After the conclusion of the festival and the departure of the guests, Wagner and Cosima left with the children for Venice, where they remained until December. The festival had accumulated a large financial deficit; this, and Wagner's deep artistic dissatisfaction, precluded the possibility of any repeat in the near future. Wagner's mood was such that he seriously contemplated giving up the entire Bayreuth project; he was distracted from such thoughts by an invitation to conduct a series of concerts in London. Leaving the children behind, he and Cosima enjoyed a two-month break in England where, among others, Cosima met the novelist George Eliot, the poet Robert Browning, and the painter Edward Burne-Jones (who made a number of sketches of Cosima from which no finished painting emerged). On 17 May both Wagners were received by Queen Victoria at Windsor Castle. (Note: The queen described Wagner in her journal as "grown old and stout, [with] a clever, but not pleasing countenance". Two years later, in conversation with Cosima, Wagner referred to the queen as "a silly old frump for not abdicating, for she thereby condemns the Prince of Wales to an absurd life".)

Hermann Levi, who conducted the first performances of Parsifal

The English tour raised little money but restored Wagner's spirits. On his return he began work on what would prove to be his final stage work, Parsifal, a project that would occupy him for most of the next five years. Cosima's influence was such that Wagner asserted that he would not have written another note, had she not been there. On a practical level, when the festival's creditors began to press for payment, Cosima's personal plea to Ludwig in 1878 persuaded the king to provide a loan to pay off the outstanding debt and open the door to the prospect of a second Bayreuth Festival. For Cosima's birthday on 25 December 1878, Wagner hired an orchestra to play the newly composed prelude to Parsifal. The concert also included the Siegfried Idyll; Cosima wrote afterwards: "There stands he who has called forth these wonders, and he loves me. He loves me!".

Progress on Parsifal was hampered by Wagner's recurrent ill-health, but by late 1880 he announced the next festival for 1882, to be devoted entirely to the new work. Wagner secured Ludwig's agreement that Parsifal should be staged exclusively at Bayreuth, but in return, Ludwig required that his current Munich Kapellmeister, Hermann Levi, should conduct the festival. Wagner objected on the grounds of Levi's Jewish faith; Parsifal, he maintained, was a "Christian" opera. Both he and Cosima were vehement anti-Semites; Hilmes conjectures that Cosima inherited this in her youth, from her father, from Carolyne zu Sayn-Wittgenstein, probably from Madame Patersi and, a little later, from Bülow, "an anti-Semite of the first order". Thus Cosima's anti-Semitism predates her association with Wagner, although Marek observes that he nurtured it in her, to the extent that derogatory references to Jews occur, on average, on every fourth page of her 5,000-page journal. The musicologist Eric Werner argues that Wagner's anti-Semitism derived in part from his initial revolutionary philosophy; as a disciple of Proudhon he saw Jewry as "the embodiment of possession, of monopoly capitalism". Cosima's had no such basis, and whereas Wagner retained an ability to revise his views on the basis of his experiences, Cosima's anti-Semitism was visceral and remained unchanged. Cosima records Levi's astonishment on being informed of his appointment. Ludwig was insistent that, despite Wagner's objections, the appointment would stand. Levi would subsequently establish himself as the supreme conductor of the work, held by critical opinion to be "beyond praise".

At the second Bayreuth Festival Parsifal was performed 16 times; at the last performance on 29 August, Wagner himself conducted the final scene. Cosima wrote afterwards of how different the orchestra and singers sounded under Wagner. Overall, she and Wagner were entirely satisfied with the outcome of the festival which, unlike its predecessor, had made a handsome profit: "[N]ot once did the spirit of toil and dedication on the part of the artists abate ... I believe one may be satisfied". One dissident voice was that of Friedrich Nietzsche, once a devoted friend of Wagner's but latterly a harsh critic. Nietzsche considered Parsifal an abomination for which Cosima was responsible; she had corrupted Wagner.

=== Venice and widowhood ===
Palazzo Vendramin Calergi, Venice, where Wagner died on 13 February 1883

At the conclusion of the festival the Wagner family departed for an extended stay in Venice. To accommodate the large party of children, servants and expected guests they took a spacious apartment in the Palazzo Vendramin Calergi, overlooking the Grand Canal. The principal concern during the autumn and winter months was Wagner's declining health; his heart spasms had become so frequent that on 16 November 1882 Cosima recorded: "Today he did not have a spasm!". Cosima's journal entry for 12 February 1883—the last she was to make—records Wagner reading Fouqué's novel Undine, and playing the Rhinemaidens' lament from Das Rheingold on the piano. However, it has been alleged that an underlying cause of domestic friction may have surfaced concerning Carrie Pringle, an English soprano from the Parsifal cast who may have been rumoured to be having an affair with Wagner. According to Isolde, recalling the occasion much later, the Pringle suspicions led to a furious row between Cosima and Wagner on the morning of 13 February. There is no evidence of an affair between Wagner and Pringle, nor is Isolde's story of a row supported by any other testimony. At around noon on that day, Wagner suffered a fatal heart attack, and he died in the middle of the afternoon.

Cosima sat with Wagner's body for more than 24 hours, refusing all refreshment or respite. (Note: Jonathan Carr, the Wagner family's biographer, suggests that the accepted accounts of the 24 hours following Wagner's death may have been exaggerated or dramatised. He bases this view on "a rather precise letter given to Liszt a week later by Paul von Joukowsky, the Bayreuth stage designer".) During the embalming process, which occupied the next two days, Cosima sat with the body as often as possible, to the dismay of her children. She also asked her daughters to cut her hair, which was then sewn into a cushion and placed on Wagner's breast. On 16 February the journey back to Bayreuth began, and on Sunday 18 February the cortège processed to Wahnfried, where, following a brief service, Wagner was buried in the garden. Cosima remained in the house until the ceremonies were over; according to her daughter Daniela she then went to the grave "and for a long time lay down on the coffin until Fidi (Siegfried) went to fetch her". Afterwards she went into seclusion for many months, barely even seeing her children, with whom she communicated mainly through written notes. Among many messages, she received a telegram from Bülow: "Soeur il faut vivre" ("Sister, it is necessary to live").

== Mistress of Bayreuth ==
=== Interregnum ===
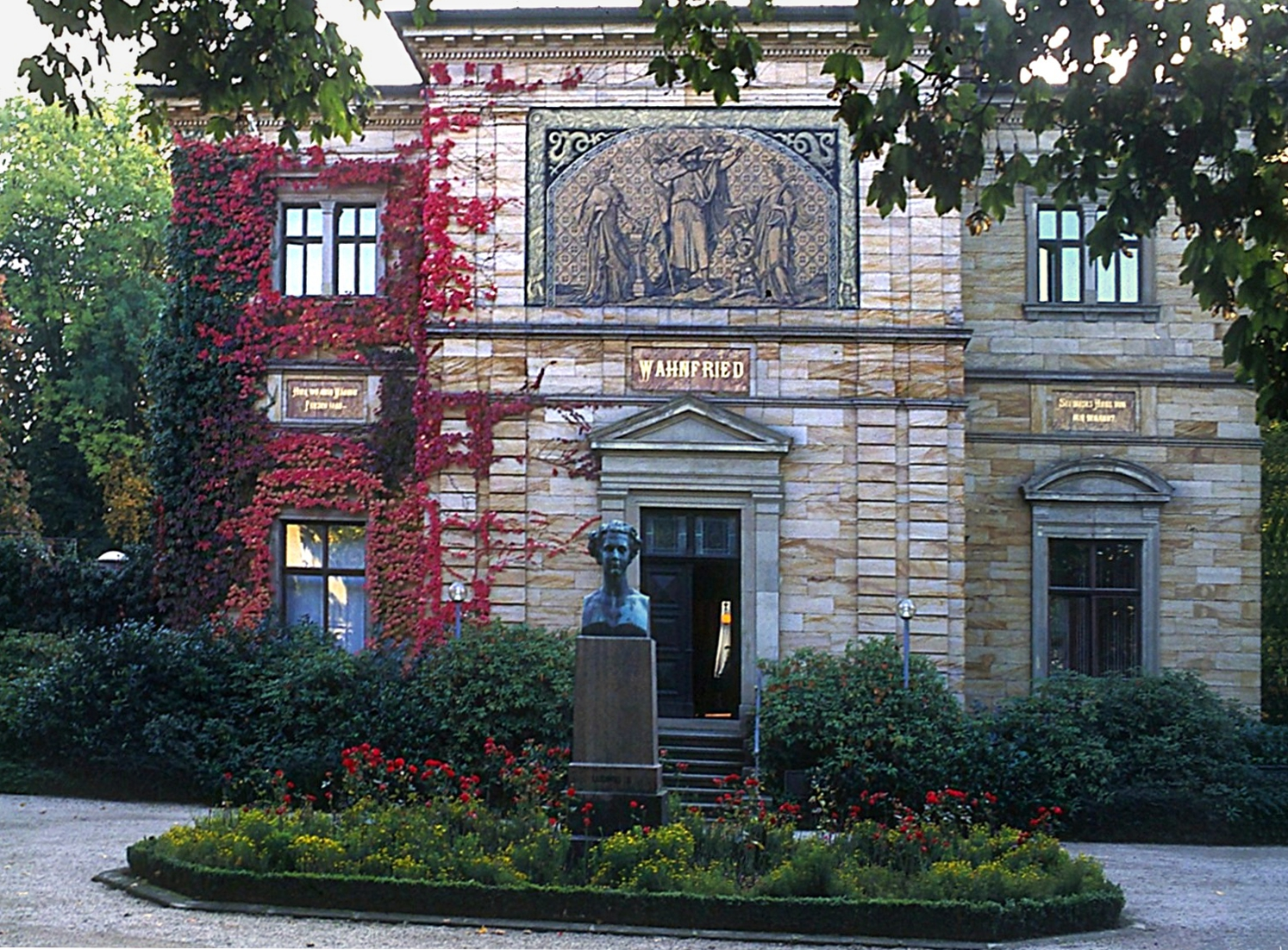
Wahnfried, where Cosima remained in seclusion in the months following Wagner's death

Wagner had left neither a will, nor instruction on the management of the Bayreuth Festival after his death. He had written of the future: "I ... cannot think of a single person who could say what I believe needs to be said ... there is practically no one on whose judgement I could rely". The festival's uncertain outlook was aggravated by Cosima's total withdrawal from all contact except that of her daughters and her friend and adviser Adolf von Groß. Without Cosima's participation the 1883 festival, as planned by Wagner—12 performances of Parsifal—went ahead, with Emil Scaria (who sang the role of Gurnemanz in the opera) doubling as artistic director. The cast was largely that of 1882, and Levi remained as conductor.

At the conclusion of the festival Cosima received a long, critical memorandum from an unknown observer, which highlighted numerous divergences from Wagner's directions. This, says Marek, proved to be a critical factor in determining her future life's mission: the maintenance of Wagner's heritage creations through the preservation of his interpretations. In her seclusion, Cosima learned of an abortive plan masterminded by Julius Kniese, the festival's chorus-master, by which Liszt was to assume the role of music director and Bülow would be chief conductor. Neither Liszt nor Bülow was interested in this arrangement, and the plan died. With Groß's assistance, Cosima pre-empted any further attempts by outsiders to assume control of the Wagner legacy, by obtaining legal recognition of herself and Siegfried as sole heirs to all Wagner's property, physical and intellectual. By this means she secured an unassailable advantage over any other claim on direction of the festival's future.

=== In control ===
In 1885 Cosima announced that she would direct the 1886 festival. Her tenure as Bayreuth's director lasted for 22 years, until 1907. During that time she oversaw 13 festivals, and by gradually increasing the repertory established the "Bayreuth canon" of ten mature Wagner works. Her triumvirate of conductors—Levi, Richter and Felix Mottl—shared the musical direction until 1894, when Levi left. Richter and Mottl served throughout Cosima's years, joined by several of the leading conductors of the day, although Bülow resisted all offers to participate. In the course of her long stewardship Cosima overcame the misgivings of the hardline Wagnerites patrons who believed that Wagner's works should not be entrusted to a non-German. Under her watch the festival moved from an uncertain financial basis into a prosperous business undertaking that brought great riches to the Wagner family.

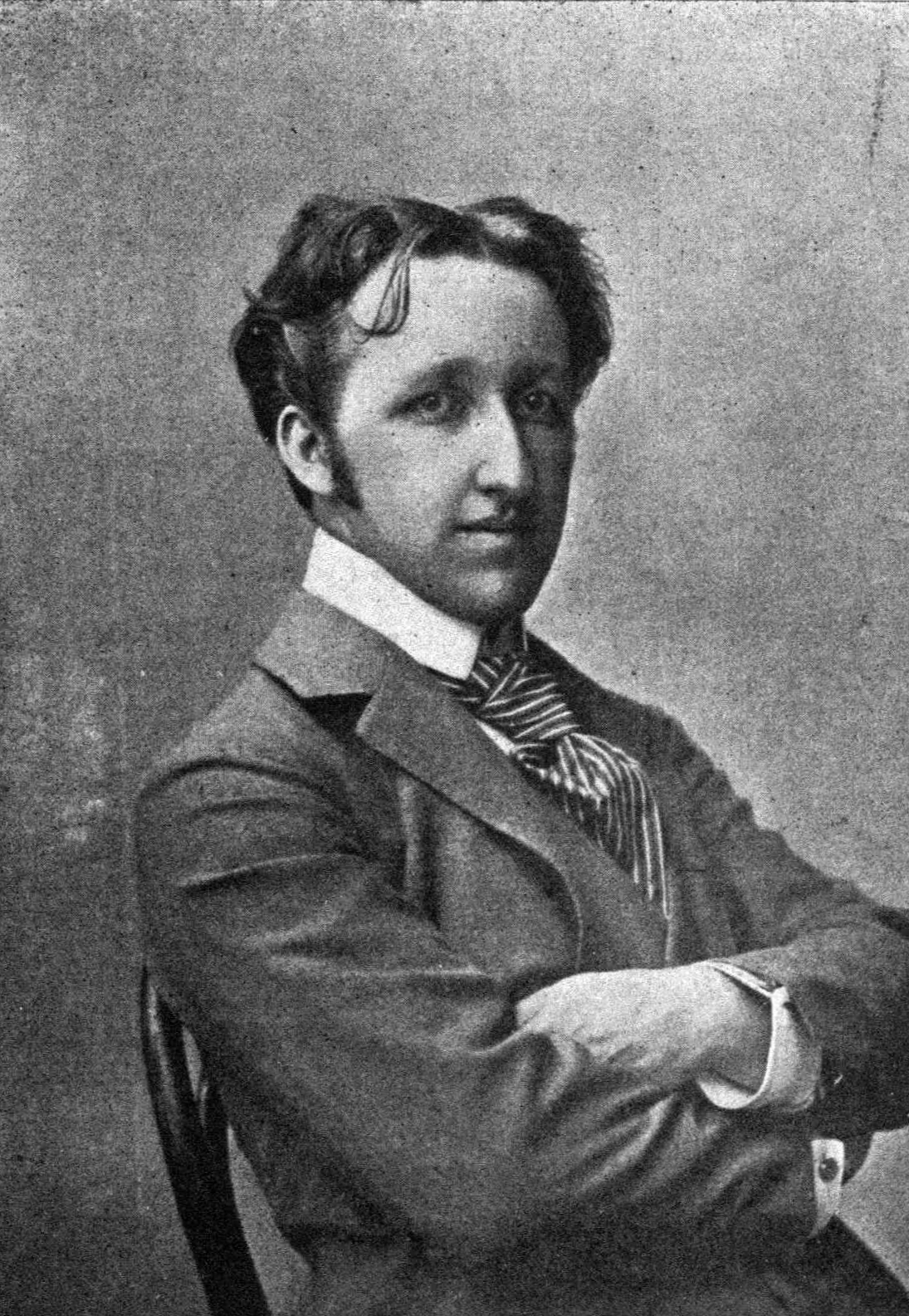
Siegfried Wagner, Cosima's son and eventual successor as festival director, made his Bayreuth conducting debut in 1896

Although the festival's historian, Frederic Spotts, suggests that Cosima was more creative than she affected to be, the primary purpose of all her productions was to follow the instructions and reflect the wishes of the Master: "There is nothing left for us here to create, but only to perfect in detail". This policy incurred criticism, among others from Bernard Shaw, who in 1889 mocked Cosima as the "chief remembrancer". Shaw scorned the idea that Wagner's wishes were best represented by the slavish copying in perpetuity of the performances he had witnessed. Ten years later Shaw highlighted as a feature of the "Bayreuth style" the "intolerably old-fashioned tradition of half rhetorical, half historical-pictorial attitudes and gestures", and the characteristic singing, "sometime tolerable, sometimes abominable". The subordination of the music to text, diction and character portrayal was a specific feature of the Bayreuth style; Cosima, according to Spotts, turned the principle of clear enunciation into "a fetish ... The resulting harsh declamatory style came to be derided as ... the infamous Bayreuth bark".

Parsifal was shown alongside other works at each of Cosima's festivals except for 1896, which was devoted to a revival of the Ring cycle. In 1886, her first year in charge, she added Tristan und Isolde to the canon. Amid the bustle of the festival Cosima refused to be distracted by the illness of her father, Liszt, who collapsed after attending a performance of Tristan and died several days later. Cosima supervised her father's funeral service and burial arrangements, but refused a memorial concert or any overt display of remembrance. According to Liszt's pupil Felix Weingartner, "Liszt's passing was not of sufficient importance to dim the glory of the Festival, even for a moment".

Die Meistersinger was added in 1888, Tannhäuser in 1891, Lohengrin in 1894 and Der fliegende Holländer in 1901. After the 1894 festival Levi resigned, the years of working in an anti-Semitic ambience having finally had their effect. At the 1896 festival Siegfried made his Bayreuth conducting debut in one of the five Ring cycles; he remained one of Bayreuth's regular conductors for the remainder of Cosima's tenure.

A caricature of Wagner, towards the end of her time in charge at Bayreuth

In common with Wagner, Cosima was willing to shelve her anti-Semitic prejudices in the interests of Bayreuth, to the extent of continuing to employ Levi for whom she developed considerable artistic respect. However, she frequently undermined him behind his back in private letters, and allowed her children to mimic and mock him. Cosima expressed to Weingartner the view that "between Aryan and Semite blood there could exist no bond whatever". In accordance with this doctrine, she would not invite Gustav Mahler (born Jewish though a convert to Catholicism) to conduct at Bayreuth, although she frequently took his advice over artistic matters.

Cosima was determined to preserve Bayreuth's exclusive right, acknowledged by Ludwig, to perform Parsifal. After Ludwig's death in 1886 this right was briefly challenged by his successor, an attempt swiftly defeated by Cosima with the help of Groß. A more serious threat arose from the German copyright laws, which only protected works for 30 years following the creator's death; thus Parsifal would lose its protection in 1913 regardless of any agreement with the Bavarian court. In anticipation, in 1901 Cosima sought to have the period of copyright protection extended by law to 50 years. She lobbied members of the Reichstag tirelessly, and was assured by Kaiser Wilhelm II of his support. These efforts failed to bring about any change in the law. In 1903, taking advantage of the lack of a copyright agreement between the United States and Germany, Heinrich Conried of the New York Metropolitan Opera announced that he would stage Parsifal later that year. Cosima was enraged, and with the assistance of Gilbert Ray Hawes filed suit against the company. Her efforts were to no avail; the first of 11 performances took place on 24 December 1903. The enterprise was a popular and critical success, though in Cosima's view it was a "rape"; her hostility towards the Metropolitan lasted for the remainder of her life.

By the beginning of the new century three of Cosima's daughters had married: Blandina to Count Biagio Gravina in the closing days of the 1882 festival, Daniela to Henry Thode, an art historian, on 3 July 1886, and Isolde, Cosima's first child by Wagner, who married a young conductor, Franz Beidler, on 20 December 1900. The youngest daughter, Eva, rejected numerous suitors to remain her mother's secretary and companion for the rest of Cosima's tenure.

=== Transfer of power ===
On 8 December 1906, having directed that year's festival, Cosima suffered an Adams-Stokes seizure (a form of heart attack) while visiting her friend Prince Hohenlohe at Langenburg. By May 1907 it was clear that her health was such that she could no longer remain in charge at Bayreuth; this responsibility now passed to Siegfried, her long-designated heir. The succession was accomplished against a background of family disagreement; Beidler thought that he had rights, based partly on his greater conducting experience and also because he and Isolde had produced Wagner's only grandchild, a son born in October 1901, who could establish a dynastic succession. Beidler's claims were dismissed by Cosima and by Siegfried; he never conducted at Bayreuth again, and the rift between the Beidlers and Cosima developed in due course into a major family feud.

== Retirement, decline and death ==
Cosima moved into rooms to the rear of Wahnfried, away from the house's daily bustle, where she passed her days surrounded by Wagner's possessions and numerous family portraits. Although at first Siegfried discussed his festival plans with her, she avoided the Festspielhaus, content to read reports of the productions. Siegfried made few changes to the production traditions set by Wagner and Cosima; Spotts records that "whatever had been laid down by his parents was preserved unchanged out of a sense of strict filial duty". Only in matters on which they had not spoken was he prepared to exercise his own judgement. As a result, the original Parsifal sets remained in use even when they were visibly crumbling; the view of Cosima and her daughters was that no changes should ever be made to stage sets "on which the eye of the Master had rested".

In December 1908 Eva, then 41, married Houston Stewart Chamberlain, a British-born historian who had adopted as his personal creed a fanatical form of German nationalism based on principles of extreme racial and cultural purity. He had known Cosima since 1888, though his affinity with Wagner extended back to 1882, when he had attended the premiere of Parsifal. He had successively courted Blandina and then Isolde, before settling on Eva. Cosima had considerable empathy with his theories; according to Carr "she came to love him as her son—perhaps even more". Chamberlain became the dominant figure within the Wagner circle, and was largely responsible for the increasing alienation of the Beidlers. Cosima may have been unaware of Isolde's attempts at rapprochement, because Eva and Chamberlain withheld Isolde's letters. In 1913 Isolde was effectively disinherited when she sought to confirm her rights as a co-heir to the considerable Wagner fortunes in a court case, which she lost. (Note: Under German law, Isolde was Bülow's daughter, having been born when Cosima was still married to her first husband. Wagner had never formally acknowledged parentage.) After this she withdrew, and to the time of her death in 1919 never again saw or communicated directly with Cosima.

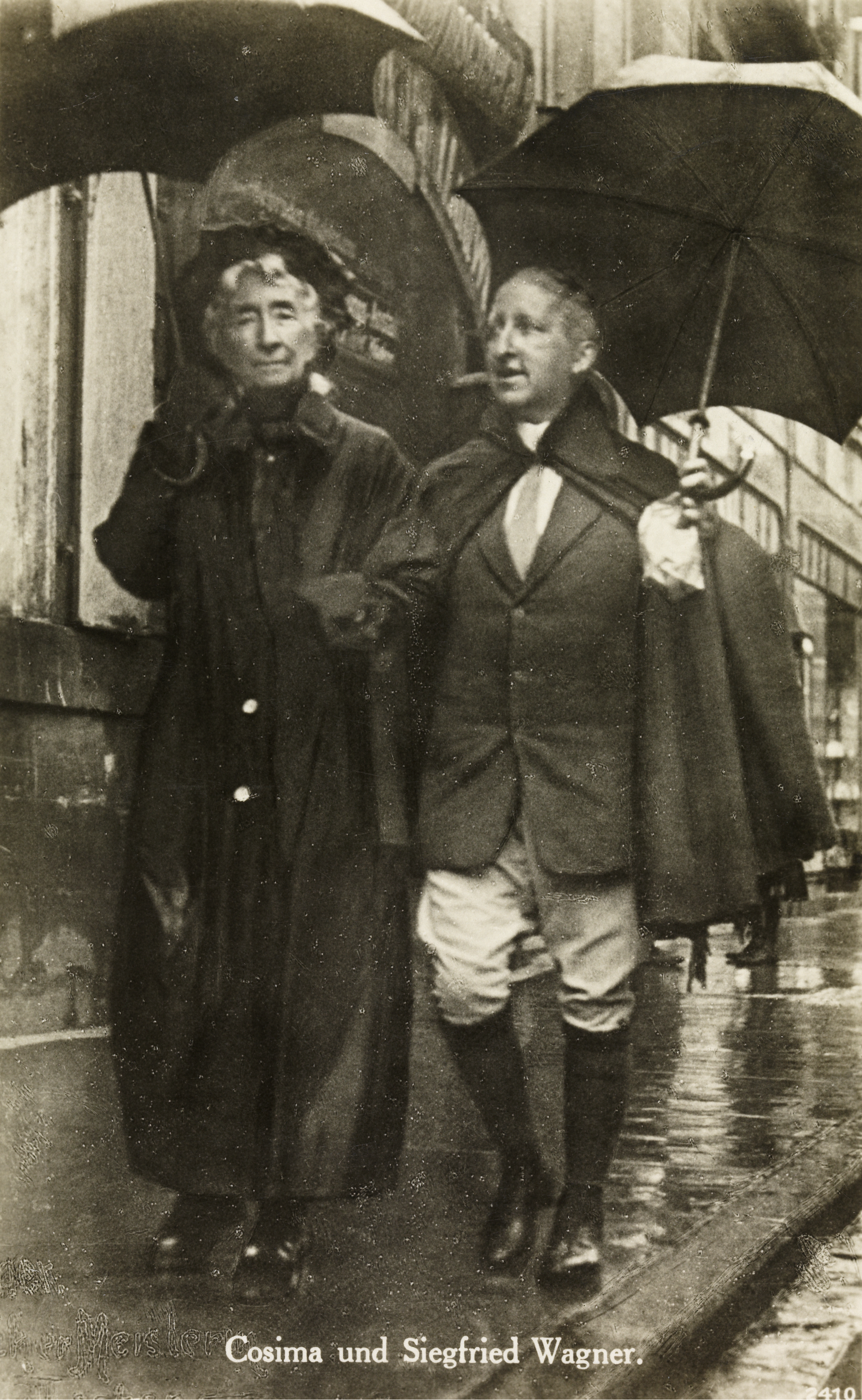
Cosima and Siegfried Wagner, c. 1929

A happier family event from Cosima's standpoint was Siegfried's marriage in 1915, at the age of 46, to Winifred Williams, the 18-year-old foster-daughter of Karl Klindworth who had been friends with both Wagner and Liszt. When the couple's first son, Wieland, was born on 5 January 1917, Cosima celebrated by playing excerpts from the Siegfried Idyll on Wagner's piano.

The outbreak of the First World War curtailed the 1914 festival; the conflict and the political and economic upheavals that followed the war closed the Festspielhaus until 1924. Plans for the festival's resumption coincided with an upsurge in Germany of extreme nationalist politics. Adolf Hitler, a fervent Wagner admirer, first visited Wahnfried in 1923, and although he was not received by Cosima he befriended the family and was thereafter a regular visitor. The Chamberlains, together with Winifred, became enthusiastic members of the Nazi Party, and the 1924 festival became an overt rally for the party and its leading supporters. That year Cosima, then 86, ended her long absence from the theatre by attending the dress rehearsals for Parsifal, and watching the first act at the opening performance on 23 July. The tenor Lauritz Melchior remembered Siegfried returning from frequent visits to a small gallery above the stage and saying "Mama wants..."

By 1927, the year of her 90th birthday, Cosima's health was failing. The birthday was marked in Bayreuth by the naming of a street in her honour, although she was unaware; the family thought that knowledge of the celebrations would overexcite her. In her last years she was virtually bedridden, became blind, and was lucid only at intervals. She died, aged 92, on 1 April 1930; after a funeral service at Wahnfried her body was taken to Coburg and cremated. In 1977, 47 years after her death, Cosima's urn was recovered from Coburg and buried alongside Wagner in the Wahnfried garden.

== Legacy ==
Cosima's life mission was total service to Wagner and his works; in the words of the music critic Eric Salzman she "submitted herself body and soul to the Master". In Wagner's lifetime she fulfilled this purpose primarily by recording in her journal every facet of his life and ideas. After his death the journal was abandoned; she would henceforth serve the master by perpetuating his artistic heritage through the Bayreuth Festival. Guided by Groß, but also using her own acumen—Werner calls her a "superb business woman"—she succeeded in making the festival first solvent, then profitable.

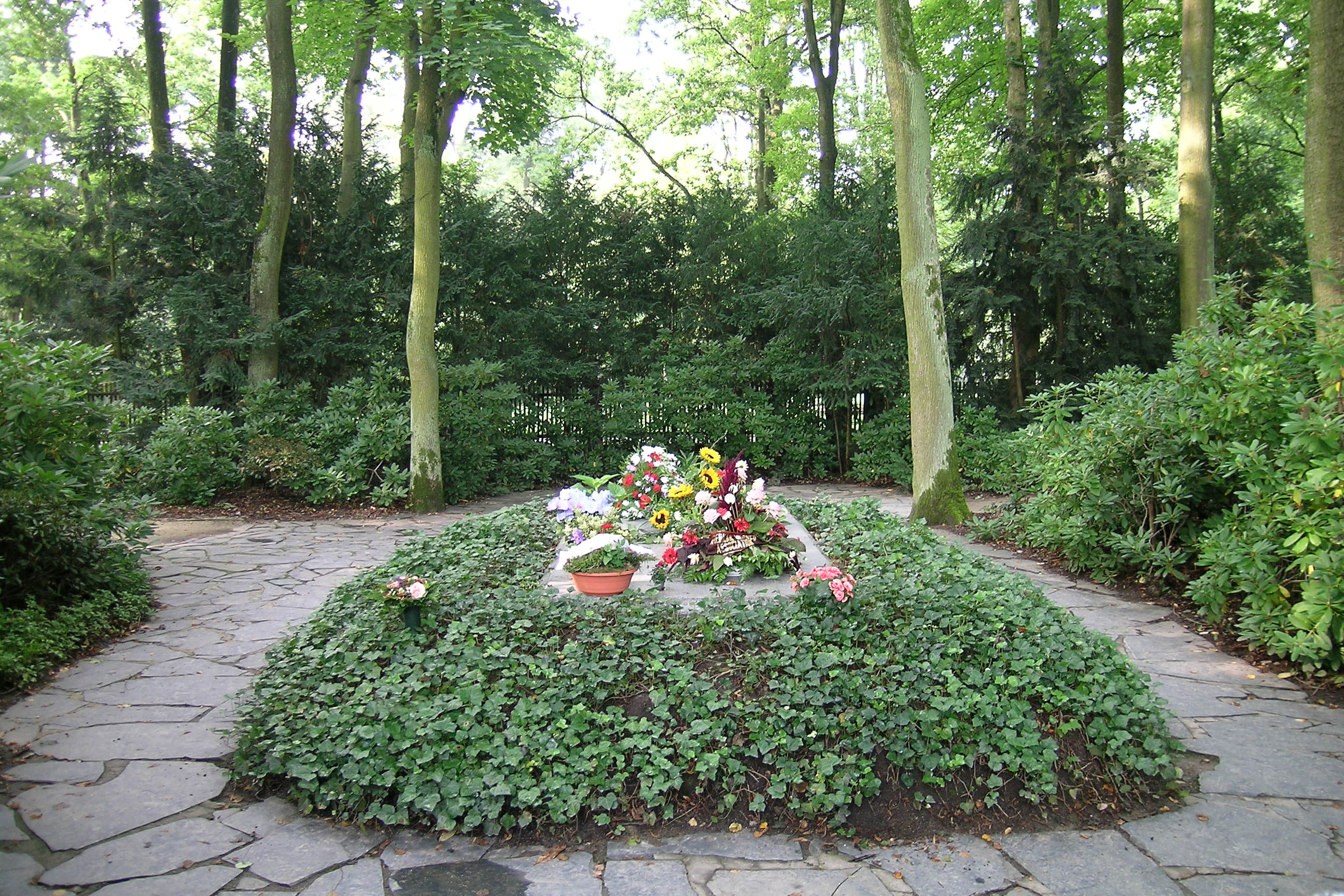
The Wagner grave in the Wahnfried garden, where in 1977 Cosima's ashes were placed alongside Wagner's body

While acknowledging that Cosima was an effective "keeper of the flame", commentators have criticised the nature of her legacy. The Ring historian J. K. Holman describes it as one of "stifling conservatism". Her policy of sticking to Wagner's original stage conceptions was not fully abandoned until after the Second World War, when a new generation took charge of the festival. Hilmes likens Cosima's role to that of the abbess of a religious community: "a cohesive, quasi-religious congregation of Bayreuthians sharing a common philosophical outlook". Anti-Semitism was integral to this philosophy; although in 1869 Cosima had opposed the re-publication of Wagner's anti-Jewish treatise Jewishness in Music, this was on grounds of commercial prudence rather than sensitivity. In 1881 she encouraged Wagner to write his essay "Know Thyself", and to include in it a tirade against Jewish assimilation.

The critic and one-time librettist Philip Hensher writes that "under the guidance of her repulsive racial-theorist son-in-law [Chamberlain] ... Cosima tried to turn Bayreuth into a centre for the cult of German purity." Thus, he continues, "By the time she died, Wagner's reputation was ... at the forefront of a terrible political dynamism: antique stagings of his works were presented to audiences of Brownshirts". The close association of the festival with Hitler and the Nazis during the 1930s was much more the work of Winifred—an overt Hitler supporter—than of Cosima, though Hensher asserts that "Cosima was as much to blame as anyone".

In the immediate aftermath of Cosima's death, some writers heaped copious praise on her. Ernest Newman, Wagner's biographer, called her "the greatest figure that ever came within [Wagner's] circle"; Richard Du Moulin-Eckart, Cosima's first biographer, introduced her as "the greatest woman of the century". In time judgements became more measured, and divided. Marek closes his account by emphasising her role not only as Wagner's protector but as his muse: "Without her there would have been no Siegfried Idyll, no Bayreuth, and no Parsifal". In Hensher's judgement, "Wagner was a genius, but also a fairly appalling human being. Cosima was just an appalling human being."

== Archives ==
Cosima Wagner's letters to Princess Alexandra of Saxe-Coburg and Gotha, written in 1896–1905, are preserved in the Hohenlohe Central Archive (Hohenlohe-Zentralarchiv Neuenstein), which is in Neuenstein Castle in the town of Neuenstein, Baden-Württemberg, Germany.

Cosima Wagner's diaries were published in Germany in 1976 and translated into English in 1978. They run to more than 4,000 pages. In his comment to the publisher appearing on the second volume's dust-jacket, the scholar George Steiner remarked that mining these texts for important detail contextualizing various significant historical events and phenomena was likely "to be a task that occupies generations of scholars."

== Bayreuth Festival performances under her ==
The symbol † indicates a work's Bayreuth premiere. Under Cosima Wagner Parsifal was performed 97 times, Tristan und Isolde 24, Die Meistersinger 22, Tannhäuser 21, Lohengrin 6, the Ring cycle 18 and Der fliegende Holländer 10.

Year	Works performed	No. of performances	Conductor
1886	Parsifal; Tristan und Isolde†	9; 8	Hermann Levi; Felix Mottl
1888	Parsifal; Die Meistersinger von Nürnberg†	9; 8	Felix Mottl; Hans Richter
1889	Parsifal; Tristan und Isolde; Die Meistersinger von Nürnberg	9; 4; 5	Hermann Levi; Felix Mottl; Hans Richter
1891	Parsifal; Tristan und Isolde; Tannhäuser†	10; 3; 7	Hermann Levi; Felix Mottl; Felix Mottl
1892	Parsifal; Tristan und Isolde; Die Meistersinger von Nürnberg; Tannhäuser	8; 4; 4; 4	Hermann Levi; Felix Mottl; Felix Mottl; Felix Mottl
1894	Parsifal; Tannhäuser; Lohengrin†	9; 5; 6	Hermann Levi; Richard Strauss; Felix Mottl
1896	Der Ring des Nibelungen (Ring cycle)	5	Felix Mottl; Hans Richter; Siegfried Wagner
1897	Parsifal; Der Ring des Nibelungen	8; 3	Felix Mottl, Anton Seidl; Hans Richter, Siegfried Wagner
1899	Parsifal; Der Ring des Nibelungen; Die Meistersinger von Nürnberg	7; 2; 5	Franz Fischer; Siegfried Wagner; Hans Richter
1901	Parsifal; Der Ring des Nibelungen; Der fliegende Holländer†	7; 2; 5	Karl Muck; Siegfried Wagner, Hans Richter; Felix Mottl
1902	Parsifal; Der Ring des Nibelungen; Der fliegende Holländer	7; 2; 5	Karl Muck; Siegfried Wagner, Hans Richter; Felix Mottl
1904	Parsifal; Der Ring des Nibelungen; Tannhäuser	7; 2; 5	Karl Muck, Michael Balling; Franz Beidler, Hans Richter; Siegfried Wagner
1906	Parsifal; Der Ring des Nibelungen; Tristan und Isolde	7; 2; 5	Michael Balling, Franz Beidler, Karl Muck; Siegfried Wagner, Hans Richter; Michael Balling, Felix Mottl

== Notes and references ==
=== Bibliography ===
- Carr, Jonathan (2008). The Wagner Clan. London: Faber and Faber. ISBN 978-0-571-20790-9.
- Du Moulin Eckart, Richard (1930). Cosima Wagner. New York: A. A. Knopf. OCLC 410838.
- Gutman, Robert W. (1971). Richard Wagner: The Man, His Mind and His Music. Harmondsworth, UK: Penguin Books. ISBN 978-0-14-021168-9.
- Heylbut, Rose; Gerber, Aimé (1977). Backstage at the Metropolitan Opera. New York City: Arno Press. ISBN 9780405096839.
- Hilmes, Oliver (2011). Cosima Wagner: The Lady of Bayreuth. New Haven and London: Yale University Press. ISBN 978-0-300-17090-0.
- Holman, J(ames) K(nox) (2001). Wagner's Ring: A Listener's Companion and Concordance. Portland: Amadeus Press. ISBN 978-1-57467-070-7.
- Marek, George R (1981). Cosima Wagner. London: Julia MacRae Books. ISBN 978-0-86203-120-6.
- Osborne, Charles (1992). The Complete Operas of Wagner. London: Victor Gollancz Ltd. ISBN 978-0-575-05380-9.
- Rose, Paul (1996). Wagner: Race and Revolution. London: Faber and Faber. ISBN 978-0-571-17888-9.
- Shaw, Bernard (1898). The Perfect Wagnerite. London: Grant Richards. OCLC 4815545.
- Skelton, Geoffrey, ed. (1994). Cosima Wagner's Diaries: an Abridgement. London: Pimlico Books. ISBN 978-0-7126-5952-9.
- Spencer, Stewart (2004). ""Er starb, – ein Mensch wie alle": Wagner and Carrie Pringle". In Emmerich, P. (ed.). Bayreuther Festspiele 2004. Parsifal. Tannhäuser. Der Ring des Nibelungen. Der fliegende Holländer. Bayreuth: Bayreuther Festspiele. pp. 72–85.
- Spotts, Frederic (1994). Bayreuth: A History of the Wagner Festival. New Haven and London: Yale University Press. ISBN 978-0-300-05777-5.
- Wagner, Richard (1983). My Life. Translated by Gray, Andrew. Cambridge UK: Cambridge University Press. ISBN 978-0-521-22929-6.
- Watson, Derek (1989). Liszt. The Master Musicians. London: J. M. Dent. ISBN 978-0-460-03174-5.
