= Frederic Spotts =

American historian (born 1930)

Frederic Spotts (born February 2, 1930) is an American former diplomat and cultural historian. He was educated in Swarthmore College, Fletcher School of Law and Diplomacy and Oxford University.

== Works ==
- Spotts, Frederic (1973). The Churches and Politics in Germany. Wesleyan University Press.
- Spotts, Frederic, and Wieser, Theodor (1986). Italy: a Difficult Democracy. Cambridge University Press. ISBN 978-0-521-30451-1 (With an Ettore Scola's cover Illustration).
- Spotts, Frederic (1994). Bayreuth: A History of the Wagner Festival. Yale University Press. ISBN 978-0-300-06665-4.
- Spotts, Frederic (2003). Hitler and the Power of Aesthetics. Pimlico. ISBN 978-0-7126-6788-3.
- Spotts, Frederic (2008). The Shameful Peace: How French Artists and Intellectuals Survived the Nazi Occupation. Yale University Press. ISBN 978-0-300-14237-2.
- Spotts, Frederic (2016). Cursed Legacy: The Tragic Life of Klaus Mann. Yale University Press. ISBN 978-0-300-22097-1.
