= Daniela von Bülow =

German pianist and costume designer (1860–1940)

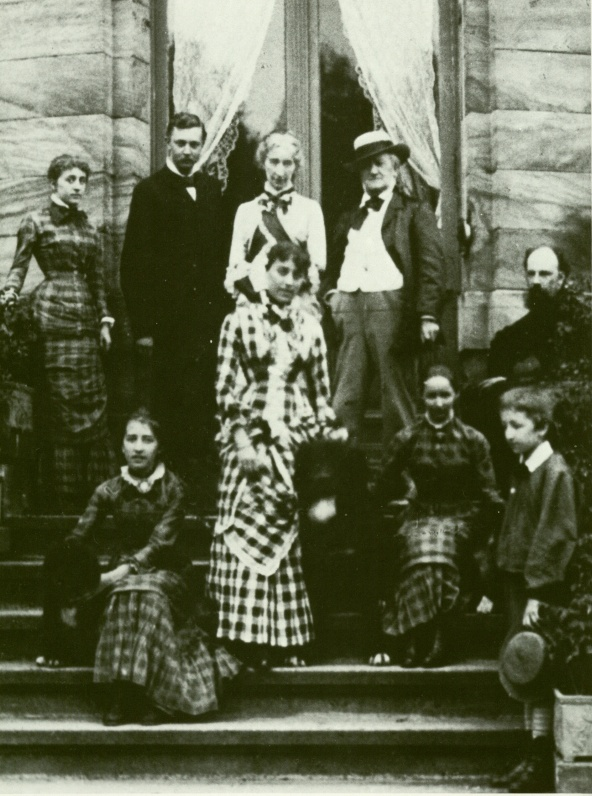
- Richard Wagner with his family and friends Heinrich von Stein (left) and Paul von Joukowsky (right) in front of Villa Wahnfried in Bayreuth. Daniela von Bülow is in the center, standing. Photograph dated 23 August 1881
- Born: Daniela Senta von Bülow Liszt; 12 October 1860; Berlin, Germany
- Died: 28 July 1940 (aged 79); Bayreuth, Germany
- Occupations: Pianist, costume designer
- Spouse: Henry Thode (m. 1886; div. 1914)
- Parents: Hans von Bülow (father); Cosima Liszt (mother)

Baroness Daniela von Bülow (12 October 1860 – 28 July 1940), nicknamed Loulou or Lusch, was a German pianist and costume designer.

== Biography ==
Born as Daniela Senta von Bülow Liszt on 12 October 1860 in Berlin, Germany, Daniela von Bülow was the first daughter of the conductor and pianist Hans von Bülow, and Cosima Liszt. She was named after Cosima's brother, Daniel Liszt, who "had tragically died of consumption in 1859". She was the step-daughter of German composer Richard Wagner, and the granddaughter of Franz Liszt, Hungarian composer, pianist and teacher. She was a "fine pianist" in her own right, who had been trained primarily by her mother but also coached by Wagner.

After her parents' divorce in 1870, she stayed with her mother Cosima, who married Wagner in the same year. Since then, she lived first in Tribschen, then in Bayreuth.

In the 1880s, she accompanied Wagner to Italy, where she met Henry Thode, an art historian, poet and translator who was the director of Stadelsches Institut, Frankfurt. She married Henry Thode on 3 July 1886 and lived with him until her return to Bayreuth in 1914 after their divorce.

She worked as a costume designer at the Bayreuth Festival, an annual musical event.

She published the letters of Hans Von Bülow, among others. She was an early supporter of National Socialism and joined the National Socialist Party.

She died in Bayreuth on 28 July 1940.
