= Paul von Joukowsky =

German scenic designer

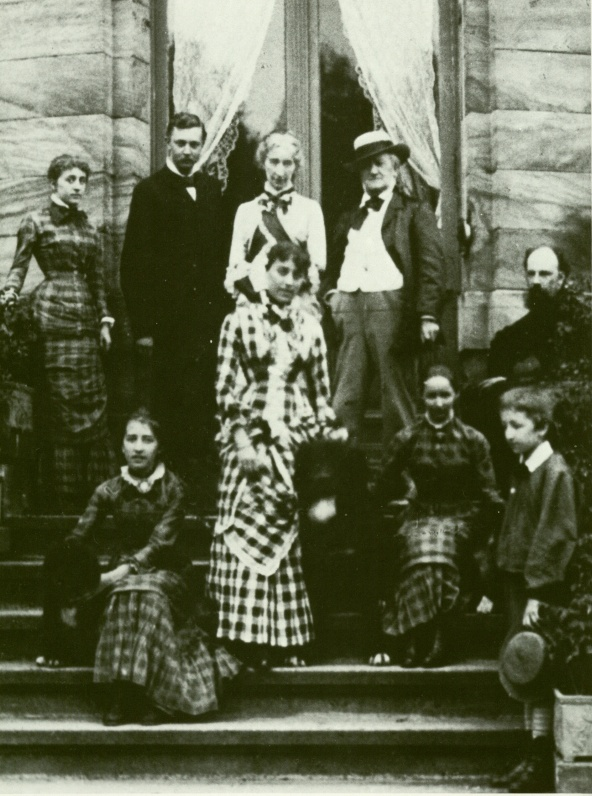
Paul von Joukowsky (right) with the Wagner family (1881)

Pavel Vasilyevich Zhukovsky, germanified as Paul von Joukowsky (Russian: Павел Васильевич Жуковский, Пауль фон Жуковски[й]; 13 January 1845 – 26 August 1912), was a German scenic designer and writer of Russian descent.

== Life ==
Born in Sachsenhausen (Frankfurt am Main), Joukowsky was the son of the Russian poet Vasily Zhukovsky. During 1863–64 he undertook a Grand Tour to Rome, Naples and Bonn with Hermann Ohl as Hofmeister.

He was introduced to Richard and Cosima Wagner at the Villa d'Angri near Naples on 18 January 1880. Later he accompanied them on their visits to Ravello and Siena, designed the stage clothes and four of the five sets for the Bayreuth premiere cast of Parsifal, for which he was inspired on his travels with the Wagner couple.

Joukowsky died in Weimar at the age of 67.
