= Hans von Bülow =

German conductor and pianist (1830–1894)

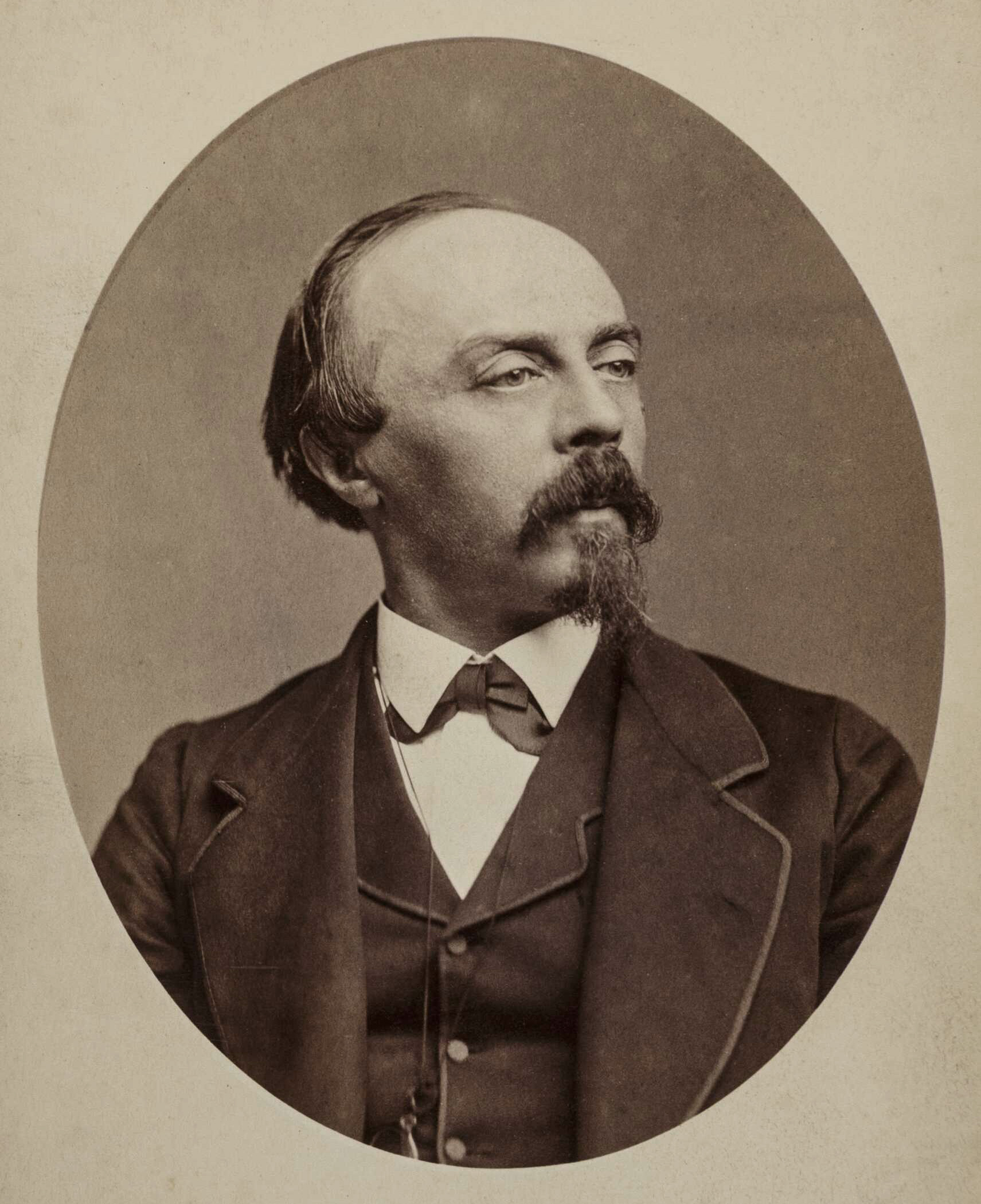
- Hans von Bülow, c. 1875
- Born: 8 January 1830; Dresden
- Died: 12 February 1894 (aged 64); Cairo, Egypt
- Occupations: Conductor; Pianist; Composer
- Spouses: Cosima Liszt; Marie Schanzer
- Family: Bülow family

Freiherr Hans Guido von Bülow (German: [ˌhans fɔn ˈbyːlo]; 8 January 1830 – 12 February 1894) was a German conductor, pianist, and composer of the Romantic era. As one of the most distinguished conductors of the 19th century, his activity was critical for establishing the successes of several major composers of the time, especially Richard Wagner and Johannes Brahms. Alongside Carl Tausig, Bülow was perhaps the most prominent of the early students of the Hungarian composer, pianist and conductor Franz Liszt; he gave the first public performance of Liszt's Sonata in B minor in 1857. He became acquainted with, fell in love with and eventually married Liszt's daughter Cosima, who later left him for Wagner. Noted for his interpretation of the works of Ludwig van Beethoven, he was one of the earliest European musicians to tour the United States.

== Life and career ==
Bülow was born in Dresden into the old and prominent House of Bülow. He was the son of novelist Karl Eduard von Bülow and his wife, Franziska Elisabeth Stoll von Berneck. From the age of nine, he was a student of Professor Friedrich Wieck (the father of Clara Schumann). However, his parents insisted that he study law instead of music, and they sent him to Leipzig. There he met Franz Liszt, and on hearing some music of Richard Wagner—specifically, the premiere of Lohengrin in 1850—he decided to ignore the dictates of his parents and make himself a career in music instead. He studied the piano in Leipzig with the famous pedagogue Louis Plaidy. He obtained his first conducting job in Zürich, on Wagner's recommendation, in 1850.

Bülow had a strongly acerbic personality and a sharp tongue; this alienated many musicians whom he worked with. He was dismissed from his Zurich job for this reason, but at the same time he was beginning to win renown for his ability to conduct new and complex works without a score. In 1851, he became a student of Liszt, marrying his daughter Cosima in 1857. They had two daughters: Daniela, born in 1860, and Blandina, born in 1863. During the 1850s and early 1860s he was active as a pianist, conductor, and writer, and became well known throughout Germany as well as Russia. In 1857, he premiered Liszt's Piano Sonata in B minor in Berlin.

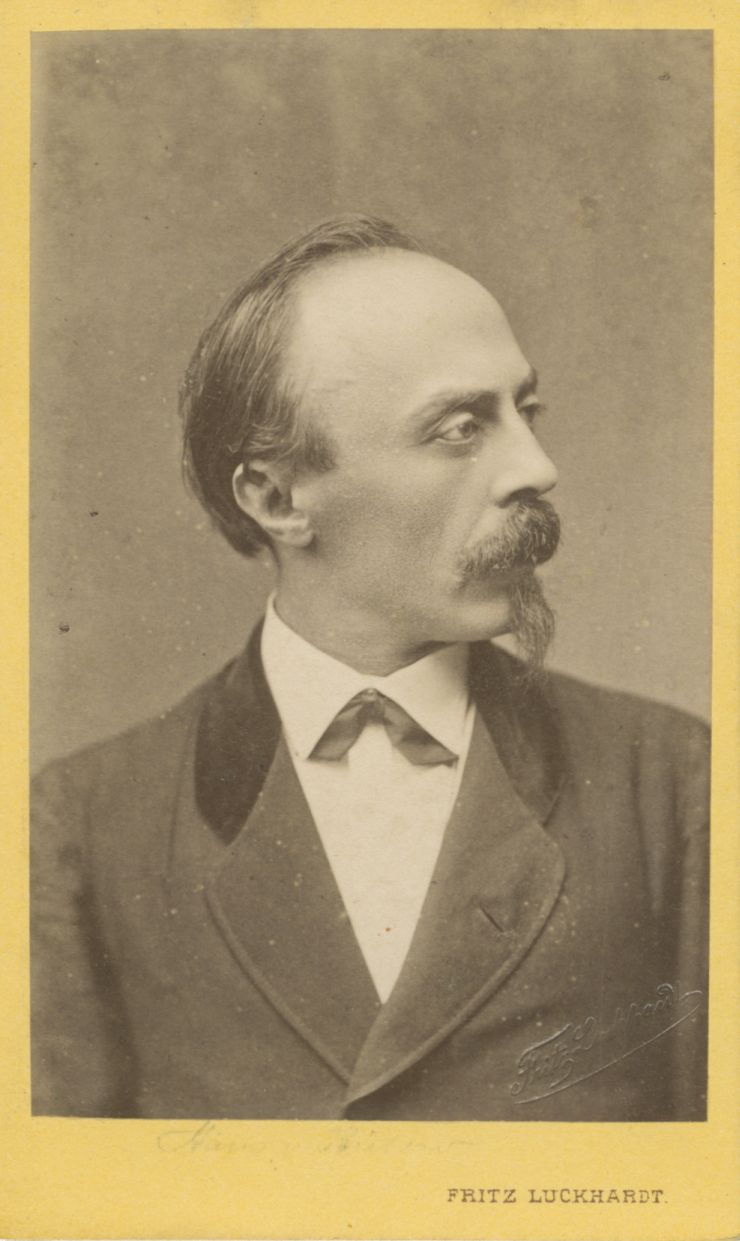
Undated portrait of Hans von Bülow

In 1864 he became the Hofkapellmeister in Munich, and it was at this post he achieved his principal renown. He conducted the premieres of two Wagner operas, Tristan und Isolde and Die Meistersinger von Nürnberg, in 1865 and 1868 respectively; both were immensely successful. Meanwhile, however, Cosima had been carrying on an affair with Richard Wagner and gave birth to their daughter Isolde in 1865. Two years later, they had another daughter, Eva. Although Cosima and Wagner's affair was now open knowledge, Bülow still refused to grant his wife a divorce. It was only when she gave birth to a third child, Siegfried, that the conductor at last relented. Their divorce was finalized in 1870, after which Cosima and Wagner married. Bülow never spoke to Wagner again, and he did not see his former wife for 11 years afterwards. However, he apparently continued to respect the composer on a professional level, as he still conducted his works and mourned Wagner's death in 1883. In July 1882 he married the actress Marie Schanzer.

In 1867 Bülow became director of the newly reopened Königliche Musikschule in Munich. He taught piano there in the manner of Liszt. He remained as director of the Conservatory until 1869. Bülow's students in Berlin included Asger Hamerik and Joseph Pache.

In addition to championing the music of Wagner, Bülow was a supporter of the music of Brahms and Tchaikovsky. He was the soloist in the world premiere of the Tchaikovsky Piano Concerto No. 1 in B♭ minor in Boston in 1875. He was also a devotee of Frédéric Chopin's music; he came up with epithets for all of Chopin's Opus 28 Preludes, but these have generally fallen into disuse. Only the D♭ major Prelude No. 15 is widely known by his title, the "Raindrop".

He was the first to perform (from memory) the complete cycle of Beethoven's piano sonatas, and with Sigmund Lebert, he co-produced an edition of the sonatas.

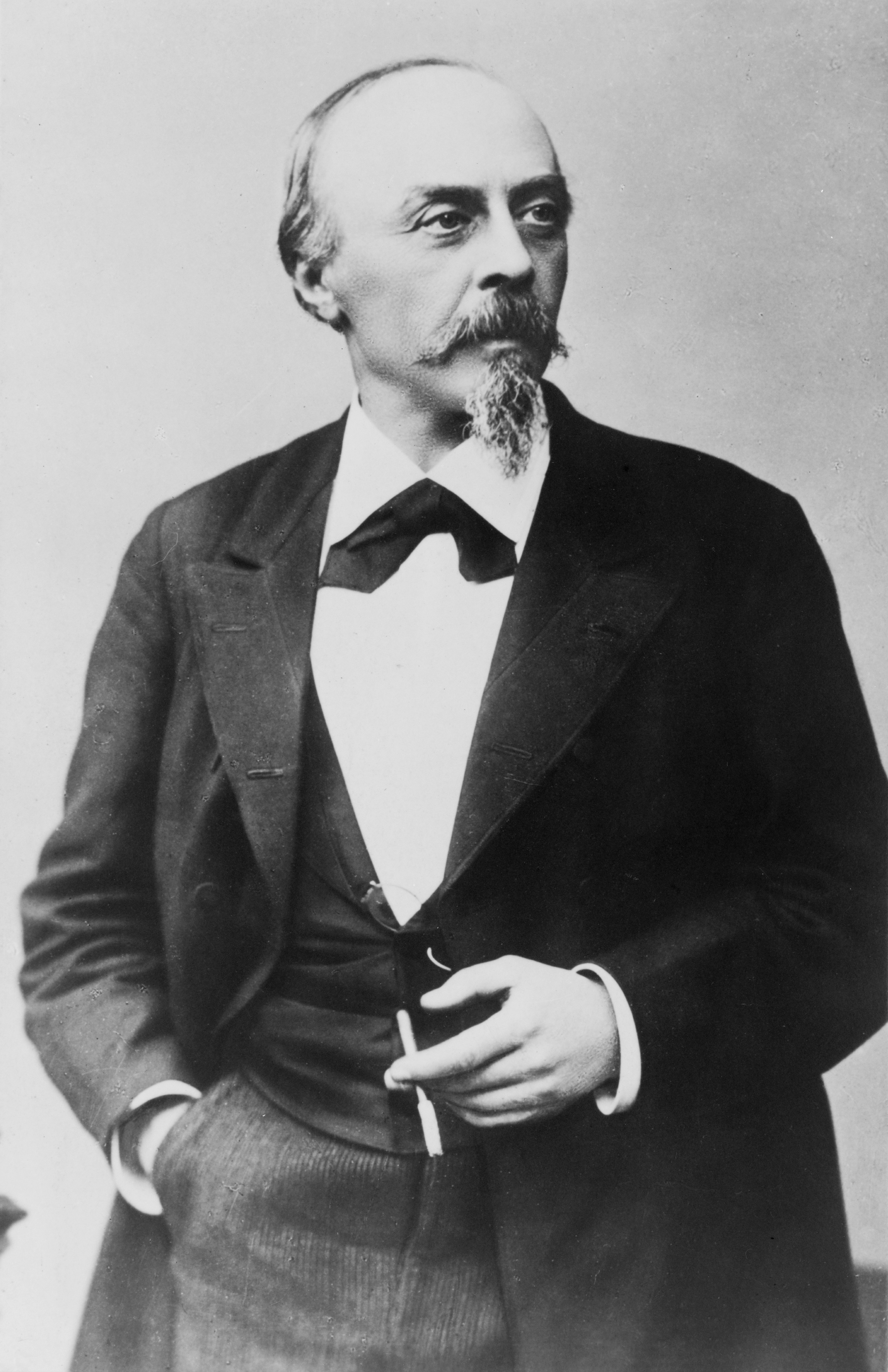
Hans von Bülow, c. 1889

For the winter season of 1877–1878, he was appointed as conductor of the orchestral subscription concerts presented at the newly opened St Andrew's Hall in Glasgow by Glasgow Choral Union, touring with their orchestra to repeat these programmes in other Scottish cities. Among the works he conducted there was the recently revised version of Brahms Symphony No 1.

From 1878 to 1880, he was Hofkapellmeister in Hanover but was forced to leave after fighting with a tenor singing the "Knight of the Swan [Schwan]" role in Lohengrin; Bülow had called him the "Knight of the Swine [Schwein]". In 1880 he moved to Meiningen where he took the equivalent post, and where he built the Meiningen Court Orchestra into one of the finest in Germany; among his other demands, he insisted that the musicians learn to play all their parts from memory.

It was during his five years in Meiningen that he met Richard Strauss (though the meeting actually took place in Berlin). His first opinion of the young composer was not favorable, but he changed his mind when he was confronted with a sample of Strauss's "Serenade". Later on, he used his influence to give Strauss his first regular employment as a conductor. Like Strauss, Bülow was attracted to the ideas of Max Stirner, whom he reputedly had known personally. In April 1892 Bülow closed his final performance with the Berlin Philharmonic, where he had been serving as Principal Conductor since 1887, with a speech "exalting" the ideas of Stirner. Together with John Henry Mackay, Stirner's biographer, he placed a memorial plaque at Stirner's last residence in Berlin. (Note: Charles Dowell Youmans, Richard Strauss's Orchestral Music and the German Intellectual Tradition, Indiana University Press, 2005, p. 91; The story of Bülow discussing Stirner from the conductor's podium is also described by Alex Ross, music critic for The New Yorker; Hans von Bülow's participation in placing a memorial plaque on Stirner's last residence is reported in a New York Times article on Stirner by James Huneker.)

Some of his orchestral innovations included the addition of the five-string double bass and the pedal timpani; the pedal timpani have since become standard instruments in the symphony orchestra.

In the late 1880s he settled in Hamburg, but continued to tour, both conducting and performing on the piano.

Bülow suffered from chronic neuralgiform headaches, which were caused by a tumor of the cervical radicular nerves. After about 1890 his mental and physical health began to fail, and he sought a warmer, drier climate for recovery; he died in a hotel in Cairo, Egypt, at the age of 64, ten months after his final concert performance.

== Notable premieres ==
=== As conductor ===
- Wagner, Tristan und Isolde, Munich, 10 June 1865
- Wagner, Die Meistersinger von Nürnberg, Hofoper, Munich, 21 June 1868

=== As pianist ===
- Beethoven, complete cycle of piano sonatas
- Liszt, Sonata in B minor, Berlin, 22 January 1857
- Liszt, Totentanz for Piano and Orchestra, The Hague, 15 April 1865
- Tchaikovsky, Piano Concerto No. 1, Boston, 25 October 1875

== Compositions ==
- 6 Lieder, Op. 1
- Rigoletto-Arabesken, Op. 2
- Mazurka-Impromptu. Op. 4
- 5 Lieder, Op. 5
- Invitation à la Polka, Op. 6
- Rêverie fantastique, Op. 7
- Song cycle Die Entsagende, Op. 8
- Overture and March to Shakespeare's Julius Caesar, Op. 10
- Ballade, Op. 11
- Chant polonais (after F. H. Truhn), Op. 12
- Mazurka-Fantasie, Op. 13
- Elfenjagd. Impromptu, Op. 14
- Des Sängers Fluch, Ballad for orchestra, Op. 16
- Rimembranze dell'opera Un ballo in maschera, Op. 17
- Trois Valses caractéristiques, Op. 18
- Tarantella, Op. 19
- Nirvana: symphonisches Stimmungsbild, Op. 20
- Il Carnevale di Milano, piano, Op. 21
- Vier Charakterstücke, orchestra, Op. 23
- Two Romances, Op. 26
- Lacerta. Impromptu, Op. 27
- Königsmarsch, Op 28
- 5 Gesänge for mixed choir, Op. 29
- 3 Lieder von August Freiherrn von Loen, Op. 30

== Piano transcriptions ==
- Christoph Willibald Gluck – Iphigenie in Aulis
- Richard Wagner:
  - Tristan und Isolde
  - Overture from Die Meistersinger von Nürnberg
  - Paraphrase of the quintet from Act III of Die Meistersinger
  - Faust Overture
- Carl Maria von Weber:
  - Konzertstück in F minor
  - Both piano concertos

== Notes and references ==
Notes

Sources

- Schonberg, Harold C. (1987). The Great Pianists from Mozart to the Present. New York: Simon and Schuster. ISBN 9780671638375.
- Walker, Alan (1987). Franz Liszt: The Weimar Years, 1848–1861. Ithaca, New York: Cornell University Press. ISBN 9780801497216.
