= Lafferentz =

Lafferentz is a surname. Notable people with the surname include:

- Bodo Lafferentz (1897–1974), German SS officer, Verena's spouse
- Verena Wagner Lafferentz (1920–2019), granddaughter of Richard Wagner
