= Roller =

Roller may refer to:

== Birds ==
- Roller, a bird of the family Coraciidae
- Roller (pigeon), a domesticated breed or variety of pigeon

== Devices ==
- Roller, an element of a rolling-element bearing
- Roller, used in rolling (metalworking)
- Roller, in a roller mill, to crush or grind various materials
- Roller, or training surcingle, around a horse's girth
- Roller (agricultural tool), a non-powered tool for flattening ground
- Roller (BEAM), a robot
- Rolling pin, a compacting device used for preparing dough for cooking
- Bicycle rollers, a type of bicycle trainer
- Foam roller, therapeutic exercise device
- Hair roller, used to curl hair
- Paint roller, a paint application tool
- Road roller, a vehicle for compacting
  - Steamroller, a form of road roller

== Arts and entertainment ==
- Bay City Rollers, or the Rollers, a Scottish pop rock band
- "The Roller", a 2011 song by Beady Eye
- "Roller" (Apache 207 song), 2019
- "Roller" (April Wine song), 1978
- Roller (Goblin album), 1976
- Roller, partner of the Optimus Prime character from the Transformers universe

== People with the surname ==
- Andreas Roller (1805–1891), German painter and theatrical set designer
- Arnold Roller (1878–1956), a pseudonym of Stephen Naft, Austrian writer and anarchist
- Charles Roller (1879–1963), American football player and coach
- A. Clyde Roller (1914–2005), American conductor and music educator
- Duane W. Roller (born 1946), American archaeologist, author, and professor emeritus
- Edeltraud Roller (1957-2020), German political scientist
- Florian Roller (born 1992), German rower
- Gustav Roller (1895–1959), German footballer
- Jochen Roller (born 1971), German choreographer
- Joseph Roller (1929–1998), Luxembourgish footballer
- Kelly Roller, Spanish drag queen
- Kyle Roller (born 1988), American baseball player
- Léon Roller (1928–1993), Luxembourgish boxer
- Margaret Roller (1888–1973), American artist
- Mihail Roller (1908–1958), Romanian communist politician
- Mileva Roller (1886–1949), Austrian painter
- Olivier Roller (born 1972), French photographer
- Philip Roller (born 1994), Thai footballer
- Steve Roller (born 1954), American athlete
- Ulrich Roller (1911–1941), putschist, stage designer and SS guard
- William Roller (1858–1949), English cricketer

== Other uses ==
- Apache Roller, a blog server written in Java
- Australia men's national wheelchair basketball team, or Rollers
- Roller (typeface), originally Iberica, by Carlos Winkow
- Roller printing on textiles

== See also ==
- Roll (disambiguation)
- Rollerball pen
- List of Rolls-Royce motor cars
