= Friedelind Wagner =

German opera director (1918–1991)

- Born: 29 March 1918; Bayreuth, German Empire
- Died: 8 May 1991 (aged 73); Herdecke, Germany
- Education: Sorbonne
- Occupation: Opera director
- Known for: Member of Wagner family and outspoken critic of German dictator Adolf Hitler and the Third Reich
- Parent(s): Siegfried Wagner and Winifred Wagner
- Relatives: Richard Wagner, Wolfgang Wagner, Winifred Wagner, Wieland Wagner, Verena Wagner

Friedelind Wagner (29 March 1918 – 8 May 1991) was the elder daughter of German opera composer Siegfried Wagner and his English wife Winifred Williams and the granddaughter of the composer Richard Wagner. She was also the great-granddaughter of the composer Franz Liszt.

== Life and career ==
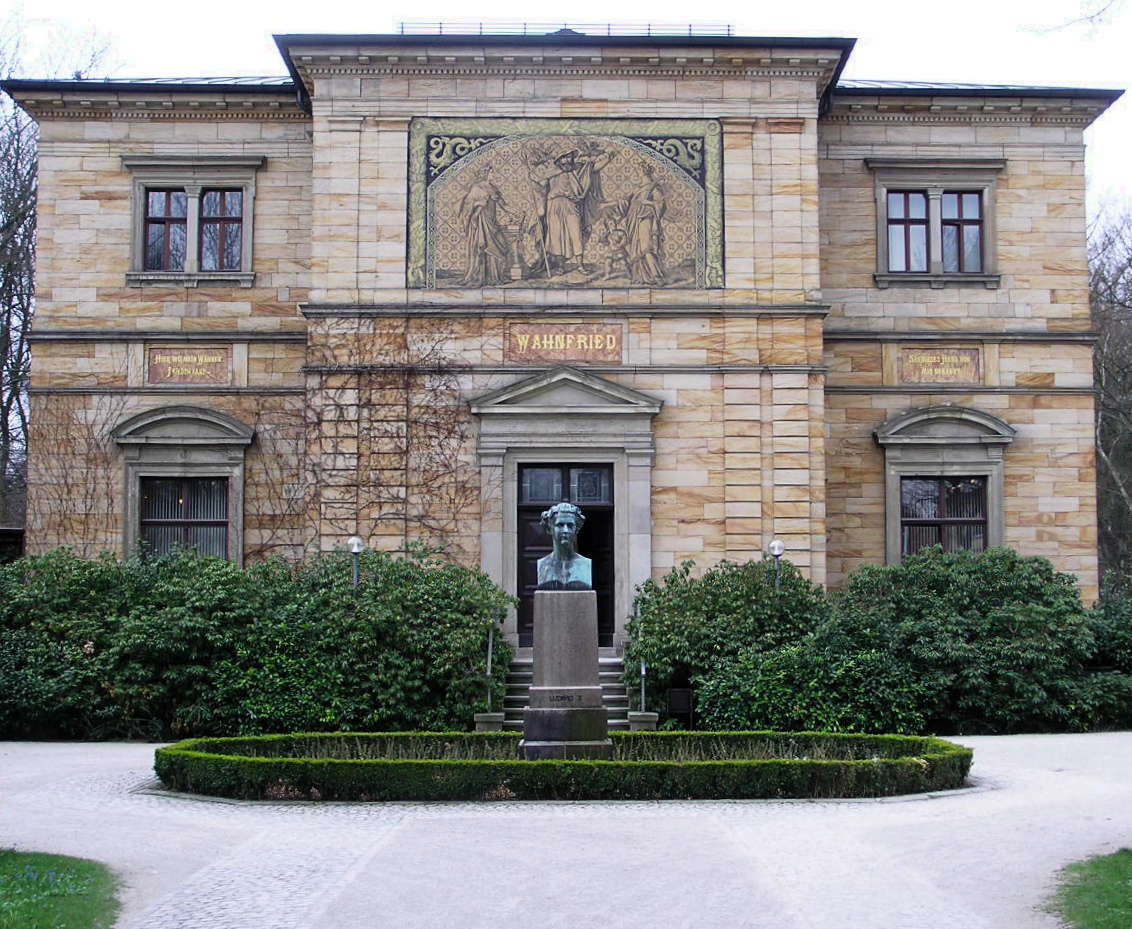
Wagner family home, Haus Wahnfried where Friedelind grew up

Born in Bayreuth, Friedelind Wagner was known by the nickname Die Maus or Mausi. Along with other members of her family, from early in life Friedelind Wagner was involved with the Bayreuth Festspielhaus. In 1936, Friedelind Wagner began work as an assistant to Heinz Tietjen but her outspoken criticism of close family friend Adolf Hitler — her mother, the English-born Winifred Williams, was a fanatical admirer of Hitler — and the policies of the Third Reich led to her leaving Germany in 1939. She lived for a short time in Switzerland, then emigrated first to England, where she was interned on the Isle of Man from 27 May 1940 till 15 February 1941. Later she began writing anti-Nazi columns for the Daily Sketch newspaper.

With the help of Arturo Toscanini, Friedelind Wagner moved to the United States in 1941, where she became involved with radio broadcasts of anti-Nazi propaganda and became an American citizen. She also helped Professor Henry A. Murray, director of the Harvard Psychological Clinic plus psychoanalyst Walter C. Langer and other experts to create a 1943 report for the OSS designated as the Analysis of the Personality of Adolph Hitler. With writer Page Cooper in 1945, Friedelind Wagner wrote her memoirs Heritage of Fire. Published in English, it was released in London in 1948 as The Royal Family of Bayreuth.

In 1953, Friedelind Wagner eventually returned to work at the Bayreuth Festival, occupying the top floor of the gardener's cottage at Haus Wahnfried, the Wagner home, that became later a museum. At Bayreuth, she directed master classes for young singers, conductors and directors. In 1976, she was part of the team that made the documentary film Wagner: The Making of the Ring, which was filmed during the creation of the Pierre Boulez/Patrice Chéreau Ring. The Times wrote: "This (Boulez/Chéreau) Ring is the most important single event in the democratization of opera and will put opera back at the center of all the arts, where it belongs."

As her student, American conductor Michael Tilson Thomas was a musical assistant and assistant conductor at the Bayreuth Festival.

In her latter years, Friedelind Wagner made her home in Lucerne, Switzerland. Never married, she died in a hospital in Herdecke, Germany in 1991.

== See also ==
- Wagner family tree
