= Verena Wagner Lafferentz =

Granddaughter of Richard Wagner

Verena Wagner
- Adolf Hitler with Verena and Friedelind Wagner in 1938
- Born: 2 December 1920; Bayreuth, Germany
- Died: 19 April 2019 (aged 98); Nussdorf, Überlingen, Germany
- Spouse: Bodo Lafferentz (m. 1943; died 1974)
- Children: 5
- Parents: Siegfried Wagner (father); Winifred Wagner (mother)
- Relatives: Wieland Wagner (brother); Friedelind Wagner (sister); Wolfgang Wagner (brother); Richard Wagner (paternal grandfather); Franz Liszt (great-grandfather)

Verena Wagner Lafferentz (2 December 1920 – 19 April 2019) was the fourth child and younger daughter of Winifred and Siegfried Wagner, and the youngest granddaughter of German composer Richard Wagner. She was also a great-granddaughter of the composer Franz Liszt.

Her father died, aged 61, when she was 10. Verena Wagner grew up in the Villa Wahnfried in Bayreuth and attended the Obernkirchener rural school. Adolf Hitler greatly favoured Wagner's music and became very close to Verena's mother, Winifred Wagner, who was a fanatical admirer of Hitler; there were even rumours that they would marry. She met him at the Bayreuth Festival in 1923. Hitler also befriended her children and treated them as his own.

Indeed, in 1940 Verena Wagner and Hitler were also rumoured to be romantically linked, although Hitler was said to have been uncomfortable with how the public would accept their three-decade age gap.

Many people affirm that Hitler would gladly marry the granddaughter of Richard Wagner, twenty-year-old, vivacious Verena Wagner, who is a frequent visitor and vacation guest at his mountain snuggery, were he not opposed in principle to marriages between persons of such unequal ages. She has the reputation of being his most outspoken critic, telling him in unflattering words simple truths that no Cabinet member would dare utter.

In 1943 Verena Wagner married Bodo Lafferentz, a member of the Nazi Party from 1933 and a high-ranking officer (SS-Obersturmbannführer) of the SS from 1939, assigned to the Race and Settlement Office. After World War II, her husband was interned during the Allies' denazification program, and released in 1949. They had five children: Amélie (1944–), Manfred (1945–), Winifred (1947–), Wieland (1949–) and Verena (1952–).

She was distinguished from other Wagner family members by her lack of artistic ambition, except for occasional appearances at the Bayreuth Festival and other musical commemorations honoring her grandfather. Wagner Lafferentz attended the International Richard Wagner Congress held in Copenhagen in 2003, attending as guest of honour a performance of Die Walküre by the Royal Danish Opera with Queen Margrethe, Prince Henrik, the patron of the Wagner Congress, Wolfgang and Gudrun Wagner, and Birgit Nilsson. In February 2007 she opened, as guest of honour, a grand concert of her grandfather's works at Sofia in Bulgaria.

Verena Wagner Lafferentz lived in modest retirement in the family's summer home in the village of Nußdorf in Überlingen, Germany, on Lake Constance, near the Swiss border. She died at her home in Nußdorf in 2019, at the age of 98. Wagner Lafferentz was an honorary member of various international Wagner societies, the vice-chairman of the Richard Wagner Foundation, and a foundation board member of the Bayreuth Festival.

== See also ==
- Wagner family
