= Carmen Reppel =

German soprano

- Born: Bergneustadt, Germany
- Education: Hochschule für Musik und Theater Hamburg
- Occupation: Operatic Soprano
- Organizations: Staatsoper Hannover; Bayreuth Festival; La Scala; Vienna State Opera; Bavarian State Opera; Deutsche Oper; Berlin State Opera; Hamburg State Opera; Staatsoper Stuttgart; Zurich Opera

Carmen Reppel is a German soprano active in both opera and concert. A member of the Staatstheater Hannover, she had a major international career, appearing in leading roles in over 60 operas. She also explored lesser-known repertoire such as Siegfried Wagner's Schwarzschwanenreich and appeared in contemporary operas, singing in world premieres of operas by Aribert Reimann and Flavio Testi. She is known for her parts in the Jahrhundertring, the centenary production of Wagner's Der Ring des Nibelungen at the Bayreuth Festival, including the filmed version of 1980.

== Career ==
Reppel was born in Bergneustadt. Her early studies were with Gisela Aulmann. At the Musikhochschule Hamburg, in addition to completing a diploma in music theory and history, acting, and diction, she did practical vocal studies with the Erna Berger. Later, she also studied with Alexander Kolo in Vienna.

=== Opera ===
Reppel made her debut on stage in 1968 at the Flensburg Opera as Elisabeth in Verdi's Don Carlos, and subsequently became a member of the Staatstheater Hannover. At the Bayreuth Festival, starting in 1977, she performed several roles in the centenary production of Wagner's Der Ring des Nibelungen, staged by Patrice Chéreau. She sang Freia in Das Rheingold, Gerhilde in Die Walküre and Gutrune in Götterdämmerung; she also appeared in the first two roles in the video version filmed in 1980. Reppel performed as a lead Blumenmädchen in Wolfgang Wagner's production of Parsifal from 1977 to 1980. In 1983, she sang the leading part of Hulda in concert performances of Siegfried Wagner's opera Schwarzschwanenreich in Solingen.

Internationally, Reppel sang at the San Francisco Opera in 1983 in the title role of Ariadne auf Naxos by Richard Strauss, and at the Teatro Municipal, National Opera of Chile, in 1984 as Chrysothemis in the first performance of Richard Strauss' Elektra in Santiago. She performed Elettra in Mozart's Idomeneo at the Staatsoper Stuttgart in 1984. Starting in 1985, she appeared as Leonore in Beethoven's Fidelio at the Hamburg State Opera and the Zurich Opera, and as Chrysothemis, Sieglinde, Elsa, Eva, Salome, and Arabella at the Vienna State Opera. In 1988, she performed Sieglinde in Die Walküre at the Teatro Comunale Bologna, and sang the title role of Salome at the Puccini Festival in Torre del Lago in 1989. She also sang the role of Chrysothemis in Prague with the Prague Philharmonic under Vaclav Neumann. The same year, she performed the part of the Kaiserin (Empress) in Die Frau ohne Schatten by Strauss at the Hamburgische Staatsoper, repeated a year later at the L’Opéra de Marseille. She sang the Empress at La Scala in the Ponnelle production conducted by Wolfgang Sawallisch, as well as the title role of Salome at the same theatre. She also sang Elsa and Leonora (Fidelio) in Tokyo with the NHK orchestra, conducted respectively by Wolfgang Sawallisch and Ferdinand Leitner. Other parts in her repertoire as a lirico-spinto soprano (lyrisch-dramatischer Sopran) are Mozart's Fiordiligi and both Donna Anna and Donna Elvira in his Don Giovanni, Marie, the title role of Bedřich Smetana's Prodaná nevěsta (a part which she sang in a TV production), Verdi's Leonora, Traviata and Desdemona, Puccini's Mimi and Liu, and a title role in Claude Debussy's Pelléas et Mélisande.

Reppel took part in several premieres. On 7 July 1986, at the Bavarian State Opera, Munich, she premiered the part of Andromache in the world premiere of Aribert Reimann's Troades, staged by Jean-Pierre Ponnelle and conducted by Gerd Albrecht. On 27 January 1987, she took part in the premiere of Flavio Testi's opera Riccardo III at La Scala.

=== Concert ===
In concert, Reppel has performed in oratorios and other choral works, for example in Beethoven's Missa solemnis in 1980. She has sung the lead soprano parts in Verdi's Requiem, Rossini's Stabat Mater, Dvorak's Requiem, Beethoven's Ninth Symphony, and Mahler's Eighth Symphony, among others. She hss also given Lieder concerts with a broad repertoire of songs by Schubert, Schumann, and Wagner, among others.

=== Concert ===
Carmen Reppel lives and teaches in Victoria, British Columbia, Canada.
