= Bodo Lafferentz =

Nazi SS officer (1897-1974)

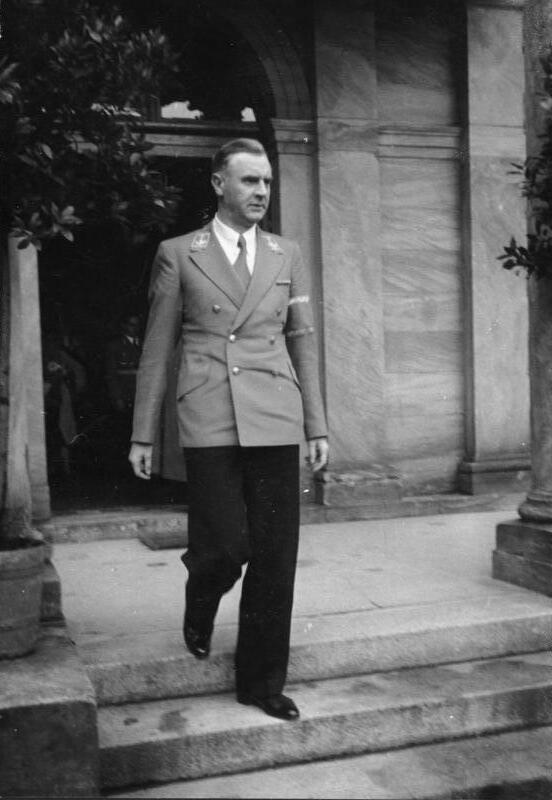
- Bodo Lafferentz, July 1940
- Born: 27 July 1897
- Died: 17 January 1974 (aged 76)
- Education: University of Kiel
- Spouse: Verena Wagner (m. 1943)
- Children: 5
- Military career
- Allegiance: German Empire (1914–1918); Weimar Republic (1918–24); Nazi Germany (1933–1945)
- Branch: Imperial German Army; Schutzstaffel
- Service years: 1914-1918; 1939-1945
- Rank: Obersturmbannführer
- Conflicts: World War I; World War II
- Awards: Iron Cross 2nd Class

Bodo Lafferentz (27 July 1897 – 17 January 1974) was a member of the Nazi Party from 1933 and an SS-Obersturmbannführer (Lieutenant Colonel) from 1939. In 1937, he was made a manager along with Ferdinand Porsche and Jakob Werlin of the Gesellschaft zur Vorbereitung des Deutschen Volkswagens mbH ("Association for the Preparation of the German People's Car"). He founded and oversaw the "Institute for Physical Research", an outpost of the Flossenbürg concentration camp, to further develop the V-2 rocket.

== Life ==
Lafferentz served in World War I and received the Iron Cross 2nd Class in 1916.

In 1928, he completed his doctorate at the University of Kiel in "Economic Planning and Price Regulation". He subsequently worked in the management of the German Employers' Association, and from 1929 was voluntarily on the management board of the National Institute of Benefits and Insurance for the Unemployed.

On 1 May 1933, Lafferentz became a member of the National Socialist German Workers' Party, and was made leader of the "Office for Travelling, Rambling and Holidays" (which was later amalgamated into the Strength Through Joy organisation).

In January 1938, Lafferentz was promoted to Reich Agency Leader, and was given sole leadership of the Agency in the Central Office of the German Labour Front in Berlin. In May 1937, he was made a manager (along with Ferdinand Porsche and Jakob Werlin) of the Gesellschaft zur Vorbereitung des Deutschen Volkswagens mbH ("Association for the Preparation of the German People's Car"), and in 1938 voluntarily became one of the CEOs of the company. He travelled extensively, searched for a good company location, and his recommendation of Fallersleben was accepted.

From 1939, he was a high-ranking officer in the SS (SS-Obersturmbannführer), and on the staff of the SS "Race and Settlement Central Agency". In 1942 he founded an "Association for Research and Development", to research oil shale sites and the use of wind power. In Bayreuth he founded and oversaw the "Institute for Physical Research", an outpost of the Flossenbürg concentration camp, to develop the V-2 rocket.

Lafferentz organised the Bayreuth "War Festival", as he had married Verena Wagner, the daughter of Siegfried and Winifred Wagner, and the granddaughter of Richard Wagner in 1943. He would have five children with her: Amelie (born 1944), Manfred (born 1945), Winifred (born 1947), Wieland (born 1949) and Verena (born 1952).

At the end of World War II, Bodo Lafferentz was interned during the Allies’ de-Nazification program and released in 1949.

== Literature ==
- Hans Mommsen, Manfred Grieger: Das Volkswagenwerk und seine Arbeiter im Dritten Reich (The Volkswagen Factory and its Employees in the Third Reich), ECON, Düsseldorf 1996, ISBN 3-430-16785-X

== Sources ==
- Most of the material in this article is from the German Wikipedia article
