= Op. 7 =

In music, Op. 7 stands for Opus number 7. Compositions that are assigned this number include:

- Barber – Music for a Scene from Shelley
- Beethoven – Piano Sonata No. 4
- Berlioz – Les nuits d'été
- Chopin – Mazurkas, Op. 7
- Clara Schumann – Piano Concerto
- Enescu – Octet
- Grieg – Piano Sonata
- Haas – String Quartet No. 2
- Handel – Organ concertos, Op. 7
- Jäger – Der Tod und das Mädchen
- Korngold – Der Ring des Polykrates
- Leifs – Organ Concerto
- Nielsen – Symphony No. 1
- Paganini – Violin Concerto No. 2
- Rachmaninoff – The Rock
- Schoenberg – String Quartets
- Schumann – Toccata
- Schütz – Musikalische Exequien
- Sibelius – Kullervo, choral symphony (1892)
- Stravinsky – Quatre études, Op. 7
- Vivaldi – Twelve Concertos, Op. 7
- Wagner – Schwarzschwanenreich
