= List of operas by Siegfried Wagner =

This is a complete list of operas by Siegfried Wagner (1869–1930), the son of Richard Wagner (1813–1883). All the opera libretti were by the composer.

== List ==
Opus	Title	Subdivisions	Compo-sition	Première date	Place, theatre
1	Der Bärenhäuter	3 acts	1898	22 January 1899	Munich, Hofoper
2	Herzog Wildfang	3 acts	1900	23 March 1901	Munich, Hofoper
3	Der Kobold	3 acts	1903	29 January 1904	Hamburg, Stadttheater
4	Bruder Lustig	3 acts	1904	13 October 1905	Hamburg, Stadttheater
5	Sternengebot	prologue and 3 acts	1906	21 January 1908	Hamburg, Stadttheater
6	Banadietrich	3 acts	1909	23 January 1910	Karlsruhe, Hoftheater
7	Schwarzschwanenreich	3 acts	1910	5 November 1918	Karlsruhe, Hoftheater
8	Sonnenflammen	3 acts	1912	30 October 1918	Darmstadt, Hoftheater
9	Der Heidenkönig	prologue and 3 acts	1913	16 December 1933	Cologne, Städtische Bühnen
10	Der Friedensengel	3 acts	1914	4 March 1926	Karlsruhe, Badisches Landestheater
11	An allem ist Hütchen schuld!	3 acts	1915	6 December 1917	Stuttgart, Hofoper
12a	Das Liebesopfer (libretto only, no music completed)	4 acts	1917		
13	Der Schmied von Marienburg	3 acts	1920	16 December 1920	Rostock, Städtische Bühnen
14	Rainulf und Adelasia	3 acts	1922	1923	Rostock (prelude only)
15	Die heilige Linde	3 acts	1927	2001	Keulen (prelude only)
16	Wahnopfer	3 acts	1928	1994	Rudolstadt, Heidecksburg only libretto and Act 1 finished
17	Walamund (libretto only, no music completed)	3 acts	1928		
18	Das Flüchlein, das Jeder mitbekam	3 acts	1929	29 April 1984	Kiel (completed by Hans Peter Mohr)
