= Wahnfried =

Richard Wagner's home in Bayreuth, Germany

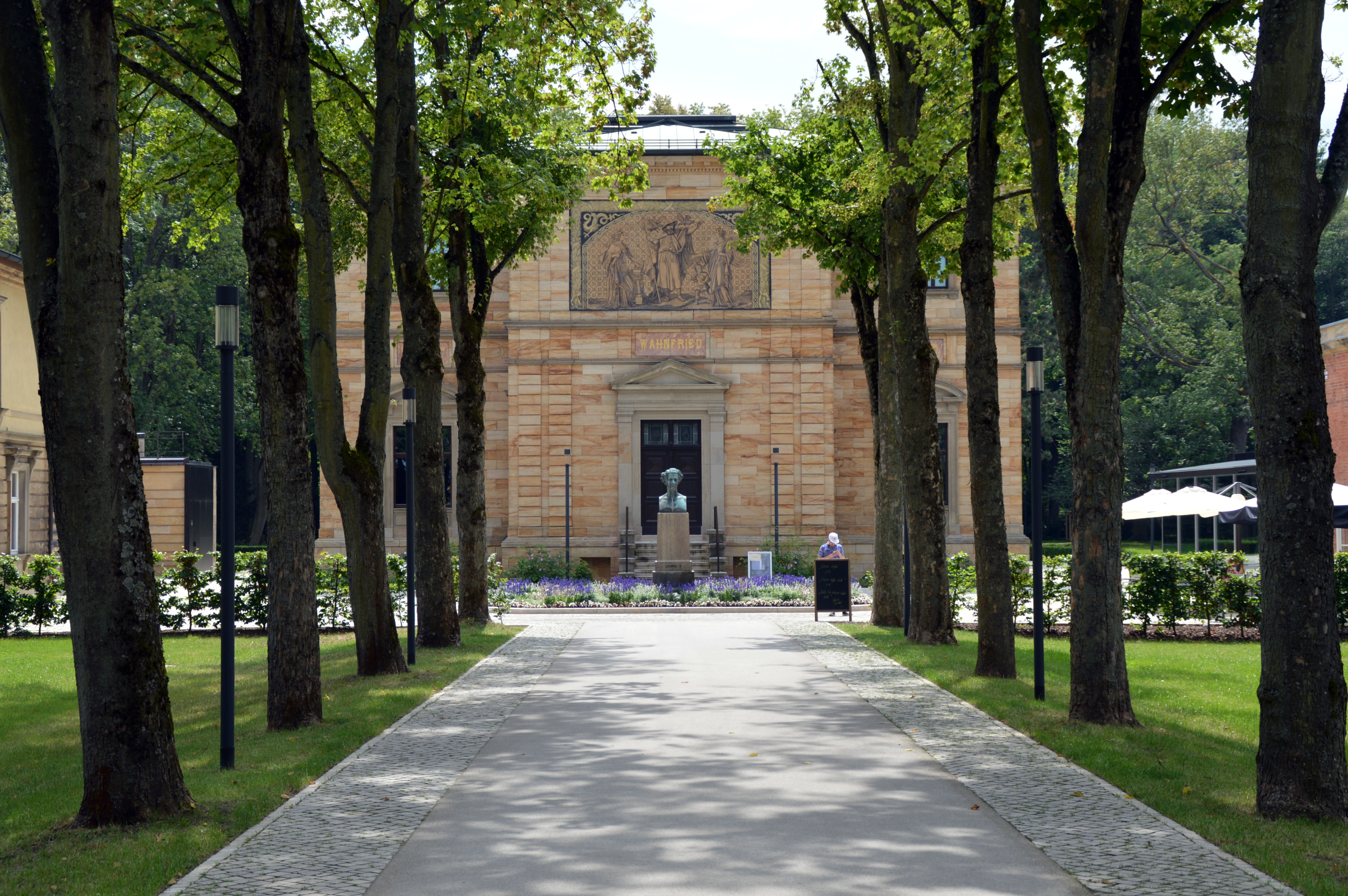
- Established: 24 July 1976
- Location: Bayreuth, Germany
- Coordinates: 49°56′28″N 11°34′56″E
- Founder: Richard Wagner Foundation
- Secretary: Doris Wiezorek
- Director: Sven Friedrich
- Curator: Oliver Zeidler
- Architect: Carl Wölfel after Wilhelm Neumann
- Owner: City of Bayreuth
- Public transit access: Bus: Number 302 and 307, "Haus Wahnfried" bus stop
- Parking: P6 (city hall Stadthalle/Am Geißmarkt) and P7 (multi-storey carpark in Badstrasse)
- Website: www.wagnermuseum.de/en/

Wahnfried is Richard Wagner's villa in Bayreuth, Bavaria, Germany. The name is a German compound of Wahn (delusion, madness) and Friede (peace).

== History ==
Financed by King Ludwig II of Bavaria, the house was constructed from 1872 to 1874 under Bayreuth Carl Wölfel's supervision after plans from Berlin architect Wilhelm Neumann, the plans being altered according to some ideas of Wagner. He and his family moved in on 28 April 1874, while the house was still under construction. Engraved across the portal is Wagner's motto: Hier wo mein Wähnen Frieden fand – Wahnfried – sei dieses Haus von mir benannt ("Here where my delusions have found peace, let this place be named Wahnfried"), which initially caused some amusement among local townsfolk.

Wagner did not spend the closing days of his life at Wahnfried, leaving Bayreuth on 6 September 1882 for the sixth and final time for Venice, where he resided until his death on 13 February 1883 at the Palazzo Vendramin-Calergi. Wagner's body was repatriated to Wahnfried in a public procession through Bayreuth on 18 February, and his grave lies next to that of his wife, Cosima on its grounds.

Leading up to and during World War II, the Bayreuth Festspielhaus and Wahnfried were frequently visited by Adolf Hitler, himself an avid admirer of Wagner, but in 1945 the living room with its rotunda and the guest room located on the side and rear of the house were destroyed by allied bombing, along with two-thirds of the rest of Bayreuth. Books, paintings and archives had been secured beforehand in the basement of the Winifred Wagner Hospital, however a Gestapo official stopped Winifred from removing historic furnishings such as Wagner's writing desk, accusing her of "defeatism". As a result, these were later destroyed in the bombing.

From 1949, after expropriation was lifted on the Festspielhaus, Richard Wagner's grandson Wieland Wagner, with his wife and their four children, returned to live in the habitable part of the hastily repaired Wahnfried, while Winifred lived at her late husband Siegfried Wagner's house next door. Upon Wieland's death in 1966, Wahnfried ceased to be a dwelling, after Wieland's brother, Wolfgang Wagner, had the house measured and asked his widow, Gertrud (née Reissinger), to pay rent, thereby forcing her to move out with her children. From 1953, Wolfgang had been settled in a house built on the edge of the Festpielhaus, with Winifred remaining in Siegfried's house until her death in 1980.

In 1973, Wolfgang and Winifred gifted Wahnfried to the city of Bayreuth. Over the next three years, the war- and weather-damaged parts of the house were restored to their original state with the recreation of the rotunda, salon and guest room, so that the official inauguration of the Richard Wagner Museum in Bayreuth was able to go ahead as planned on July 24, 1976.

A stylized version of Villa Wahnfried was used for the sets of Stefan Herheim's new production of Parsifal at the Bayreuth Festival in 2008.

The house was closed again in 2010 for extensive restoration and renovation at a cost of 20 million Euros. On 26 July 2015, there was a grand re-opening of the villa, with archive rooms and a new pavilion.

Along with the Bayreuth Festspielhaus, Wahnfried has become a shrine for admirers of Wagner. Visitors can take a walk in the remote Hofgarten, the baroque park of Bayreuth's New Castle, to where a path directly leads.

== Gallery ==
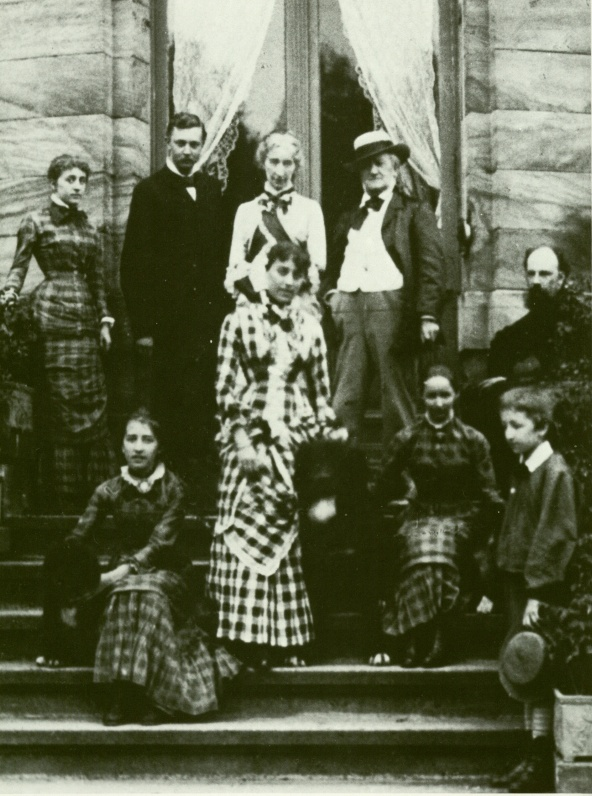
The Wagner Family and friends in front of Villa Wahnfried in 1881. Above, from left to right: Blandine von Bülow, Heinrich von Stein (Siegfried's teacher), Cosima & Richard Wagner, Paul von Joukowsky (family friend); below, from l to r: Isolde, Daniela von Bülow, Eva and Siegfried.

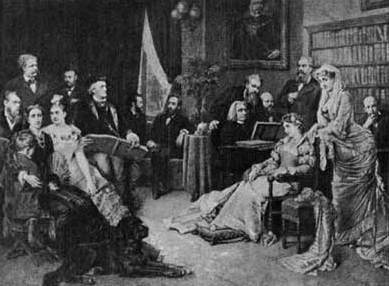
Painting by Georg Papperitz (1846–1918) shows Franz von Lenbach, Siegfried Wagner, Cosima Wagner, Mrs Materna, Richard Wagner, Hermann Levi, Hans Richter, Franz Liszt (at the piano) and others; painting of Ludwig II of Bavaria hanging at the wall

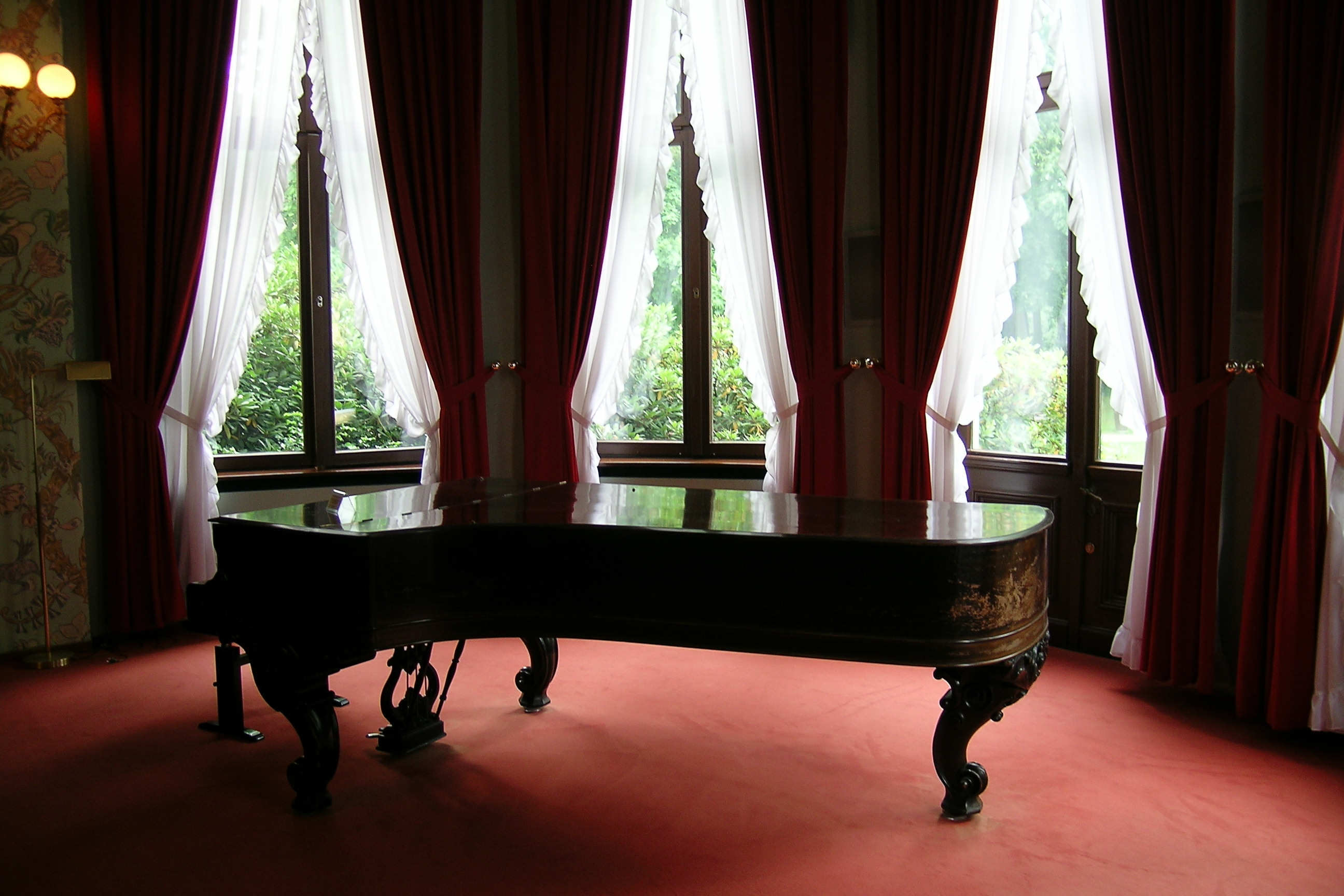
Wagner's Steinway grand piano in the Wahnfried drawing room. (2005)

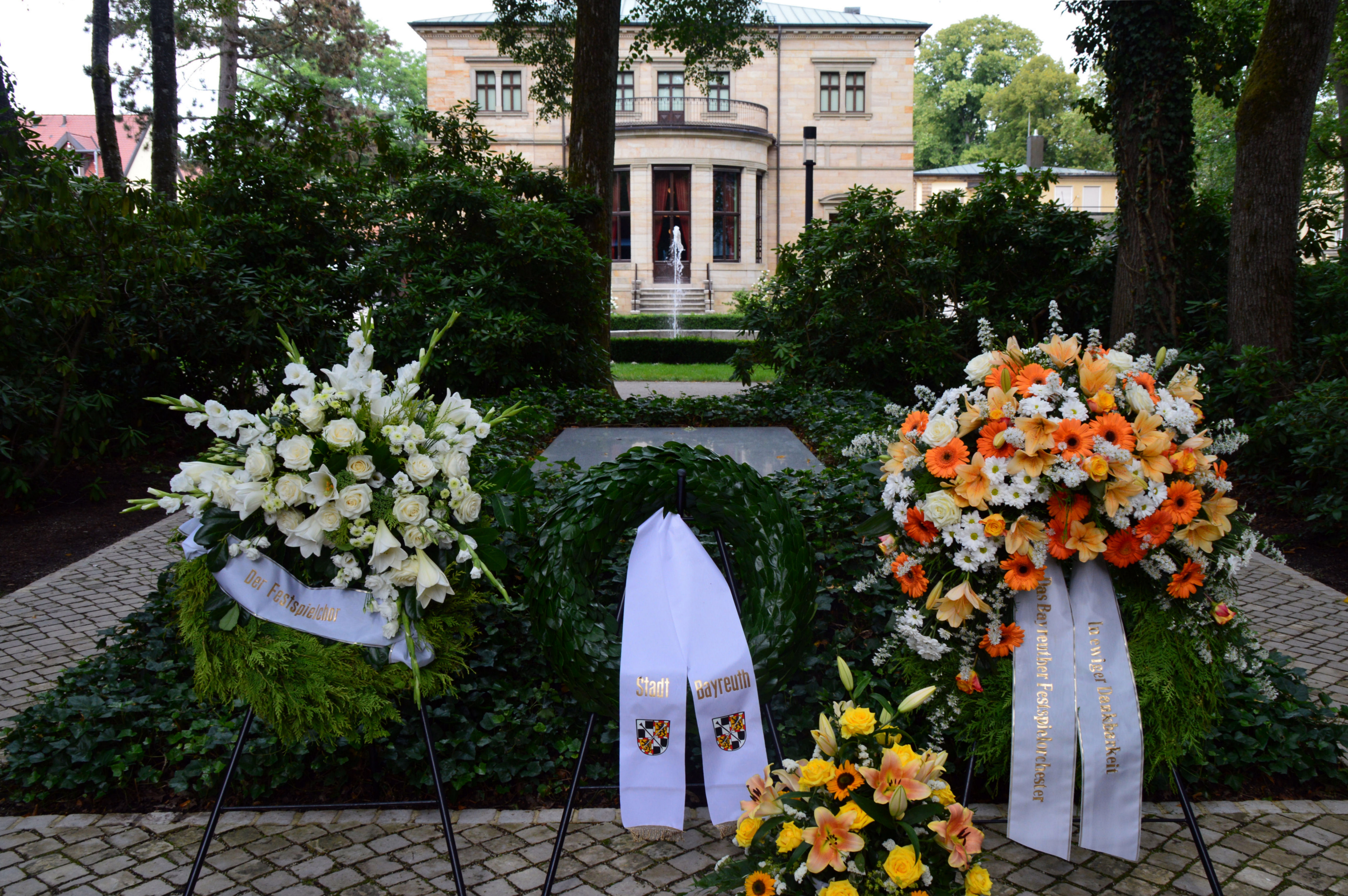
Grave of Richard Wagner

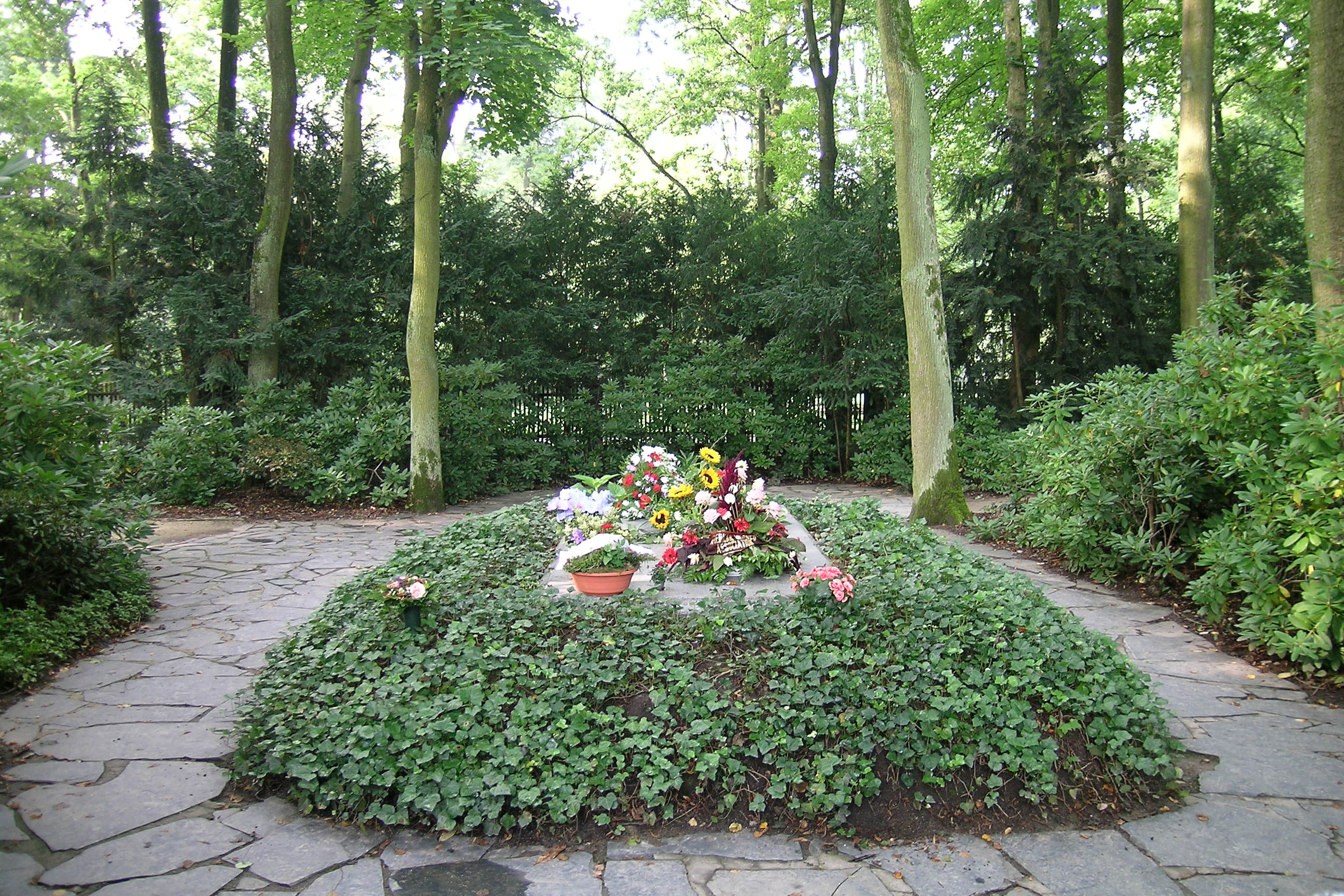
The Cosima Wagner grave in the Wahnfried garden.

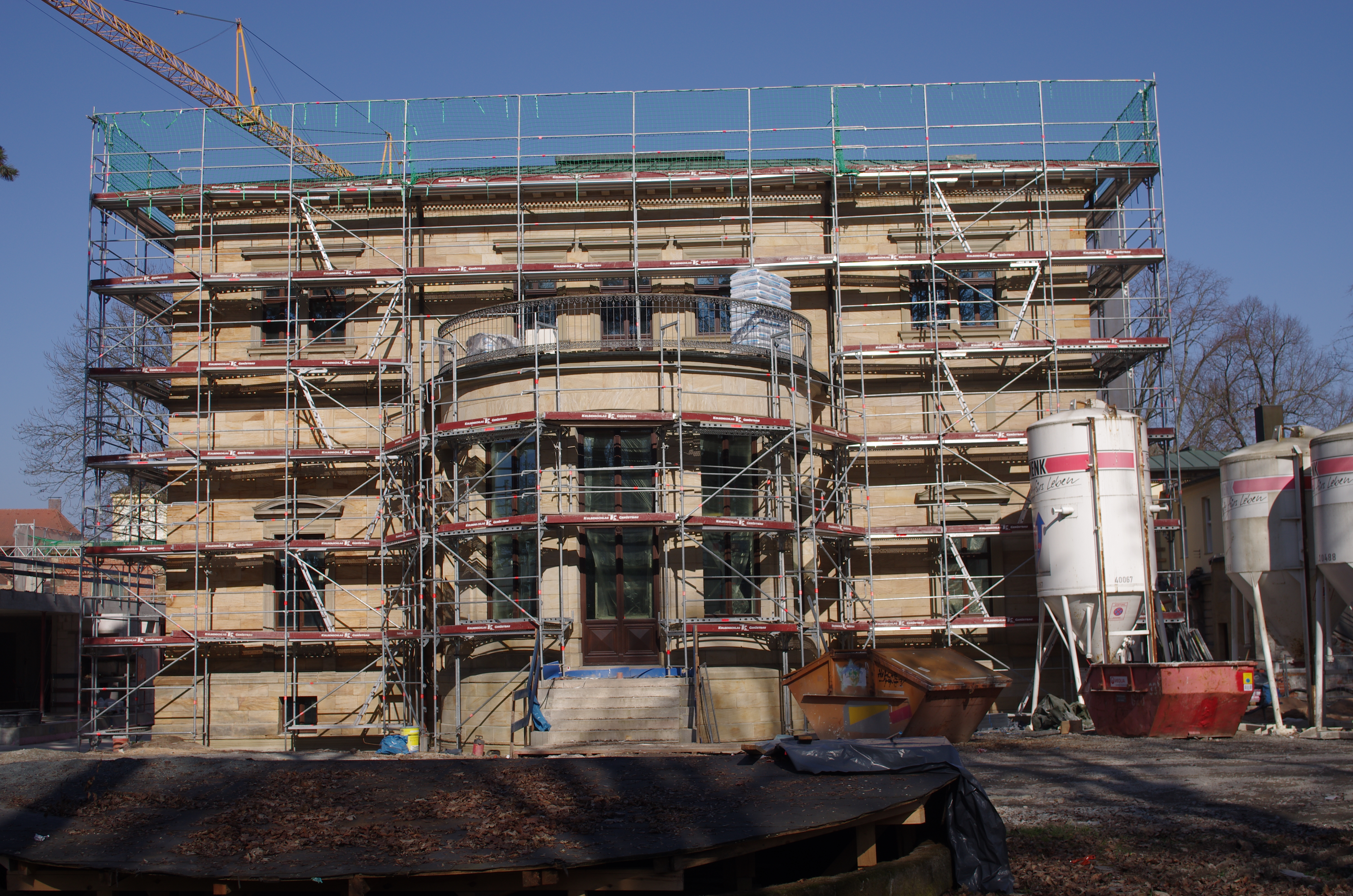
Rear elevation of Haus Wahnfried during renovation early 2014

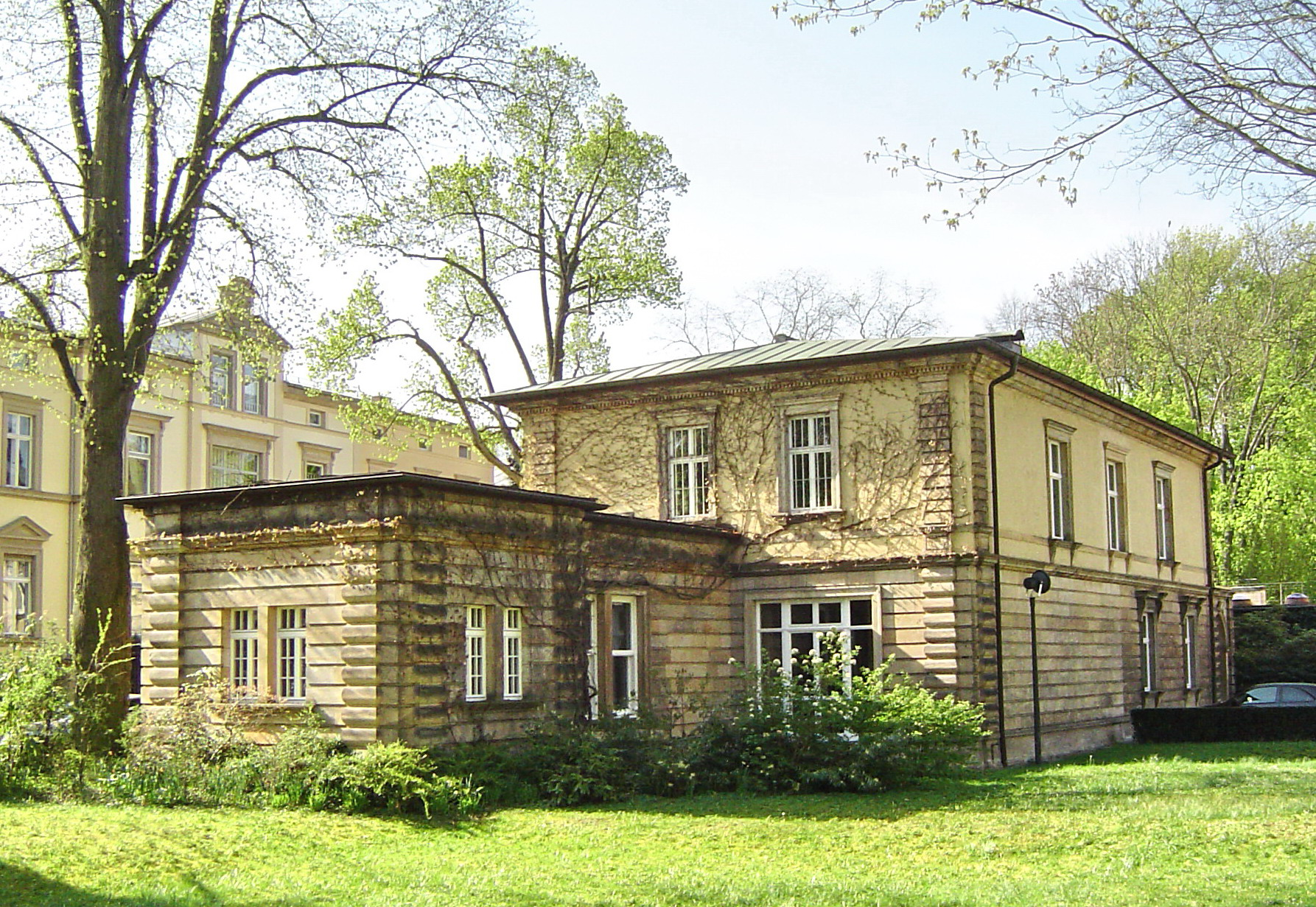
Bayreuth, Haus Wahnfried, Siegfriedhaus

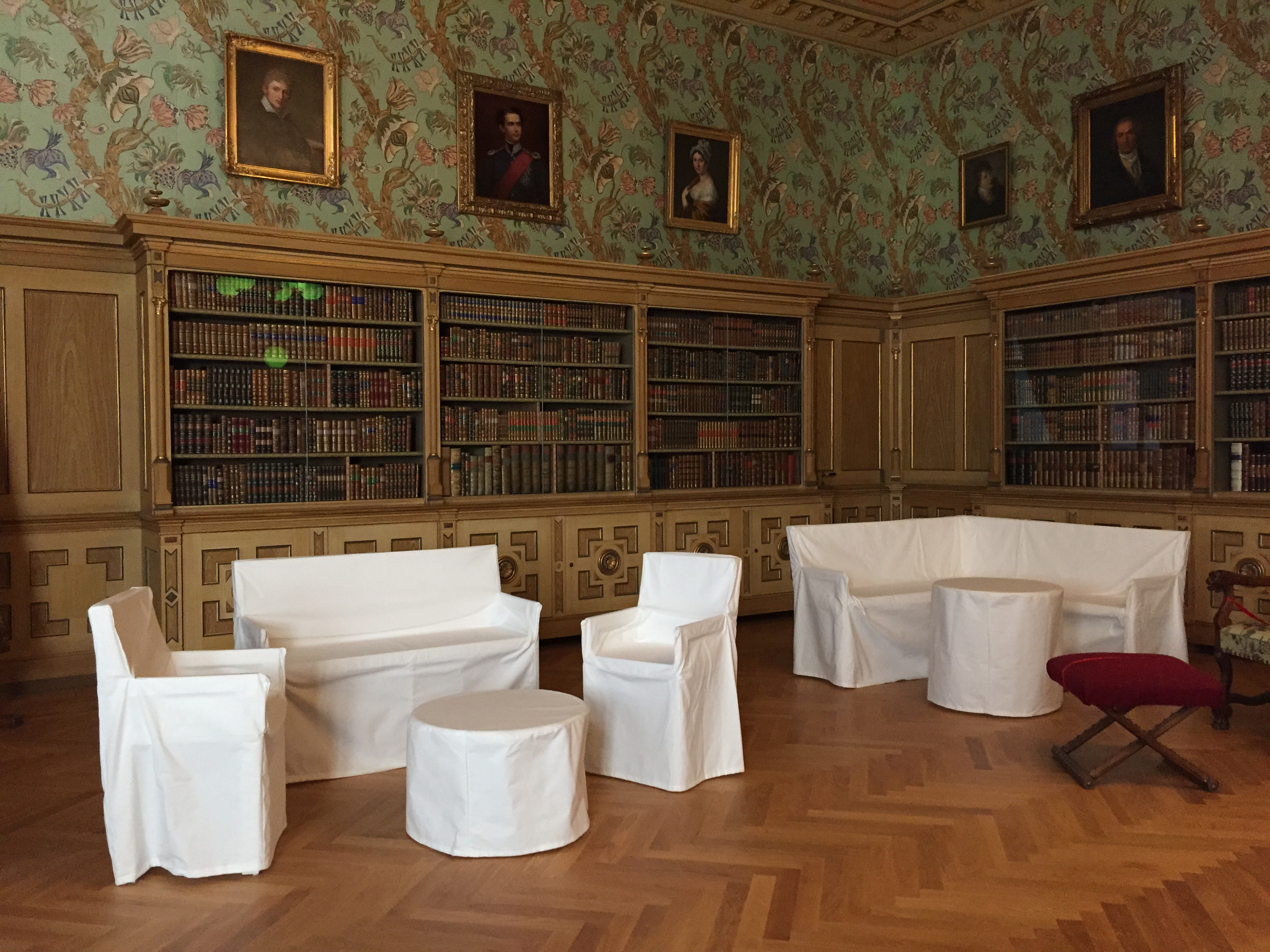
Wagner's library at Wahnfried

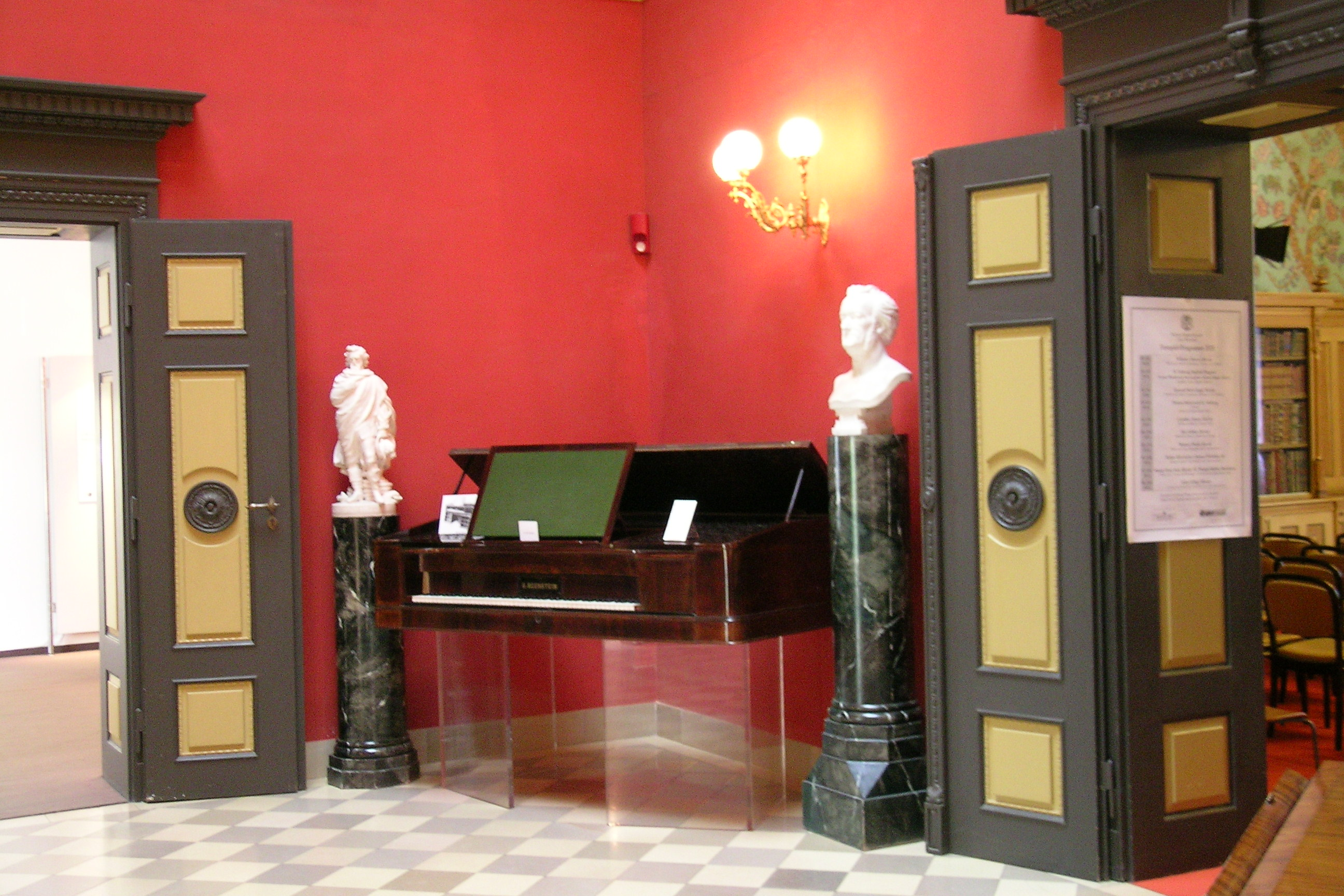
Restored lobby, showing the combined "composition piano" and writing desk specially made by Bechstein for Wagner, with a large music stand and space for papers

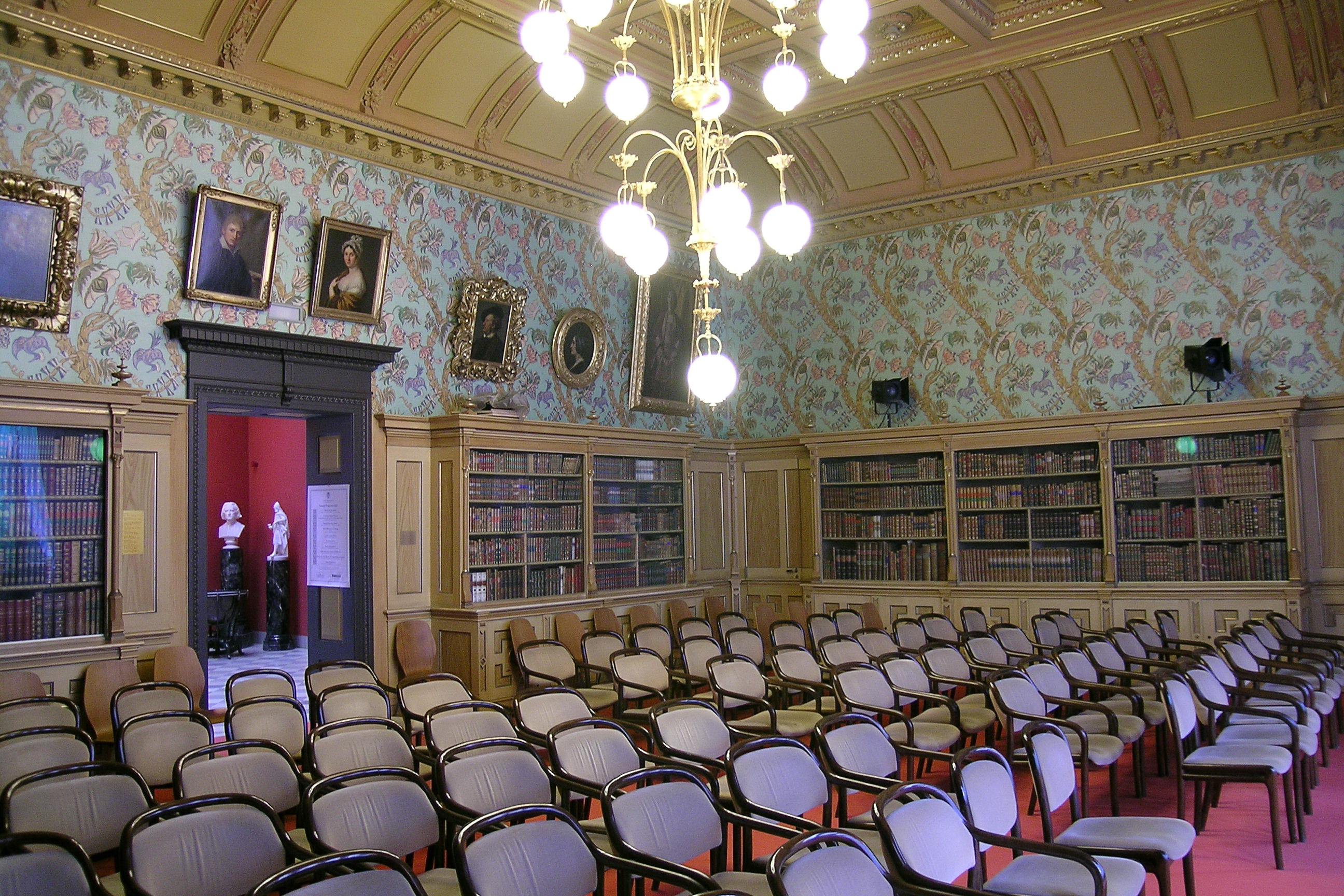
Restored library and lecture room

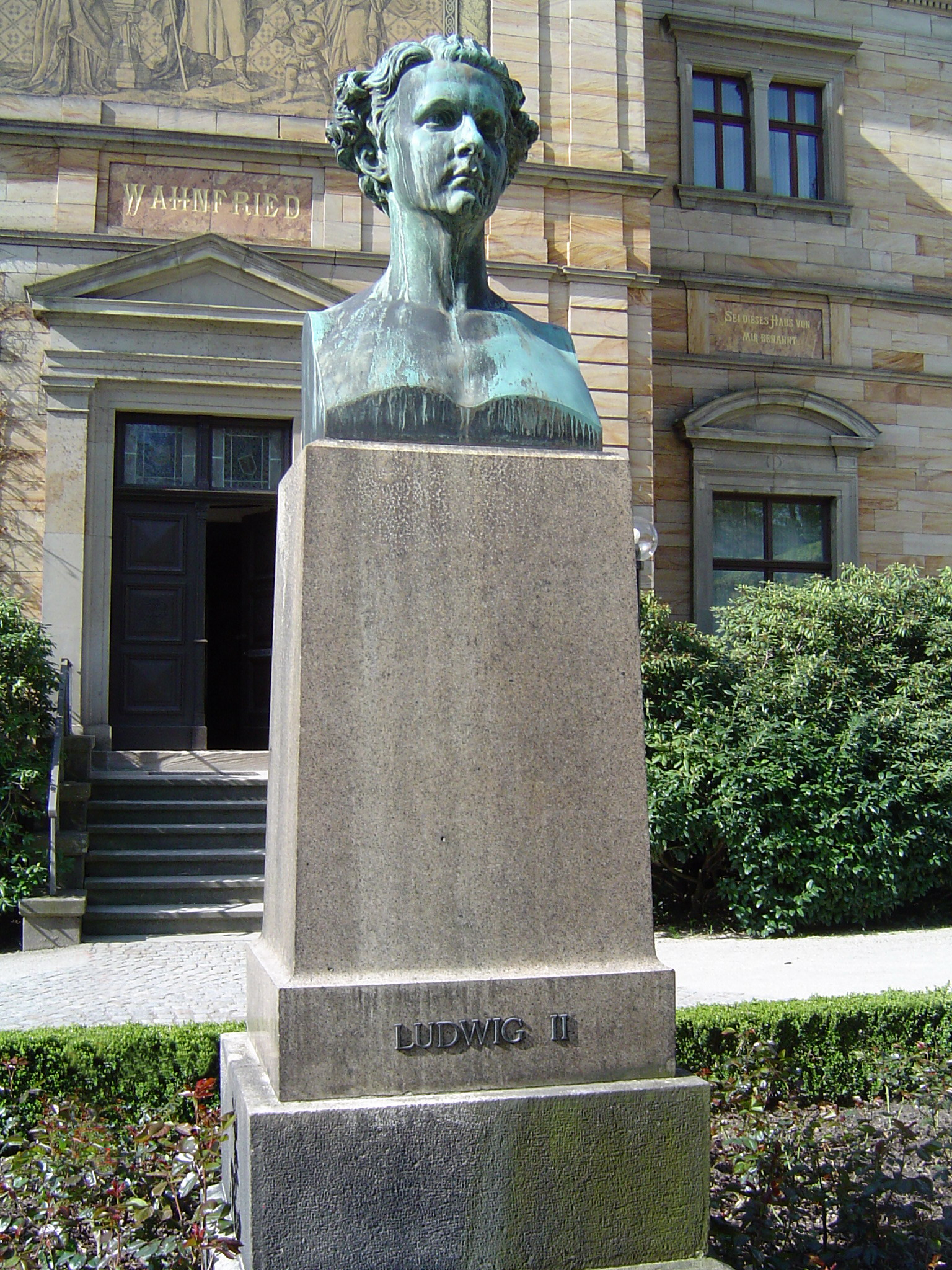
Bust of Ludwig II of Bavaria in front of Wahnfried

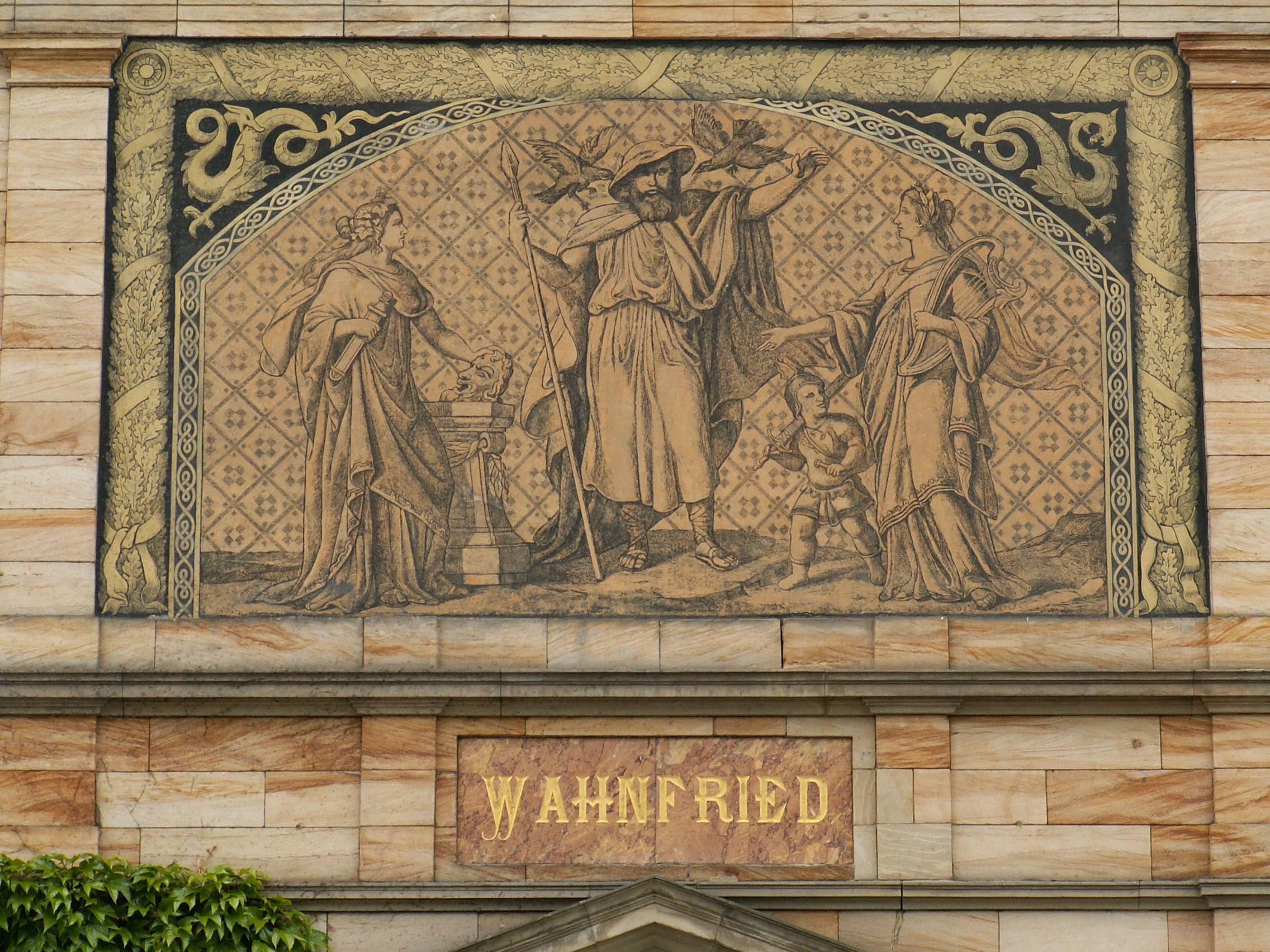
Engraving of Wagner's motto over the front portal to Wahnfried

== See also ==
- List of music museums
- Wahnfried (film)
