= Ulrich Roller =

Austrian putschist, stage designer, and SS guard

Ulrich Roller (27 May 1911 – 28 December 1941) was an Austrian putschist, stage designer and SS guard. He was the younger son of the Viennese Secession artists Alfred and Mileva Roller.

== Life and career ==
In July 1934 Ulrich was one of the Austrian Nazis that unsuccessfully attempted to overthrow the dictator Engelbert Dollfuss. The Rollers had a country home by the Mattsee (near Salzburg), and it was in this area that Ulrich took part in the fighting. When the putsch failed, Ulrich was arrested and detained for two years in the same internment camp that Dollfuss detained communists and social democrats. His father rushed from the Bayreuth Festival when he heard of his son's arrest, but Ulrich never saw his father again. Alfred died in Vienna in 1935.

At the time of the putsch Ulrich had been studying stage design at the Academy of Fine Arts Vienna, the same institution to which Hitler had twice unsuccessfully applied. Upon release from internment, Winifred Wagner immediately appointed Ulrich as an assistant for the 1936 Festival. Six years Wieland's senior, Ulrich was tall and attractive, and quickly became Wieland's admired friend and mentor. Wieland would often send Ulrich examples of his own stage designs asking him how to make them better. Ulrich was to have worked with Wieland for the projected new production of Tannhäuser at the 1942 Festival for which Ulrich had already designed the costumes. When the 1936 Festival ended, Ulrich embarked on a promising career at the German Opera in Berlin under the kindly paternalistic eye of Hitler. He was, however, back in Bayreuth for the 1937 Festival when, after one of the Festival's performances Hitler gave a reception for the Bayreuth artists and held court long into the night during which, with one eye on Ulrich, he told the story of how he had been too in awe of his father, Alfred Roller, to approach him at the Vienna State Opera.

Immediately after the Anschluss, in March 1938, Ulrich returned to Vienna where he became the stage designer and head of the costume department at the Vienna State Opera. To honour and celebrate the 75th birthday of Richard Strauss, the company premiered the composer's one act opera, Friedenstag (Day of Peace). Hitler arrived for the performance unannounced to cast his eye over his protege's work, and project himself as the Prince of Peace. Ulrich went on to work with Strauss on the sets for the projected second part of the opera double-bill, Daphne.

== Military service and death ==
On 1 November 1940 Ulrich was conscripted for military service. The call-up letter was sent to the Vienna State Opera which made no attempt to retain him. Goebbels would later note in his diary that the State Opera handled the whole affair with unfortunate laxness. Along with Wieland and twenty-three other young men whom Hitler and Winifred had identified, Ulrich was declared one of the "divinely blessed", and subsequently exempted from front line military service. His political credibility qualified him for a guard's role in the SS-Totenkopfverbände (SS-TV), literally Death's Head Unit, which was responsible for administering the Nazi concentration camps and extermination camps where he was posted to the homosexuals' section of the Sachsenhausen concentration camp at Oranienburg. Confronted by what he saw and experienced there Ulrich had what Hamann calls 'an existential crisis' and begged Winifred to release him from the list of the divinely blessed but he would not say why. Eventually she relented and Ulrich was posted to front line service near Moscow. Ulrich was killed on 28 December 1941 in the village of Stollpomka near Kaluga during the Russian campaign. Hitler was furious when he heard of Ulrich's death. It was, Winifred admitted, the one time when he was really angry with her.

Some Russian idiot shooting down a man like that! Look how many we have classified exempt from service; what difference does it make if five or six hundred talented people are let off? You can't replace a man like that!

When Winifred heard of Ulrich's death, she wrote to Mileva, a woman she did not personally know:

The news has just reached me, though I cannot grasp it yet, that your dear son Uli has died a hero's death for his fatherland and his beloved Führer. I bow my head in silent respect for what you, his mother, must be going through...For us it is like losing a dear member of the family. (Bayreuth is in mourning) for the loss of such an extraordinarily gifted artist - whom Wieland had selected to be his eventual collaborator ...Now his young life has been fulfilled, and he died as he lived: believing in the Führer and the National Socialist ideal; believing in the great fatherland of the future. He was faithful unto death, and set a shining example to us all.

In a later statement, the Roller family contradicted Winifred's opinion stating that Ulrich's death should be interpreted as an act of suicide.
