= Johannes Handschin =

Swiss artist (1899–1948)

Silvaplana 1934

Johannes Handschin a.k.a. Hans Handschin (1899–1948) was a noted Swiss artist and one of the leaders of the Basel graphic art movement known for their art deco posters.

Emil Cardinaux was one of the first Swiss artists to produce posters. His minimalist style and use of bold colours was used to promote Swiss skiing resorts. Artists that followed his lead and laid the groundwork for this new art form were Augusto Giacometti, Otto Morach, Carl Moos, Burkhard Mangold, Walther Koch and Otto Baumberger.

In 1925 Handschin was inspired by the transmission wheel poster of Niklaus Stoecklin (1896–1982), who had a passion for airbrushing objects, free of ornamentation, to express the perfection of the 'Machine Age' and using the technique as a substitute for photography in advertising consumer goods. This marked the start of the SachPlakat Basel school centered on the printer "Wassermann". During the 1930s to 1950s, hyperrealist poster artists such as Hans Handschin, Herbert Leupin, Peter Birkhäuser, Fritz Bühler, Max Dalang and Donald Brun produced a great number of lithographic posters depicting products created by Basel manufacturers, and whose works were characterised by a rich palette of colours and flawless printing.
