= Carl Moos =

Swiss artist and illustrator

Olympic medal record

Art competitions
Silver medal – second place	1928 Amsterdam	Graphic works

Carl Moos, otherwise Karl Franz Moos (29 October 1878 – 9 July 1959), was a German and Swiss artist and illustrator, notable for his Art Deco travel and sporting posters, particularly of skiing.

== Life ==
Moos was born in Munich in Bavaria, Germany, the son of Franz Moos, a portrait painter. He trained in commercial art in Munich and worked as an illustrator for, among others, the Münchener Tagespresse. He also established himself as a creator of postcards and posters.

He was a member of the Munich commercial artists' group Die Sechs, together with Friedrich Heubner, Valentin Zietara, Emil Preetorius, Max Schwarzer and Franz Paul Glass, which aimed to improve the standing of advertising and poster graphics.

In World War I he left Munich and in 1915 settled in Zurich in Switzerland, where he spent the rest of his life. He continued his career as a successful freelance artist, also developing his poster work in the vanguard of the Swiss poster movement begun by Johannes Handschin. From 1928 to 1933 he worked as artistic director of the Art Institut Orell Füssli.

In 1928 he won a silver medal for Switzerland in the art competitions of the Amsterdam Olympic Games for his poster "Leichtathletisches Plakat".

His travel, sporting, and commercial posters have sold at international auction for thousands of dollars.
