= Schwarzschwanenreich =

- Opera by Siegfried Wagner
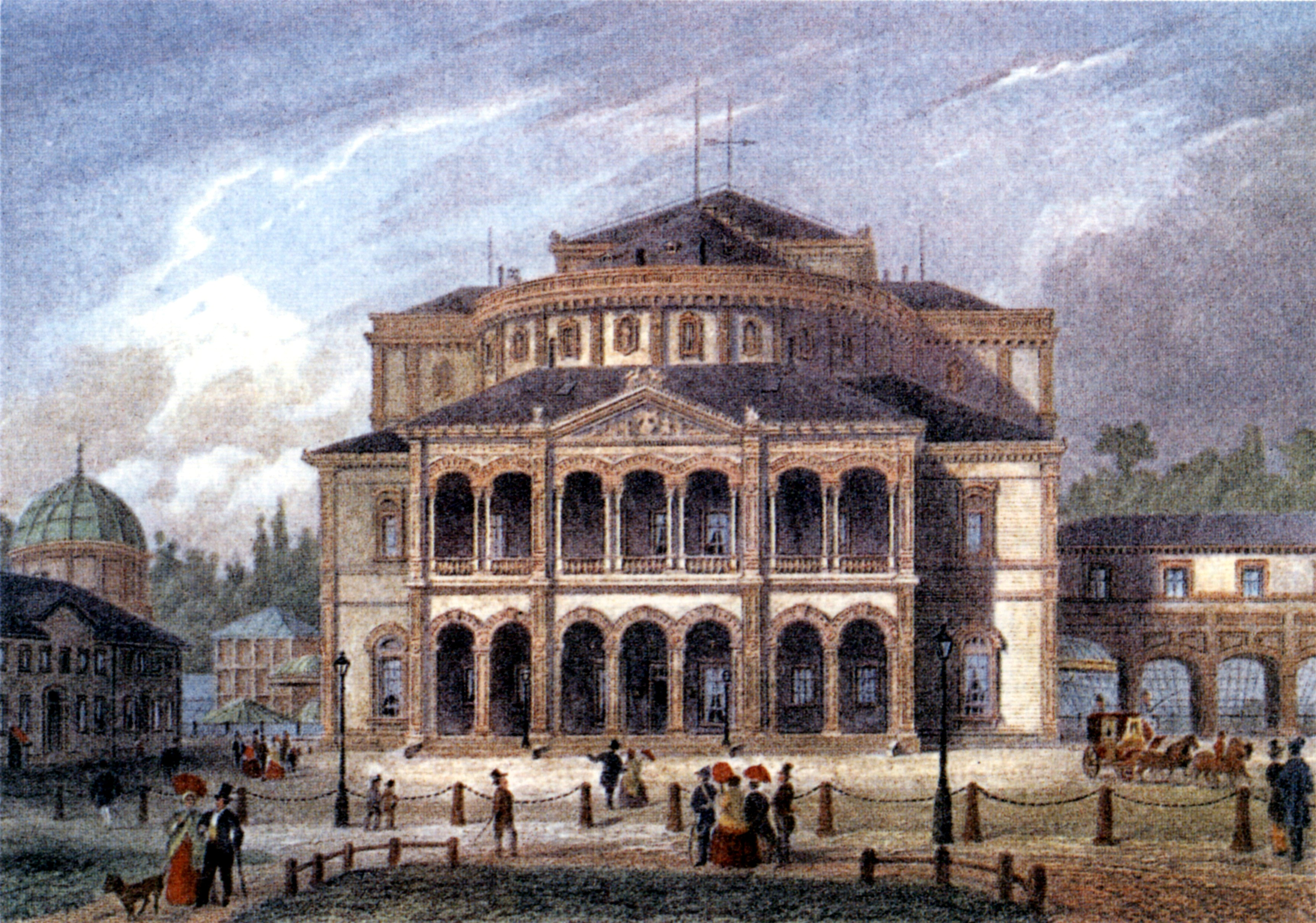
- Hoftheater Karlsruhe, the location of the opera's premiere
- Translation: Realm of the Black Swan
- Librettist: Siegfried Wagner
- Language: German
- Premiere: 5 November 1918; Hoftheater Karlsruhe

Schwarzschwanenreich (Realm of the Black Swan), Op. 7, is an opera in German in three acts composed by Siegfried Wagner in 1910 to his own libretto. It premiered on 5 November 1918 in Karlsruhe at the court theatre Großherzogliches Hoftheater.

== History ==
Siegfried Wagner, the son of Richard Wagner, composed several operas on fairy tale and legendary topics. He completed the first act of Schwarzschwanenreich on 13 April 1909 in Santa Margherita Ligure, worked on the second act in November 1909 in Bayreuth and finished the opera with the third act on 10 April 1910 in Santa Margherita. The background of the action is provided by witch trials during the Thirty Years' War. As many women in Bohemia were burned as witches, the heroine Hulda, afraid of the Inquisition, has killed her illegitimate child and buried it in the forest. When the scene opens she is in the forest and sings of her regret and the dream of a friend whose understanding could free her from the burden of remorse.

== Roles ==
The action takes place in Bohemia in the 17th century.

Roles, voice types, premiere cast
Role	Voice type	Premiere cast, 5 November 1918 Conductor: Fritz Cortolezis
Hulda (Linda)	soprano	Edith Sajitz
Liebhold (Ludwig)	tenor	Helmut Neugebauer
Ursula, Liebhold's sister	mezzo-soprano	Margarete Bruntsch
Oswald	baritone	Benno Ziegler
Aschenweibchen	contralto	Marie Mosel-Tomschik
Gefängniswärter (prison guardian)	bass	Gottfried Hagedorn
Versucher	baritone	Rudolf Maly-Motta
Young man	tenor	Franz Schwerdt
Girl	soprano	Nelly Schlager

== Performances ==
The opera was premiered at the Großherzogliches Hoftheater Karlsruhe on 5 November 1918, on the occasion of the birthday of the Großherzogin (Grand duchess) ("Zur Feier des Geburtsfestes Ihrer Königlichen Hoheit Der Großherzogin", conducted by Fritz Cortolezis and staged by Peter Dumas.

It was revived in a concert performance at the Theater der Stadt Solingen on 12 June 1983. Bernhard Lang conducted the Municipal Orchestra Solingen, with Carmen Reppel as Hulda and Raffaele Polani as Liebhold.

The opera was recorded live in June 1994 as part of the Rudolstädter Festspiele at the Theater Rudolstadt (Thüringer Landestheater), conducted by Konrad Bach. The leading parts were performed by Beth Johanning and Walter Raffeiner.
