= Margaret Roller =

American artist

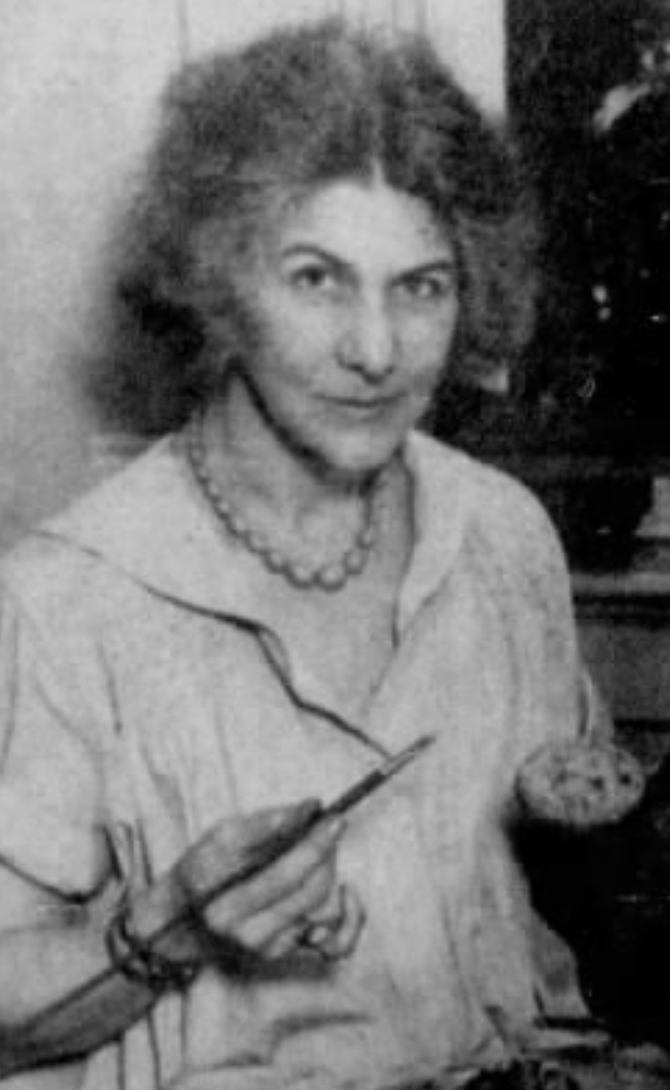
- Roller holding a paintbrush and a model, from a 1928 publication
- Born: Margaret Jane Russell; February 5, 1888; Luray, Page County, Virginia, U.S.
- Died: October 8, 1973 (aged 85); Washington, D.C., U.S.
- Occupation: Artist

Margaret Jane Russell Roller (February 5, 1888 – October 8, 1973) was an American artist who worked for the United States Department of Agriculture (USDA).

== Early life and education ==
Roller was born in Luray, Virginia, one of the five daughters of Robert Hill Russell and Almira Jane Rohrer Russell.

== Career ==
Roller was a scientific illustrator. She created and painted plaster, plasticine, and wax models of food, animals, and people for the USDA's exhibits from the 1920s until 1937, when she became a freelance artist. She also made models for the Bureau of Fisheries, and posters for the Children's Bureau. A newsreel feature about her "unusual occupation" was shown in cinemas in 1945. "Her models are used all over America, in Canada and in South America, in dietary courses at hospitals, at egg and poultry fairs, at state fairs and in exhibitions," a 1960 profile explained.

Specific works by Roller include a model of a horse sculpture given to George Washington by the king of Spain, and a "mechanical hen fitted with compartments corresponding to the various organs of a chicken," exhibited at the World's Poultry Congress in London in 1930. She also designed a poster for the Arts Club of Washington, for an event at the Willard Hotel in 1933.

== Personal life ==
Russell married fellow artist Samuel Kagey Roller in 1913. They had two children, Jane and Edwin, both born in Louisiana (a third child, John, died in infancy in 1920). After they divorced, she raised her son and daughter in Takoma Park, Maryland. She died in 1973, at the age of 85, in Washington, D.C. Her daughter became a botanist and botanical illustrator at the USDA, especially for the United States Forest Service.
