= Jakob Werlin =

Jakob Werlin (10 May 1886, in Andritz – 23 September 1965, in Salzburg) was an Austrian auto salesman who worked primarily in Germany. Due to his early contact with Adolf Hitler, he became an honorary SS leader and Hitler's primary interface with the Daimler-Benz company.

== History ==
In 1921, Werlin worked for the Benz motor company in Munich. He became acquainted with Adolf Hitler in 1923, as the Benz dealership was located next to the office where the Völkischer Beobachter was printed. That same year he sold a Benz to Hitler for the use of the Nazi Party, and thereafter the Party would come to Werlin to purchase limousines. Jakob Werlin, who not only advised Hitler on the purchase of his Mercedes-Benz automobiles but also often accompanied him to the annual German Auto Show in Berlin (Automobil- Ausstellung Berlin) and other motor related events. After the merger with Daimler in 1926 Werlin was leader of the local Daimler-Benz subsidiary, and started the Mercedes dealership in Munich (Niederlassung München).

In 1934 Werlin became a member of the Nazi Party and a confidant of Hitler. Along with Ferdinand Porsche, Werlin was involved with Hitler's attempt to build the People's Car (Volkswagen), but was critical of its success.

Although placed in an American internment camp until 1948, Werlin survived the war.

Vertriebsgemeinschaft Werlin at Hochstrasse 14 is a Mercedes-Benz dealership started by Jakob Werlin after World War II. The firm granted Werlin the facility for his part in protecting the safety of Bimbo, the Jewish wife of Wilhelm Haspel, head of Daimler-Benz from 1942 to 1952.

== Death ==
Jakob Werlin was buried at the Waldfriedhof in Traunstein after his death at age 79. His sons still operate Mercedes dealerships in Traunstein.
