= Winifred Wagner =

Wife of Siegfried Wagner (1897–1980)

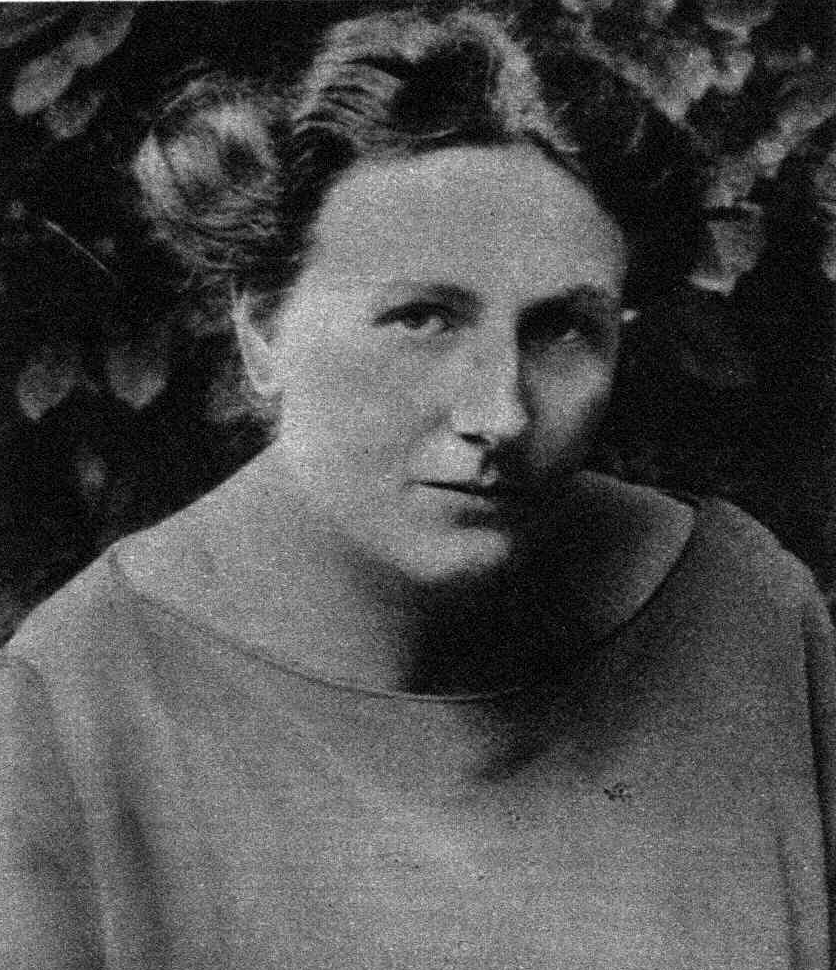
- Wagner in 1931
- Born: Winifred Marjorie Williams; 23 June 1897; Hastings, Sussex, England
- Died: 5 March 1980 (aged 82); Überlingen, West Germany
- Spouse: Siegfried Wagner (m. 1915; died 1930)
- Children: Wieland; Friedelind; Wolfgang; Verena

Winifred Marjorie Wagner (née Williams; 23 June 1897 – 5 March 1980) was the English-born wife of Siegfried Wagner, the son of Richard Wagner. She ran the Bayreuth Festival after her husband's death in 1930 until the end of World War II in 1945. She was a friend and supporter of Adolf Hitler, himself a Wagner enthusiast, and she and Hitler maintained a regular correspondence.

== Biography ==
=== Early life and marriage to Siegfried Wagner ===
Wagner was born Winifred Marjorie Williams in Hastings, to John Williams, a Welsh journalist and critic, and his English-Danish wife, Emily Florence Williams, née Karop. Orphaned before the age of two, she initially was raised in a number of homes. Eight years later, she was adopted by a distant German relative of her mother, Henrietta Karop, and her husband Karl Klindworth, a musician and a friend of Richard Wagner.

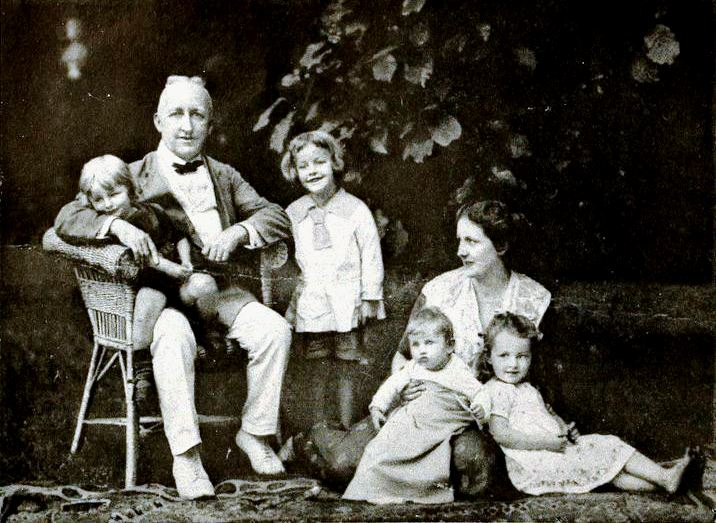
Siegfried Wagner and his family in 1922

The Bayreuth Festival was seen as a family business, with the leadership to be passed from Richard Wagner to his son Siegfried, but Siegfried, who was secretly bisexual, showed little interest in marriage. It was arranged that Winifred Klindworth, as she was called at the time, aged 17, would meet Siegfried Wagner, aged 45, at the Bayreuth Festival in 1914. A year later, they were married. It was hoped that the marriage would end Siegfried's homosexual encounters and the associated costly scandals and provide an heir to carry on the family business. Following their marriage on 22 September 1915, they had four children in rapid succession. After the death of Siegfried Wagner in 1930, Winifred Wagner took over the Bayreuth Festival, running it until the end of World War II.

=== Friendship with Adolf Hitler ===
In 1923, Winifred Wagner met Adolf Hitler, who greatly admired Richard Wagner's music. When Hitler was jailed for his part in the Munich Beer Hall Putsch, Wagner sent him food parcels and stationery, on which Hitler's autobiography Mein Kampf may have been written. Although Wagner remained personally faithful to Hitler, she denied that she had ever supported the Nazi Party. Her relationship with Hitler grew so close that by 1933 there were rumours of impending marriage (there were similar rumours about her love for English novelist Hugh Walpole).

Haus Wahnfried, the Wagner home in Bayreuth, became Hitler's favourite retreat. He stayed there on numerous occasions without his bodyguards, despite the fears of his SS colleagues. Hitler gave the Bayreuth festival government assistance and tax-exempt status, and treated Wagner's children solicitously.

According to biographer Brigitte Hamann, Wagner was reported to be "disgusted" by Hitler's persecution of the Jews. In one notable incident, in the late 1930s, a letter from her to Hitler prevented Hedwig and Alfred Pringsheim (whose daughter Katia was married to Thomas Mann) from being arrested by the Gestapo. Alfred Pringsheim was a fan of Richard Wagner, who he corresponded with and supported financially. He was also a patron of the Bayreuth Festival.

According to Gottfried Wagner, Winifred Wagner's grandson, she never admitted any error to her ways. After the war, her posthumous devotion to Hitler, whom she referred to as "USA" – for Unser Seliger Adolf (our blessed Adolf) – remained undimmed. She corresponded with Hitler for nearly two decades. Scholars have not been allowed to see the letters, which have been kept locked away by Amélie Lafferentz, one of Winifred Wagner's grandchildren, who has insisted that they not be released until the whole family agrees to do so.

=== Post-Bayreuth years ===
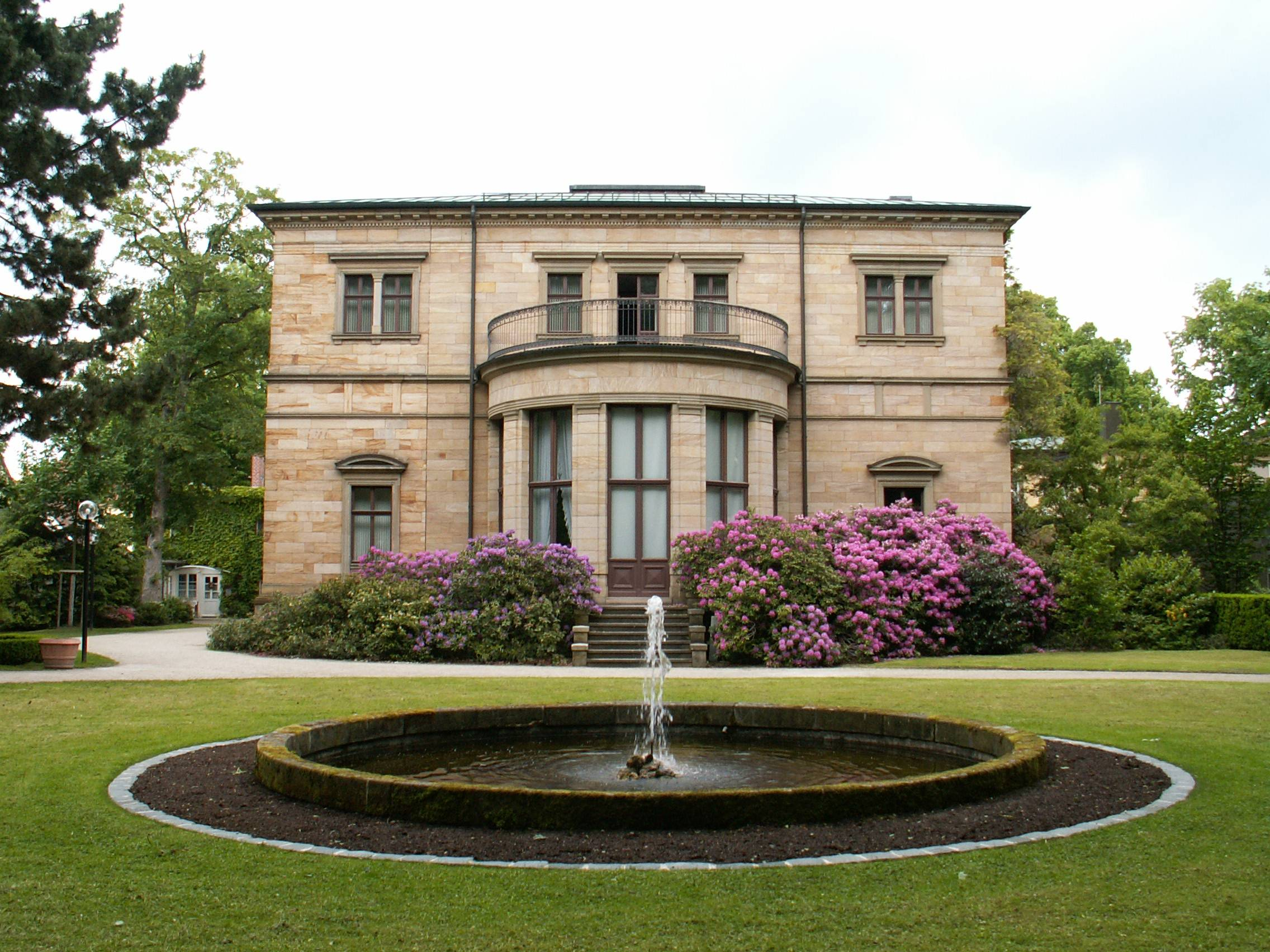
Wagner's home, Haus Wahnfried, the location of Hans-Jürgen Syberberg's 1976 documentary film Winifred Wagner und die Geschichte des Hauses Wahnfried 1914–1975

Like Hitler, Wagner believed profoundly in the rite of a secular cult of German nationalism, of Nordic self-realization, and völkisch aspiration. After the defeat of Nazi Germany, a denazification court banned her from the Bayreuth Festival, which she passed to her sons Wieland and Wolfgang. In the 1950s, she again became a political hostess. Her grandson Gottfried Wagner later recalled that

"My aunt Friedelind was outraged when my grandmother again slowly blossomed as the first lady of far-right groups and received political friends such as Emmy Göring, Ilse Hess, the former NPD Adolf von Thadden, Gerdy Troost, the wife of the Nazi architect and friend of Hitler Paul Ludwig Troost, the British fascist leader Oswald Mosley, the German NS-movie director Karl Ritter and the racist author and former Senator of the Reich Hans Severus Ziegler."

In 1975, Wagner gave a filmed interview to Hans-Jürgen Syberberg in which she appeared unrepentant concerning her past. "To have met him [Hitler]," she declared, "is an experience I would not have missed." She was interviewed that year by David Irving, who reported that she had said she would still welcome Hitler at her door, and that she had discussed with Hitler the saving of some individuals. She died in Überlingen on 5 March 1980 at the age of 82, and was interred at Bayreuth.

== In popular culture ==
The friendship of Wagner and Hitler is treated fancifully in A.N. Wilson's novel Winnie and Wolf (2007). The Music Keeper, an American play from 1982 by Elliot Tiber and André Ernotte, takes place two days before Wagner's death and is about her relationship with Hitler.

== See also ==
- Wagner family
