= Wieland Wagner =

German stage director and impresario (1917–1966)

- Born: 5 January 1917; Bayreuth, German Empire
- Died: 17 October 1966 (aged 49); Munich, West Germany
- Occupation: Opera director
- Known for: Member of Wagner family
- Children: 4, including Nike
- Parents: Siegfried Wagner; Winifred Wagner

Wieland Wagner (5 January 1917 – 17 October 1966) was a German opera director, and a grandson of Richard Wagner. As co-director of the Bayreuth Festival when it re-opened after World War II, he was noted for innovative new stagings of the musical stage works, departing from the naturalistic scenery and lighting of the 19th-century models.

== Life ==
Wieland Wagner was the elder of two sons of Siegfried and Winifred Wagner, grandson of composer Richard Wagner, and great-grandson of composer Franz Liszt through Wieland's paternal grandmother.

In 1941, he married the dancer and choreographer Gertrud Reissinger. They had four children: Iris (1942–2014), Wolf Siegfried (born 1943), Nike (born 1945) and Daphne (born 1946). Their son Wolf married Marie Eleanore von Lehndorff-Steinort, sister of fashion model Veruschka, whose father was involved in the 20 July plot to assassinate Hitler.

Late in life, Wieland had a love affair with Anja Silja, one of the singers he had recruited for Bayreuth.

In 1965, he was awarded the Pour le Mérite.

He died of lung cancer in October 1966.

== Career ==
Wieland Wagner is credited as an initiator of Regietheater through ushering in a new modern style to Wagnerian opera as a stage director and designer, substituting a symbolic for a naturalist staging and focusing on the psychology of the drama.

Wieland began his directorial career before World War II, working on operas by his father and grandfather. His innovative approach did not become clear until after the war. His design for the 1937 Bayreuth production of Parsifal, for example, was conservative, though it did have film projections during the transformation scenes.

When the Bayreuth Festival reopened after the war in 1951, Wieland and his brother Wolfgang became festival directors in place of their mother, whose association with Adolf Hitler had made her unacceptable. (Wieland's own past was, however, suppressed.) The revolutionary productions evoked extreme views both for and against.

Wieland's long-lasting 1951 production of Parsifal included many features with which he later would be identified. Post-war austerity and his own interest – influenced by Adolphe Appia – in lighting effects led to the use of round minimalist sets lit from above.

Wieland's first post-war Siegfried represented Fafner with a nine-metre (30 ft) statue of a dragon belching fire. In his later production of the opera he instead used pairs of giant eyes, which were picked out in turn from the back-projected forest, to suggest the movements of a huge creature stretching halfway down the Bayreuth hill.

Wieland's 1956 "Mastersingers without Nuremberg" was the symbolic culmination of his campaign to move away from naturalism in Wagner production with the medieval town represented by the cobbled shape of a street and, above the stage, a ball suggestive of a flowering tree.

Wieland's minimalism extended beyond the stage furniture and props. The performer of Gunther, for example, was expected to sing leaning forward in Act 1 of Götterdämmerung until he felt his authority challenged by Hagen and sat up straight. It is hard to imagine a greater contrast with traditional operatic acting.

Although Wieland is best remembered for productions of his grandfather's works at Bayreuth, he was often asked to work elsewhere in Germany and Europe. For example, he produced Tannhäuser and Der fliegende Holländer in Copenhagen, the Ring in Naples, Stuttgart and Cologne, and Beethoven's Fidelio in Stuttgart, London, Paris and Brussels.

Wieland's wife Gertrud collaborated with him to develop his interpretations of the operas and devise stage movement for the solo singers and chorus. Trained in modern dance, she is credited in the Bayreuth programs with choreography for Parsifal, Tannhäuser, and Die Meistersinger von Nürnberg, but in fact she assisted him in all of his Bayreuth productions and many that he staged elsewhere, sometimes taking rehearsals on her own. This was not revealed until after Wieland's death, and Wolfgang Wagner claims in his memoirs that it's not true. But biographer Renate Schostack recounts many particulars of this collaboration, as does the daughter of Wieland and Gertrud, Nike Wagner.

The great love of his life was the German soprano Anja Silja. Only twenty years old, she took over as Senta in 1960 in Bayreuth when Leonie Rysanek cancelled, and created a sensation. Blessed with a strong, agile, youthful and gleaming voice, and with an extraordinary talent for acting, she embodied Wieland's ideals. She sang Elsa in Lohengrin, Elisabeth and Venus in Tannhäuser and Eva in Meistersinger at Bayreuth. Elsewhere, he cast her as Isolde, Brünnhilde, Richard Strauss's Elektra, and Salome, and Alban Berg's Lulu and Marie in Wozzeck. She even sang Desdemona in Verdi's Otello in Wieland's production.

Among the other celebrated singers who worked with Wieland were Hans Hotter, George London, Dietrich Fischer-Dieskau, Eberhard Wächter, Thomas Stewart, Theo Adam, Josef Greindl, Jerome Hines, Wolfgang Windgassen, Ramón Vinay, Jess Thomas, Jon Vickers, Martha Mödl, Astrid Varnay, Régine Crespin, Rita Gorr, Leonie Rysanek, Regina Resnik, Birgit Nilsson, Jean Madeira, Grace Hoffman, Franz Crass, Victoria de los Ángeles, Grace Bumbry, Christa Ludwig, Martti Talvela, Carlos Alexander, Ruth Hesse, Isabel Strauß, Rosl Zapf, James King, Claude Heater, Ticho Parly, Dame Gwyneth Jones, and Fritz Wunderlich. Wieland wanted great actors, but he also wanted the singers to execute his plans faithfully.

Conductors with whom he collaborated were Hans Knappertsbusch, Clemens Krauss, Joseph Keilberth, André Cluytens, Pierre Boulez, Herbert von Karajan, Erich Leinsdorf, Heinz Tietjen, Lorin Maazel, Wolfgang Sawallisch, Karl Böhm, Bruno Maderna, and Thomas Schippers.

Wieland Wagner's life and work are discussed in Tony Palmer's 2011 film, The Wagner Family.

== Associations with Hitler and Nazism ==
His mother Winifred Wagner's close friendship with Hitler meant that, as a teenager and young man, Wieland knew the dictator as "Uncle Wolf". In 1938 he joined the Nazi Party on Hitler's personal insistence. From September 1944 to April 1945 he held a sinecure at the Institut für physikalische Forschung in Bayreuth, founded by his brother-in-law Bodo Lafferentz, which was a satellite of the Flossenbürg concentration camp devoted to research and development of an improved guidance system of the V-2 rocket bomb. This enabled him to avoid being called into the Wehrmacht for the final defense of Germany. At the Institut he built models of stage sets and developed new stage lighting systems with the assistance of prisoner Hans Imhof, an electrical technician. At his denazification hearing in Bayreuth, on 10 December 1948, he was classified as a "Mitläufer" (follower), the fourth and lowest category of those not exonerated, and fined DM100 plus the court costs.

== Videography ==
- Wagner: Tristan und Isolde (Nilsson, Windgassen, Töpper, Andersson, Hotter; Boulez, 1967) [live] Bayreuth Festival at Osaka International Festival
- Wagner: Die Walküre (Silja, Dernesch, G.Hoffman, Thomas, Adam, Nienstedt; Schippers, 1967) [live] Bayreuth Festival at Osaka International Festival
- Berg: Lulu (Silja, C.Alexander, Holm, Červená, Ferenz, Wildermann; Leitner, 1968) Stuttgart Staatsoper

== See also ==
- Wagner family tree
