= Siegfried Wagner =

German composer and conductor (1869–1930)

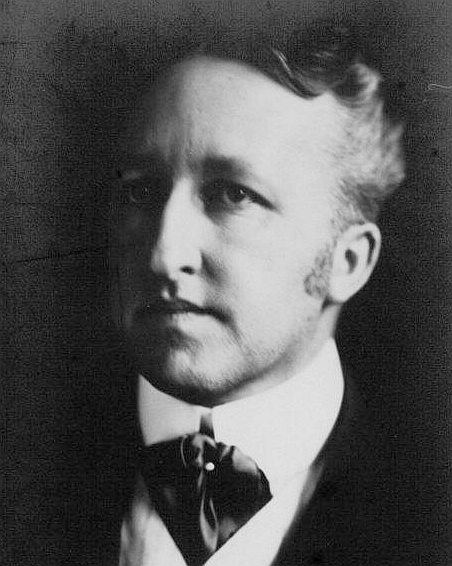
- Born: 6 June 1869; Tribschen, Switzerland
- Died: 4 August 1930 (aged 61); Bayreuth, Germany
- Occupations: Composer; Festival director
- Organizations: Bayreuth Festival
- Works: List of operas
- Spouse: Winifred Klindworth
- Children: Wieland Wagner; Friedelind Wagner; Wolfgang Wagner; Verena Wagner
- Parents: Richard Wagner; Cosima Wagner

Siegfried Helferich Richard Wagner (6 June 1869 – 4 August 1930) was a German composer and conductor, the son of Richard Wagner. He was an opera composer and the artistic director of the Bayreuth Festival from 1908 to 1930.

== Life ==
Siegfried Wagner was born in 1869 to Richard Wagner and his future wife Cosima (née Liszt), at Tribschen on Lake Lucerne in Switzerland. Through his mother, he was a grandson of Franz Liszt, from whom he received some instruction in harmony.

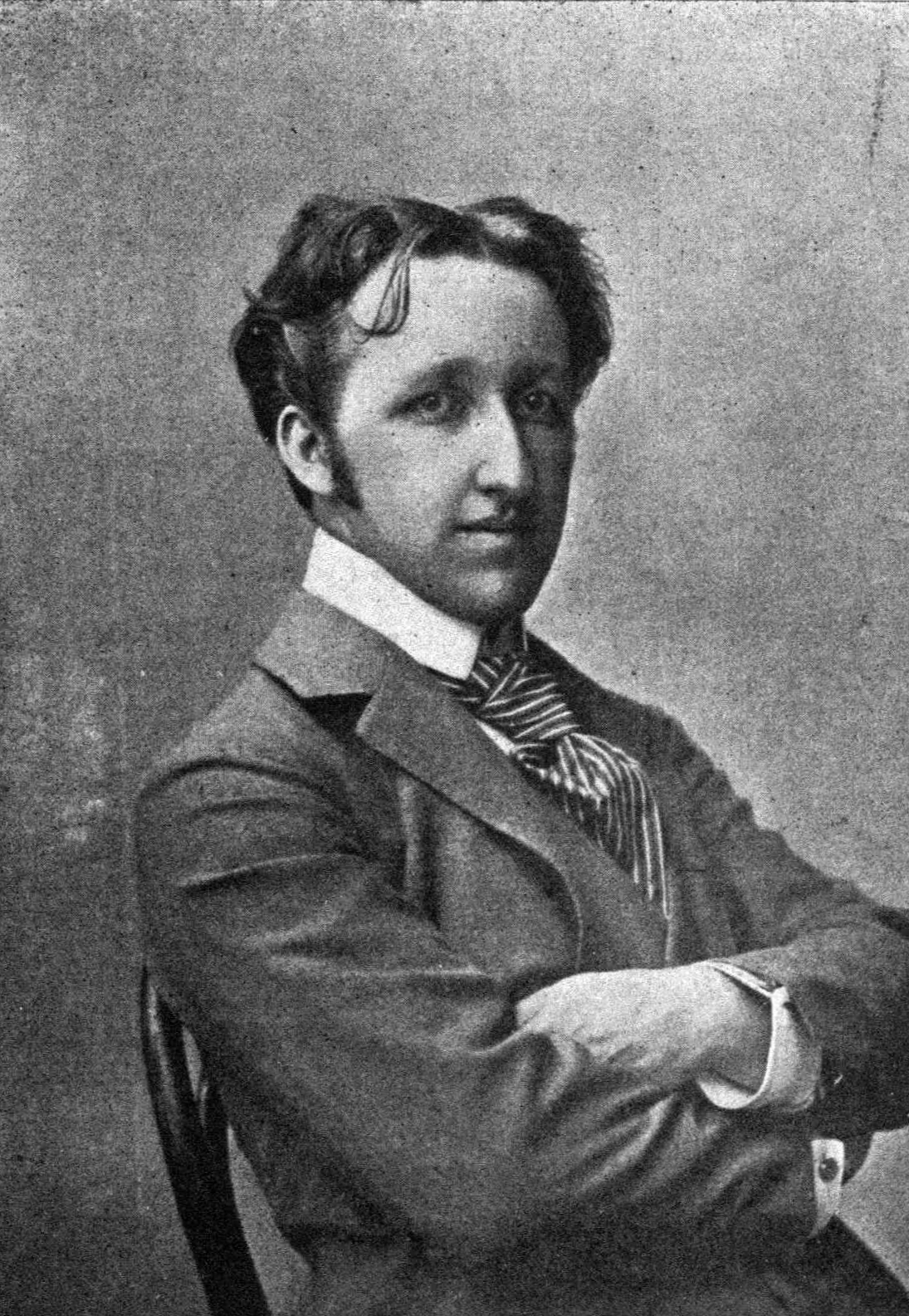
Siegfried Wagner in 1896

Some youthful compositions date from about 1882. After he completed his secondary education in 1889, he studied with Wagner's assistant Engelbert Humperdinck, but was more strongly drawn to a career as an architect and studied architecture in Berlin and Karlsruhe.

In 1892 he undertook a trip to Asia with a friend, the English composer Clement Harris. During the voyage he decided to abandon architecture and commit himself to music. Reputedly, it was also Harris who first aroused his homoerotic impulses. While on board, he sketched his first official work, the symphonic poem Sehnsucht, inspired by the poem of the same name by Friedrich Schiller. This piece was not completed until just before the concert in which Wagner conducted it in London on 6 June 1895. Though his works are numerous, none entered the standard repertory.

He made his conducting debut as an assistant conductor at Bayreuth in 1894; in 1896 he became associate conductor, sharing responsibility for conducting the Ring cycle with Felix Mottl and Hans Richter, who had conducted its premiere 20 years earlier. In 1908 he took over as artistic director of the Bayreuth Festival in succession to his mother, Cosima.

Wagner was bisexual. For years, his mother urged him to marry and provide the Wagner dynasty with heirs, but he fought off her increasingly desperate urgings.

Around 1913, pressure on him increased due to the Harden–Eulenburg affair (1907–1909), in which the journalist Maximilian Harden accused several public figures, most notably Philipp, Prince of Eulenburg, a friend of Kaiser Wilhelm II, of homosexuality. In this climate, the family found it suitable to arrange a marriage with a 17-year-old Englishwoman, Winifred Klindworth, and at the Bayreuth Festival of 1914 she was introduced to the then-45-year-old Wagner. The two married on 22 September 1915.

The couple had four children:

1. Wieland (1917–1966)
2. Friedelind (1918–1991)
3. Wolfgang (1919–2010)
4. Verena (1920–2019)

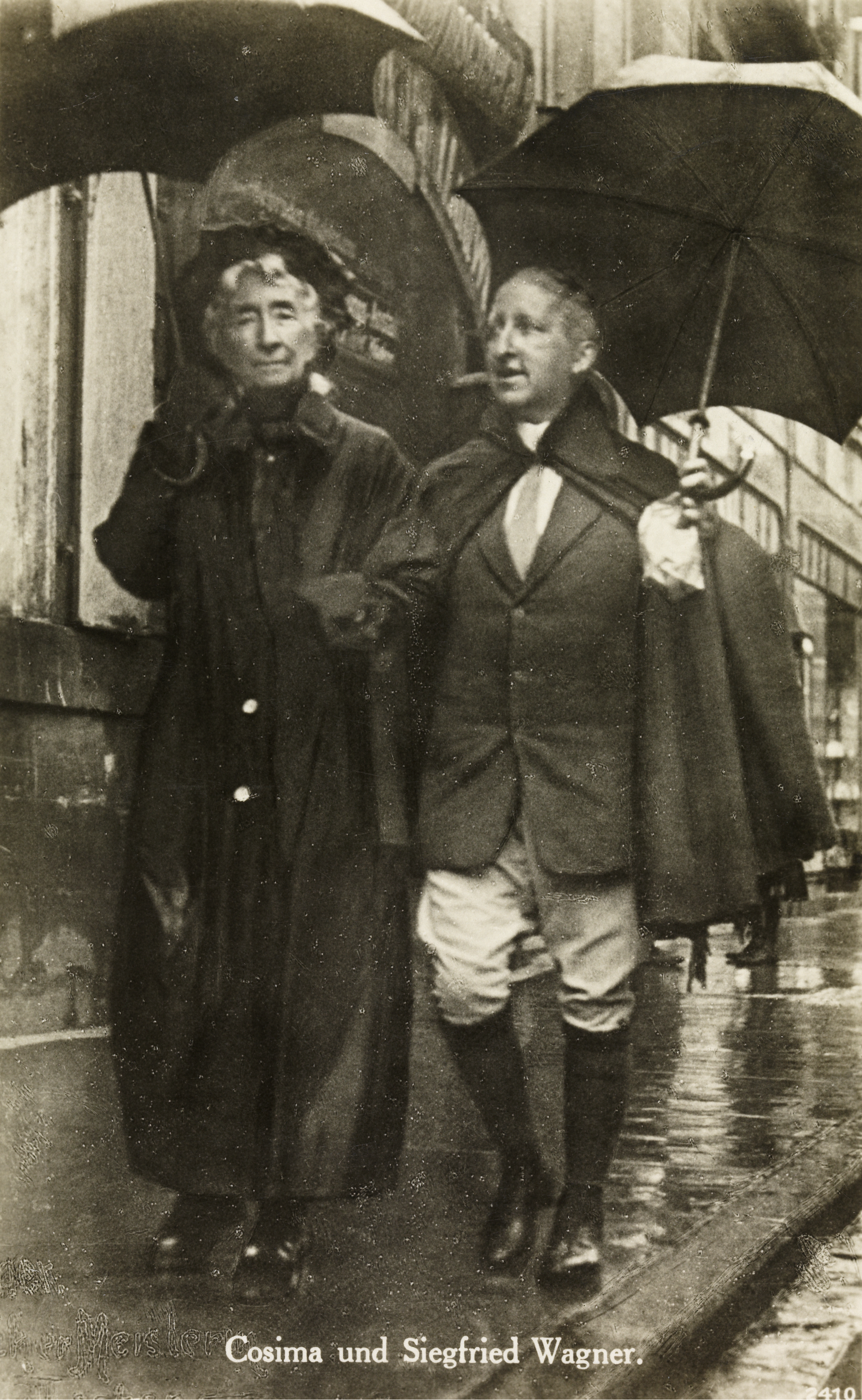
Cosima and Siegfried Wagner, c. 1929

Though the marriage provided for the dynastic succession, the hope that it would also bring an end to his homosexual encounters and the associated costly scandals was disappointing, as Wagner remained sexually active with other men.

Peter P. Pachl, one of Siegfried's biographers, asserted that Siegfried had sired an illegitimate son, Walter Aign (1901–1977); several recent authors, such as Frederic Spotts and Brigitte Hamann, have taken it up.

Wagner died in Bayreuth in 1930 aged 61, having outlived his mother by only four months. Since his two sons were still only adolescents, he was succeeded at the helm of the Bayreuth Festival by his widow Winifred.

== Works ==
=== Operas ===
- See List of operas by Siegfried Wagner

=== Orchestral works ===
- March for Gottfried der Spielmann (c. 1882)
- Orchestration of Ekloge from Liszt's Années de Pèlerinage (1890)
- Sehnsucht, symphonic poem after Schiller (1892–1895)
- Concertino for flute and small orchestra (1913)
- Violin Concerto (1915)
- Und wenn die Welt voll Teufel wär, scherzo for orchestra (1922)
- Glück, symphonic poem (1922–23) [dedicated to the memory of Clement Harris]
- Symphony in C major (1925, rev. 1927). (First version used the Prelude to Der Friedensengel as the slow movement, whereas a new movement was composed for the revised version. The scherzo is based on the sketches for an unfinished orchestral tone poem, Hans im Glück)

=== Vocal music ===
- 1890 "Abend auf dem Meere", for soprano and piano – text: Henry Thode
- 1890 "Frühlingsglaube", for soprano and piano – text: Ludwig Uhland
- 1890 "Abend am Meer" – text: Alfred Meissner
- 1897 "Schäfer und Schäferin"
- 1913 "Das Märchen vom dicken fetten Pfannekuchen", for solo voice and orchestra
- 1918 "Wahnfried-Idyll"
- 1919 "Nacht am Narocz", for tenor and piano – text: Günther Holstein
- 1922 "Ein Hochzeitslied für unseren Erich und seine liebe 'Dusi'"
- 1927 "Dryadenlied"
- 1927 "Weihnacht"
- "Frühlingsblick" – text: Nikolaus Lenau
- "Frühlingstod" – text: Nikolaus Lenau

== See also ==
- Wagner family
