= Ursula Zollenkopf =

German classical contralto singer

Ursula Zollenkopf is a German classical contralto singer. A member of the NDR Chor based in Hamburg, she appeared as a soloist in opera and concert, including premieres of contemporary music such as Stravinsky's Threni and Schoenberg's Moses und Aron.

== Career ==
Zollenkopf was a member of the choir of the German broadcaster Nordwestdeutscher Rundfunk (NWDR Chor, later the NDR Chor). In the 1950s, she appeared in solo operatic parts with the choir and NWDR orchestra conducted by Wilhelm Schüchter. These included Lady Pamela in Auber's Fra Diavolo in 1954, alongside Wilma Lipp, Rudolf Schock and James Pease; and in 1955 as Benjamin in Méhul's Joseph, with Libero de Luca in the title role. She performed as the alto soloist in a series of Bach cantatas, with members of the NDR Chor and the Hamburger Rundfunkorchester conducted by Max Thurn, for example the Easter cantata Erfreut euch, ihr Herzen, BWV 66, in 1957.

Zollenkopf appeared in the role of the mother in the premiere of Hans Werner Henze's radio opera Ein Landarzt in 1951. She sang as a soloist and in the choir at the première of Arnold Schoenberg's unfinished opera Moses und Aron at the Musikhalle Hamburg on 12 March 1954. Hans Rosbaud conducted the choirs and orchestra of the NWDR, with Hans Herbert Fiedler in the speaking role of Moses and Helmut Krebs as Aron. She appeared as a soloist and in choir in Stravinsky's Threni at the hall of the Scuola Grande di San Rocco in Venice on 23 September 1958, where the composer conducted the NDR Chor and the NDR Sinfonieorchester, with soloists Jeanne Deroubaix, Hugues Cuénod, Richard Robinson, Charles Scharbach and Robert Oliver.

She appeared as a soloist in various choral concerts, such as Bach's Mass in B minor and Christmas Oratorio (1961), his St Matthew Passion (1967) and St John Passion (1968) in Bonn with the choir and chamber orchestra of the Bonner Bach Gemeinschaft (Bonn Bach society), conducted by Gustav Classens. With the Itzehoer Konzertchor, she sang in Handel's Messiah, conducted by Otto Spreckelsen at St. Laurentii, Itzehoe, in 1963, among others.

She participated in the Internationale Ferienkurse für Neue Musik in Darmstadt in 1964, performing in Golem, subtitled Polemic for nine singers (1962) by Hans G. Helms, conducted by Fred Barth. In 1959 she recorded the alto part of Beethoven's Ninth Symphony with Ingeborg Wenglor, Hans-Joachim Rotzsch, and Theo Adam, choir of Radio Leipzig (now MDR Chor) and the Gewandhausorchester conducted by Franz Konwitschny.
