= Ein Landarzt (opera) =

Opera by Hans Werner Henze

- Opera by Hans Werner Henze
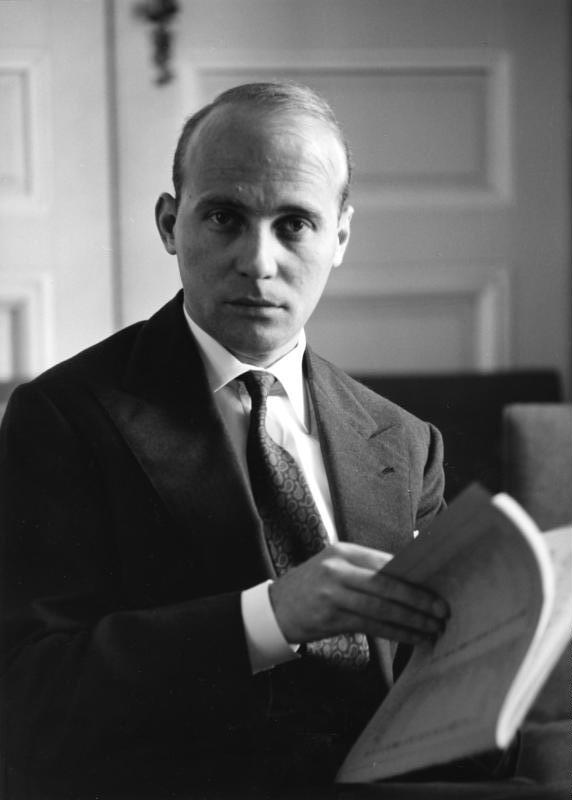
- The composer in 1960
- Librettist: Hans Werner Henze
- Language: German
- Based on: Franz Kafka's "Ein Landarzt"
- Premiere: 19 November 1951; NWDR, Hamburg

Ein Landarzt (A Country Doctor) is a one-act chamber opera composed by Hans Werner Henze. The libretto was written by Henze and is closely based on Kafka's 1917 short story "Ein Landarzt". The work was originally composed as a radio opera and premiered on 19 November 1951 in a broadcast by Nordwestdeutscher Rundfunk. Henze subsequently revised the work in 1964 both as a monodrama for baritone and chamber orchestra and as a one-act staged opera. The stage version was premiered by the Oper Frankfurt on 30 November 1965.

== Background and performance history ==
=== Radio opera version ===
The original version of Ein Landarzt was composed specifically for radio performance and was a commission from the German public radio network Nordwestdeutscher Rundfunk (NWDR). It premiered as an NWDR radio broadcast from Hamburg on 19 November 1951 with Hans Herbert Fiedler in the title role and Harry Hermann Spitz conducting the NWDR Symphony Orchestra. In 1953 the opera was entered in the Prix Italia where it received the Premio RAI. Henze reworked the opera into two further versions in 1964, a monodrama and a stage version. The original radio opera was itself revised by Henze in 1994 with a narrator added and some of the original radiophonic effects removed from the score. This revised version premiered in a Westdeutscher Rundfunk (WDR) broadcast from Cologne on 27 September 1996 with Roland Hermann in the title role and Markus Stenz conducting the WDR Symphony Orchestra. Henze himself took the role of narrator. The 1996 performance was subsequently released on CD in 2005 coupled with another one-act opera by Henze, Das Ende einer Welt.

=== Monodrama version ===
In 1964, Henze reworked the radio opera version as a vehicle for Dietrich Fischer-Dieskau. This version, scored for solo baritone and chamber orchestra, was premiered by Fischer-Dieskau in a performance in Berlin on 13 October 1965 with Henze conducting the Berlin Philharmonic. This version in English translation as A Country Doctor was performed in a semi-staged production at London's St. Pancras Arts Festival in 1966. The monodrama was revived by the Guildhall School of Music and Drama on 8 June 2015, again in a semi-staged production, with Martin Hässler in the title role and Timothy Redmond conducting the Guildhall Orchestra.

=== Stage version ===
The stage version, re-worked from the radio opera by Henze in 1964, premiered at the Oper Frankfurt on 30 November 1965 in a double bill with the premiere of his Das Ende einer Welt. The production was designed and directed by Hans Neugebauer with Ernst Gutstein in the title role and Wolfgang Rennert conducting. Its US premiere was in 1968 at the Aspen Music Festival performed in English translation as A Country Doctor. Later performances include Amsterdam (1970), Angers (1971), Hobart (1974), and Munich (2006).

== Synopsis ==
A country doctor is summoned to a house 10 miles away where a young boy is seriously ill. He asks his maid Rosa to find him a horse, but she returns unsuccessful. A mysterious stable boy appears bringing a team of fine horses and promptly assaults Rosa, kissing and biting her. The doctor is magically transported to the patient's house by the horses but is deeply troubled by having left Rosa in the hands of the boorish stable boy. The young patient, who has a deep wound in his side, begs the doctor to let him die. The boy's family forcibly undress the doctor and make him lie in the boy's bed, threatening to kill him if the boy is not healed. The doctor manages to escape on one of the horses but, as if in a nightmare, finds himself unable to return home and condemned to travel for eternity. (Note: The synopsis is based on Kafka's original story to which the libretto closely adhered.) (Note: In the monodrama version the entire story is recounted by the country doctor as if he were hallucinating.)

== Roles ==
Role	Voice type	Radio version Premiere cast 19 November 1951 (Note: (Broadcast 29 November)) (Conductor: Harry Hermann Spitz)	Stage version Premiere cast 30 November 1965 (Conductor: Wolfgang Rennert)	Monodrama Premiere cast{ 13 October 1965 (Conductor: Hans Werner Henze)
A country doctor	baritone	Hans Herbert Fiedler	Ernst Gutstein	Dietrich Fischer-Dieskau
Rosa, the doctor's maid	soprano	Cläre Autenrieth	Marlise Wendels	
Stable boy	tenor	Horst Günter		
The patient	boy soprano	Rüdiger Prohl		
The mother	contralto	Ursula Zollenkopf		
The father	bass	Ernst Max Lühr		
The daughter	soprano	Cläre Autenrieth		
Chorus of children outside the patient's house
