= Helmut Franz =

German conductor (1911–2002)

- Born: 1911
- Died: 30 January 2002 (aged 90–91)
- Occupations: Choral conductor; Academic teacher
- Organizations: NDR Chor; Musikhochschule Hamburg

Helmut Franz (1911 – 30 January 2002) was a German academic teacher and conductor who was known particularly for his work as a choral conductor. He was the director of NDR Chor, based in Hamburg, from 1966 to 1987, focused on a cappella music and contemporary classical music.

== Career ==
Franz was Kapellmeister at the Hessisches Landestheater in Darmstadt and lecturer at the Akademie für Tonkunst there, when he became director of the NDR Chor, the choir of the broadcaster Norddeutscher Rundfunk (NDR) based in Hamburg. He succeeded Max Thurn who retired at the end of 1965. Franz was known for his focus on a cappella music and contemporary music. He established a concert series "das neue werk" (the new work). He conducted in 1967 György Ligeti's Lux aeterna for a 16-part choir a cappella, which became known as music for Stanley Kubrick's 2001: A Space Odyssey. The recording has been included as part of a collection Avantgarde by Deutsche Grammophon, released in 1968, and other collections of contemporary music. Premieres with the NDR Chor included Penderecki's Utrenja and Hanz Werner Henze's Das Floß der Medusa (The Raft of the Medusa) in 1968 which was interrupted by political protests in the audience. During the 1970s, the choir was a guest at several festivals, including Karlheinz Stockhausen's Atmen gibt das Leben, performed in Maribor, Zagreb and Sarajewo.

Franz described the function of the NDR Chor: "Der Rundfunkchor ist eine Gruppe von Spezialisten, die sich den höchsten Aufgaben widmen, die ein Chor zu leisten fähig ist. Der Chor hat natürlich durch seine Elitefunktion die Aufgabe, vor allem moderne Werke zu singen, die andere Chöre aus zeitlichen Gründen oder aus Fähigkeitsgründen nicht pflegen können." (The radio choir is a group of specialists devoted to the highest achievements. The choir is naturally obliged by its elite function to mainly sing modern works which other choirs can not perform for reasons of time or ability.)

Franz was also a professor of opera at the Hochschule für Musik und Theater in Hamburg.

He was married to Thyra Franz (née Sthamer and only daughter of the Hamburg composer Heinrich Sthamer) The marriage produced two sons.
