= Rieth =

Rieth may refer to:

- Rieth, a district of the German city of Erfurt
- Rieth, a district of the German town of Luckow
- Rieth, Oregon, unincorporated community in Umatilla County, Oregon
- Rieth (surname)
- Andreas Rieth Homestead, historic home in Pennsylvania
