= Rosl Zapf =

Austrian mezzo-soprano (1925–2019)

- Born: 17 February 1925; Hof, Land Salzburg, Austria
- Died: 1 March 2019 (aged 94); Hof, Land Salzburg, Austria
- Occupation: Operatic mezzo-soprano
- Organizations: Oper Frankfurt

Rosl Zapf (17 February 1925 (Note: 1921 according to other sources) – 1 March 2019) was an Austrian operatic mezzo-soprano. She was a member of the Oper Frankfurt from 1950 to 1976, where she appeared in leading roles such as Herodias in Salome. She took part in world premieres such as Luise Talma's Die Alkestiade and Uno sguardo dal ponte by Renzo Rossellini. She performed at leading opera houses internationally, including La Monnaie in Brussels, Teatro Nacional de São Carlos in Lisbon and the Paris Opéra.

== Life ==
Born in Hof, Land Salzburg, Zapf studied voice in Graz with Stoja von Milinković. She had her first engagement from 1945 to 1949 at the Landestheater Salzburg. After a short engagement at the Bavarian State Opera, she was a soloist at the Oper Frankfurt from 1950 where she was a permanent member until she retired from the stage in 1976, becoming one of the most popular members of the ensemble. On 1 July 1950, she appeared in a performance of Krenek's Leben des Orest as part of the Darmstädter Ferienkurse, conducted by Bruno Vondenhoff. She took part in the German first performances of Hindemith's Cardillac in 1952. In 1953, she appeared as Herodias in a production of Salome by Richard Strauss conducted by Georg Solti, with Inge Borkh in the title role, Rudolf Gonszar as Jochanaan and Bernd Aldenhoff as Herod. In 1962, she took part in the world premiere of Louise Talma's Die Alkestiade, and of Uno sguardo dal ponte by Renzo Rossellini in 1962. In the 1965/66 season, she appeared in the first staged performance of the radio operas Das Ende einer Welt (as Marchesa) and Ein Landarzt (as the Mother) by Hans Werner Henze.

Among her most important roles were Cherubino and (later) Marcellina in Mozart's Le nozze di Figaro, Frau Reich in Die lustigen Weiber von Windsor, Hänsel in Hänsel und Gretel, Azucena in Verdi's Il trovatore, Amneris in Aida and Mrs. Quickly in Falstaff. She also performed as Magdalene in Kienzl's Der Evangelimann, Mrs. Herring in Britten's Albert Herring, Countess Geschwitz in Alban Berg's Lulu and the Landlady in Mussorgsky's Boris Godunov. Zapf was also a concert alto, and occasionally appeared in operettas, for example Czipra in Der Zigeunerbaron by Johann Strauss.

Zapf performed at La Monnaie in 1954. In 1956, she appeared at the Salzburg Festival, as the Third Lady in Mozart's Die Zauberflöte, conducted by Solti. She performed at the Teatro Nacional de São Carlos (1959) in Lisbon and at the Paris Opéra.

Circa 1958, Zapf recorded excerpts from Aida (as Amneris), conducted by Carl Bamberger.

Zapf died in Hof bei Salzburg at the age of 94.
