= Fuschlsee =

Lake in Salzburg, Austria

Fuschlsee Lake Fuschl
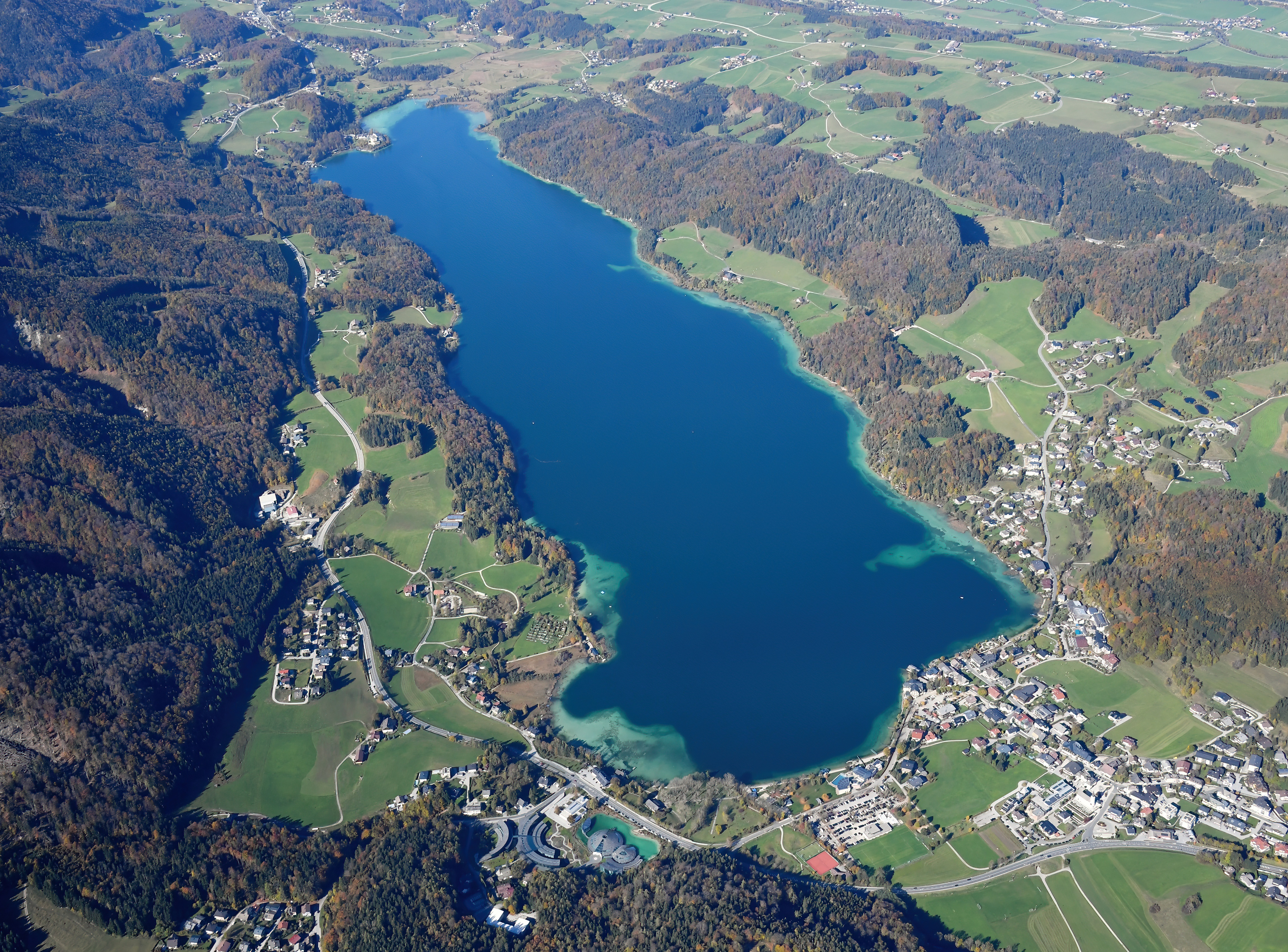
- Aerial view of Fuschlsee

- Location within Austria
- Location: Salzkammergut, Austria, EU
- Coordinates: 47°48′10″N 13°16′20″E
- Basin countries: Austria
- Max. length: 4.1 km (2.5 mi)
- Max. width: 0.9 km (0.56 mi)
- Surface area: 2.7 km^{2} (1.0 sq mi)
- Max. depth: 66 m (217 ft)
- Surface elevation: 664 m (2,178 ft)
- Settlements: Fuschl am See

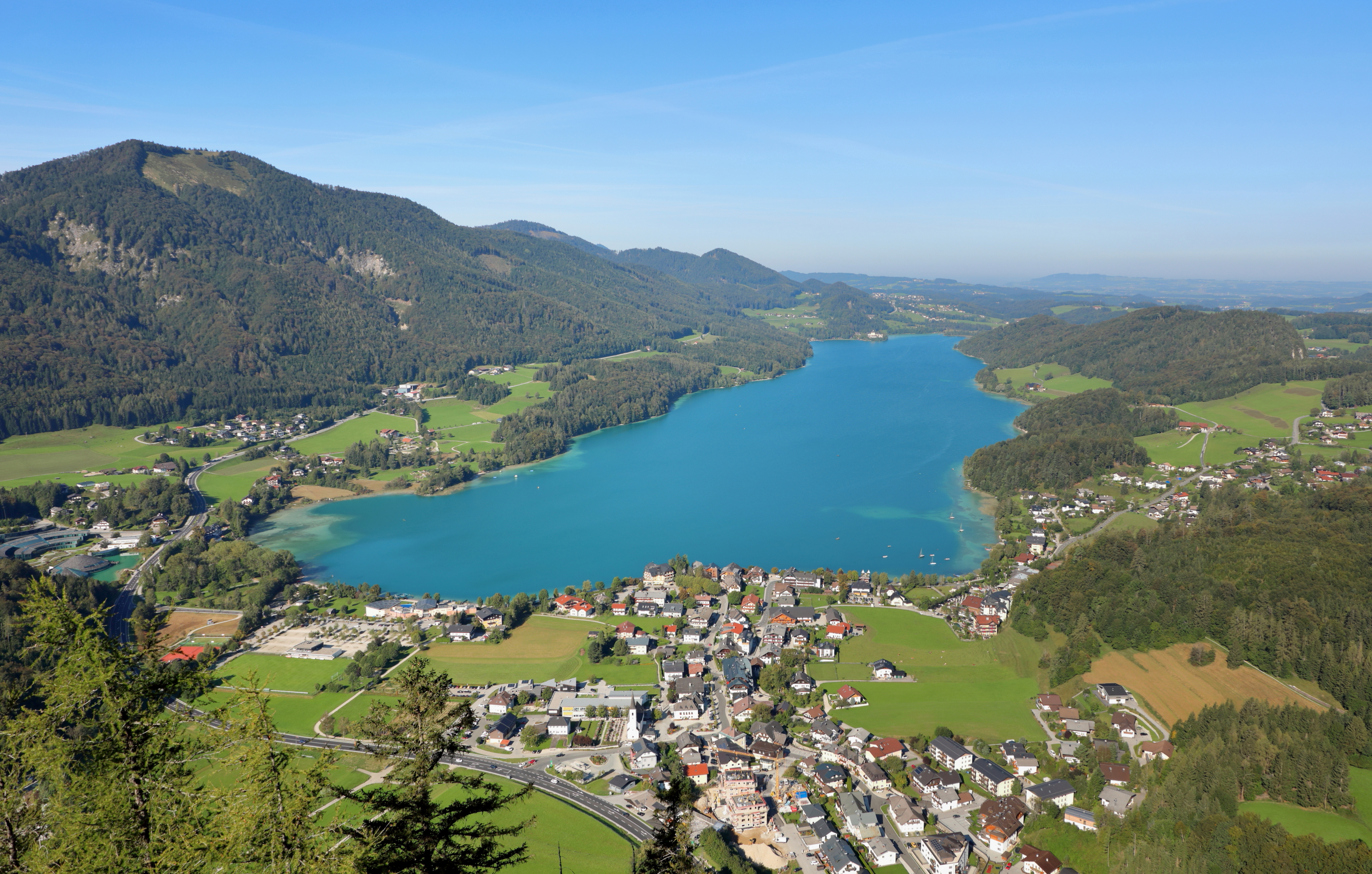
Fuschlsee seen from Ellmaustein

Fuschlsee (Englisch sometimes: Lake Fuschl) is a lake in the Salzburg part of the Salzkammergut region. It lies at an elevation of 663 m.a.A. The town centre of the municipality of Fuschl am See is situated on its eastern shore. The outlet of the Fuschlsee is the Fuschler Ache, which flows into Lake Mondsee and, via lake Attersee, the Ager and Traun river, into the Danube. The lake is owned by the Austrian Federal Forests.

== Geography ==
The lakes area is approximately 2.7 km² and its maximum depth is 66 metres. Situated on the lake are the villages of Fuschl am See, the municipality of Hof bei Salzburg, which includes Schloss Fuschl and the settlement of Hallbach, and the municipality of Thalgau, which includes the settlement of Egg-Hundsmarkt.

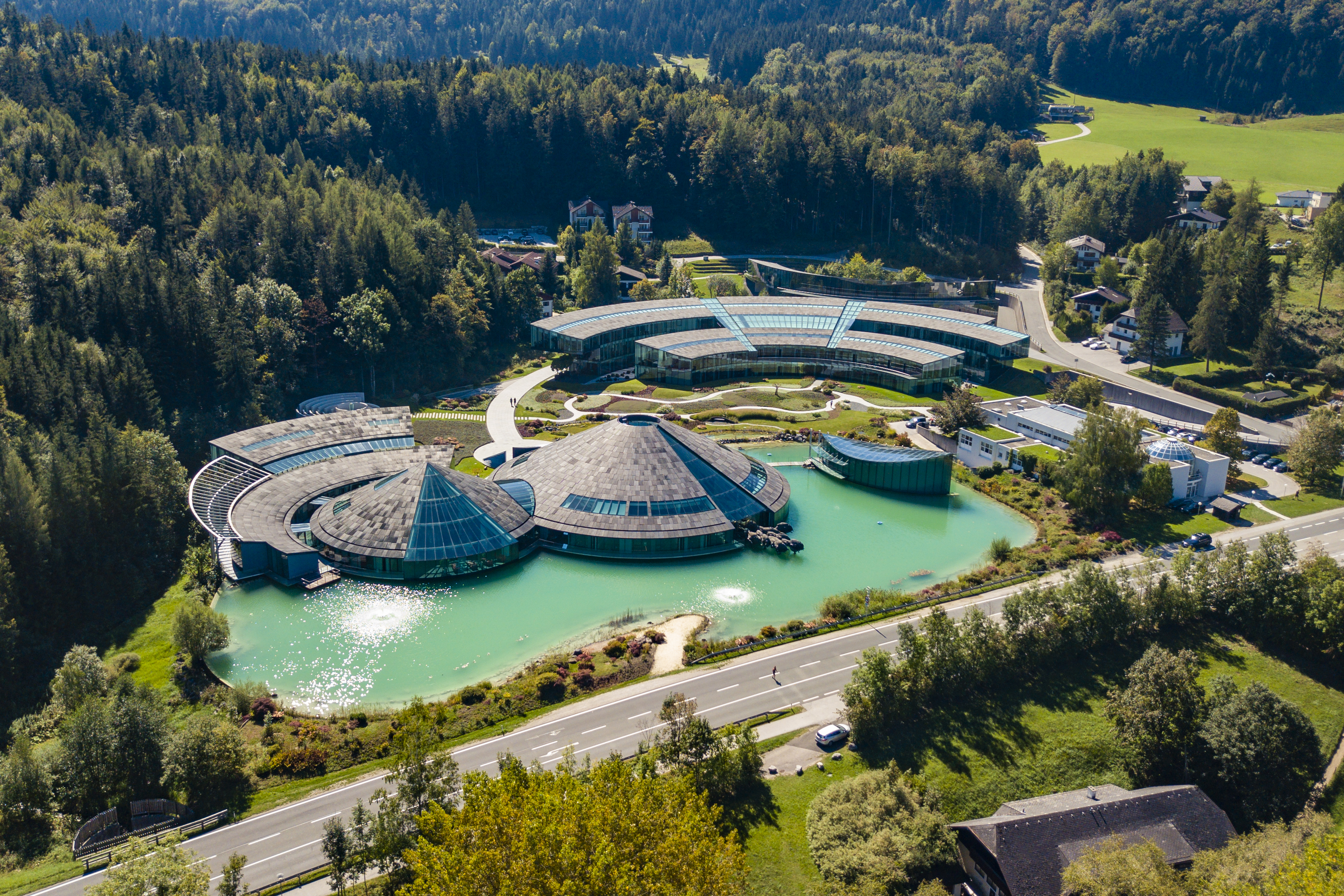
Red Bull's global HQ at the southeastern end of Fuschlsee

On the clam south-eastern shore of the lake lies the global headquarters the Red Bull parent company Red Bull GmbH making upwards of 12 billion Euro annually.

== Limnology ==
The lake has good water quality and underwater vegetation that has been well preserved in its natural state.

== Nature conservation ==
At its north-western end lies the Fuschlsee bog (nature reserve).

== See also ==
- Fuschl am See
