= Threni =

Threni may refer to:

- Latinized form of Greek Threnus ('lament'), an alternate name for the Book of Lamentations
- Threni (Stravinsky), Igor Stravinsky's 1958 musical setting of excerpts from the above
