= Morning service =

Morning service (a worship that is held in the morning) may refer to:

- Shacharit in Judaism
- Fajr, prayer in Islam
- Utrenja, a Polish liturgical composition
- Morning Prayer of the Anglican church
- In Wasei-eigo, breakfast special (ja:モーニングサービス)
