= The Alcestiad =

Opera by Louise Talma, 1962

The Alcestiad Die Alkestiade
- Opera by Louise Talma
- Librettist: Thornton Wilder
- Language: English; German
- Based on: Wilder's play
- Premiere: 1 March 1962; Oper Frankfurt

The Alcestiad is an opera in three acts by Louise Talma to a libretto that Thornton Wilder wrote based on his 1955 play of the same name. It premiered in German as Die Alkestiade at the Oper Frankfurt on 1 March 1962. It was the first full-length opera by an American woman staged at a major European opera house.

== History ==
The American composer Louise Talma collaborated with Thornton Wilder, who created the libretto based on his 1955 play The Alcestiad: Or, a Life in the Sun (1955) which was in turn based on Alcestis by Euripides. It was Wilder's idea to set the plot to music and approach Talma. She delivered sketches already in 1955, which Wilder approved. Talma composed the work in three acts and used serial composition techniques.

Wilder managed to interest Harry Buckwitz of the Städtische Bühnen Frankfurt in the world premiere. Wilder, who was awarded the Friedenspreis des Deutschen Buchhandels (peace prize of the German book trade) in 1957, was well received in Germany. The opera premiered on 1 March 1962 at the Oper Frankfurt, in a German version Die Alkestiade by Herberth Herlischka. It was directed by Harry Buckwitz, and conducted by Wolfgang Rennert. It was the first full-length opera by an American woman staged at a major European opera house. The first performance was not critically acclaimed, but nevertheless covered by the international press, including The New York Times and the Salzburger Nachrichten. Critics from the FAZ and the Los Angeles Times wrote that, while the music was skillfully crafted, the libretto was "too strong" for music. The music was described as influenced by Schoenberg, Honegger and Stravinsky, with "harsh brass dissonances and shattering percussion effects".

The opera remained Talma's only composition for the stage.

== Roles ==
Roles, voice types, premiere cast
Role	Voice type	Premiere cast, 1 March 1962
Alkestis	soprano	Inge Borkh
Aglaia (her servant)	mezzo-soprano	Rosl Zapf
Admettos (her husband)	baritone	Ernst Gutstein
Epimenes (their son)	baritone	Hans Wilbrink
Tiresias	tenor	Max Lorenz
Herkules	baritone	Leonardo Wolovsky
Agis	bass	Peter Lagger
Apollo	tenor	Richard Holm
