= Rieth (surname) =

Rieth is a German surname. Notable people with the surname include:

- Bill Rieth (1916–1999), American football player
- Glenn K. Rieth (born 1957), American soldier
- Hermann Rieth, German opera singer

== See also ==
- Andreas Rieth Homestead, historic home in Pennsylvania
