= Peter Lagger =

Swiss operatic bass

- Born: 7 September 1926; Buchs, St. Gallen, Switzerland
- Died: 17 September 1979 (aged 53); Berlin
- Education: Conservatory of Zürich; Wiener Musikakademie
- Occupation: Operatic bass
- Organizations: Deutsche Oper Berlin
- Title: Kammersänger

Peter Lagger (7 September 1926 – 17 September 1979) was a Swiss bass in opera and concert. He was a member of European opera houses, finally the Deutsche Oper Berlin, and appeared as a guest internationally. He took part in world premieres such as Louise Talma's Die Alkestiade at the Oper Frankfurt, and Henze's Die Bassariden and Penderecki's Magnificat, both at the Salzburg Festival.

== Life ==
=== Training ===
Born in Buchs, St. Gallen, Lagger first studied the piano at the conservatory of Zürich, then at the Wiener Musikakademie and in Italy. He finally trained his voice with Marko Rothmüller and Sylvia Gähwiller, and in Vienna with Hans Duhan.

=== Career ===
Lagger began his career at the Graz Opera, continued at the Zürich Opera House from 1955 to 1957. He was then engaged at the Staatstheater Wiesbaden, and from 1959 at the Oper Frankfurt. In 1962, he appeared there in the world premiere of Louise Talma's Die Alkestiade. Finally, he moved in 1963 to the Deutsche Oper Berlin, where he remained until his death. In 1967, he first appeared there in Berlin in the title role of Mussorgsky's Boris Godunov.

Lagger made an international career, appearing at the Glyndebourne Festival Opera first in 1957. At the Salzburg Festival, he performed Bartolo in Mozart's Le nozze di Figaro from 1963 to 1964, and Banco in Verdi's Macbeth in 1964. In August 1966, he appeared there at the world premiere of Henze's Die Bassariden. In 1974, he performed there again the only solo part in the premiere of Penderecki's Magnificat, conducted by the composer.

Lagger appeared as a guest also at the Vienna State Opera as well as in Munich, Paris, Lyon, Rio de Janeiro, Warsaw, Naples, Aix-en-Provence, Lucerne, Orange and Madrid.

In addition to his career in opera, Lagger also appeared as a concert singer; his repertoire ranged from works by Johann Sebastian Bach to works by modern composers. He also performed with many orchestras and in recitals worldwide. In the summer of 1979 he appeared for the last time, as Daland in Wagner's Der fliegende Holländer.

He died in Berlin at age 53.

=== Family ===
Lagger grew up in Switzerland, but his family is Italian on his father's side and Russian on his mother's. Lagger's brother (born 1938), who worked under the stage name Alexander Malta, made a career as a bass-baritone, mainly at the Bavarian State Opera and the Staatstheater Stuttgart.

== Awards ==
Lagger received the honorary title Kammersänger from the Berlin Senate in 1970. In 1977, he received an honorary doctorate from Yale University.

== Recordings ==
- Philips: Russian folk songs; English and German folk songs and Lieder by Franz Schubert
- Columbia: Orff's Der Mond
- Deutsche Grammophon: Mozart's Le nozze di Figaro, Wagner's Die Meistersinger von Nürnberg, Bruckner's Te Deum
- Eurodisc: Beethoven's Fidelio
- Philips RCA: Penderecki's Utrenja
- HMV Electrola: Mozart's Don Giovanni
- Orfeo: Verdi's Macbeth
- Disco-Jecklin: Frank Martin's Requiem
- GAM: Meyerbeer's Le prophète
- Westminster-Decca: Bach's St Matthew Passion, conducted by Hermann Scherchen (1953)
- Topaz-Video: Tchaikavsky's Eugene Onegin
