= Der biblische Weg =

1926 play by Arnold Schoenberg

Der biblische Weg (The Biblical Way) is a 1926 play by Arnold Schoenberg.

The plot of the drama deals with political aspirations in a modern setting, the downfall of the chief protagonist comes about through his attempt to combine the principles of both Moses and Aaron. Schoenberg used the play as an instrument of propaganda to promote the idea of a militant United Jewish Party. Although the play shares a biblical source of inspiration with Schoenberg's opera Moses und Aron, the play, a largely political work, has a very different focus from that of the opera, which is concerned chiefly with questions of theology and aesthetics.
