= Threni (Stravinsky) =

Musical composition by Stravinsky

- id est Lamentationes Jeremiae Prophetae
- Cantata by Igor Stravinsky
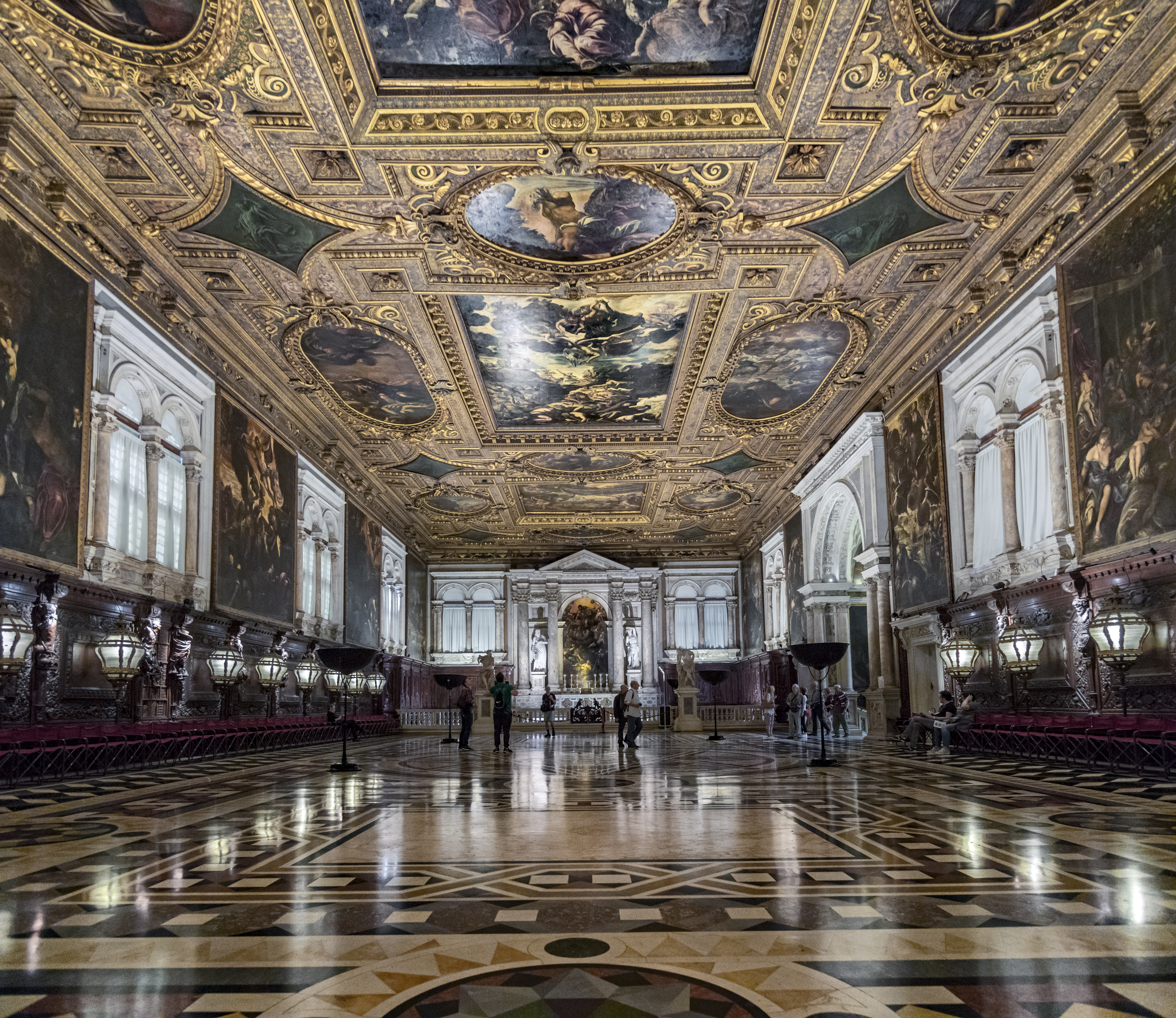
- The hall at the Scuola Grande di San Rocco in Venice, where the piece was premiered
- Text: Verses from Book of Lamentations
- Language: Latin
- Performed: 23 September 1958: Scuola Grande di San Rocco
- Published: 1958
- Recorded: 5 January 1959–6 January 1959 The Schola Cantorum (Hugh Ross, chorus master); Columbia Symphony Orchestra Igor Stravinsky, cond. (LP, 1 disc, 33⅓ rpm 12 in., monaural. Columbia Masterworks ML 5383)
- Movements: 3
- Scoring: soloists; choir; orchestra

Threni: id est Lamentationes Jeremiae Prophetae, usually referred to simply as Threni, is a musical setting by Igor Stravinsky of verses from the Book of Lamentations in the Latin of the Vulgate, for solo singers, chorus and orchestra. It is Stravinsky's first and longest completely dodecaphonic work, but is not often performed. It has been called "austere" but also a "culminating point" in his career, "important both spiritually and stylistically" and "the most ambitious and structurally the most complex" of all his religious compositions, and even "among Stravinsky's greatest works".

Stravinsky composed Threni in 1957–58 for the Venice Biennale, and it was first performed there in September 1958. A performance in Paris two months later was a disaster, attributed to inadequate performers and insufficient rehearsals. It led to mutual recriminations between Stravinsky, Pierre Boulez, and Robert Craft. Threni was first published in 1958 and first recorded in 1959, conducted by the composer.

As Threni was intended for concert rather than liturgical use, Stravinsky chose the text freely from the early chapters of the Book of Lamentations. It has three movements, a large central movement surrounded by two much shorter ones. Ernst Krenek composed a setting of the Lamentations in 1942, which Stravinsky acknowledged might have influenced him. He considered it less likely that works by Renaissance composers, including Tallis, Byrd and Palestrina, had influenced him, although he had studied such music.

== History ==
Stravinsky composed Threni between the summer of 1957 and the spring of 1958, beginning it on 29 August 1957 at the piano of the nightclub in the hotel where he was staying in Venice, and completing it before 27 March 1958. It was first performed on 23 September 1958 in the hall of the Scuola Grande di San Rocco, Venice. The composer conducted soloists Ursula Zollenkopf, Jeanne Deroubaix, Hugues Cuénod, Richard Robinson, Charles Scharbach, and Robert Oliver, the NDR Chor, and the NDR Sinfonieorchester. He dedicated the performance to Alessandro Piovesan, director of the Venice Biennale, who had recently died.

The first Paris performance, on 14 November 1958, was disastrous. According to Stephen Walsh, Boulez failed to obtain adequate performers, and those he could obtain broke down several times. The audience response was polite at first, but when Stravinsky refused to return and take a bow, it gradually descended into jeers. Stravinsky said he would never conduct in Paris again. He felt humiliated by what he called a "scandalous concert", writing in his diary immediately after the performance that it was the "unhappiest concert of my life" and blaming Boulez for it. Craft adds that Boulez had promised to rehearse Threni, but failed to do so. Stravinsky nevertheless had a share in the blame for not canceling the concert despite the pleas of family and friends, including his wife and Nadia Boulanger. Conceding that the performance was a "catastrophe", Boulez nevertheless insisted that he had in fact participated in the piano rehearsals, together with Stravinsky, whom he had tried in vain to persuade to be firmer with the singers. He concluded that Stravinsky "was not a good conductor; he was a terribly lousy conductor", and the singers' problems were compounded because "the orchestra had been ill-prepared by Craft". While agreeing that the singers were "absolutely awful", Boulez protested they had been chosen not by himself, but by an agent in charge of the Aix-en-Provence festival.

Stravinsky himself conducted the first recording in January 1959 with the Columbia Symphony Orchestra. This recording has been reissued several times since, and is part of Sony's 2007 release of Stravinsky's works.

Boosey & Hawkes first published Threni in 1958. Conducting from this score is difficult because of a shortage of bar lines. Asked by Craft about this, Stravinsky said, "The voices are not always in rhythmic unison. Therefore, any bar lines would cut at least one line arbitrarily". He recommended that the conductor "merely count the music out as he counts out a motet by Josquin". But a revised edition, with several changes to the barring as well as some corrections, was issued in 1965.

Stravinsky had already used twelve-tone technique earlier in the 1950s, in Canticum Sacrum (1955) and in Agon (1957). But neither of these is exclusively dodecaphonic, as Threni is.

== Orchestration ==
Threni is scored for one soprano, one contralto, two tenor and two bass soloists, chorus and an orchestra of 2 flutes, 2 oboes, cor anglais, 2 clarinets (second doubling alto clarinet in F), bass clarinet, contrabass sarrusophone, flugelhorn, 4 horns, 3 trombones (1 alto, 1 tenor, 1 bass), tuba, timpani, tamtam, harp, celesta, piano and strings. (The flugelhorn is actually listed as "bugle" by the publisher, though in the "orchestration" list at the head of the score the specification is for "Contralto Bugle in B♭ (Fluegelhorn)", and in the score itself, where all the other instruments are named in Italian, it is called in French and German "Bugle C-alto (Flügelhorn)". However, the part is played on the flugelhorn. The French word for flugelhorn is bugle à pistons, and the Italian is flicorno.)

== General attributes ==
=== Text ===
Stravinsky wrote Threni for the Venice Biennale, not for liturgical use, and he chose the words himself to suit his musical purposes. Kuster's analysis includes the complete text. It includes the Hebrew letters that begin the verses in some chapters of the Lamentations of Jeremiah. These are always set for chorus and have been likened to "a series of illuminated initials embellishing a manuscript".

=== Musical style ===
Stravinsky called his treatment of pitch in Threni "a kind of 'triadic atonality'", contrasting this with his ballet scores' "tonality repetition". Threni makes extensive use of canons. It also uses pitchless chanting in the choir – the first time Stravinsky did this.

The score calls for a large orchestra, but never uses it in tutti, sticking to small groups of instruments at a time.

The principal 12-tone row for Threni is D♯-G♯-G♮-A♯-C♯-A♮-D♮-B♮-E♮-C♮-F♮-F♯. Stravinsky makes considerable use of the tonal – even diatonic – possibilities of this row. But he does not really use twelve-tone technique in depth, relying on free transposition and combination, selection, and repetition, and the music's character is not very different from that of his earlier works: the beginning of "Sensus spei", for example (especially the many repeated notes in the alto solo, and the repeated response from the chorus), recalls Renard and Les noces, and the two short passages for strings and chorus near the beginning setting the Hebrew letters caph and res are reminiscent of places in Orpheus (1948).

=== Influences ===
The work most likely to have influenced Stravinsky's Threni is the Lamentatio Jeremiae prophetae, opus 93, by Ernst Krenek, for 8-part unaccompanied choir, composed in 1942 but only published in 1957 (the year before Threni). Stravinsky said he liked this work, that he had read a treatise by Krenek on twelve-tone counterpoint, and that "Perhaps my own Threni shows contact with [Krenek's] Lamentations." Stravinsky's decision to rely on a tactus beat rather than on bar lines in the "Querimonia" section is one instance.

Edgar Murray finds Threni less expressive than the Krenek, and more like Thomas Tallis's Lamentationes. But Stravinsky, while acknowledging that he had studied Tallis's setting and works by William Byrd and Palestrina, did not believe that they had influenced his piece.

Other resemblances have been observed – for example, the male-quartet episode in the "Querimonia" was probably suggested by Carlo Gesualdo's Aestimus sum – though such things may be better characterized as "identifications" than "influences".

The passage beginning at bars 231 ("NUN: Scrutemur vias nostras") presents a rhythmic texture new to Stravinsky, which strongly resembles the multilayered rhythms of Stockhausen's Zeitmaße, which Craft was rehearsing in Stravinsky's home at the time of composition (16 January to 14 February 1958). Stravinsky attended not only these rehearsals but also the recording sessions for Zeitmaße, following the score with great interest. The published score of Threni is also the first of Stravinsky's works to adopt the device of replacing the staves in silent measures with white space, a feature frequently found in Stravinsky's manuscripts as early as 1916, but only in print from this point onward. This feature is also in Stockhausen's score.

The series in Boulez's Structures Ia is found in the sketches for Threni, but differs so fundamentally from the row Stravinsky actually used that its relevance to Threni is unclear.

== Movements ==
Threni has three movements, corresponding to the three chapters of the Lamentations of Jeremiah from which the texts used in the work are taken. The following is a summary. A detailed musical analysis and the complete Latin text, side by side with the English of the King James version of the Bible, are available in Andrew Kuster's thesis.

=== 1. De Elegia Prima ===
After a short orchestral introduction, the movement begins with the words "Incipit lamentatio Jeremiae Prophetae" ("Here begins the lamentation of the prophet Jeremiah"), after which the music sets Lamentations chapter 1, verses 1, 2 (first part), 5 (first part), 11 (last part) and 20. A Hebrew letter precedes each verse used (aleph, beth, he, caph, resh).

=== 2. De Elegia Tertia ===
This movement uses text from chapter 3 of Lamentations, with a Hebrew letter preceding each block of three verses. It is much longer than the other two movements combined, and is divided into three sections:

Querimonia
(complaint) uses verses 1–6 and 16–21 (Hebrew letters: aleph, beth, vav, zayin).
Sensus spei
(sense of hope) uses verses 22–27, 34–36, 40–45 and 49–57 (Hebrew letters: heth, teth, lamed, nun, samekh, ayin, tsade, qoph).
Solacium
(solace) uses verses 58–64 (Hebrew letters: resh, shin, tav).

=== 3. De Elegia Quinta ===
This is by far the shortest movement. It begins with the words "Oratio Jeremiae Prophetae" ("prayer of the prophet Jeremiah"), after which the music sets Lamentations chapter 5, verses 1, 19 and 21. No Hebrew letters are associated with this text.

== Discography ==
- Stravinsky: Threni, id est Lamentationes Jeremiae Prophetae (1957–58), Igor Stravinsky Conducting. Bethany Beardslee (s); Beatrice Krebs (contralto); William Lewis and James Wainner (tenors); Mac Morgan (baritone); Robert Oliver (bass); The Schola Cantorum (Hugh Ross, dir.); Columbia Symphony Orchestra; Igor Stravinsky conducting (recorded 5–6 January 1959, New York). LP recording, monaural. Columbia Masterworks ML 5383. New York: Columbia Records, 1959. Reissued on Stravinsky: Choral Works. Igor Stravinsky Recorded Legacy 14. 2-LP set. CBS 37527–37528. [N.p.]: CBS, 1981. Reissued on Igor Stravinsky Edition, Vol. 11. 2-CD set. Sony SM2K 46301. [N.p.]: Sony Classical, 1991. Reissued on Disc 21 (88697103112-21), "Sacred Works vol. 2", of Works of Igor Stravinsky. 22-CD set. Sony Classical 88697103112. New York: Sony BMG Music Entertainment, 2007.
- Stravinsky Vol. VI: Symphony of Psalms, Les Noces, Lamentations of Jeremiah. The Philharmonia; The Simon Joly Chorale; Robert Craft, cond. In Les Noces: International Piano Quartet, Tristan Fry Percussion Ensemble, Alison Wells (soprano), Susan Bickley (mezzo-soprano), Martyn Hill (tenor), Alan Ewing (basso profundo); In Threni: Julie Moffat (soprano), Jennifer Lane (mezzo-soprano), Martyn Hill and Joseph Cornwell (tenors), David Wilson-Johnson and Martin Robson (basses). (Symphony of Psalms recorded 5 & 6 January 2001; Les Noces recorded 8 & 9 January 2001; Threni recorded 25–30 June 2001; all recorded at Abbey Road Studio One, London, England.) Koch KIC-CD-7514. New York: Koch International Classics, 2002.
- Stravinsky: Threni, Requiem Canticles. Collegium Vocale Gent; Royal Flemish Philharmonic; Philippe Herreweghe, cond. Christina Landshamer (soprano), Ewa Wolak (alto), Maximilian Schmitt (tenor), Magnus Staveland (tenor), Florian Boesch (bass), David Soar (bass), recorded 13–15 October 2014. PHI–LPH020. Phi Classics, 2016.
