= Max Thurn =

German conductor

- Born: 27 October 1897
- Died: 22 July 1969 (aged 71)
- Occupation: Choral conductor
- Organizations: Hamburg State Opera; NDR Chor

Max Thurn (27 October 1897 – 22 July 1969) was a German conductor who was known particularly for his work as a choral conductor. He was the director of the choir of the Hamburg State Opera and of the NDR Chor, and was a co-founder of the boys' choir of the broadcaster Norddeutscher Rundfunk (NDR).

== Career ==
Thurn was the choral conductor of the Hamburgische Staatsoper from 1946 to 1965. His productions included Mozart's Die Entführung aus dem Serail in 1954, with Teresa Stich-Randall and Rudolf Schock in leading roles.

He founded the choir of the broadcaster Nordwestdeutscher Rundfunk (NWDR, later NDR) on 1 May 1946, after accepting 55 singers from more than 2,000 applications. He conducted the choir in Hamburg while Otto Franze conducted the choir in Cologne, until NDR and WDR split in 1955.

From 1953 he conducted for the NDR a series of Bach cantatas, with members of the NDR Chor, members of the NDR Sinfonieorchester, and renowned soloists such as Margot Guilleaume, Hans-Joachim Rotzsch, Erich Wenk, Lotte Wolf-Matthäus and Ursula Zollenkopf. The repertory of the choir included also operettas such as Die Fledermaus by Johann Strauss. Thurn prepared the NWDR Chor Hamburg for the posthumous premiere of Arnold Schoenberg's unfinished opera Moses und Aron at the Musikhalle Hamburg on 12 March 1954.

Some of his radio productions were later issued on record and CD, such as in 1953 Puccini's Tosca with Rudolf Schock. Thurn prepared in 1953 the choir of the NWDR for Wagner's Lohengrin, with soloists Maud Cunitz, Schock, Margarete Klose, Josef Metternich and Gottlob Frick, conducted by Wilhelm Schüchter. In 1956, Thurn prepared the choir for a performance for the opening of the 77th Deutscher Katholikentag in Cologne from 29 August to 2 September, aired from the Funkhaus in Cologne. The Requiem by Hector Berlioz was performed by Nicolai Gedda, the radio choirs and the Kölner Rundfunk-Sinfonie-Orchester, conducted by Dimitri Mitropoulos. In 1965, he prepared the NDR Chor for a live recording of Isang Yun's Om mani padme hum (1964), with the Rundfunkorchester des NDR Hannover conducted by Francis Travis.

In 1960, Thurn and Horst Sellentin founded the boys' choir of the NDR, later called Hamburger Knabenchor St. Nikolai. In Thurn's last concert with the NDR Chor before his retirement in 1965, he conducted a cappella music from Josquin des Prez to Krzysztof Penderecki's Stabat Mater.

== Selected recordings ==
Recordings of operas for which he prepared the choir are held by the German National Library:

- Wagner: Lohengrin, Cologne Opera
- Kurt Weill: Aufstieg und Fall der Stadt Mahagonny, Frankfurt Opera
- Verdi: La traviata, Hamburg Opera
- Auber: Fra Diavolo
- Puccini Tosca
- Verdi: Die Macht des Schicksals

== Bibliography ==
- Wilhelm Kosch: Deutsches Theater-Lexikon. Biographisches und bibliographisches Handbuch. Klagenfurt: Kleinmayr, 1953–1998.
