= Alexander Malta =

Swiss operatic bass-baritone (1938–2016)

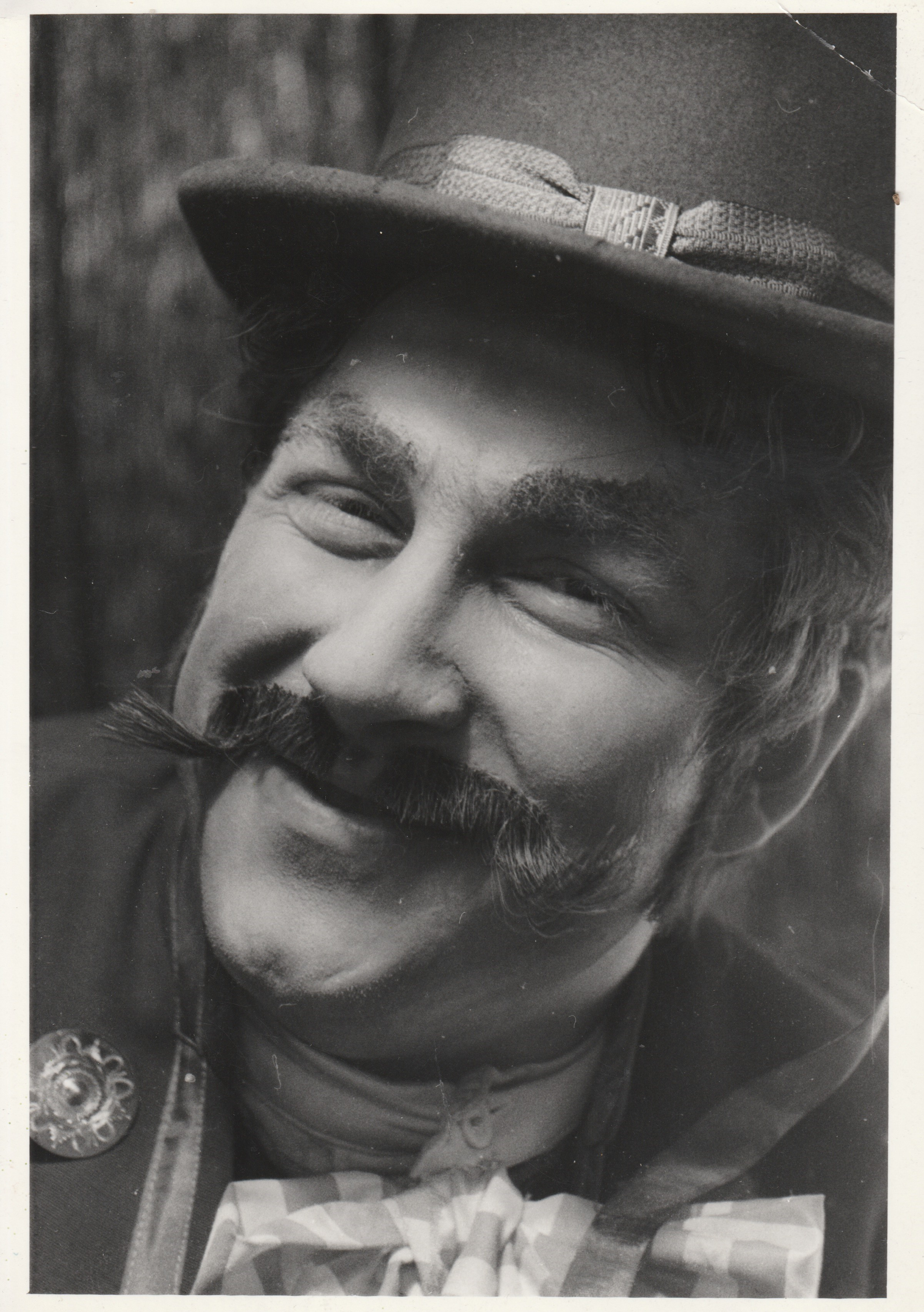
Alexander Malta

Alexander Malta (28 September 1938 as Alexander Lagger – 23 August 2016) was a Swiss operatic bass-baritone.

== Life ==
Born in St. Gallen, after the Matura at the Kantonsschule Trogen, he studied in Zürich and Italy and made his debut in 1966 in Stuttgart as Monk in Don Carlos. Engaged in Munich, he performed in Cologne, Berlin, Vienna, Zürich, Geneva, Milan and Florence, where he sang the role of Landgrave in Tannhäuser in 1983. He made his American debut in San Francisco in 1976, then appeared in Chicago and Philadelphia in 1985.

He was Peter Lagger's younger brother and married the American soprano Janet Perry.
