= Magnificat (Penderecki) =

Religious musical setting by Krzysztof Penderecki

- by Krzysztof Penderecki
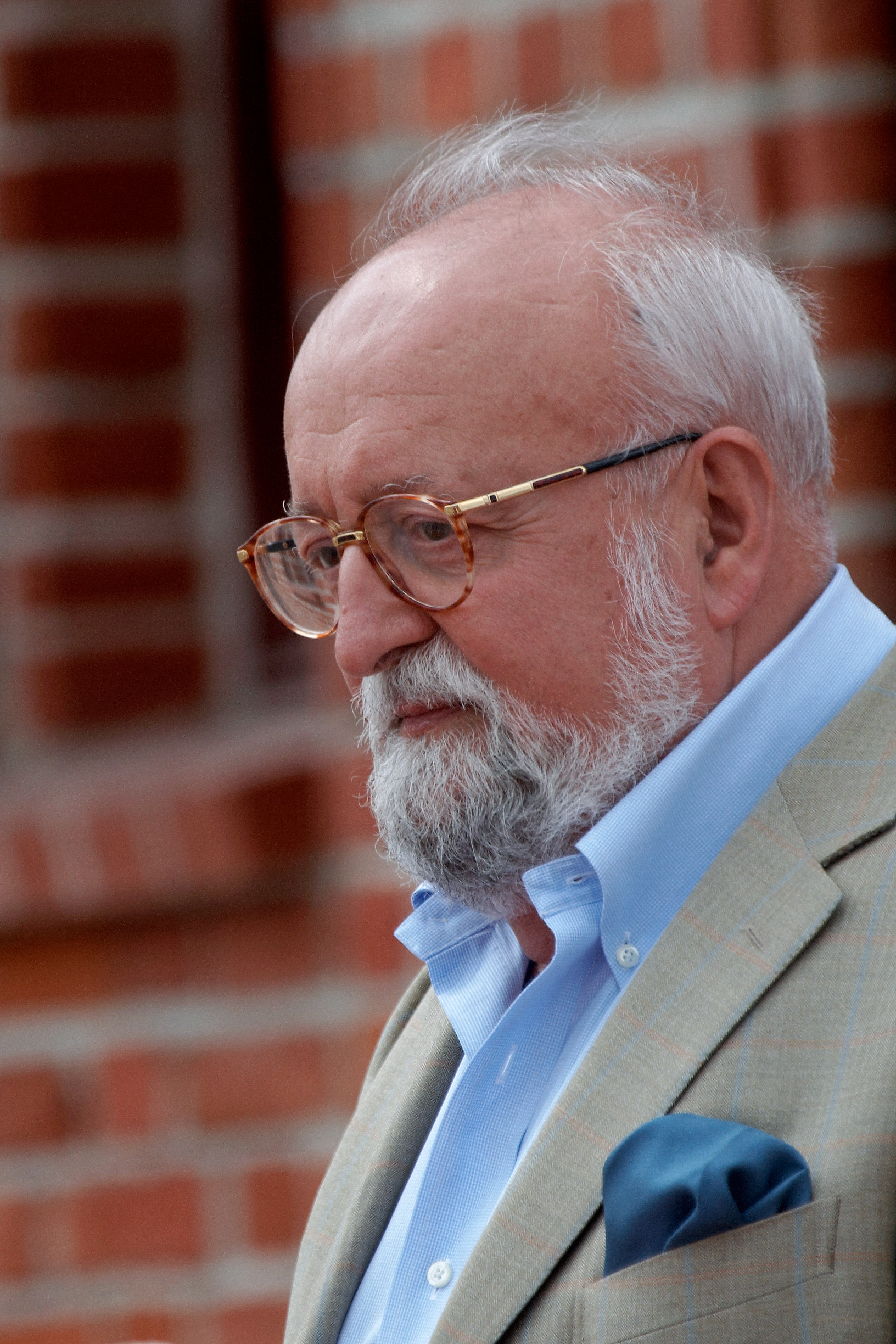
- The composer in 2008
- Occasion: 1200th anniversary of the Salzburg Cathedral
- Text: Magnificat
- Language: Latin
- Composed: 1973–74
- Performed: 17 August 1974
- Scoring: bass; vocal ensemble of seven men's voices; two mixed choirs of 24 voices each; boys' voices; orchestra

Krzysztof Penderecki's setting of the biblical canticle Magnificat was commissioned for the 1,200th anniversary of Salzburg Cathedral and premiered there on 17 August 1974 under the composer's baton. It is a vast work, being scored for bass vocal soloist, boys' voices, seven other men’s voices, two 24-part mixed choirs and orchestra.

Penderecki received the 1977 Prix Arthur Honegger for the work.

== Structure ==
The magnificat is in seven movements:

1. Magnificat anima mea
2. Fuga "Quia respexit humilitatem"
3. Et misericordia eius
4. Fecit potentiam
5. Passacaglia
6. Sicut locutus est
7. Gloria

The duration is given as 40 minutes. The first section begins with a sustained note which grows to a cluster, into which the choir enters the initial text. The second section is a fugue in dense texture, with sub-divided voices and rich harmonies. In the third section, mercy (misericordia) is depicted by high woodwinds and strings with the voices in chordal clusters. The solo bass expresses power (potentia) in the fourth section, first juxtaposed by lower strings, then concluding alone but still with high intensity.

The fifth section is a passacaglia which includes declaimed text sung, spoken and whispered, reminiscent of Penderecki's earlier choral compositions. The sixth section is the most complex, with the voices and several instruments in exchanges, and solo voices corresponding to instrumental motifs. After a climax that "pivots between tonal stability and disintegration", with brass dominating but interjected by strings and timpani, the conclusion arrives in a "mood of anxious and equivocal calm".

== Recording ==
The world premiere recording was by Peter Lagger, the Polish Radio Chorus of Krakow, the Soloists & Boys' Chorus from the Krakow Philharmonic Chorus, and the Polish Radio National Symphony Orchestra, conducted by the composer, released in 1975 on the EMI/Angel label catalog S-37141.

It was later recorded by Warsaw Philharmonic Orchestra, conducted by Antoni Wit, with Wojtek Gierlach as the soloist. In her review in The Guardian, Kate Molleson noted that the composer wrote his early sacred music in defiance of the Communist regime in Poland and observed that Penderecki was in a period of transition from avant-garde composition to reminiscences of late-romantic music and his Magnificat mixes tone clusters and diatonic chords. On the recording, Magnificat is juxtaposed with Penderecki's Kadisz ["Kaddish"], composed in 2009.
