= Horst Sellentin =

German opera singer

- Born: 14 September 1922; Berlin
- Died: 10 May 1973 (aged 50)
- Occupations: Classical baritone; Choral conductor
- Organizations: Theater Lübeck; NDR Chor; Hamburger Knabenchor St. Nikolai

Horst Sellentin (14 September 1922 – 10 May 1973) was a German baritone and a choral conductor.

Born in Berlin, Sellentin studied instrumental music, voice and conducting. He worked at the Theater Lübeck from 1946 to 1948. From 1948 he was a singer of the NDR Chor in Hamburg who also appeared as a soloist. In 1960, he co-founded with Max Thurn the boys' choir of the NDR, called Knabenchor des Norddeutschen Rundfunks in Hamburg and was its director. When the choir became part of the new church St. Nikolai (Hamburg), the name was changed to Hamburger Knabenchor St. Nikolai. Sellentin was its conductor until 1971.

== Selected recordings ==
- Unser Sandmännchen - Auf ins Traumland! Sony BMG Music Entertainment (Germany), Munich 2008
- Tchaikovsky: Eugen Onegin. Line Music, Hamburg 2005
- Verdi: Höhepunkte aus La Traviata. Karussell, Hamburg; Polygram-Musik-Vertrieb, Hamburg [1986]
- Die allerschönsten Kinderlieder. Miller International, Quickborn 1975 and 1979
