= Marlise Wendels =

German operatic soprano (1923–2012)

- Born: 28 April 1923; Saargebiet, Germany
- Died: 23 August 2012 (aged 89); Schwalbach, Germany
- Occupation: Opera singer (soprano)
- Years active: 1952–1988

Marlise Wendels (28 April 1923 – 23 August 2012) was a German operatic soprano closely associated with the Oper Frankfurt.

== Life and career ==
Wendels was born in Saargebiet. She trained in singing in Kaiserlautern and Saarbrücken before joining the chorus of the Saarländisches Staatstheater in 1941. She was accepted as a member of the Frankfurt opera chorus in 1952 and in 1956 became a soloist with the company. According to an article in the Frankfurter Allgemeine Zeitung published on her 80th birthday, Georg Solti (at the time musical director of the Oper Frankfurt) had made her promise that if accepted she would never leave the company.

Wendels kept her promise. She remained with the Oper Frankfurt for 36 years, singing over 100 roles that ranged from soubrette to dramatic soprano. At the height of her career she would sometimes sing in up to 300 performances in a single season. She was particularly noted for her performances as Liu in Puccini's Turandot, Marie in Smetana's The Bartered Bride, Musetta in Puccini's La bohème, Micaela in Bizet's Carmen, and Gretel in Humperdinck's Hänsel und Gretel. She also sang the role of Rosa in the first staged performance of Hans Werner Henze's opera Ein Landarzt in 1965.

During her career Wendels occasionally appeared on German television as a guest on the variety show Zum Blauen Bock and the quiz show Einer wird gewinnen. She was made a Kammersängerin of the Oper Frankfurt in 1983 and retired from the company in 1988. She died in Schwalbach at age 89.

Wendels can be heard on two live recordings from early in her career—as First Lady in a 1955 production of Die Zauberflöte conducted by Georg Solti and as Barena in a 1961 production of Janáček's Jenůfa conducted by Lovro von Matačić.
