= Louise Talma =

American composer

- Born: Louise Juliette Talma; October 31, 1906; Arcachon, France
- Died: August 31, 1996 (aged 89); Yaddo
- Education: Columbia University; Institute of Musical Arts (later Juilliard School); American Conservatory
- Occupations: Pianist; Composer
- Organizations: American Conservatory; Hunter College; MacDowell Colony
- Awards: Guggenheim Fellowship; National Institute of Arts and Letters; Harriet Cohen International Music Award; Joseph H. Bearns Prize

Louise Juliette Talma (October 31, 1906 – August 13, 1996) was an American composer, academic, and pianist. After studies in New York and in France, piano with Isidor Philipp and composition with Nadia Boulanger, she focused on composition from 1935. She taught at the American Conservatory in Fontainebleau, and at Hunter College. Her opera The Alcestiad was the first full-scale opera by an American woman staged in Europe. She was the first woman in the National Institute of Arts and Letters and the first woman awarded the Sibelius Medal for Composition.

== Biography ==
=== 1906-1925: Early life and education ===
Born in Arcachon in France to an American mother, Alma Cecile Garrigues, a professional soprano who took the name Cecile Talma around 1900, and a father whose identity remains unknown. Mother and daughter returned to the United States in 1914, settling in New York City. Talma grew up surrounded by music but was also an excellent science student and considered becoming a chemist before deciding on a career as a musician. After graduating from Wadleigh High School, Talma studied chemistry at Columbia University while simultaneously studying piano and composition at the Institute of Musical Arts (now Juilliard) in New York from 1922 to 1930. She received her Bachelor of Music degree from New York University in 1931 and her Master of Arts degree from Columbia in 1933. She studied piano with Isidor Philipp at the American Conservatory in Fontainebleau, France, every summer from 1926 to 1935. From 1928, she studied annually composition with Nadia Boulanger, deciding in 1935 to focus on composition. She continued to study with Boulanger until 1939. Talma taught at Hunter College of the City University of New York from the late 1920s.

Talma's first pieces show an interest in neo-classical approaches and techniques and appear to be highly autobiographical, establishing compositional patterns that would continue throughout her career. Speaking of her creative life, Talma identified three periods: her early works, which were composed during her “neo-classical period,” 1925–1951; her “serial period,” 1952–1967; and her “non-serial atonal period,” 1967–1996. However, after adopting serial methods in 1952, the majority of her works even in this last period owe something to serial approaches, especially in terms of melody creation.

=== 1925-1951: "Neo-Classical period" ===
==== 1926-1939: Studies with Nadia Boulanger ====
In 1926, after making a successful debut as a concert pianist in New York, Talma spent her first summer at the American Conservatory in Fontainebleau, France, where she met pedagogue Nadia Boulanger. Under Boulanger's guidance, Talma gave up her piano studies in order to focus on composition, converted from agnosticism to Roman Catholicism in 1934 with Boulanger as her godmother, and adopted a lifestyle similar to Boulanger's in its devotion to music. In 1936, Talma became the first American faculty member at the American Conservatory.

==== Early works and awards ====
Talma's Piano Sonata No. 1 (1943), Toccata for Orchestra (1944) and Alleluia in the Form of Toccata for piano (1945) were highly praised by critics and helped establish Talma as an important American composer at the beginning of her career. Based in part on the success of these works, she was the second woman (after Ruth Crawford Seeger in 1930) to receive a Guggenheim Fellowship in music composition and the first woman awarded back-to-back Guggenheims in 1946 and 1947.

Talma was a full-time member of the music faculty at Hunter College in New York from 1928 until 1979, during which time she helped author two harmony textbooks for her students.

==== Residencies at MacDowell ====
In the 1940s, Talma also began spending each summer at the MacDowell Colony in Peterborough, New Hampshire, where most of her mature works were composed. In 1946, she reported on her time spent at MacDowell,

“For two months now I have had the wonderful privilege of dwelling in that enchanted little house, the Phi Beta Studio at the MacDowell Colony in Peterborough, New Hampshire... It is a veritable fairy-tale house, snugly sheltered from the road by a pine grove, and, on the other side, looking out on a clearing edged by great tall sentinel pines.”

During her residencies, Talma was, at times, inspired by bird calls she encountered. Amongst her papers housed at the Library of Congress are Talma's transcriptions of birdsongs, which she used as source materials for her compositions.

=== 1952-1967: "Serial period" ===
In 1952, Talma heard Irving Fine's serial but tonally centered string quartet and immediately began working with serial approaches and techniques in her works. Although she stated that her serial period primarily extended from 1952 to 1967, the majority of her works up until her death engaged with some form of serial practice. Her setting of e e cummings's "Let’s Touch the Sky" was her first completed serial work; her String Quartet (1954), Piano Sonata No. 2 (1955), and La Corona (1955), a setting of John Donne's Holy Sonnets all use clearly audible serial elements. As she developed her own compositional voice using serial elements, Talma created rows that allowed for tonal centering as well as more traditional, stricter use of pitch class sets.

Talma began working on a grand opera with writer Thornton Wilder in 1954 after the two had met while working at the MacDowell Colony. They considered several scenarios before deciding to base the opera on Wilder's existing stage play about the Greek figure Alcestis. Composed while Talma was in residence at the American Academy in Rome and at the MacDowell Colony, The Alcestiad was completed in 1958. Although several American opera houses, including the Lyric Opera in Chicago, the Met, and the San Francisco Opera, expressed interest in the work, all of them deemed it too difficult for American performers and audiences. Wilder had previously enjoyed considerable success in Germany, and Die Alkestiade was premiered by the Oper Frankfurt in 1962. It was the first time full-scale opera by an American woman was performed at a major European theatre. However, perhaps due to the enormous resources the work requires, and despite the fact that it was critically and publicly well-received, it remains relatively unknown. Nonetheless, The Alcestiad secured Talma a place in the ranks of ground-breaking American and female composers; in 1963 she was the first female composer to win the Harriet Cohen International Music Award.

==== Chorus Angelorum, Piccolassima Fughetta, Molto Tonale, Sopra un Téma, Torentoni Niventis Wilderi (1959) ====
Composed while Talma as on hiatus from her work orchestrating The Alcestiad, this humorously named piece was the composer's foray into writing a Christmas carol. She wrote the piece as a musical Christmas card for Wilder, using texts like "Happy New Year" and "Merry Christmas." It is the only known piece Talma completed while completing her opera, and is a motet for three voices a capella in a fugue form. This work is interesting partially because it is tonal instead of serialist or atonal, as was Talma's typical style during this period, and because, according to musicologist Kendra Preston Leonard, because it gives insight into the composer's psyche during this stage of her career.

==== The Tolling Bell: Triptych for Baritone and Orchestra (1969) ====
Although Talma's orchestral work The Tolling Bell technically falls under the years of her "non-serial atonal period," this piece utilizes pitch-class sets and serialism that demonstrates its belonging to her second period. This piece was dedicated to the MacDowell Colony, commissioned by the MacDowell Club of Milwaukee, and premiered by the Milwaukee Symphony in November 1969. Talma was inspired by English literary sources such as Shakespeare, Marlowe, and Donne. She described the work as "freely serial," rather than adhering to any strict serialist format. In 1972, composer and theorist Elaine Barkin wrote about the piece, stating, "Louise Talma appears to be strong and sure and very aware of where she has been and where she is going."

=== 1967-1996: "Non-serial atonal period" ===
Amongst her works during this period was Talma's piece Have You Heard? Do You Know?, a divertimento for three voices and chamber ensemble composed between 1974-1980. It was set to text she herself wrote, featuring the story of Fred and Della, a young couple, and their wish to escape the stresses of modern living. The piece deals with issues of feminism and gender stereotypes, as well as race and class, and the music hearkens back to Talma's earlier Neoclassical tendencies.

She also composed chamber works such as Summer Sounds (1973) for clarinet and string quartet, and orchestral works like Full Circle (1985) during this time of her life.

In 1974, Talma was the first woman elected to the American Academy and Institute of Arts and Letters.

=== Personal Life ===
While it has been theorized that many of her early works express desire for an unattainable beloved (likely Boulanger), she also composed more than 20 religious works after her conversion to Catholicism, setting a number of sacred texts and spiritual writings. Talma's copious correspondence reveals several passionate affairs with women, including one in late life with Ethelston (Eth) Chapman, who had been a fellow student in Fontainebleau with Talma. She never married.

== Legacy ==
Talma's extensive body of works include vocal and choral pieces and works for solo piano, chamber ensembles, and orchestra, as well as a chamber opera, and settings of texts by Auden, Browning, Dickinson, Donne, Hopkins, Keats, Marlowe, Shakespeare, Stevens, Wyatt, and others. Talma dedicated several works to John F. Kennedy after his assassination, including Dialogues for piano and orchestra (1964) and A Time to Remember (1967), an oratorio that sets Kennedy's own words. The Tolling Bell, Talma's setting of texts by Shakespeare, Marlowe, and Donne for baritone and orchestra, was completed in 1969 and nominated for the Pulitzer Prize in music. Talma wrote her own libretto for her 1976 chamber opera, Have You Heard? Do You Know?, a work about the Cold War and the desire for utopias; and continued to compose prolifically into her eighties. She died in Saratoga Springs, New York while working on an elegiac piece, The Lengthening Shadows, while in residence at the Yaddo colony. The bulk of her papers are held at the Library of Congress.

A full-length study of Talma's music by musicologist Kendra Preston Leonard, Louise Talma: A Life in Composition, was published in 2014.

== Awards ==
- Guggenheim Fellowships (1946, 1947)
- Senior Fulbright Fellowship (1955-6)
- Sibelius Medal for Compositions: Harriet Cohen International Awards, London (1963)
- Election to the National Institute of Arts and Letters (1974)

== Selected works list ==
Opera

- The Alcestiad, to a libretto by Thornton Wilder, premiered by the Oper Frankfurt on March 1, 1962 as Die Alkestiade in German
- Have You Heard? Do You Know? for soprano, mezzo-soprano and instrumental ensemble, Chamber opera with music and libretto by Talma (1976)

Orchestra

- Toccata (1944)
- Dialogues for piano and orchestra (1963–1964)
- The Tolling Bell for baritone and orchestra (1967–1969) (after Shakespeare, Marlowe, Donne)
- Full Circle (1985)

Chamber

- Wedding Piece: Where Thou Goest I Go for organ (1946)
- Song and Dance for violin and piano (1951)
- String Quartet (1954)
- Violin Sonata (1962)
- Three Duologues for clarinet and piano (1968)
- Summer Sounds for clarinet and string quartet (1973)
- Lament for cello and piano (1980)
- Studies in Spacing for three winds and piano (1982)
- Ambient Air for flute, violin, cello & piano (1983)
- Fanfare for Hunter College for two trumpets and three trombones (1983)
- Seven Episodes for flute, piano and violin (1987)
- Conversations for flute and piano (1987)
- Spacings for viola and piano (1994)

Piano

- Two Dances (1934)
- Four-handed Fun (1939)
- Piano Sonata No. 1 (1943)
- Italian Suite (1946)
- Venetian Folly: Overture and Barcarolle (1946–47)
- Alleluia in the Form of a Toccata (1947)
- Pastoral Prelude (1949)
- Six Etudes (1954)
- Piano Sonata No. 2 (1955)
- Passacaglia and Fugue (1955)
- Three Bagatelles (1955)
- Soundshots (Composed for pianist Şahan Arzruni, 1974)
- Textures (1977)
- Kaleidoscopic Variations (1984)
- Ave Atque Vale (1989)

Vocal

- Song of the Songless after Meredith (1928)
- Five Sonnets from the Portuguese after E. B. Browning (1934)
- Late Leaves after Landor (1934)
- Never Seek to Tell Thy Love after Blake (1934)
- A Child's Fancy, song cycle after Edith Gould (1935)
- I Fear a Man of Scanty Speech after Dickinson (1938)
- Seven Songs for Voice and Piano
  - One need not be a Chamber to be Haunted after Dickinson (1941)
  - Leap Before You Look after W. H. Auden (1945)
  - Sonnet after G. M. Hopkins (1946)
  - Spring & Fall: To a young child after G. M. Hopkins (1946)
  - Glory to God for Dappled Things after G. M. Hopkins) (1949)
  - Sonnet after G. M. Hopkins (1950)
  - Rain Song (Garrigue) (1973)
- Terre de France, song cycle (1945)
- La Corona, Holy Sonnets of John Donne for voice and piano) (1951–54)
- Birthday Song after Edmund Spencer for tenor, flute and viola (1960)
- Have You Heard? Do You Know? for soprano, mezzo-soprano and instrumental ensemble (1976)
- 13 Ways of Looking at a Blackbird after Wallace Stevens for tenor or soprano and oboe, flute or violin, and piano (1979)
- Diadem after Confucius for tenor and Pierrot ensemble (1980)
- Wishing Well Francisco Tanzes for soprano and flute (1986)
- Infanta Marina, song cycle after Wallace Stevens for soprano (1990)
- The Lengthening Shadows after Donne, Keats, Landor and Hopkins (1993)
