= Wolfgang Rennert =

German conductor (1922–2012)

- Born: 1 April 1922; Cologne, Germany
- Died: 24 March 2012 (aged 89); Berlin, Germany
- Occupation: Conductor
- Organizations: Oper Frankfurt; Staatsoper Berlin; Mannheim National Theatre; Semperoper

Wolfgang Rennert (1 April 1922 – 24 March 2012) was a German conductor. He focused on opera, at the Oper Frankfurt, Staatsoper Berlin, Mannheim National Theatre and the Semperoper, among others. He premiered operas, such as Louise Talma's Die Alkestiade in Frankfurt, and Rainer Kunad's Sabellicus in East Berlin. Regarded as a specialist in Mozart, Wagner and Strauss, he was a guest conductor at international opera houses including the Royal Opera House in London, the San Francisco Opera and the Dallas Opera.

== Career ==
Born in Cologne, Rennert was the youngest son of the district school councillor Alfred Traugott Rennert (born 1879) and Adelheid Rennert, née Nettesheim. The eldest of his brothers, Günther Rennert, became an opera director. Wolfgang Rennert completed his training at the Mozarteum in Salzburg, studying conducting with Clemens Krauss and composition with Johann Nepomuk David. In 1947 he started as a répétiteur at the Opernhaus Düsseldorf. From 1950 to 1953 he was principal conductor and Kapellmeister at the Opernhaus Kiel; until 1967 he was principal conductor and deputy general music director of the Oper Frankfurt. His first production was Millöcker's Der Bettelstudent on 3 February 1954, and he conducted several more operettas. His first opera at the house was Puccini's La bohéme, on 15 May that year, followed by many others from the Italian repertoire. On 6 April, he conducted three stage works by Kurt Weill, Der Protagonist, Der Zar lässt sich photographieren and the ballet chanté Die sieben Todsünden. The operas were staged by Arno Assmann, and the ballet by Tatjana Gsovsky, in a production which was recorded. It was the first of many performances by contemporary composers. On 1 March 1962, he conducted the world premiere of Louise Talma's Die Alkestiade, with a libretto by Thornton Wilder based on his play A Life in the Sea, in a German version with Inge Borkh in the title role. On 24 September 1964, he conducted the world premiere of Gerhard Wimberger's Dame Kobold, a comic opera after Calderón's play The Phantom Lady (La dama duende), staged by Otto Schenk.

From 1967, Rennert was principal conductor of the Staatstheater am Gärtnerplatz in Munich. In the 1968/69 season, Hans Pischner engaged him for the first time as guest conductor at the Staatsoper Berlin in East Berlin, and from 1972 onwards, with an extended contract, as music director there. Until the end of the 1970s, Rennert worked in Berlin with stage directors such as Ruth Berghaus, Erhard Fischer, Harry Kupfer and Luca Ronconi. He conducted new productions of works including Weber's Oberon, Verdi's Falstaff and Othello, Wagner's Der Ring des Nibelungen, Richard Strauss' Salome, and Alban Berg's Wozzeck. He conducted the premiere of Rainer Kunad's Sabellicus after the Faust legend, staged by Harry Kupfer at the Staatsoper Berlin, on 20 December 1974. After the German reunification, he conducted at the Staatsoper Unter den Linden until the mid-1990s.

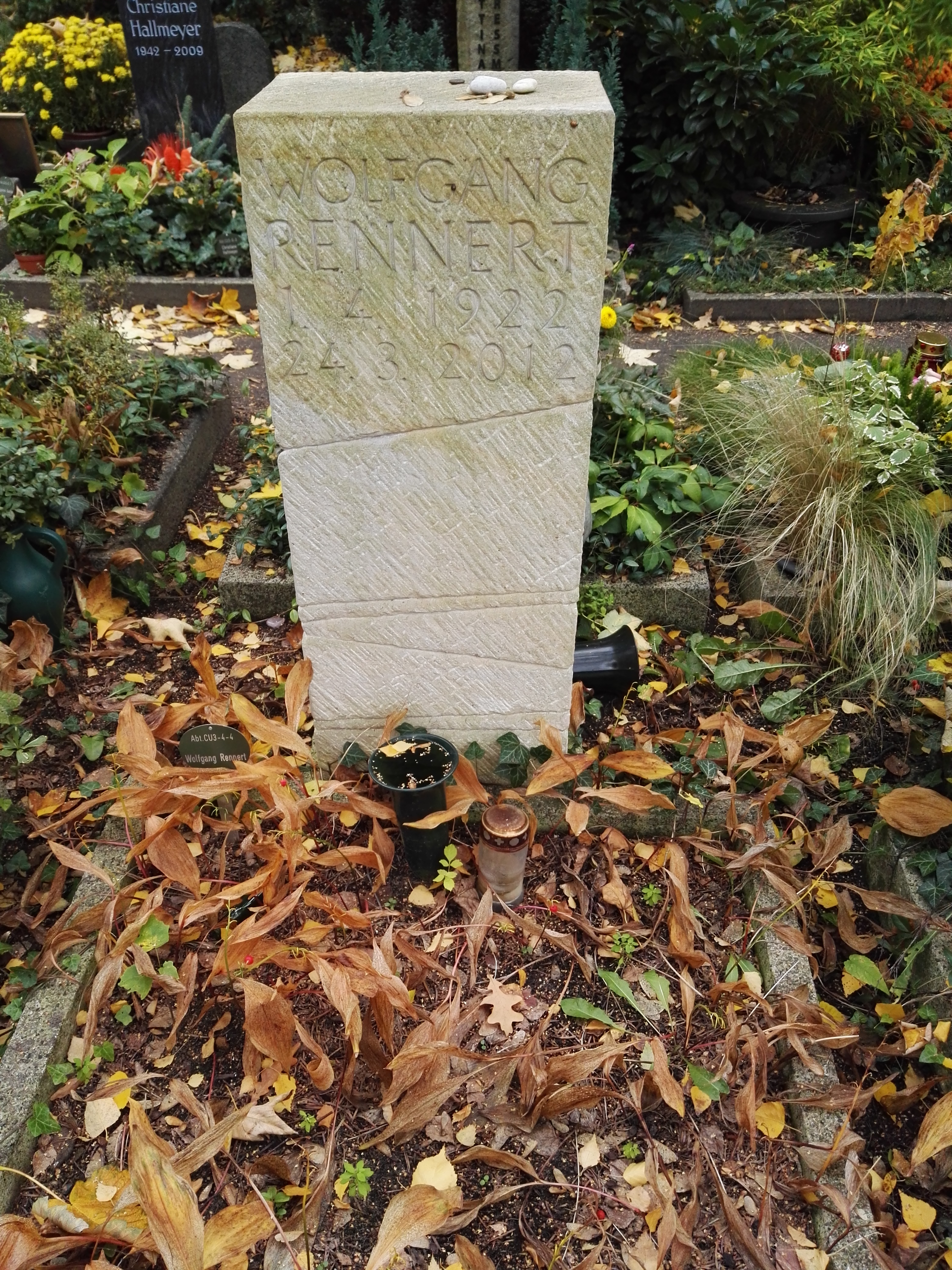
Memorial for Wolfgang Rennert and family

From 1980 to 1985 he was general music director and opera director at the Mannheim National Theatre. He focused there on works by Richard Strauss, such as Elektra, and contemporary operas, including Schoenberg's Moses und Aron. He invited stage directors such as Nikolaus Lehnhoff and Ruth Berghaus to work in Mannheim.

As a specialist in Mozart, Wagner and Strauss, he received engagements from abroad, including the Royal Opera House Covent Garden in London, the San Francisco Opera and the Dallas Opera. In London, he conducted Arabella by Strauss in 1977, with Kiri Te Kanawa in the title role. In the 1970s and 1980s, he conducted extensively in Italy. He was principal guest conductor in Copenhagen starting in 1985 and in Lisbon in the 1990s. In 1991 he began a fruitful musical working phase as a permanent guest conductor of the Semperoper in Dresden, where his last productions were Mozart's Don Giovanni and Die Zauberflöte in 2008.

He died in Berlin and was buried in Dorotheenstadt Cemetery.

== Recordings ==
Rennert recorded Kurt Weill's Die Dreigroschenoper with members of the Oper Frankfurt in 1969.
