= Schloss Fuschl =

Castle in Austria

- Hof bei Salzburg, Land Salzburg, Austria
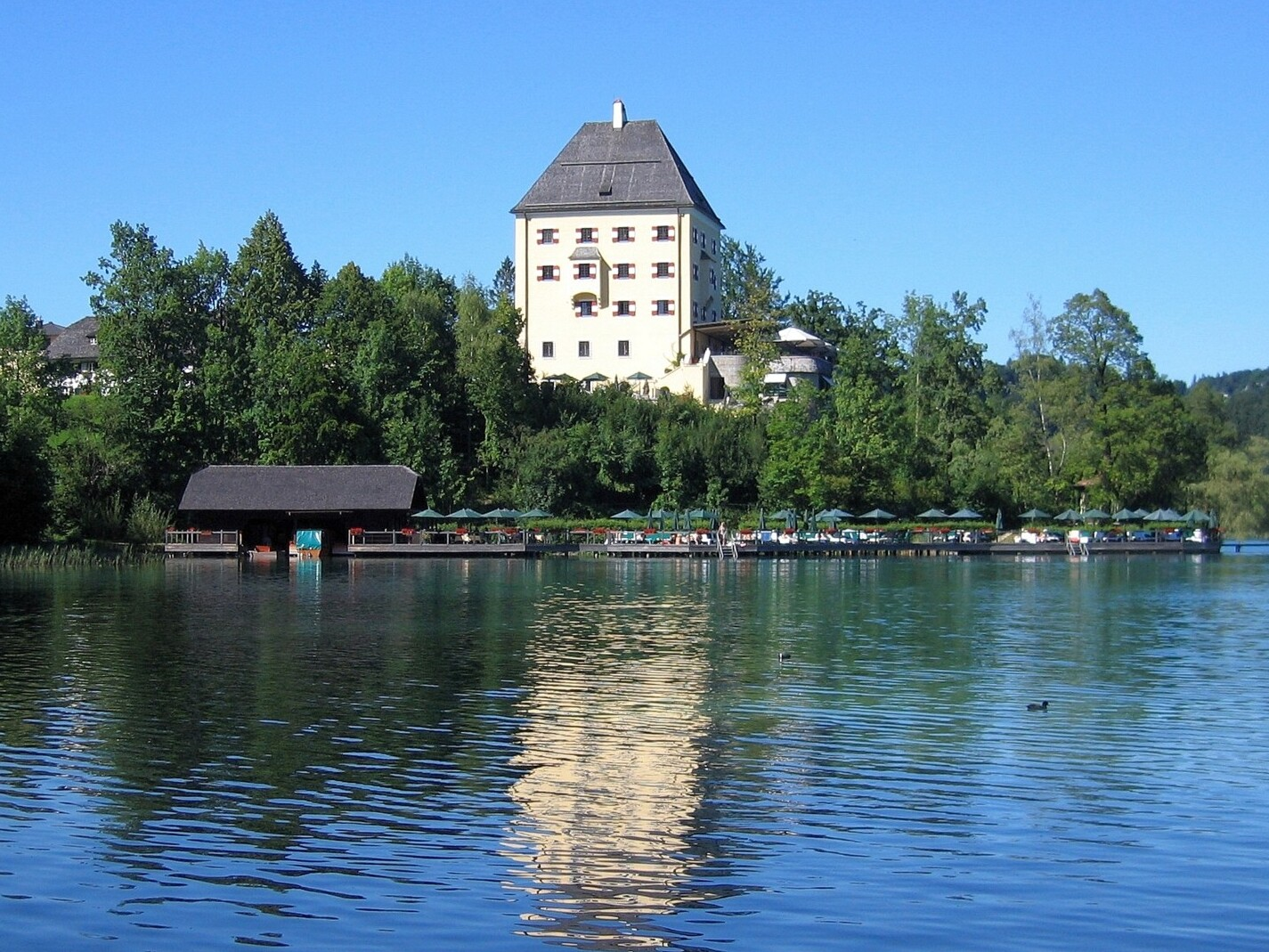
- Seen from the lake

Site information
- Type: castle

Location
- Coordinates: 47.8086°N 13.2560°E

Site history
- Built: about 1450
- Built by: Prince-Archbishops of Salzburg

Schloss Fuschl is a castle in the municipality of Hof bei Salzburg, in the Land Salzburg in western Austria. It stands on a peninsula at the western end of lake Fuschlsee, a glacier lake. It contains a collection of old master paintings, and a museum holding objects relating to the film Sissi, parts of which were filmed in the castle.

== History ==
The castle was built in about 1450 by the Prince-Archbishops of Salzburg, who used it as a hunting lodge. In 1816 the prince-bishopric of Salzburg was dissolved and the property passed to the Austrian state. It fell into disrepair.

By the 1930s it was owned by Gustav Edler von Remiz (1888–1939), who was a supporter of the Fatherland Front and was imprisoned by the Nazis in Dachau, where he died. His property was confiscated, and Schloss Fuschl became the summer residence of Joachim von Ribbentrop, Nazi foreign minister, who used it for diplomatic receptions for Germany's allies. In 1955 the property was restored to the von Remiz family.

It was made into a hotel in the 1950s.
