= Moses und Aron =

Unfinished German opera

- Opera by Arnold Schoenberg
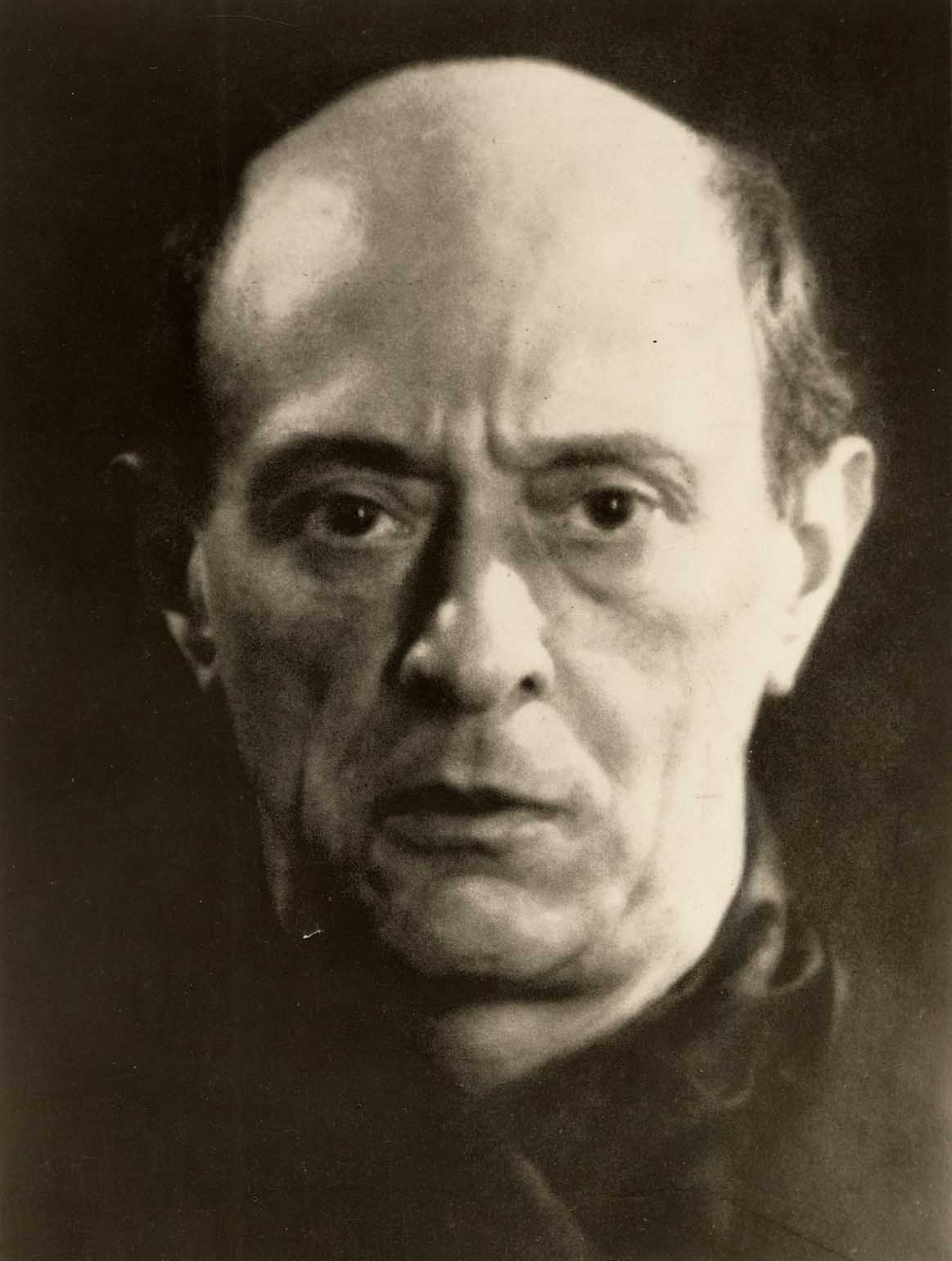
- The composer in 1927
- Translation: Moses and Aaron
- Librettist: Schoenberg
- Language: German
- Based on: Book of Exodus
- Premiere: 6 June 1957 (staging); Zurich Opera House

Moses und Aron (English: Moses and Aaron) is a 1932 opera by Arnold Schoenberg, who wrote his own libretto, in German, based on selected incidents from the Book of Exodus (chapters 3-32). It is effectively in two 50-minute acts, comprising four scenes and five scenes respectively, the last ending with Moses' despair after a confrontation with his brother; critical opinion nearly unanimously finds this to be a satisfactory whole, dramatically and musically, and it is the form in which the work is usually performed. The composer did however at first plan a three-act opera, but he abandoned this idea in 1937 after writing the libretto for a tenth scene, without music. Accordingly the publisher, in 1957, after his death, titled the work an "opera in three acts." In 2009 the Schoenberg heirs permitted Zoltán Kocsis to "complete" Act III by writing music for it; the result was an 18-minute scene, premiered in Budapest the following year.

== Compositional history ==
Moses und Aron has its roots in Schoenberg's earlier agitprop play, Der biblische Weg (The Biblical Way, 1926–27), a response in dramatic form to the growing anti-Jewish movements in the German-speaking world after 1848 and a deeply personal expression of his own "Jewish identity" crisis. The latter began with a face-to-face encounter with anti-Semitic agitation at Mattsee, near Salzburg, during the summer of 1921, when he was forced to leave the resort because he was a Jew, although he had converted to Protestantism in 1898. It was a traumatic experience to which Schoenberg would frequently refer, and of which a first mention appears in a letter addressed to Wassily Kandinsky (April 1923): "I have at last learnt the lesson that has been forced upon me this year, and I shall never forget it. It is that I am not a German, not a European, indeed perhaps scarcely even a human being (at least, the Europeans prefer the worst of their race to me), but that I am a Jew."

Schoenberg's statement echoed that of Gustav Mahler, a convert to Catholicism, some years earlier: "I am thrice homeless: as a Bohemian among Austrians, as an Austrian among the Germans, and as a Jew throughout the entire world. I am an intruder everywhere, welcome nowhere." The Mattsee experience was destined to change the course of Schoenberg's life and to influence his musical creativity, leading him first to write Der biblische Weg, in which the central protagonist Max Aruns (Moses-Aaron) is partially modelled on Theodor Herzl, the founder of modern political Zionism; then to proclaim in Moses und Aron his uncompromising monotheistic creed; and finally, upon his official return to Judaism in 1933, to embark for more than a decade on a relentless mission to save European Jewry from impending doom. Der biblische Weg should be considered as both a personal and political play. Moses, at the center of the biblical Exodus story, had become from the time of Heinrich Heine to that of Herzl and Schoenberg, the ideal incarnation of a national and spiritual redeemer.

From the sketchy outline of the play (1926) to its final version (1927) and to the inception of Moses und Aron as an oratorio (1928), it then became an opera, and the first two acts were composed between 1930 and 1932. Schoenberg often stated his intention to complete the work but composed only a few sketches for Act 3. Despite its unfinished status, it is widely regarded as Schoenberg's masterpiece.

Schoenberg's title may have omitted an "A" in Aaron's name because the composer was severely superstitious about the number 13; "Moses und Aaron" has 13 letters.

Zoltán Kocsis (Hungarian conductor, composer and pianist) had received permission from Schoenberg's heirs in 2009 to complete the last act. His version was premiered in concert at Budapest on 16 January 2010.

== Performance history ==
As Schoenberg always intended to finish the work, the opera was not performed during his lifetime. However, the first public performance of music from the opera was of Der Tanz um das goldene Kalb in concert at Darmstadt on 2 July 1951 conducted by Hermann Scherchen as part of the International Summer Course for Contemporary Music, just 11 days before the composer's death. There was a concert performance of the two acts in Hamburg on 12 March 1954 with Hans Herbert Fiedler as Moses and Helmut Krebs as Aron, conducted by Hans Rosbaud. The first staged performance of the opera was the concluding event of the 1957 Festival of the International Society for Contemporary Music (now called the ISCM World Music Days) which was held in Zurich and took place at the Stadttheater on 6 June 1957, again with Hans Herbert Fiedler as Moses and conducted by Hans Rosbaud, but with Helmut Melchert as Aron.

Georg Solti conducted the first performance at the Royal Opera House, London on 28 June 1965. The singers were Forbes Robinson (Moses) and Richard Lewis (Aron). The American premiere was produced by Sarah Caldwell's Opera Company of Boston on 30 November 1966 with Donald Gramm as Moses, Richard Lewis as Aron, Harry Theyard as the young man, Maxine Makas as the young girl, Eunice Alberts as the invalid woman, and Osbourne McConathy conducting. The New York premiere was presented by the New York City Opera conducted by Christopher Keene, with Richard Cross in the role of Moses and Thomas Young as Aaron, directed by Hans Neugebauer. The Metropolitan Opera did not stage the work until 8 February 1999, under the baton of James Levine with John Tomlinson in his debut there as Moses and Philip Langridge as Aron. The first performance in a communist country was in 1988 at Staatsoper Berlin as staged by Ruth Berghaus and conducted by Friedrich Goldmann.

In 1973, the work was also made into a film by Jean-Marie Straub and Danièle Huillet. A 2006 production by the Vienna State Opera has been published as a DVD.

== Music ==
Moses and Aron is based entirely on a single tone row, itself constructed from cells:

Tone row from Moses und Aron consisting of four trichords, three note cells, followed by the first and last cells

This row is then combined with versions of itself so that the first half of each still provide six different pitches:

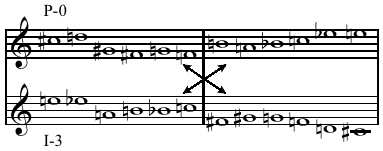
Combinatorial row forms from Moses und Aron pairing complementary hexachords from P-0/I-3

== Roles ==
Role	Voice type	Premiere cast, 12 March 1954 (concert performance) Conductor: Hans Rosbaud
Moses	speaker	Hans Herbert Fiedler
Aron	tenor	Helmut Krebs
Young girl	soprano	Ilona Steingruber-Wildgans
Youth	tenor	Helmut Kretschmar
Ephraimite	baritone	Hermann Rieth
Sick woman	alto	Ursula Zollenkopf
Man	baritone	Horst Günter
Naked youth	tenor	Hartwig Stuckmann
Priest	bass	Hermann Rieth
First naked virgin	soprano	Dorothea Förster-Georgi
Second naked virgin	soprano	Karla Maria Pfeffer-Düring
Third naked virgin	alto	Annemarie Tamm
Fourth naked virgin	alto	Charlotte Betcke
Man	speaker	
Six solo voices in the orchestra	soprano, mezzo-soprano, altos, tenor, baritone, bass	Dorothea Förster-Georgi, Maria Üger, Ursula Zollenkopf, Hartwig Stuckmann, Horst Sellentin, Ernst Max Lühr
Voice from the burning bush, 70 elders, beggars, several elderly persons, 12 tribal leaders, other naked persons, dancers and supernumeraries of all kinds

== Synopsis ==
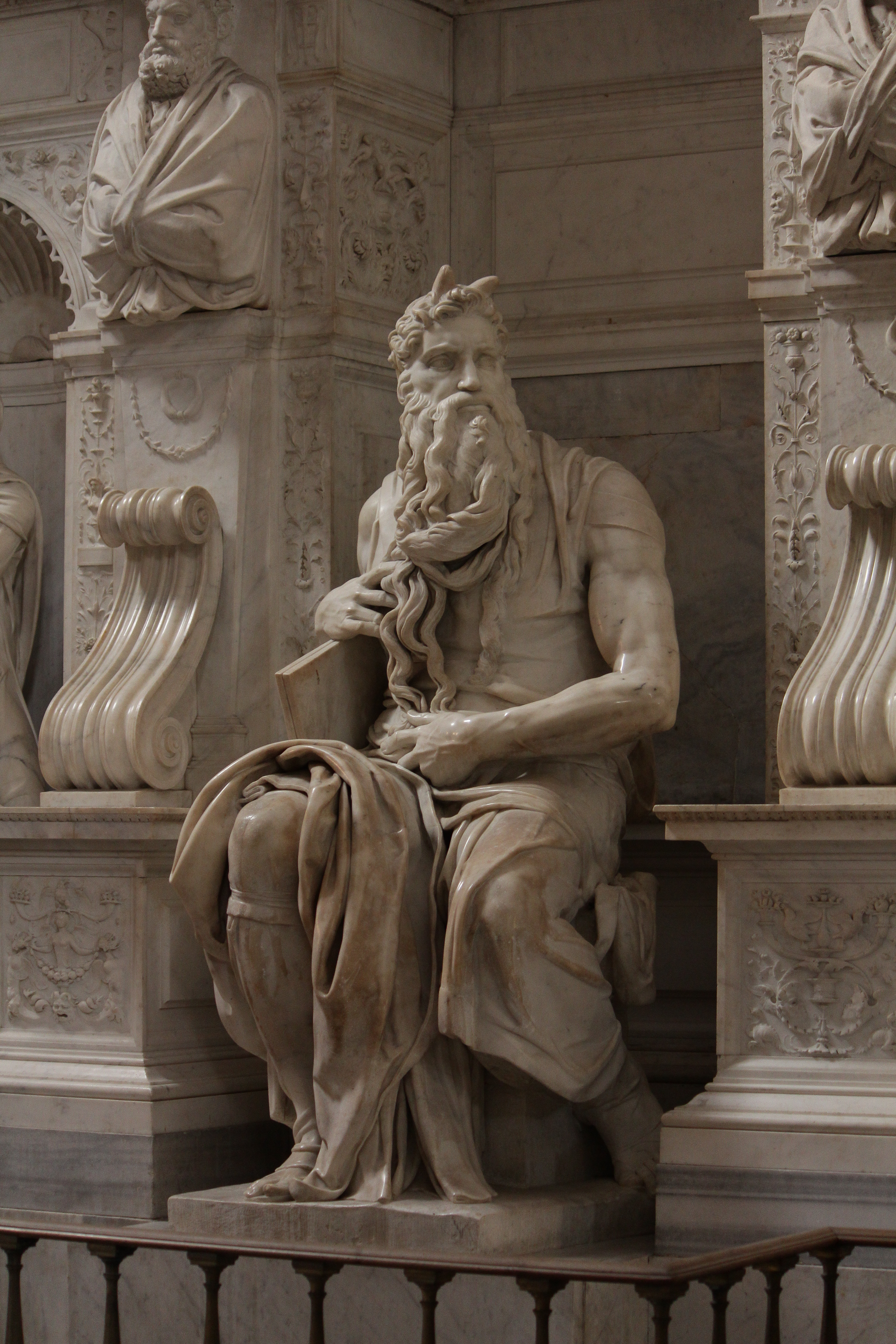
Michelangelo's Moses

Time: Thirteenth century B.C.
Place: Egypt and the desert.

=== Act 1 ===
Moses, in the presence of the burning bush, reluctantly receives from God the order to become a prophet and free Israel from bondage in Egypt. Moses asks to be spared such a task, he is old and though he can think, he cannot speak. God assures him that he will put words in his heart and orders him to find his brother Aron.

In the desert Moses greets Aron, who will have to serve as his spokesman, explaining his difficult ideas in terms the people can understand. Soon they start misunderstanding each other: Moses assures him that love is the key to unlocking this mystery, but Aron praises God for hearing prayers and receiving offerings. Moses cautions that the purification of one's own thinking is the only reward to be expected from tributes.

In the Israelite community there are many who claim to have seen God in different manifestations. A young couple discusses Moses' having been chosen to lead the Israelites. The elders are afraid that because he killed an Egyptian guard, bringing retribution on his people, he will get them into further trouble. One man expresses hope that the new idea of a single God will prove stronger than Egypt's multiple gods, stronger than Pharaoh's grip. The people reiterate this hope, looking at the arriving Moses and Aron, who keep changing roles so that it is difficult to distinguish one from the other. Trying to explain how God can be perceived only within oneself, Moses grows frustrated by Aron's glibness, which seems to weaken his idea. Aron defies Moses, seizing his rod and throwing it down, whereupon it turns into a serpent; this, says Aron, shows how a rigid idea can be made flexible. The people wonder how this new God can help them against Pharaoh's might. Aron shows them another wonder: Moses' hand, which appears leprous, is healed when he places it over his heart, wherein God dwells. The people now believe God will strengthen their own hands: they will throw off their shackles and escape into the wilderness, where Moses says purity of thought will provide the only sustenance they need. Pouring Nile water, which appears to change into blood, Aron interprets the sign, saying they will no longer sweat blood for the Egyptians but will be free. When the water appears clear again, Aron says Pharaoh will drown in it. Promised a land of milk and honey, the people pledge their allegiance to this new God.

=== Act 2 ===
INTERLUDE. Moses has been gone for forty days and the people are left in the desert waiting. Unnerved by his long absence, the people wonder whether God and Moses have abandoned them.

At the foot of the mountain, Aron, a priest and a group of elders wonder why Moses has been gone so long, as licentiousness and disorder prevail among the people. Aron assures them that once Moses has assimilated God's intent, he will present it in a form the people can grasp. To the anxious people who flock to him for advice, however, he admits that Moses may have defected or be in danger. Seeing them unruly and ready to kill their priests, Aron tries to calm them by giving them back their other gods: he will let them have an image they can worship. A golden calf is set up and offerings are brought, including self-sacrifices at the altar. An emaciated youth who protests the false image is killed by tribal leaders. Priests sacrifice four nude virgins, and the people, who have been drinking and dancing, turn wild and orgiastic. When they have worn themselves out, and many have fallen asleep, a lookout sees Moses returning from the mountain. Destroying the golden calf, Moses demands an accounting from Aron, who justifies his indulgence of the people by saying that no word had come from Moses. While Moses' love is entirely for his idea of God, Aron says, the people too need his love and cannot survive without it. In despair Moses smashes the tablets of the laws he has brought down from the mountain. Aron denounces him as fainthearted, saying he himself keeps Moses' idea alive by trying to explain it. Led by a pillar of fire in the darkness, which turns to a pillar of cloud by day, the people come forth, encouraged once more to follow God's sign to the Promised Land. Moses distrusts the pillar as another vain image, but Aron says it guides them truly. As Aron joins the people in their exodus, Moses feels defeated. By putting words and images to what cannot be expressed, Aron has falsified Moses' absolute perception of God, lamenting that he lacks the capability to speak.

=== Act 3 ===
(Schoenberg never composed the music for the final act's single scene.) Aron is put under arrest, accused of fostering idle hopes with his imagery such as that of the Promised Land. Aron insists that Moses' word would mean nothing to the people unless interpreted in terms they can understand. Moses declares that such sophistry will win the people's allegiance to the imagery and not God; by misrepresenting the true nature of God, Aron keeps leading the people back into the wilderness. When Moses tells the soldiers to let Aron go free, Aron falls dead. Even in the wilderness, Moses says, the people will reach their destined goal — unity with God.

== Instrumentation ==
The work is scored for the following large orchestra:

- Woodwind: 3 flutes (2nd and 3rd doubling on 2 piccolos), 3 oboes, English horn, 3 clarinets (3rd doubling on sopranino clarinet), bass clarinet, 3 bassoons (3rd doubling on contrabassoon)
- Brass: 4 horns, 3 trumpets, 3 trombones, bass tuba
- Percussion: timpani, glockenspiel, xylophone, flexatone, 4 bells in A, B♭, F and C', bass drum, 1 pair of crash cymbals, suspended cymbal, triangle, tam-tam, gong, big tenor drum, snare drum, tambourine, ratchet, bells of undefined pitch (usually 3-5: not numbered in the score)
- Other: 2 mandolins, celesta, piano, harp, strings (usually 16 1st violins, 14-16 2nd violins, 12 violas, 10-12 cellos, and 8 double basses: not numbered in the score)
- On-stage: English horn, French horn, 2 trumpets, 2 trombones, 2 mandolins, 2 guitars (T. 929–957), bass drum – more thuds, 1 pair of crash cymbals, 1 set of sleigh bells, gongs in various pitches (usually 12: not numbered in the score), 3 clarinets, 3 French horns or 3 bassoons
- Behind the stage (Off-stage): piccolo, flute, clarinet, trombone, timpani, xylophone, 2–4 mandolins, piano

== Recordings ==
- 1954: Hans Herbert Fiedler, Helmut Krebs, NWDR Chor, Sinfonieorchester des Nordwestdeutschen Rundfunks (Hamburg) conducted by Hans Rosbaud
- 1966: Josef Greindl, Helmut Melchert, Städtische Oper Berlin conducted by Hermann Scherchen
- 1973: Günter Reich, Louis Devos, Chor und Sinfonieorchester des Österreichischen Rundfunks conducted by Michael Gielen (DVD)
- 1975: Günter Reich, Richard Cassilly, BBC Symphony Orchestra conducted by Pierre Boulez
- 1976: Werner Haseleu, Reiner Goldberg, Rundfunk-Sinfonie-Orchester Leipzig conducted by Herbert Kegel
- 1984: Franz Mazura, Philip Langridge, Chicago Symphony Orchestra and Chorus conducted by Georg Solti; Grammy Award for Best Opera Recording in 1986.
- 1996: David Pittman-Jennings, Chris Merritt, Royal Concertgebouw Orchestra conducted by Pierre Boulez
- 1999: John Tomlinson, Philip Langridge, Metropolitan Opera conducted by James Levine
- 2006: Wolfgang Schöne, Chris Merritt, Stuttgart State Orchestra conducted by Roland Kluttig
- 2006: Franz Grundheber, Thomas Moser, Vienna State Opera conducted by Daniele Gatti (DVD)
- 2010: Dale Duesing, Andreas Conrad, Ruhr Triennale conducted by Michael Boder (DVD)
- 2014: Franz Grundheber, Andreas Conrad, EuropaChorAkademie, SWR Sinfonieorchester Baden-Baden und Freiburg conducted by Sylvain Cambreling
- 2015: Thomas Johannes Mayer, John Graham-Hall, Opéra national de Paris conducted by Philippe Jordan (Blu-ray & DVD)
- 2015: Robert Hayward, John Daszak, Komische Oper Berlin conducted by Vladimir Jurowski, director Barrie Kosky (streamed 11 September 2020 to 12 June 2020)
