= Hof bei Salzburg =

- Municipality
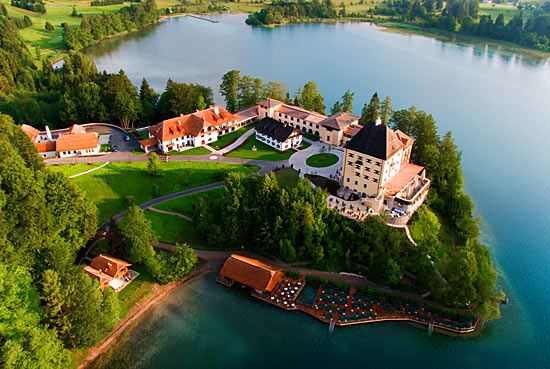
- Fuschl Castle in Hof

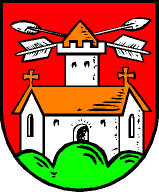
- Coat of arms

- Location within Austria
- Coordinates: 47°49′00″N 13°13′00″E
- Country: Austria
- State: Salzburg
- District: Salzburg-Umgebung

Government
  - Mayor: Thomas Ließ (ÖVP)

Area
  - Total: 19.69 km^{2} (7.60 sq mi)
- Elevation: 739 m (2,425 ft)

Population (2018-01-01)
  - Total: 3,562
  - Density: 180.9/km^{2} (468.5/sq mi)
- Time zone: UTC+1 (CET)
  - Summer (DST): UTC+2 (CEST)
- Postal code: 5322
- Area code: 06229
- Vehicle registration: SL
- Website: www.hof.at

Hof bei Salzburg is a municipality in the district of Salzburg-Umgebung in the state of Salzburg in Austria.

The mezzo-soprano Rosl Zapf (1925–2019) was born in Hof bei Salzburg.

== Geography ==
Hof bei Salzburg is on the shore of the Fuschlsee and is surrounded by the Salzkammergut mountains. The town is on the Austrian motorway A1.
