= Wolofsky =

Wolofsky is a Yiddish surname.

People with this name include:

- Hirsch Wolofsky (1878–1949), Canadian Jewish author
- Saul Jerome Wolofsky (1916–2008), Canadian leader of the Communist Party of Quebec
- Zella Wolofsky (born 1947), Canadian modern dancer and HCI researcher
