= Gustav Classens =

German conductor (1894–1977)

- Born: Gustav Xavier Maria August Classens; 12 October 1894; Aachen, Germany
- Died: 18 June 1977 (aged 82); Bonn, Germany
- Education: Cologne Conservatory
- Occupations: Conductor; Chorale conductor
- Organizations: Beethoven Orchester Bonn; Chor der Bonner Bach-Gemeinschaft

Gustav Classens (12 October 1894 – 18 June 1977) was a German conductor who shaped musical life in Bonn. He was municipal music director and conductor of the Beethoven Orchester Bonn from 1933 to 1949, continuing concerts during World War II and reviving them after the war. He was then for decades conductor of the choir Chor der Bonner Bach-Gemeinschaft that he founded.

== Career ==
Gustav Xavier Maria August Classens was born in Aachen, the son of the photographer August Classens (1849–after 1902) and his wife Maria Classens, née Jessen. He studied music at the Cologne Conservatory from 1913, piano with Otto Klauwell (1851–1917), music theory with Franz Bölsche (1867–1933) and Konrad Ramrath (1880–1972), and score playing with Ewald Strässer (1869–1935). His studies were interrupted by World War I. He served as Gefreiter and was severely injured in 1915. When he returned to his studies in 1919, he took conducting classes with Hermann Abendroth. He graduated in 1923 in piano and conducting.

Classens gave concerts as a pianist and assisted Abendroth with his concerts at the Gürzenich in Cologne. In 1923, he conducted the first concert of the Kölner Kammerorchester (Cologne Chamber Orchestra) which Abendroth had founded. His first leading position was music director of the Kurverwaltung-Konzertgesellschaft in Bad Godesberg from 1924, including conducting the Kurorchesters. In 1925, he also became municipal music director (Städtischer Musikdirektor) in Witten. He had a first contact to Bonn in 1927, when he prepared choirs for the Beethovenfest for the centenary of the composer's death. During the following years, he often stepped in for Generalmusikdirektor (GMD) Max Anton (1877–1939) who had to retire early due to ill health. After three more years, in 1933, Classens was appointed GMD in Bonn. From 1936, he was also responsible for the Bonn Opera, after Heinrich Sauer (1870–1955) had retired in 1931. Classen's intention was to make Bonn a Beethoven city, as Salzburg was a Mozart city.

He had to compromise with the Nazi regime, such as conducting in 1934 the premiere of Deutsches Heldenrequiem, dedicated to Hitler by its composer Gottfried Müller (1914–1993). However, he held a high level of quality, performing in his first season in 1933/34 the oratorio Elisabeth by Joseph Haas, followed by Bach's St John Passion, Beethoven's Ninth Symphony and Choral Fantasy, Hans Pfitzner's Violin Concerto and Ein Heldenleben by Richard Strauss. The following season, he conducted Bach's St Matthew Passion, Handel's Samson, Haydn's Die Jahreszeiten, Beethoven's Missa solemnis and Ninth Symphony, Bruckner's Ninth Symphony, and an evening dedicated to Max Reger with two Bonn premieres. He managed to continue concerts under difficult conditions during World War II and revived the orchestra after the war. He held the position of GMD until 1949.

In 1949, Classens founded a choir which he named Chor der Bonner Bach-Gemeinschaft (Choir of the Bonn Bach Society). which became the Bach-Chor Bonn in 2012. He was director until 1971. In the almost forty years that he led the Bach-Chor, numerous concerts for choir and orchestra took place in Bonn, making it an integral part of Bonn's musical life. They toured in the wider Bonn area as well as to Belgium and Luxembourg. Founded to cultivate Bach's works, the choir's repertoire was soon expanded. In 1951, Haydn's Die Schöpfung was performed. In 1952, Classens conducted the Bonn premiere of Bach's Easter Oratorio, and three years later the first performance there of the Magnificat by Bach's son Carl Philipp Emanuel. The performance of the Bach's St Matthew Passion unabridged in March 1959 became a special event for Bach lovers. Classens conducted Handel's oratorios Judas Maccabäus and Messiah, Haydn's Die Jahreszeiten, and Ein deutsches Requiem by Brahms. He also performed Dvořák's Stabat mater and Requiem, Hermann Suter's Le Laudi which was almost forgotten, and Kodály's Psalmus Hungaricus.

From 1952 to 1966, he was also music teacher at the Otto-Kühne-Schule. Classens died in Bonn at the age of 82.
