= Bach-Chor Bonn =

German choir

- Choir
- Origin: Bonn, Germany
- Founded: 1949
- Founder: Gustav Classens
- Genre: Concert choir
- Chief conductor: Markus Mostert
- Website: www.bach-chor-bonn.de

The Bach-Chor Bonn (Bonn Bach choir) is a large concert choir and oratorio choir in Bonn, North Rhine-Westphalia, Germany. It was founded by Gustav Classens in 1949 as Bonner Bach-Gemeinschaft (Bonn Bach society), and has its present name officially since 2012. It has performed internationally, and recorded. Originally founded specifically to perform the works of its namesake Johann Sebastian Bach, the repertoire now contains major compositions of all periods including contemporary works. The choir has a long tradition of tours to European countries.

== History ==
In 1949, Gustav Classens, the municipal music director of Bonn and conductor of the orchestra (now Beethoven Orchester Bonn, founded the Bonner Bach-Gemeinschaft specifically for the performance of works by Johann Sebastian Bach. Bonn was then the provisional capital of Germany, and Bach's 200th anniversary of death in 1950 was prepared. The society was first formed by both choir and orchestra, with the first concerts including Bach's Musical Offering and Christmas Oratorio. In 1950, they performed Bach's St John Passion. The repertoire was gradually extended to works of other composers. In the beginning, the orchestra played most concerts. From 1971, only the choir formed the society, named Chor der Bonner Bach-Gemeinschaft. On tours, it was labelled Bach-Chor Bonn, which became the official name in 2012.

Classens was succeeded by Roland Bader in 1972 and Herbert Ermert in 1976, who undertook tours to Belgium, Luxembourg, Italy and 14 times to France. Franz Xaver Gardeweg was conductor from 1991 until his death in 2006. He toured with the choir to Italy several times. In September 1999 they performed Bach's Mass in B minor at the Barockfestival Viterbo. In April 2000 they sang Bach's St Matthew Passion as part of the project "La Bibbia nella Musica" (The Bible in Music) in Lombardy. In September 1995, the choir joined the Chor der Staatsphilharmonie Kraków Ein deutsches Requiem by Johannes Brahms in a memorial concert 50 years after the liberation of Auschwitz concentration camp. A tour in summer 2006 of a cappella music had concerts in Mecklenburg-Vorpommern and Poland, with concerts in Kamień Pomorski and Stargard. Gardeweg was succeeded by Jürgen Böhme, in 2010 followed by Horst Meinardus.

Markus Mostert has directed the choir since 2017. The choir has around 80 members. Its programs focus on concerts with orchestra, often in the Beethovenhalle and as guests in other cities and countries.

== Repertoire ==
The Bach-Chor Bonn has performed more than 130 works, especially more than 40 works by Bach including the St Matthew Passion, the Mass in B minor, the Christmas Oratorio, the St John Passion and the Magnificat. Works by Handel include oratorio's such as Judas Maccabaeus and Messiah.

Haydn's works include the oratorio's Die Jahreszeiten and Die Schöpfung, and masses such as Schöpfungsmesse and Harmoniemesse. The choir has performed Beethoven's Missa solemnis, Schubert's masses No. 5 in A♭ major and No. 6 in E♭ major. Major works from the Romantic period have been Schumann's Requiem in D♭ major, Ein deutsches Requiem by Johannes Brahms, Rossini's Stabat mater, Fauré's Requiem, Dvořák's Mass in D major and Verdi's Requiem. Works from the 20th century have included Schönberg's Gurre-Lieder and Britten's War Requiem.

== Choral conductors ==
The choir was directed by:

- 1949–1971: Gustav Classens
- 1972–1975: Roland Bader
- 1976–1990: Herbert Ermert
- 1991–2006: Franz Xaver Gardeweg
- 2007–2009: Jürgen Böhme
- 2010–2016: Horst Meinardus
- from 2017: Markus Mostert

== Recordings ==
- Bruckner: Requiem. Siegerland-Orchester, cond. Herbert Ermert; Aulos-Schallplatten-Produktion, Viersen; Vertrieb: Fono-Schallplattengesellschaft, Münster, 1981.
- Johann Simon Mayr: Samuele. First recording. Orchestra Accademia di Stato di Minsk, cond. Pierangelo Pelucchi; Fono-Schallplattengesellschaft, Laer (1997).
- Cherubini: Requiem / Bruckner: Requiem, cond. Herbert Ermert; Musikado Köln (2004).
