= Hermann Rieth =

German opera singer

Hermann Rieth was a German operatic bass.

== Biography ==
Rieth studied singing at the Musikhochschule von Stuttgart from 1930 to 1936 and then pursued further studies with Alfredo Cairati in Zürich. He made his professional opera debut in 1938 at the Stadttheater von Hagen in Westfalen in the role of Landgraf in Richard Wagner's Tannhäuser. He sang at that theatre through the Spring of 1940, after which he joined the roster at Theater von Teplitz. From 1941 to 1946, he sang roles at the Stadttheater von Bremen and from 1949 to 1974 he sang regularly at the Stadttheater von Freiburg.

Between 1950 and 1955, Rieth participated in numerous radio broadcasts of live concerts in Northwest Germany. He notably sang the role of the Ephraimite in the world premiere of Arnold Schoenberg's Moses und Aron on 12 March 1954. He also sang in the premiere of Darius Milhaud's opera David. In addition, Rieth was an active performer within the concert repertoire.

== Opera repertoire ==
Among the many leading bass roles that Rieth portrayed on stage are Sarastro in Mozart's The Magic Flute, King Mark in Wagner's Tristan und Isolde, and King Philip II in Verdi's Don Carlo. He also sang numerous opera buffa roles.

== Recordings ==
1. Moses und Aron; Danza del vitello d'oro (La nuova musica vol. 5, 1990)
