= Hans Herbert Fiedler =

German opera singer

Hans Herbert Fiedler (November 10, 1907 in Triest – February 14, 2004 in Munich) was a German operatic bass and actor. He is best known today for playing Moses in the original 1954 production of Arnold Schoenberg's Moses und Aron.

== Biography ==
Fiedler studied Germanistics (German Studies) and acting at the University of Graz. He joined the Theater von Troppau in Opava in 1930 where he appeared in stage plays for one season. He joined the Stadttheater von Würzburg in 1931 where he appeared in roles until 1935 when he joined the Volkstheater München. From 1937 through 1940, he worked as a radio broadcaster for the Sender München. During this he became interested in opera and began studying singing in Munich and later with Moratti in Salzburg.

Fiedler made his professional opera debut in 1940 at the Landestheater in Salzburg playing Papageno in Mozart's The Magic Flute. He sang two seasons with that opera house before joining the Theater von Aussig for the 1942-1943 season. He next joined the roster at the Stadttheater von Bremen where he sang roles from 1943-1953. After a commitment at the Stadttheater Mainz (1953–55), his career became more centered within the concert repertoire than in opera, although he still occasionally appeared in stage works. He notably sang the bass solos in Germany's first performance of Bartók's Cantata Profana in Cologne in 1954.

Fiedler periodically performed as a guest artist with several opera houses and opera festivals. In 1947 he sang in a few productions at the opera house in Düsseldorf. In 1951, he sang in the world premiere of Hans Werner Henze's radio opera Ein Landarzt. On 12 March 1954, he sang the role of Moses in the world premiere of Arnold Schoenberg's Moses und Aron. This original production was performed in a concert version, but Fiedler reprised the role for the opera's first staged performance at the Zurich Opera House on 6 June 1957. In 1955, he played the Cardinal of Lorraine in Hans Pfitzner's Palestrina at the Salzburg Festival.

Fiedler retired from his singing career in 1965 after which he joined the voice faculty at the Richard Strauss Conservatory in Munich.

== Opera repertoire ==
Fiedler sang a wide repertoire that encompassed German, Italian, French, Czech, and Russian opera. Some of the stage roles for which he achieved considerable success are Count Almaviva in Wolfgang Amadeus Mozart's Le nozze di Figaro, the title role in Pyotr Tchaikovsky Eugene Onegin, Rodrigo in Giuseppe Verdi's Don Carlos, Iago in Verdi's Otello, Scarpia in Giacomo Puccini's Tosca, Sixtus Beckmesser in Richard Wagner's Die Meistersinger von Nürnberg, the title role in the Boris Godunov and the Jochanaan in Richard Strauss's Salome.
