= Horst Günter =

German opera singer (1913–2013)

Horst Günter (23 May 1913 – 7 January 2013) was a German operatic baritone and voice teacher.

== Life ==
=== Career as an opera singer ===
Born in Leipzig, Günter joined the Leipziger Thomanerchor at the age of 9 and sang there as boy soprano. His first singing teacher was the then Thomaskantor Karl Straube. He referred him to the music professor Fritz Polster in Leipzig. Günter received his vocal training at the Leipzig Conservatory, where he graduated in 1938. He completed further vocal studies in Innsbruck, Bologna and finally in Berlin with the well-known contralto Emmi Leisner. Günter also studied musicology for four years.

Günter was initially active as a concert singer. In 1937 he made his debut in Eisenach as vox Christi in Bach's St Matthew Passion. In 1938 he sang in the Leipzig Thomaskirche in the same role. In 1938 he appeared with the Philharmonischer Chor Berlin in Paris in Bach's Christmas Oratorio. In 1939/1940 Günter was briefly drafted for military service in the Wehrmacht. Concert engagements in Florence (1940), Romania (1940) and Venice followed. (1942).

In 1941 he made his debut as an opera singer at the Mecklenburg State Theatre; his debut role was Count Almaviva in Mozart's opera The Marriage of Figaro. From 1941 to 1944 he was a permanent member of the ensemble at the Staatstheater Schwerin. There he sang among other roles Guglielmo in Così fan tutte, Figaro in The Barber of Seville, Count Luna in Il trovatore, the title role in Rigoletto and Wolfram von Eschenbach in Tannhäuser.

In 1944 Günter was drafted again into the Wehrmacht; until 1948 he was in Soviet captivity after the war where he learned Russian and appeared at concerts. After the war he resumed his stage career at the Deutsches Theater Göttingen (1949/1950 season). He had another engagement at the Hessisches Staatstheater Wiesbaden (1950). From 1950 to 1961 Günter was a permanent member of the ensemble at the Hamburgische Staatsoper; he appeared there as a guest until 1968. In 1954 he took part in the concert premiere of the opera Moses and Aron at the Nordwestdeutscher Rundfunk. He also had guest contracts with the Bayerische Staatsoper (1958–1963) and the Stuttgart State Opera (1959–1965).

Günter made a guest appearance at the Berlin State Opera (1944), at the Komische Oper Berlin(1951), at the Oper Frankfurt (1952), at the Vienna State Opera (April 1953; as Figaro in The Barber of Seville and as Papageno in The Magic Flute) and at the Edinburgh Festival (1952 as Papageno; 1956). From 1951 to 1958 he appeared regularly as a concert singer at the Bachwoche Ansbach.

=== Work as a vocal pedagogue ===
Besides his activity as an opera singer Günter was active as a singing teacher, singing pedagogue and voice educator. He held several teaching positions at universities in Germany and abroad. From 1959 to 1965 he was professor at the Hochschule für Musik Detmold. From 1965 to 1978 he held a professorship at the Hochschule für Musik Freiburg. From 1978 to 1980 he taught at the University of Southern California in Los Angeles. He taught at various universities in the United States, Tokyo, France, Great Britain, Sweden, and Finland. He also regularly gave master classes. Among his students was the American baritone Thomas Hampson.

Günter was co-founder of the European Voice Teachers Association. Günter continued his activity as a singing teacher into old age. Still in 2004 he taught at the International Opera Studio of the Zurich Opera House.

Günter died in Hamburg at age 99.

== Repertoire ==
Günter mainly sang the role of the lyrical baritone on stage, whereby he also took over parts from the field of baritone and the cavalier baritone. Among his most important stage roles were Papageno in The Magic Flute (which he sang almost 350 times), Guglielmo, Figaro, Tsar Peter I in Zar und Zimmermann, Giorgio Germont in La traviata and Marcel in La bohème. Günter rarely sang dramatic roles, recognizing the natural limits of his voice. To his few more dramatic roles belonged only Mandryka in Strauss' opera Arabella.
