= Hans Neugebauer =

German opera director, designer, and singer

- Born: 17 November 1916; Karlsruhe, Germany
- Died: 30 July 1994 (aged 77); Cologne, Germany
- Occupations: Opera director; Scenic designer; Operatic bass

Hans Edgar Neugebauer (17 November 1916 in Karlsruhe – 30 July 1994 in Cologne) was a German opera director, set designer, and operatic bass.

Neugebauer was the son of opera singer Helmuth Neugebauer. After graduating from high school, he studied music, voice and stage design.

Neugebauer also directed the world premiere of Zimmermann's opera Die Soldaten in Cologne in 1965.
