= NDR Vokalensemble =

German choir

- Choir
- Origin: Hamburg, Germany
- Founded: 1946
- Genre: Professional mixed choir
- Chief conductor: Klaas Stok
- Awards: Johannes Brahms Medal
- Website: www.ndr.de/orchester_chor/vokalensemble

NDR Chor Logo 2018

The NDR Vokalensemble (transl. North German Radio Choir) is the choir of the German broadcaster Norddeutscher Rundfunk (NDR), based in Hamburg. It was founded in 1946, with Max Thurn as the first director of then 55 singers. The group has participated in premieres of contemporary music, such as the posthumous concert premiere of Schoenberg's opera Moses und Aron. It is also known for a capella music, introduced by Helmut Franz such as a recording of all such works by Johannes Brahms. The current artistic director is Klaas Stok, who has held the position since 2019. NDR Chor, now a group of 28 singers, is one of the leading professional chamber choirs in Germany. In 2021, the NDR Choir was renamed to NDR Vokalensemble.

== History ==
The NDR Chor was founded in Hamburg on 1 May 1946, then as choir of the Nordwestdeutscher Rundfunk (NWDR) and took its present name in 1956 when the broadcaster was split in NDR and WDR. Its first director was Max Thurn who accepted 55 singers from more than 2,000 applications by professional singers. During the first years it was focused on broadcasts in collaboration with the symphony orchestra, NDR Sinfonieorchester (now NDR Elbphilharmonie Orchester), in programs that were usually also performed in concerts. In 1948, the choir participated in a recording of Beethoven's Fidelio conducted by Hans Schmidt-Isserstedt. From 1953 Thurn conducted a series of Bach cantatas with choir members and members of the NDR Sinfonieorchester. The choir took part in pioneering projects, such as the concert premiere of Arnold Schoenberg's opera Moses und Aron. Ferenc Fricsay conducted in 1959 Rossini's Stabat Mater. Thurn was director until his retirement in 1965.

Contemporary music was more frequently performed when Helmut Franz became director. He conducted in 1967 the premiere of Ligetis Lux aeterna for a cappella choir in a series das neue werk (the new work). Premieres included Pendereckis Utrenja, Henze's oratorio Floß der Medusa which caused a scandal, and Stockhausen's Atmen gibt das Leben. Franz chose Bach's Mass in B minor for his final concert with the choir in 1978.

A more recent focus is a cappella music of all periods. The choir recorded all a cappella work by Johannes Brahms, conducted by Hamburg's Kirchenmusikdirektor Günter Jena, who studied the program from 1981 in around half a year of daily rehearsals. The recording gained the French award Orphée d’Or and became a trademark of the NDR Chor.

In the 1990s, the choir was directed by a Doppelspitze (double lead) of Robin Gritton and Michael Gläser. Leon Schidlowsky composed his Laudate for the choir in 1996. From 1999 to 2004, Hans-Christoph Rademann became choir director. He achieved more transparency in the sound, following historically informed performance of Baroque music, but conducting works by Reger and Bruckner with the same intention.

From the 2008/09 season, Philipp Ahmann has been artistic director of the ensemble. He found an ensemble of only 28 singers and programmed chamber music to match the size. He created a new series four concerts per year focused on a theme. The choir collaborates with the other musical groups of the NDR, but also with other German radio choirs. It has promoted to make music more accessible, presenting a program Konzert statt Schule (concert instead of school), performing concerts for families, conducting workshops open for students of music academies of the region (Musikhochschule), and regular concerts at locations of the region served by the NDR.

In April 2010, the NDR Chor was awarded the Johannes Brahms Medal of the city of Hamburg, given for special merits for musical life in Hamburg and preservation of the cultural heritage of Brahms ("für besondere Verdienste um das Hamburgische Musikleben und die Pflege des Kulturerbes von Johannes Brahms"). Ahmann conducted a festive program on 19 April 2010, of Bach's motets Singet dem Herrn ein neues Lied, BWV 225, and Der Geist hilft unsrer Schwachheit auf, BWV 226, Fest- und Gedenksprüche and Warum ist das Licht gegeben by Johannes Brahms, Knut Nystedt's Immortal Bach and Arvo Pärt's Sieben Magnificat-Antiphonen.

The conductor and composer Eric Whitacre organized in 2012 a sing-along project, SINGING!, in Hamburg, which has become an annual institution, connecting hundreds of singers with the NDR Chor.

The 70th season in 2016/17, also the first season in the concert hall Elbphilharmonie, is marked by extra concerts, including Morton Feldman's Rothko Chapel, Haydn's Die Schöpfung and Handel's Israel in Egypt. In the opening concert of the new concert hall on 11 January 2017, the NDR Chor performed in Beethoven's Ninth Symphony, conducted by Thomas Hengelbrock.

== Choral directors ==
In more than 70 years, the choir had the following directors:

- 1946–65: Max Thurn
- 1966–78: Helmut Franz
- 1995–99: Robin Gritton and Michael Gläser
- 1999–2004: Hans-Christoph Rademann
- 2008–2019: Philipp Ahmann
- from 2019: Klaas Stok

== Recording ==
- Johann Strauss Jr.: Der Zigeunerbaron (Operetta in three acts; version 1886). Nikolai Schukoff, Jochen Schmeckenbecher, Markus Brück, Jasmina Sakr, Claudia Barainsky, Heinz Zednik, Paul Kaufmann, Khatuna Mikaberidze, Renate Pitscheider, Lawrence Foster, NDR Radiophilharmonie, NDR Chor. PENTATONE PTC 5186482 (2016). OCLC 1576695217
- Mendelssohn: Lobgesang, Andrew Manze, Anna Lucia Richter, Esther Dierkes, Robin Tritschler, NDR Radiophilharmonie, WDR Rundfunkchor Köln, NDR Chor. Pentatone PTC 5186639 (2018). OCLC 1579965642
