= Andreas Rieth Homestead =

Historic house in Pennsylvania, United States

- U.S. National Register of Historic Places
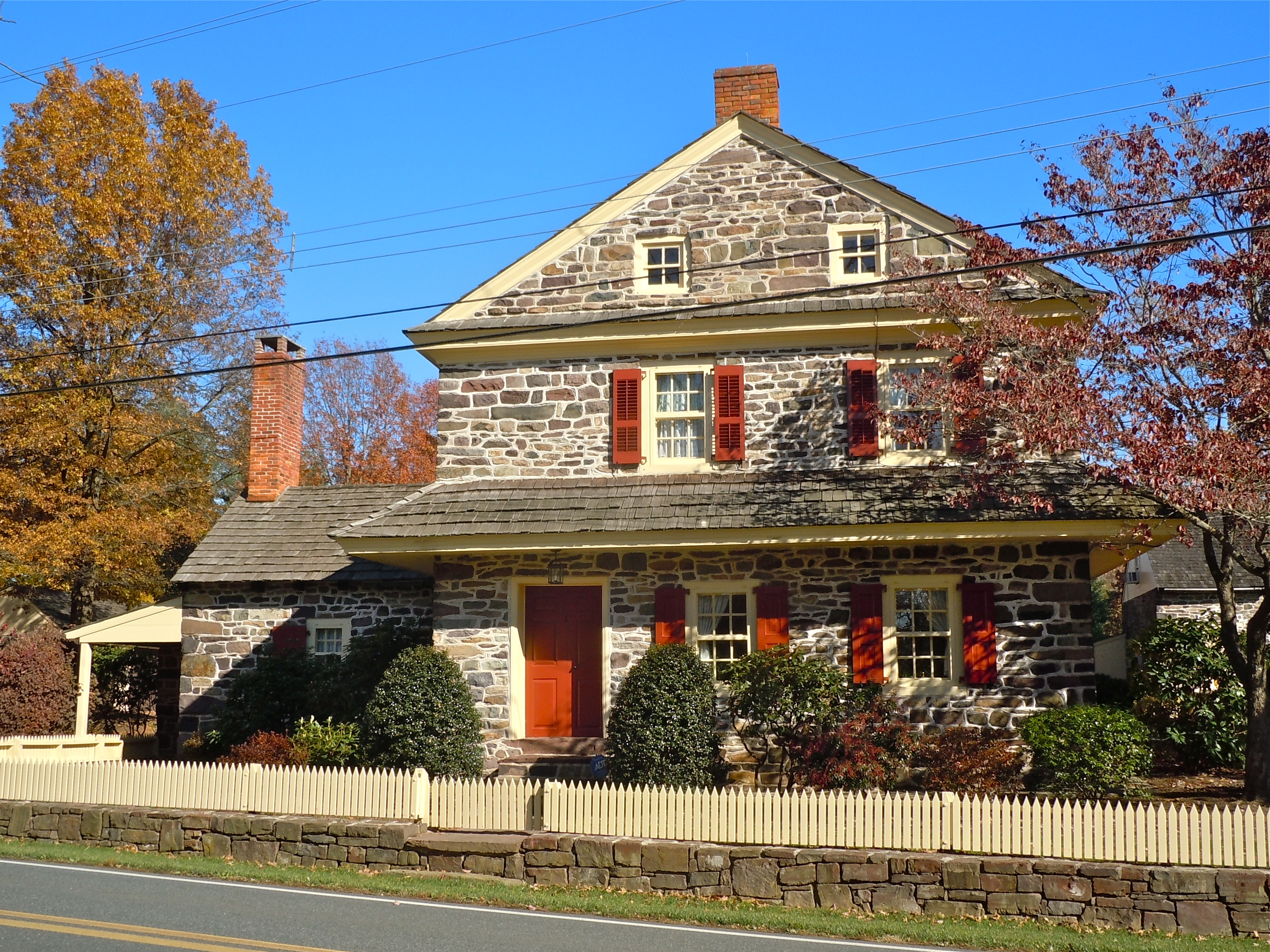
- Andreas Reith Farmhouse, November 2011

- Location within Pennsylvania Location within the United States
- Location: Southeast of Pennsburg on Geryville Pike, Marlborough Township, Pennsylvania
- Coordinates: 40°22′11″N 75°27′33″W
- Area: 5 acres (2.0 ha)
- Architectural style: Georgian, Germanic style
- NRHP reference No.: 73001648
- Added to NRHP: September 19, 1973

Andreas Rieth Homestead is a historic home located near Pennsburg at Marlborough Township, Montgomery County, Pennsylvania. The property has two contributing buildings. The Rieth Farmhouse is a 2 1/2-story, stone dwelling originally built in the Germanic style, but later modified to a Georgian plan. It has a rear kitchen addition. Also on the property is a former 1/2-story, stone bank house later converted to a bank barn.

It was added to the National Register of Historic Places in 1973.
