= Utrenja =

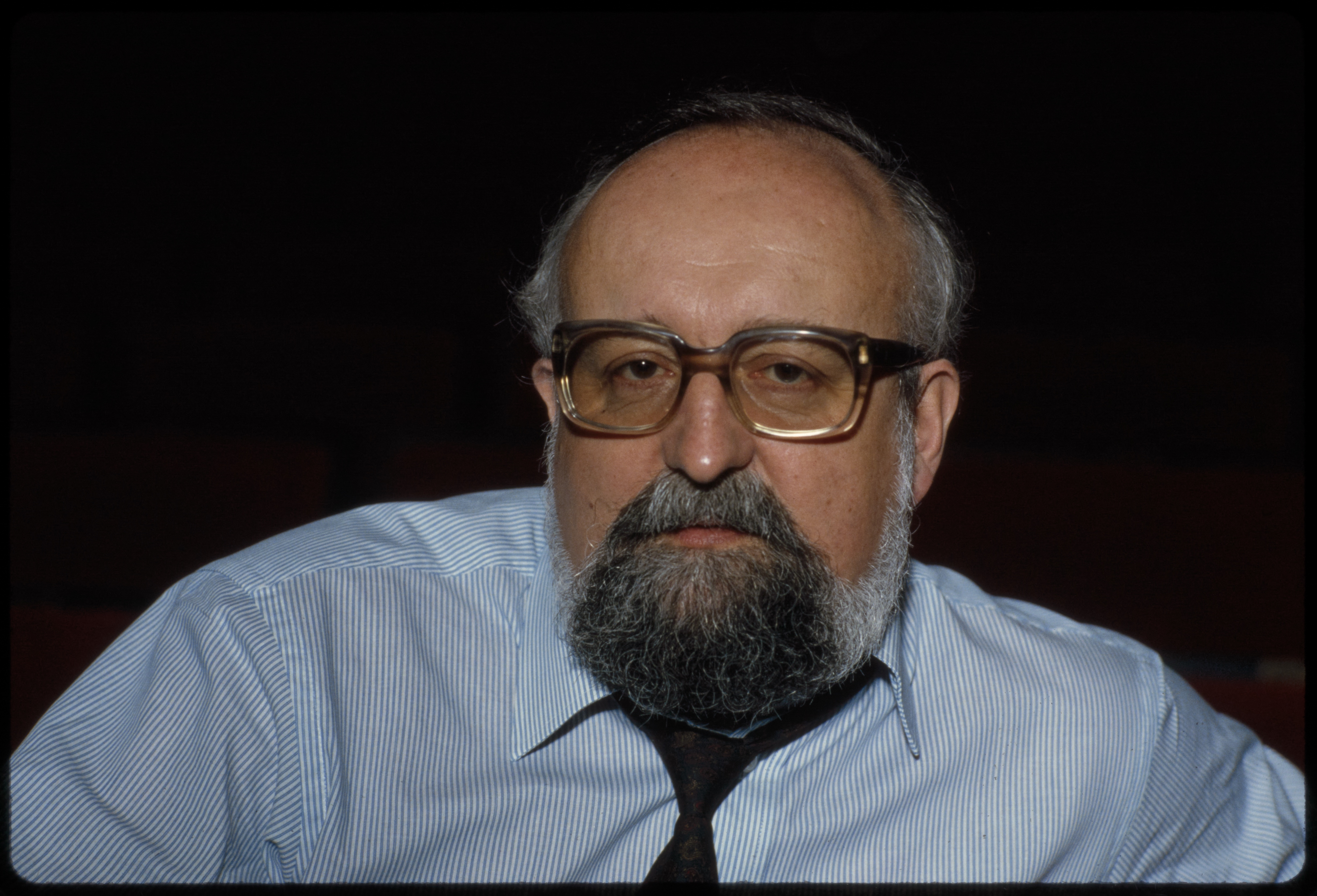
Krzysztof Penderecki in the 1980s

Utrenja, alternatively spelled as Utrenia, Utrenya, or Jutrznia, and sometimes also translated as Matins, is a set of two liturgical compositions by Polish composer Krzysztof Penderecki. They were composed and premiered in 1970 and 1971.

"Jutrznia" in this context refers to "Matins of the Passion of Jesus" in Eastern Orthodox rites (Polish: "Jutrznia Męki Pańskiej", Russian/Church Slavonic: "Utrenja Strastiej Khristovych").

== History ==
Following his Stabat Mater, Penderecki garnered certain fame in avant-garde circles, though, in respect to his upcoming radicalism and emotional directness in his orchestral works, this led to musicians and music lovers to turn their backs on him under accusations of him being reactionary and on disrupting musical progress. In fact, Russian authorities banned the piece, which could only be performed in Russia in 1995.

== Conception and composition ==
The two parts of Utrenja were conceived and written separately, even though at the time of the latter's premiere, the two parts became strongly associated and started to be performed together generally. Penderecki himself and some critics have associated it also with St. Luke Passion, which would make it a triptych cycle; however, the complete version of Utrenja is recorded and performed separately, with no connections to St. Luke's Passion or Stabat Mater.

As a liturgical composition, Utrenja Part I is inspired by the Orthodox ritual of Holy Saturday and, therefore, is focused on the lamentation, passion and entombment of Christ; on the other hand, Utrenja Part II is based on the morning service of Easter Sunday, which commemorates and renders homage to the resurrection of Christ. The text from both parts has been taken from Old Church Slavonic writings.

Both parts were commissioned by the West German Radio. Part I was premiered in Altenberg on April 8, 1970, under the baton of Andrzej Markowski. Part II was premiered in Münster, again under Markowski, on May 28, 1971. This performance was followed by Part I; however, the premiere of the complete version of Utrenja took place in Kraków, on September 16, 1971, under Jerzy Katlewicz. Critical and audience reception of the work was tumultuous, partly due to the Polish government crackdown following the Gdansk shipyard riots.

== Analysis ==
Given that Utrenja is a set of two different compositions, their movements are numbered separately. A typical performance of the complete work would last 75–80 minutes to perform. The original published score leaves all movements of Part I untitled except No. 5, which is entitled Irmologion. Part II, however, has no movement division, and is presented without pauses or a discernible separation of sections. The most common movement list used in all published recordings of the piece is as follows:

Part I: Złożenie Chrystusa do grobu (The Entombment of Christ)
1. Troparion
2. Pieśni Pochwalne (Songs of Praise)
3. Irmos
4. Kanon Wielkiej Soboty, Pieśń 9 (Canon of Holy Saturday, Song 9)
5. Irmologion (Stichira)
Part II: Zmartwychwstanie Pańskie (The Resurrection of Christ)

1. Ewangelia (The Gospel)
2. Stichira
3. Psalm z Troparionem (Psalm with Troparion)
4. Kanon Paschy, Pieśni 1, 3 (Passover Canon, Songs 1 and 3)
5. Kanon Paschy, Pieśń 8 (Passover Canon, Song 8)
6. Kontakion
7. Ikos
8. Kanon Paschy, Fragmenty (Passover Canon, Fragments)

Part I is scored for 2 mixed choirs, 5 solo voices and symphony orchestra, whereas Part II is scored for choir, boys' choir, 5 solo voices and symphony orchestra.

== Reception ==
This composition received mixed reviews from critics. Krzysztof Penderecki himself stated in a radio interview prior to the work's premiere that he reached his own musical style with the composition and the opinion of critics did not concern him. Tadeusz Marek considered the first performance a "complete success" characterised by "chilling and static immobility". The premiere of both parts was also reviewed by Melos, where Monika Lichtenfeld praised the compositional techniques used by Penderecki. Miles Kastendieck praised the sonoristic innovation and its relation to the work's overall success. German magazine Neue Zeitschrift für Musik considered it an "emotionally moving piece", while Martin Blindow, from Music und Kirche, stated that Utrenja was "one of the most important large choral works of our time", even though it was not intended for liturgic performance.

Peter Benary, however, acknowledged the work's "dynamic extremes", although the tone clusters were used too often for his taste. Andrew DeRhen, from High Fidelity, considered that Penderecki missed the opportunity to give Utrenja a genuine Eastern flavor, and he used an international modernist style instead; however, other journals praised the composition for the same reason. Tadeusz Kaczyński, also from Ruch Muzyczny, considered the work to be a "contemplative work", and Marian Wallek-Wallewski considered it "extremely boring". Austrian magazine Öesterreichische Musikzeitschrift also stated that the composition "can be easily understood on an emotional level by listeners, despite its passages of clusters and its lack of clear tonality." Mirosław Kondracki, from Ruch Muzyczny, was greatly surprised by the dramatic effect of Part I, but was disappointed in Part II, which he considered to be a throwback to Penderecki's St. Luke's Passion. Gerhard Kramer, from Melos, thought that the piece is "musically attractive, with its fascinating treatment of clusters combined with the sounds of old Slavic church music."

The composition also received mixed reviews in performances other than the premiere. Robert Moevs, from Musical Quarterly, gave a negative review for Utrenja, which he thought it used "rudimentary tendencies and superficial complexity", while "Denver", from Musical Journal, stated that the piece was "overstated", even though he praised the solos and the religious exultation. In a performance in Rotterdam, Trevor Richardson, from Music and Musicians, considered the work of little interest, but "no more boring than a great deal of other perfectly acceptable music of all periods.”

Ewangelia and Kanon Paschy, Pieśń 8 from Part II, along with other pieces by Penderecki, were used in the 1980 Stanley Kubrick film The Shining, along with pieces by Wendy Carlos, György Ligeti, and Béla Bartók.

== Notable recordings ==
Notable recordings of this composition include:

Orchestra	Conductor	Record Company	Year of Recording	Format
Warsaw Philharmonic	Andrzej Markowski	Polskie Nagrania Muza (Poland, later internationally; all releases since 1972); Philips Records (internationally, 1973 LP release)	1972	LP (CD)
Warsaw Philharmonic	Antoni Wit	Naxos Records	2008	CD
