= Kateryna Kasper =

Ukrainian operatic soprano (born 1986)

- Born: 1986 (age 38–39); Ukraine
- Occupation: Operatic soprano
- Organizations: Oper Frankfurt; Staatsoper Berlin
- Website: katerynakasper.de/en/

Kateryna Kasper (born 1986) is a Ukrainian operatic soprano. A member of the Oper Frankfurt from 2014, she has appeared in major international opera houses. She has performed in recitals and recordings. Her broad repertoire includes works from Cavalieri's Spiel von Seele und Körper to the world premiere of Der goldene Drache by Péter Eötvös.

== Career ==
Kasper studied voice at the Prokofiev State Music Academy in Donetsk. After her bachelor exam, she continued her studies on a scholarship by the Deutscher Akademischer Austauschdienst at the Hochschule für Musik Nürnberg with Edith Wiens. When Wiens moved to New York City, Kasper completed her studies at the Musikhochschule Frankfurt with Hedwig Fassbender, graduating in 2014 with a master's degree and the concert exam. She made her debut at the Oper Frankfurt as Waldvogel in Wagner's Siegfried in 2012, in a production of the Ring cycle that was recorded. In 2013, she appeared as Anima in Cavalieri's Spiel von Seele und Körper, and a reviewer noted the lyrical quality of her voice.

Kasper has been a member of the Oper Frankfurt from the 2014/15 season, coming from the company's opera studio. She has performed there roles such as Tigrane in Handel's Radamisto, Susanna in Mozart's Le nozze di Figaro, Zerlina in his Don Giovanni, Nannetta in Verdi's Falstaff, Gretel in Humperdinck's Hänsel und Gretel, and Sophie in Der Rosenkavalier by Richard Strauss. In 2014, she appeared in the leading roles (Young woman / The little Chinese) in the premiere of Der goldene Drache by Péter Eötvös, with the composer conducting the Ensemble Modern. A reviewer noted that she mastered long lines bordering on the ecstatic, but also cat-like sounds when suffering from toothache, combined with lively acting. She appeared at the Los Angeles Opera as Belinda in Purcell's Dido and Aeneas that year, staged by Barrie Kosky, alongside Paula Murrihy as Dido and Liam Bonner as Aeneas. In 2015, again in Frankfurt, she was Antonida, the hero's daughter, in Mikhail Glinka's Iwan Sussanin in a production staged by Harry Kupfer. A reviewer wrote that she presented her first aria, longing for her beloved, with vocal intensity and convincing acting. In 2021, she performed as on the Bockenheimer Depot stage as Venus in Mozart's Ascanio with Cecelia Hall in the title role, the son of Venus. She appeared as Angelica in Handel's Orlando in 2023, alongside Zanda Švēde in the title role and Christopher Lowrey as Medoro.

She was awarded first prize at the Mirjam Helin International Singing Competition in Helsinki in 2014. In 2018, she recorded the soprano part in Bach's St John Passion live with Raphaël Pichon conducting the Ensemble Pygmalion, Julian Prégardien as the Evangelist and Tomáš Král as the vox Christi.
