= Mahler Symphony No. 8 discography =

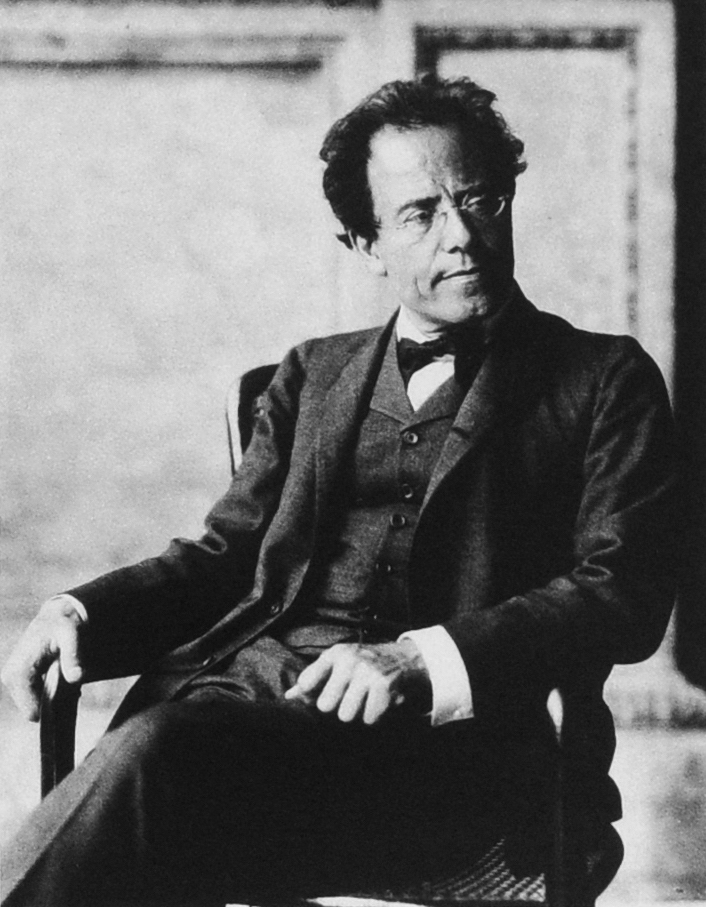
Gustav Mahler in 1907

This is a discography of commercial recordings of Gustav Mahler’s Symphony No. 8.

The first commercially issued recording of the work was performed by the Rotterdam Philharmonic Orchestra conducted by Eduard Flipse, recorded live by Philips at the 1954 Holland Festival. In 1962, the New York Philharmonic conducted by Leonard Bernstein made the first stereo recording of Part I for Columbia Records. This was followed in 1964 by the first stereo recording of the complete symphony, performed by the Utah Symphony conducted by Maurice Abravanel.

Since the Eighth was first recorded, at least 70 recordings of it have been made, by many of the world's leading orchestras and singers, mostly during live performances. This number includes recordings which were for private or limited distribution and were not issued under commercial record labels.

Some of the recordings have won high critical praise. On its first release in CD form in 1988 the historic Stokowski recording was described by critic Kevin Conklin as "the most consistently satisfying performance of the Mahler Eighth I know, and a powerful argument for preferring a live recording of the work". Simon Rattle's 2004 version with the City of Birmingham Symphony Orchestra was BBC Music Magazine Disc of the Month for May 2005, and was Gramophone magazine's Disc of the Month in April 2007. A Leonard Bernstein 1975 recording, when issued in DVD format in 2005, was Gramophone's DVD of the Month choice in February 2006. The DVD of the Klaus Tennstedt 1991 recording, praised for its "passionate commitment", was a finalist in the annual Gramophone Awards in 2007.

== Audio recordings ==
Year	Conductor	Orchestra	Soloists	Choirs	Label (Note: The label indicated is that of the most recent issue of the recording, usually in CD form)	Notes
1950	Leopold Stokowski	New York Philharmonic	Frances Yeend, Uta Graf, Camilla Williams, Martha Lipton, Louise Bernhardt, Eugene Conley, Carlos Alexander, George London	Westminster Choir; Schola Cantorum of New York; Public School Boys' Chorus	Music & Arts Programs (CD)	Live performance 9 April 1950
1951	Hermann Scherchen	Vienna Symphony	Elsa Marie Mattheis, Daniza Ilitsch, Rosette Anday, Georgine von Milinkovič, Erich Majcut, Otto Wiener, Georg Oeggl	Wiener Akademiekammerchor; Wiener Singakademie; Wiener Knabenchor	Tahra classical recordings (CD)	Live performance 13 June 1951
1954	Eduard Flipse	Rotterdam Philharmonic Orchestra	Annelies Kupper, Hilde Zadek, Corry Bijster, Annie Hermes, Lore Fischer, Annie Woud, Lorenz Fehenberger, Frans Vroons, Hermann Prey, Gottlob Frick, David Hollestelle	Rotterdam Philharmonic Choir; combined Rotterdam choirs; St Willibrord's children's choir	Philips	Live performance, 3 July 1954
1954	Winfried Zillig	NDR Symphony Orchestra	Annelies Kupper, Ilona Steingruber, Dorothea Forster-Georgi, Maria von Ilosvay, Ursula Zollenkopf, Lorenz Fehenberger, Hermann Prey, Franz Crass, Dietrich Fischer-Dieskau	Kölner Rundfunkchor; Chor der Hamburger Musikhochschule; Städtischer Chor Hamburg; Knabenchor der Oberschule Eppendorf	Gala (CD)	Live performance, 29–30 November 1954
1959	Jascha Horenstein	London Symphony Orchestra	Joyce Barker, Agnes Giebel, Beryl Hatt, Kerstin Meyer, Helen Watts, Kenneth Neate, Alfred Orda, Arnold van Mill	BBC Chorus; BBC Choral Society; Goldsmiths Choral Union; Hampstead Choral Society; Orpington Junior Singers; Emanuel School Boys' Choir	BBC Legends (CD)	Live performance, 20 March 1959
1960	Dimitri Mitropoulos	Vienna Philharmonic	Mimi Coertse, Hilde Zadek, Lucretia West, Ira Malaniuk, Giuseppe Zampieri, Hermann Prey, Otto Edelmann	Vienna State Opera chorus; Wiener Singverein; Wiener Sängerknaben	ORFEO (CD)	Live performance, 28 August 1960
1962	Leonard Bernstein	New York Philharmonic	Adele Addison, Lucine Amara, Lili Chookaskian, Jennie Tourel, Richard Tucker, Ezio Flagello, George London	Schola Cantorum of New York; Juilliard Chorus; Columbus Boychoir	CBS Masterworks (CD)	Live performance, 23 September 1962; Veni Creator Spiritus only
1963	Maurice Abravanel	Utah Symphony	Jeanine Grader, Lynn Owen, Blanche Christensen, Nancy Williams, Marlena Kleinman, Stanley Kolk, David Clatworthy, Malcolm Smith	University of Utah Civic Chorale; Salt Lake City Children's Choir	Vanguard (CD)	Studio recording December 1963
1966	Leonard Bernstein	London Symphony Orchestra	Erna Spoorenberg, Gwyneth Jones, Gwenyth Annear, Anna Reynolds, Norma Procter, John Mitchinson, Vladimir Ruzdjak, Donald McIntyre	London Symphony Chorus; Leeds Festival Chorus; the Orpington Junior Singers; Highgate Schoolboys' Choir; Finchley Children's Music Group	CBS Masterworks (CD)	Taped at Walthamstow Assembly Hall, April 18–20, 1966
1970	Rafael Kubelík	Bavarian Radio Symphony Orchestra	Martina Arroyo, Erna Spoorenberg, Edith Mathis, Julia Hamari, Norma Procter, Donald Grobe, Dietrich Fischer-Dieskau, Franz Crass	Chöre des Bayerischen, Norddeutschen und Westdeutschen Rundfunks; Knaben der Regensburger Domspatzen; Frauenchor des Münchener Motettenchors	Deutsche Grammophon (CD)	Studio recording 25–26 June 1970
1971	Georg Solti	Chicago Symphony Orchestra	Heather Harper, Lucia Popp, Arleen Auger, Yvonne Minton, Helen Watts, René Kollo, John Shirley-Quirk, Martti Talvela	Vienna State Opera chorus; Wiener Singverein; Wiener Sängerknaben	Decca (CD)	Studio recording, 30 August – 1 September 1971
1971	Bernard Haitink	Concertgebouw Orchestra	Ileana Cotrubaș, Heather Harper, Hanneke van Bork, Birgit Finnilä, Marianne Dielman, William Cochran, Hermann Prey, Hans Sotin	Toonkunstkoor; de Stem des Volks; Kinderkoor St Willibrord; Collegium Musicum Amstelodamense	Pentatone (CD)	Studio recording 16–19 September 1971
1972	Takashi Asahina	Osaka Philharmonic Orchestra	Sakae Himoto, Harumi Okada, Kasuko Nagai, Tokiko Katsura, Kiyoko Haba, Tomijiro Ito, Takashi Mimuro, Ryozo Tate	Osaka College of Music and Men's Choruses; Asahi Chorus; Ivy Chorus; Kansai Opera and Quodelibet Choruses; Kobe and Nara Broadcasting Children Choruses	Vox	Live performance, 5–6 July 1972
1972	Wyn Morris	Symphonica of London	Joyce Barker, Elisabeth Simon, Norma Burrowes, Joyce Blackham, Alfreda Hodgson, John Mitchinson, Raymond Myer, Gwyne Howell	The Ambrosian Singers; New Philharmonia Orchestra Chorus; the Bruckner-Mahler Choir of London; Highgate School Choir; the Orpington Junior Singers; Finchley Children's Music Group	SYMR	Studio recording, 20–22 November 1972
1975	Pierre Boulez	BBC Symphony Orchestra	Edda Moser, Linda Esther Gray, Wendy Eathorne, Elisabeth Connel, Bernadette Greevy, Alberto Remedios, Siegmund Nimsgern, Marius Rintzler	BBC Chorus; BBC Choral Society; BBC Scottish National Chorus; Wandsworth School Boys' Choir	Artists	Live performance 25 July 1975
1975	Leonard Bernstein	Vienna Philharmonic	Margaret Price, Judith Blegen, Gerti Zeumer, Trudeliese Schmidt, Agnes Baltsa, Kenneth Riegel, Hermann Prey, José van Dam	Chorus of Vienna State Opera; Wiener Singverein; Wiener Sängerknaben	Deutsche Grammophon (CD)	Live at the Großes Festspielhaus, Salzburg, on 30 August 1975
1979	James Levine	Chicago Symphony Orchestra	Carol Neblett, Judith Blegen, Jann Jaffe, Isola Jones, Birgit Finnilä, Kenneth Riegel, Ryan Edwards, John Cheek	Chicago Symphony Chorus; Glen Ellyn Children's Chorus	CSO	Live performance 6 July 1979; Veni Creator Spiritus only
1979	Kazuo Yamada	Tokyo Metropolitan Symphony Orchestra	Katsura Nakazawa, Mitsuko Sakai, Eiko Soga, Hiroko Kimura, Minako Nagano, Masaru Itabashi, Tadahiko Hirano, Takao Okkamura	Shonan Shimin Choir; Choeur Croix; Shonan Children Choir; Chigasaki Mixed Choir; Odawara Male Choir	CBS	Live performance 12 February 1979
1980	Seiji Ozawa	Boston Symphony Orchestra	Faye Robinson, Judith Blegen, Deborah Sasson, Florence Quivar, Lorna Myers, Kenneth Riegel, Benjamin Luxon, Gwynne Howell	Tanglewood Symphony Chorus; Boston Boys' Choir	Philips	From live performances, October–November 1980
1981	Michael Gielen	Frankfurter Opern- und Museumsorchester	Faye Robinson, Margaret Anne Marshall, Hildegard Heichele, Ortrun Wenkel, Hildegard Laurich, Mallory Walker, Richard Stilwell, Simon Estes	Figuralchor des Hessischen Rundfunks; Frankfurter Kantorei; Frankfurter Singakademie; Limburger Domsingknaben	Sony (CD)	Live performance 28 August 1981
1982	Václav Neumann	Czech Philharmonic orchestra	Gabriela Beňačková, Inge Nielsen, Daniéla Sounova, Věra Soukupová, Libuše Márová, Thomas Moser, Wolfgang Schöne, Richard Novak	Czech Philharmonic Choir; Czech Radio Symphony Orchestra choir; Prague Philharmonic Children's Choir	Supraphon (CD)	Studio recording February 1982
1986	Klaus Tennstedt	London Philharmonic Orchestra	Elisabeth Connell, Edith Wiens, Felicity Lott, Trudeliese Schmidt, Nadine Denize, Richard Versalle, Jorma Hynninen, Hans Sotin	London Philharmonic Choir; Tiffin Schoolboys' Choir	EMI (CD)	Studio recording, April and October 1986
1986	Lorin Maazel	Vienna Philharmonic	Sylvia Greenberg, Roberta Alexander, Angela-Maria Blasi, Jessye Norman, Christa Ludwig, Werner Hollweg, Bernd Weikl, Kurt Rydl	Vienna State Opera Chorus; Tölz Boys' Choir	Pandora's Box (CD)	Live performance 4 August 1986
1986	Eliahu Inbal	Frankfurt Radio Symphony Orchestra	Faye Robinson, Teresa Cahill, Hildegard Heichele, Livia Budai, Jane Henschel, Kenneth Riegel, Hermann Prey, Harald Stamm	Radio choirs NDR Chor, WDR Rundfunkchor Köln, Bayerischer Rundfunkchor; Südfunk-Chor Stuttgart; RIAS Kammerchor; Limburger Domsingknaben; Hessischer Rundfunk Knabenchor	Brilliant Classics (CD)	Studio recording, October 1986
1989	Lorin Maazel	Vienna Philharmonic	Sharon Sweet, Pamela Coburn, Florence Quivar, Brigitte Fassbaender, Richard Leech, Siegmund Nimsgern, Simon Estes	Vienna State Opera Chorus; O.R.F. Choir; Arnold Schönberg Choir; Wiener Sängerknaben	Sony (CD)	Studio recording, June 1989
1989	Ondrej Lenárd	Shinsei Nihon Symphony Orchestra	Konomi Nagoya, Fumiko Nishimatsu, Yoko Oshima, Misato Iwamori, Yuko Ofuji, Eiji Date, Hidemori Komatsu, Yasuo Yoshino	Shinsei-Nikkyo Chorus; Tokyo Laien Choir; the Little Spiritual Fantastic Singers in Arakawa, Tokyo	Club La bohème (CD)	Live performance, 8 and 10 June 1989
1990	Giuseppe Sinopoli	Philharmonia Orchestra	Cheryl Studer, Angela-Maria Blasi, Sumi Jo, Waltraud Meier, Kasuko Nagai, Keith Lewis, Thomas Allen, Hans Sotin	Philharmonia Chorus; Southend Boys' Choir	Philips (CD)	Studio recording, November–December 1990
1991	Hiroshi Wakasugi	Tokyo Metropolitan Symphony Orchestra	Shinobu Satoh, Misako Watanabe, Yukie Ohkura, Naoko Ihara, Yuri Ohhashi, Makoto Hayashi, Futoru Katsube, Keizo Takahashi	Shin-Yukai Chorus; Tokyo Broadcasting Children Chorus	Fontec (CD)	Live performance 24 January 1991
1991	Klaus Tennstedt	London Philharmonic Orchestra	Júlia Várady, Jane Eaglen, Susan Bullock, Trudeliese Schmidt, Jadwiga Rappé, Kenneth Riegel, Eike Wilm Schulte, Hans Sotin	London Philharmonic Chorus; London Symphony Chorus; Eton College Boys' Chorus	BBC recording (CD)	Recorded live by BBC Television at Southbank Centre's Royal Festival Hall, London 27 January 1991
1991	Emil Tabakov	Sofia Philharmonic Orchestra	Lyudmila Hadzhieva, Tamara Takac, Boryana Tabakova, Janos Bandi, Pal Kovacs, Tamash Syule	Bulgarian National Choir "Svetoslav Obretenov"; Choir of Bulgarian National Radio; Children's Choir of Bulgarian National Radio	Capriccio (CD)	Studio recording, June 1991
1991	Robert Shaw	Atlanta Symphony Orchestra	Deborah Voigt, Margaret Jane Wray, Heidi Grant, Delores Ziegler, Marietta Simpson, Michael Sylvester, William Stone, Kenneth Cox	Atlanta Symphony Orchestra Choir; Ohio State University Chorale; Ohio State University Symphonic Choir; Master Chorale of Tampa Bay; Atlanta Boy Choir	TELARC (CD)	Studio recording, April 1991
1991	Gary Bertini	Kölner Westdeutschen Rundfunk Sinfonie Orchester,	Júlia Várady, Mari-Ann Häggender, Maria Venuti, Ann Howells, Florence Quivar, Paul Frey, Alan Titus, Siegfried Vogel	Chor des Westdeutschen Rundfunk; chor des Süddeutschen Rundfunk Stuttgart; Prague Philharmonic Choir; The Little Singers of Tokyo	EMI (CD)	Live performance 12 November 1991
1993	Anton Nanut	Simfoniki RTV Slovenija, Ljubljana,	Eva Kirchner, Elisabeth Kim, Anne Schwanewilms, Etsuko Katagiri, Daniel Kim, Jochem Schmeckenbecher, Martin Krasnenko	Hungarian Jeunesses Choir; Slovenski Komorni Zbor; Zbor Consortium Musicum; Otroski Zbor RTV Slovenia	Digital Concerto CCT 745 (CD)	
1993	Leif Segerstam	Danish Radio Symphony Orchestra	Inga Nielsen, Majken Bjerno, Henriette Blonde-Hanson, Kirsten Dolberg, Anne Gjevang, Raimo Sirkiä, Jorma Hynninen, Carsten Stabell	Danish Radio Chorus; Berlin Philharmonic Choir; Københavns Drengekor	Chandos (CD)	Studio recording, August 1993
1994	Claudio Abbado	Berlin Philharmonic	Cheryl Studer, Sylvia McNair, Andrea Rost, Anne Sofie von Otter, Rosemarie Lang, Peter Seiffert, Bryn Terfel, Jan-Hendrik Rootering	Berlin Radio Choir; Prague Philharmonic Choir; Tölzer Knabenchor	Deutsche Grammophon (CD)	Live performance February 1994
1994	Edo de Waart	Netherlands Philharmonic Orchestra	Alessandra Marc, Gwynne Geyer, Regina Nathan, Doris Soffel, Nancy Maultsby, Vinson Cole, David Wilson-Johnson, Andrea Silvestrelli	Netherlands Philharmonic Choir; Leipzig Opera Chorus; Stadsknapenkoor, Elburg	RCA (CD)	Live performance, 17 September 1994
1994	Neeme Järvi	Gothenburg Symphony Orchestra	Ulla Gustafsson, Mari-Ann Häggender, Carolina Sandgren, Ulrika Tenstam, Anne Gjevang, Seppo Ruohonen, Mats Persson, Johann Tilli	Gothenburg Opera Chorus; Gothenburg Symphony Chorus; Kungliga Filharmoniska Kören i Stockholm; Brunnsbokŏren; Estonian Boys' Choir	BIS (CD)	Live performance 25 November 1994
1995	Riccardo Chailly	Concertgebouw Orchestra	Alessandra Marc, Julia Faulkner, Cyndia Sieden, Jard van Nes, Birgit Remmert, Gary Lakes, Andreas Schmidt, Robert Holl	Kühn Mixed Choir; Prague Philharmonic Choir; Breda Sacrament and Youth Choirs; St. Bavo Cathedral, Haarlem, Youth Choir	Q-Disc,	Live performance 15 May 1995
1995	Michiyoshi Inoue	Kyoto Symphony Orchestra	Shinobu Sato, Minako Shioda, Yuko Kamahora, Masako Teshima, Kazuko Nagai, Akeshi Wakamoto, Akiya Fukushima, Toshihiko Yamaguchi	Kyoto InterUniversity Chorus; Kyoto Boys' Chorus	OCD (CD)	Live performance 18 October 1995
1996	Colin Davis	Bavarian Radio Symphony Orchestra	Alessandra Marc, Sharon Sweet, Elisabeth Norberg-Schulz, Vesselina Kasarova, Ning Liang, Ben Heppner, Sergei Leiferkus, René Pape	Bavarian Radio Choir; Berlin Radio Choir; Südfunk-Chor Stuttgart; Tölzer Knabenchor	RCA (CD)	Live performance July 1996
1996	Evgeni Svetlanov	Russian State Symphony Orchestra	Galina Boiko, Natalia Guerassimova, Galina Borissova, Olga Alexandrova, Alexeï Martynov, Dimitri Trapeznikov, Anatoly Safiouline	Children's and Double Mixed Choirs of the Moscow Academy of Choral Singing	Warner Classics (CD)	Studio recording, August–September 1996
1998	Michael Gielen	SWR Sinfonieorchester Baden-Baden und Freiburg	Alessandra Marc, Margaret Jane Wray, Christiane Boesiger, Dagmar Pecková, Eugenia Grunewald, Glenn Winslade, Anthony Michaels-Moore, Peter Lika	EuropaChorAkademie; Aurelius Sängerknaben	Hänssler (CD)	Live performances, 8–18 December 1998
2000	Riccardo Chailly	Concertgebouw Orchestra, Amsterdam	Jane Eaglen, Anne Schwanewilms, Ruth Ziesak, Sara Fulgoni, Anna Larsson, Ben Heppner, Peter Mattei, Jan-Hendrik Rootering	Groot Omroepkoor; Prague Philharmonic Choir; Breda Sacrament Choir and Youth Choir; St. Bavo Cathedral, Haarlem, Youth Choir	Decca (CD)	Studio recording, January 2000
2000	Geoffrey Simon	Northwest Mahler Festival Orchestra	Victoria Gydov, Hyun Joo Yang, Catherine Haight, Janna Waechter, Diane Radabaugh, Leslie Green, Stephen Janzen, Michael Delos	Northwest Mahler Festival Chorus	NWMF (CD)	Live performance, 16 July 2000
2001	Francisco Savín	Orquesta Sinfónica de Xalapa	Encarnación Vazquez, Angelina Rojas, Lourdez Ambriz, Grace Echauri, Verónica Alexanderson, José Guadalupe Reyes, Jesús Suaste, Noé Colin	Choir and Chamber Choir of Universidad Veracruzana; Händel Choir; La Pequeña Cantoria	Tharsis (CD)	Live performance June 2001
2002	Lorin Maazel	Bavarian Radio Symphony Orchestra	Sharon Sweet, Angela Maria Blasi, Laura Aikin, Cornelia Kallisch, Brigitte Pinter, Glenn Winlade, Jan-Hendrik Rootering, Siegmund Nimsgern	Bavarian Radio Choir; Berlin Radio Choir; Südfunk-Chor Stuttgart; Tölzer Knabenchor	En Larmes (CD)	Live performance 6 June 2002
2003	Neil Mantle	Scottish Sinfonia	Soloists not identified	Edinburgh Bach Choir; Edinburgh Royal Choral Union; Edinburgh Youth Choir; Jubilo	Scottish Sinfonia (CD)	Live performance November 2003
2004	Kent Nagano	Deutsches Symphonie-Orchester Berlin	Sylvia Greenberg, Lynne Dawson, Sally Matthews, Sophie Koch, Elena Manistina, Robert Gambill, Detlef Roth, Jan-Hendrik Rootering	Rundfunkchor Berlin; MDR Rundfunkchor Leipzig; Windsbacher Knabenchor	Harmonia Mundi (CD)	Studio recording April–May 2004
2004	Gary Bertini	Tokyo Metropolitan Orchestra	Tomoko Nakamura, Emi Sawahate, Miwako Handa, Setsuko Takemoto, Kei Fukui, Akiya Fukushima, Akira Hasegawa	Shin-Yukai Choir; Shinjuku Bunka Center 25th Anniversary Choir; the Little Spiritual Fantastic Singers in Arakawa, Tokyo	Fontec (CD)	Live performance 20 May 2004
2004	Simon Rattle	City of Birmingham Symphony Orchestra, National Youth Orchestra of Great Britain	Christine Brewer, Soile Isokoski, Juliane Banse, Birgit Remmert, Jane Henschel, Jon Villars, David Wilson-Johnson, John Relyea	City of Birmingham Symphony Youth Chorus; Toronto Children's Chorus; Sydney Philharmonia Choirs; London Symphony Chorus; City of Birmingham Symphony Chorus	EMI (CD)	Live performance August 2002
2005	Rudolf Piehlmayer	Augsburger Philharmoniker	Sally du Randt, Petra van der Mieden, Victoria Loukianetz, Kathrin Koch, Vuokko Kekäläinen, Riccardo Lombardi, Selçuk Hakan Tiraşoğlu	Chorus Theater Augsburg, Philharmonischer Chor Augsburg; Augsburger Vokalensemble; Augsburger Domsingknaben; Augsburg Cathedral Choir	Theater Augsburg (CD)	Live performance, Juli 2005
2006	Antoni Wit	Orkiestra Symfoniczna Filharmonii Narodowej	Barbara Kubiak, Isabela Klosinska, Marta Boberska, Jadwiga Rappé, Ewa Marciniec, Timothy Bentch, Wojtek Drabowicz, Piotr Nowacki	Chór Filharmonii Narodowej; Chór Uniwersytetu Kardynała Stefana Wyszynskiego, Warszawski Chór Chłopięcy i Męski	Naxos (CD)	Studio Recording 2006
2007	Pierre Boulez	Staatskapelle Berlin	Twyla Robinson, Erin Wall, Adriane Queiroz, Michelle DeYoung, Simone Schröder, Johan Botha, Hanno Müller-Brachmann, Robert Holl	Chor der Deutschen Staatsoper Berlin; Rundfunkchor Berlin; Aurelius Sängerknaben	Deutsche Grammophon (CD)	Studio recording, April 2007
2008	Valery Gergiev	London Symphony Orchestra	Viktoria Yastrebova, Ailish Tynan, Liudmilla Dudinova, Lilli Paasikivi, Zlata Bulycheva, Sergey Semishkur, Alexey Maekov, Evgeny Nikitin	London Symphony Chorus; Choral Arts Society of Washington; Choir of Eltham College	LSO (SACD)	Live performance 9 July 2008
2008	Michael Tilson Thomas	San Francisco Symphony Orchestra	Erin Wall, Elza van den Heever, Laura Claycomb, Katarina Karneus, Yvonne Naef, Anthony Dean Griffey, Quinn Kelsey, James Morris	San Francisco Symphony Chorus; Pacific Boychoir; San Francisco Girls Chorus	San Francisco Symphony (SACD)	Live performance 19 November 2008
2010	David Zinman	Tonhalle Orchester Zürich	Melanie Diener, Juliane Banse, Anna Larsson, Yvonne Naef, Birgit Remmert, Anthony Dean Griffey, Stephen Powell, Ildar Abdrazakov	Schweizer Kammerchor; WDR Rundfunkchor Köln; Zürcher Sängerknaben; Kinderchor Kaltbrunn	RCA (CD)	Recorded 27 February–3 March 2009, Tonhalle, Zurich
2008	Gerard Schwarz	Seattle Symphony Orchestra	Jane Eaglen, Lauren Flanigan, Jane Giering de Hann, Jane Gilbert, Nancy Maultsby, Clayton Brainherd, Vinson Cole, Harold Wilson	Seattle Symphony Chorale; Seattle Pro Musica; Northwest Boychoir	Seattle Symphony	Live performance 25 September 2008
2011	Mariss Jansons	Royal Concertgebouw Orchestra	Christine Brewer, Camilla Nylund, Maria Espada, Stephanie Blythe, Mihoko Fujimura, Robert Dean Smith, Tommi Hakala, Stefan Kocán	Netherlands Radio Choir, State Choir 'Latvija', Bavarian Radio Choir, National Boys and Children's Choirs	RCO Live (SACD)	Live performance 4, 6 March 2011
2011	Mariss Jansons	Bavarian Radio Symphony Orchestra	Twyla Robinson, Christine Brewer, Anna Prohaska, Janina Baechle, Mihoko Fujimura, Johan Botha, Michael Volle, Ain Anger	State Choir Latvija, Tölzer Knabenchor, Chor des Bayerischen Rundfunks	BR-Klassik	Live performance October 2011
2011	Klaus Tennstedt	London Philharmonic Orchestra	Júlia Várady, Jane Eaglen, Susan Bullock, Trudeliese Schmidt, Jadwiga Rappé, Kenneth Riegel Eike Wilm Schulte, Hans Sotin	Netherlands Radio Choir, State Choir 'Latvija', Bavarian Radio Choir, National Boys and Children's Choirs	LPO	Live performance from 1991
2013	Jonathan Nott	Bamberg Symphony Orchestra	Michaela Kaune, Marisol Montalvo, Manuela Uhl, Janina Baechle, Lioba Braun, Stefan Vinke, Michael Nagy, Albert Dohmen	Czech Philharmonic Choir, Windsbacher Knabenchor, Bamberg Symphony Chorus	Tudor	Recorded 21–26 July 2010
2013	Markus Stenz	Gürzenich Orchestra Cologne	Barbara Haveman, Orla Boylan, Christiane Oelze, Anna Palimina, Petra Lang, Maria Radner, Brandon Jovanovich, Hanno Müller-Brachmann, Günther Groissböck	Cologne Cathedral Vocal Ensemble, Philharmonische Chor der Stadt Bonn, Cologne Kantorei, Cologne Cathedral Choir, Cologne Bach Vocal Ensemble, Cologne Cathedral Children's Choir	Oehms Classics	Recorded 2012
2015	Lorin Maazel	Philharmonia Orchestra	Sally Matthews, Ailish Tynan, Sarah Tynan, Sarah Connolly, Anne-Marie Owens, Stefan Vinke, Mark Stone, Stephen Gadd	Philharmonia Voices; BBC Symphony Chorus; Eton College Chapel Choir	Signum Classics	Live performance 9 October 2011
2016	Thierry Fischer	Utah Symphony	Orla Boylan, Celena Shafer, Amy Owens, Charlotte Hellekant, Tamara Mumford, Barry Banks, Markus Werba, Jordan Biss	Mormon Tabernacle Choir, the Madeleine Choir School Choristers	Reference Recordings Fresh! (SACD)	Live performance 19, 20 February 2016
2018	Ádám Fischer	Düsseldorfer Symphoniker	Manuela Uhl, Polina Pasztircsák, Fatma Said, Katrin Wundsam, Katharina Magiera, Neal Cooper, Hanno Müller-Brachmann, Peter Rose	Choir of the Städtischer Musikverin zu Düsseldorf, Philharmonischer Chor Bonn, Kartäuserkantorei Köln, Clara-Schumann-Jugendchor-Düsseldorf	Tonhalle Düsseldorf	
2019	Valery Gergiev	Munich Philharmonic	Simone Schneider, Jacquelyn Wagner, Regula Mühlemann, Katharina Magiera, Claudia Mahnke, Simon O'Neill, Michael Nagy, Evgeny Nikitin	Philharmonischer Chor München, Orfeón Donostiarra, Augsburger Domsingknaben	MPHIL (Münchner Philharmoniker)	Philharmonie de Paris, 17 February 2019
2020	Gabriel Feltz	Dortmunder Philharmoniker	Emily Newton, Michaela Kaune, Ashley Thouret, Iris Vermillion, Mihoko Fujimura, Brenden Patrick Gunnell, Markus Eiche, Karl-Heinz Lehner	Czech Philharmonic Choir Brno, Slovak Philharmonic Choir Bratislava, Boys Choir of the Choir Academy Dortmund	Dreyer Gaido 21118	Live performance
2020	Yannick Nézet-Séguin	Philadelphia Orchestra	Angela Meade, Erin Wall, Lisette Oropesa, Elizabeth Bishop, Mihoko Fujimara, Anthony Dean Griffey, Markus Werba, John Relyea	Westminster Symphonic Choir, the Choral Arts Society of Washington, the American Boychoir	Deutsche Grammophon	Verizon Hall, Kimmel Center, March 2016
2021	Gustavo Dudamel	Los Angeles Philharmonic	Tamara Wilson, Leah Crocetto, Erin Morley, Mihoko Fujimura, Tamara Mumford, Simon O'Neill, Ryan McKinny, Morris Robinson	Los Angeles Master Chorale, Pacific Chorale, Los Angeles Children's Chorus, National Children's Chorus	Deutsche Grammophon	Walt Disney Concert Hall, May 2019
2021	Vladimir Jurowski	London Philharmonic Orchestra	Judith Howarth, Anne Schwanewilms, Sofia Fomina, Michaela Selinger, Patricia Bardon, Barry Banks, Stephen Gadd, Matthew Rose	London Philharmonic Choir, London Symphony Chorus	LPO	Live performance
2023	Osmo Vänskä	Minnesota Orchestra	Carolyn Sampson, Jacquelyn Wagner, Sasha Cooke, Jess Dandy, Barry Banks, Julian Orlishausen, Christian Immler	Minnesota Chorale, National Lutheran Choir, Minnesota Boychoir, Angelica Cantanti Youth Choirs	BIS	Live recording from Orchestra Hall, Minneapolis, June 2022
2024	Sir Simon Rattle	Berlin Philharmonic Orchestra	Erika Sunnegardh, Susan Bullock, Anna Prohaska, Lilli Paasikivi, Nathalie Stutzmann, Johan Botha, David Wilson-Johnson, John Relyea	MDR-Rundfunkchor Leipzig, Rundfunkchor Berlin, Knaben des Staats- und Domchors Berlin	Berliner Philharmoniker	Live recording from the Philharmonie Berlin, September 2011

=== Audio recordings in limited circulation ===
These recordings were issued for private or limited circulation.

Year	Conductor	Orchestra	Label
1968?	Gunther Theuring	Bratislava Radio Orchestra	Private edition
1982	André Vandernoot	Brabant Orchestra	RCS (N)
1982	Hiroyuki Iwaki	Waseda University Orchestra	Waseda University
1983	Arpad Joó	Budapest Symphony Orchestra	Hungaroton
1986	Jürgen Jürgens	Hamburg University Orchestra	Private edition
1993	Manfred Schreier	Junges Philharmonisches Orchester Stuttgart	Private edition
1995	Naohiro Totsuka	Tokyo City Philharmonic Orchestra	Tokyo City Philharmonic
1995	Robert Olson	Colorado MahlerFest Orchestra	Mahlerfest
1998	Kenichiro Kobayashi	Japan Philharmonic Orchestra	Exton
2001	Franz Welser-Möst	Gustav Mahler Youth Orchestra	Musicom
2004	Kazuyoshi Akiyama	Tokyo Symphony Orchestra	Fontec
2005	Vladimir Fedoseyev	Tchaikovsky Symphony Orchestra of Moscow Radio	Relief
2008	Eliahu Inbal	Tokyo Metropolitan Symphony Orchestra	Exton (SACD)
2014	Eliahu Inbal	Tokyo Metropolitan Symphony Orchestra	Exton (SACD)

== Video recordings ==
Year	Conductor	Orchestra	Soloists	Choirs	Label	Notes
1975	Leonard Bernstein	Vienna Philharmonic	Edda Moser, Judith Blegen, Gerti Zeumer, Ingrid Mayr, Agnes Baltsa, Kenneth Riegel, Hermann Prey, José van Dam	Vienna State Opera chorus, Wiener Singverein, Wiener Sängerknaben	Deutsche Grammophon	From televised concerts on September 1 and 2, 1975, at the Konzerthaus in Vienna
1991	Klaus Tennstedt	London Philharmonic Orchestra	Júlia Várady, Jane Eaglen, Susan Bullock, Trudeliese Schmidt, Jadwiga Rappe, Kenneth Riegel, Eike Wilm Schulte, Hans Sotin	London Philharmonic Choir, London Symphony Chorus, Eton College Choir	EMI	Live from Royal Festival Hall, London, 27–28 January 1991
2003	Hun-Joung Lim	Bucheon Philharmonic Orchestra	Jee-Wha Shin, Kyung-Hye Nah, Jeong-Won Park, Hyun-Jeong Lee, Hyun-Joo Chang, Hyun-Jae Park, Kee-Hong Cheon, Hyung-Kwang Ryu	Bucheon Civic Chorale, Suwon Civic Chorale, Anyang Civic Chorale, Seongnam City Chorus, World Vision Children's Choir	KBS Media	Live from Seoul Arts Center, 31 May 2003
2011	Riccardo Chailly	Gewandhaus Orchester Leipzig	Erika Sunnegardh, Ricarda Merbeth, Christiane Oelze, Lioba Braun, Gerhild Romberger, Stephen Gould, Dietrich Henschel, Georg Zeppenfeld	MDR Rundfunkchor, Chor der Oper Leipzig, Gewandhaus Choir, Thomanerchor Leipzig, Gewandhaus Children's Choir	Accentus Music	Live from International Mahler Festival, Leipzig
2011	Mariss Jansons	Royal Concertgebouw Orchestra	Christine Brewer, Camilla Nylund, Maria Espada, Stephanie Blythe, Mihoko Fujimura, Robert Dean Smith, Tommi Hakala, Stefan Kocán	Netherlands Radio Choir, State Choir 'Latvija', Bavarian Radio Choir, National Boys and Children's Choirs	RCO Live	Live performance 4, 6 March 2011
2012	Gustavo Dudamel	Simon Bolivar Symphony Orchestra of Venezuela & Los Angeles Philharmonic	Manuela Uhl, Julianna Di Giacomo and Kiera Duffy, Anna Larsson, Charlotte Hellekant, Burkhard Fritz, Brian Mulligan, Alexander Vinogradov	Coro Sinfónico Juvenil Simón Bolívar de Venezuela, Schola Cantorum de Venezuela, Schola Juvenil de Venezuela	Deutsche Grammophon	Live from Teresa Carreño Cultural Complex, Caracas, 17–18 February 2012
2015	Josep Pons	Spanish National Orchestra	Manuela Uhl, Michaela Kaune, Christiane Karg, Zandra McMaster, Charlotte Hellekant, Anthony Dean Griffey, Bo Skovhus, Albert Dohmen	Spanish National Chorus, Community of Madrid Chorus, RTVE Chorus, Chorus of the Technical University of Madrid, Escolanía del Sagrado Corazón de Rosales, Community of Madrid Youth Chorus	Deutsche Grammophon	Live from National Auditorium of Music, Madrid, 1–3 June 2012
2016	Paavo Järvi	Hr-Sinfonieorchester	Erin Wall, Ailish Tynan, Anna Lucia Richter, Alice Coote, Charlotte Hellekant, Nikolai Schukoff, Michael Nagy, Ain Anger	Limburger Domsingknaben, Europa Chor Akademie, Czech Philharmonic Choir Brno	C Major	Live recording from Alte Oper Frankfurt, 24 and 25 May 2013
2017	Riccardo Chailly	Lucerne Festival Orchestra	Ricarda Merbeth, Juliane Banse, Anna Lucia Richter, Sara Mingardo, Mihoko Fujimura, Andreas Schager, Peter Mattei, Samuel Youn	Chor des Bayerischen Rundfunks, Latvian Radio Choir, Orfeón Donostiarra, Tölzer Knabenchor	Accentus Music	Live from Lucerne Festival, 12 August 2016

== Notes and references ==
Notes
