= Natochenny =

Natochenny is a Russian surname. Notable people with the surname include:

- Lev Natochenny (born 1950), Russian-American classical pianist and professor of piano
- Sarah Natochenny (born 1987), American voice actress
