= Dirk Mommertz =

German pianist

Dirk Mommertz (born 12 August 1974) is a German pianist and chamber musician.

== Life ==
=== Education ===
Born in Mainz, Mommertz, grew up in Michelstadt, where he began his musical education on the violin. He was a young student at the Akademie für Tonkunst (Darmstadt), studying violin with Brigitte Fröhlich and piano with Grigory Gruzman. He began studies in 1994 at the Musikhochschule Karlsruhe with André Boainain, continued at the Frankfurt University of Music and Performing Arts with Lev Natochenny, the Hochschule für Musik und Tanz Köln with the Alban Berg Quartet, and the Conservatoire national supérieur de musique et de danse de Paris with Georges Pludermacher. He was further influenced by Misha Katz and Mikhail Bezverkhny.

As soloist on the piano he was accompanied by the BBC National Orchestra of Wales, the Stuttgart Chamber Orchestra, the Philharmonisches Staatsorchester Hamburg, the MDR Leipzig Radio Symphony Orchestra and the Duisburg Philharmonic.

=== Teacher ===
From 2000 to 2005, Mommertz was a lecturer at the Hochschule für Musik Karlsruhe. He was professor for chamber music at the Folkwang University of the Arts in Essen, during 2005 to 2015, and at the Nuremberg University of Music from 2012 to 2015. In 2015, he accepted a position at the University of Music and Performing Arts Munich, where he is professor of Chamber Music.

=== Fauré Quartet ===
In 1995, Mommertz co-founded the Fauré Quartet, Quartet in Residence at the Karlsruhe University of Music together with his fellow students Erika Geldsetzer, Sascha Frömbling and Konstantin Heidrich. The quartet has remained unchanged since forming. The ensemble performs at international concert halls such as the Wigmore Hall in London, the Musikverein, Lincoln Center in New York, Toppan Hall in Tokyo, the Royal Concertgebouw, the Alte Oper in Frankfurt, the Philharmonie Berlin, and the Teatro Colón in Buenos Aires. CD recordings with Deutsche Grammophon and Sony have been awarded by the ECHO Klassik and the Preis der deutschen Schallplattenkritik.
