= Esther Dierkes =

German opera singer (born 1990)

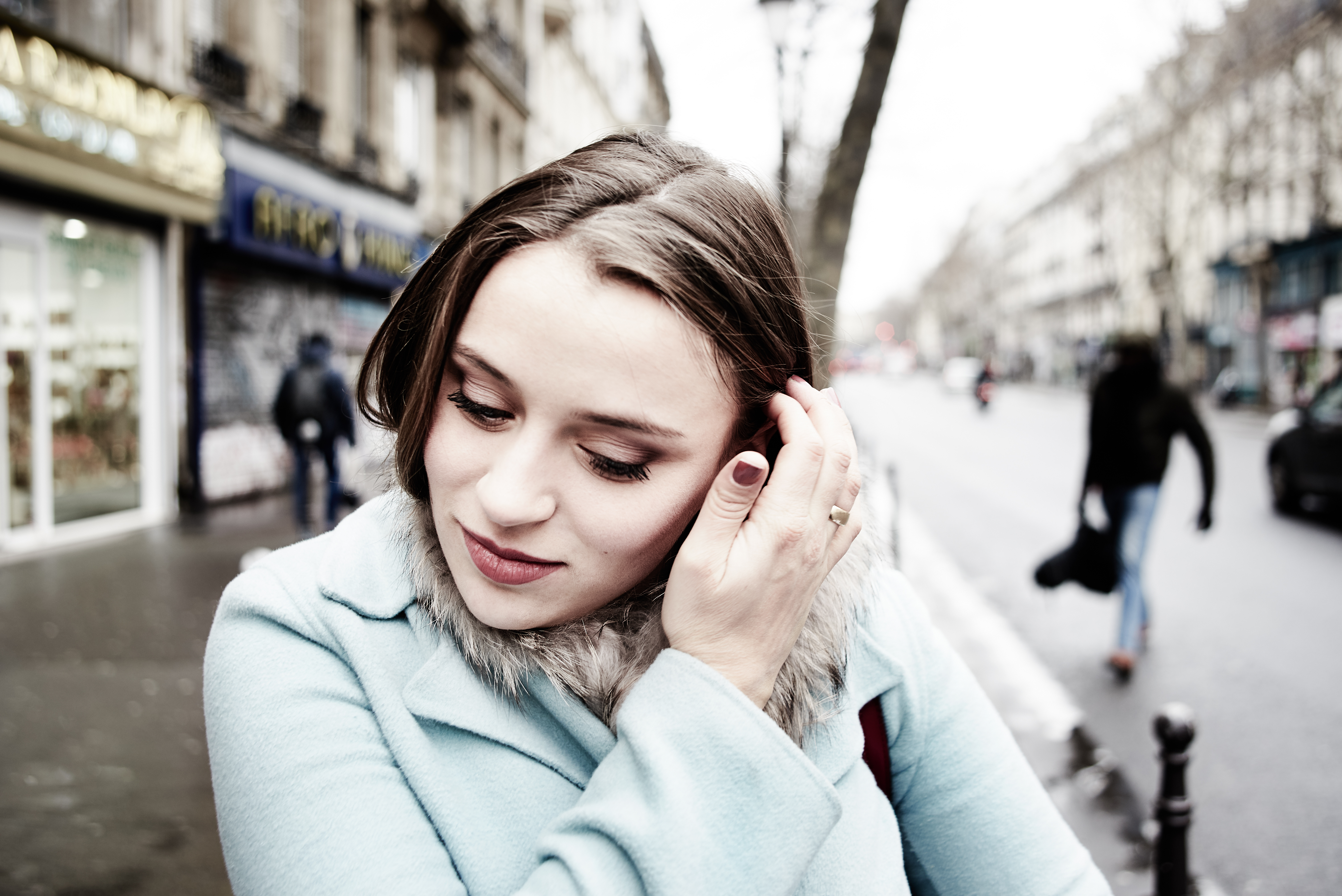
Esther Dierkes

Esther Dierkes (born 9 February 1990) is a German operatic, concert and lied soprano.

== Life and career ==
Born in Münster, Dierkes received her first voice lessons at the age of 13. She achieved first prize in the national competition Jugend musiziert. From 2009 to 2015, she studied opera singing at the Frankfurt University of Music and Performing Arts in Hedwig Fassbender's class.

In the autumn of 2014 Dierkes toured Poland with the Landesjugendorchester of North Rhine-Westphalia, conducted by Hubert Buchberger with concerts in the Filharmonia Wrocławska, the Kraków Philharmonic and in the University of Warsaw. The concert with works by Arnold Schoenberg, Franz Schubert, Alban Berg and Max Reger was broadcast by WDR 3.

Dierkes attended master classes with Gerd Uecker, Rudolf Piernay, Edith Wiens and Helmut Deutsch. She was a member of the opera studio of the Staatstheater Stuttgart from 2015 and became a member of its ensemble with the 2017/18 season, where she appeared as Venus in Offenbach's Orpheus in the Underworld, Zerlina in Mozart's Don Giovanni and in the title role in Dvořák's Rusalka.

She appeared at the Glyndebourne Festival as the First Lady in Mozart's Die Zauberflöte in 2019. She is a regular guest at the Kölner Philharmonie, Berliner Philharmonie, Gewandhaus in Leipzig, and Alte Oper in Frankfurt. She has worked with conductors such as Hartmut Haenchen, Sylvain Cambreling, Risto Joost, Marc Soustrot, Andrew Manze, Ulf Schirmer and Bertrand de Billy.

=== Personal life ===
Dierkes is married to the baritone Björn Bürger

== Scholarships, honours and prizes ==
- 2009: Scholarship of the International Association of Wagner Societies
- 2010: Scholarship of the Cusanuswerk
- 2011: Scholarship of the Da–Ponte–Stiftung
