= Dierker =

Dierker is a surname. Notable people with the surname include:

- Chris Dierker (born 1994), Vietnamese-American basketball player
- Hugh Dierker (1890–1975), American film director and producer
- Larry Dierker (born 1946), American baseball player, manager, and broadcaster

== See also ==
- Dierkes
