= Christopher Lowrey =

American operatic countertenor

- Born: Johnston, Rhode Island, U.S.
- Education: Brown University; University of Cambridge; Royal College of Music
- Occupation: Operatic countertenor
- Website: www.christopherlowrey.com

Christopher Lowrey is an American operatic countertenor who has performed internationally and made many recordings. He took part in the world premiere of Brett Dean's Hamlet at the Glyndebourne Festival in 2017, and moved with the production to places including Australia and the Metropolitan Opera.

== Career ==
Lowrey was born in Johnston, Rhode Island. He liked to sing from childhood and first joined a church choir. He proceeded to sing with other choirs in Rhode Island, and then took vocal training with a local teacher. He studied voice first in the U.S. then in England, completing degrees at Brown University, the University of Cambridge, and the Royal College of Music's international opera school. When he moved to England he looked for a place in choral singing and liked its rich tradition there.

Lowrey took part in the world premiere of Brett Dean's Hamlet at the Glyndebourne Festival in 2017, as Guildenstern, and moved with the production to places including Australia and in 2022 the Metropolitan Opera in New York City, where the production was filmed for an international broadcast.

He appeared at the Oper Frankfurt for the first time in 2023 as Medoro in Handel's Orlando, directed by Ted Huffman and conducted by Simone de Felice, with Zanda Švēde in the title role, Kateryna Kasper as Angelica, and Monika Buczkowska as Dorinda. He was the only guest singer in the cast. Jürgen Kaube from the FAZ noted his sensitive countertenor.

Lowrey has founded vocal ensembles including Ensemble Altera in Providence, the first professional chamber choir in Rhode Island, and ensembles in England including the Cambridge Clerkes, Ensemble Aeterna, and Passio.

== Critical reception ==
=== Faramondo ===
Lowrey received positive reviews for his performance as the villain in the 2015 Brisbane Baroque production of Faramondo. Limelight magazine gave him a "gold star for sheer entertainment" for his portrayal of the King of the Swabians. Critic Clive Paget wrote, "He's a lovely actor, but the voice too is packed with enough character to sink a battleship."

=== Farnace ===
In 2019, Lowrey appeared in the title role in Pinchgut Opera's production of Vivaldi's Farnace at the City Recital Hall in Sydney. A review in Limelight magazine described Lowrey as singing "with spirited, gleaming tones across his register", calling his diction "impeccable" and noting his "powerful stage presence". Critic Jo Litson wrote, "His characterisation exudes impatient arrogance, yet despite Farnace's often odious behaviour, his delivery of Gelido in ogni vena is ravishing and his final reconciliation with Tamiri ... is genuinely poignant".

In his review of Lowrey's performance of an aria from Farnace in San Francisco, critic Steve Winn wrote, "In a voice that wailed upward, plunged straight and alarmingly out of countertenor territory, and raged with siren-like intensity, he gave the character's lament for the 'shadow of my lifeless son' a palpable reality ... The technique was a marvel, and then the listener forgot about it, swept up in the emotional tide."

=== Stabat Mater ===
Lowrey recorded Pergolesi's Stabat Mater with soprano Sandrine Piau and the ensemble Les Talens Lyriques, conducted by Christophe Rousset. A reviewer noted that the singers made a well-balanced pair, performing at high standards.
