= Dierkes =

Dierkes is a surname. Notable people with the surname include:

- Dominic Dierkes (born 1984), American actor, comedian and writer
- Edward Dierkes (1886-1955), American amateur soccer player
- Esther Dierkes (born 1990), German operatic, concert and lied soprano
- John Dierkes (1905-1975), American actor
- Rene Dierkes (born 1991), German politician
