= Bockenheimer Depot =

German former tram depot used as theatre venue

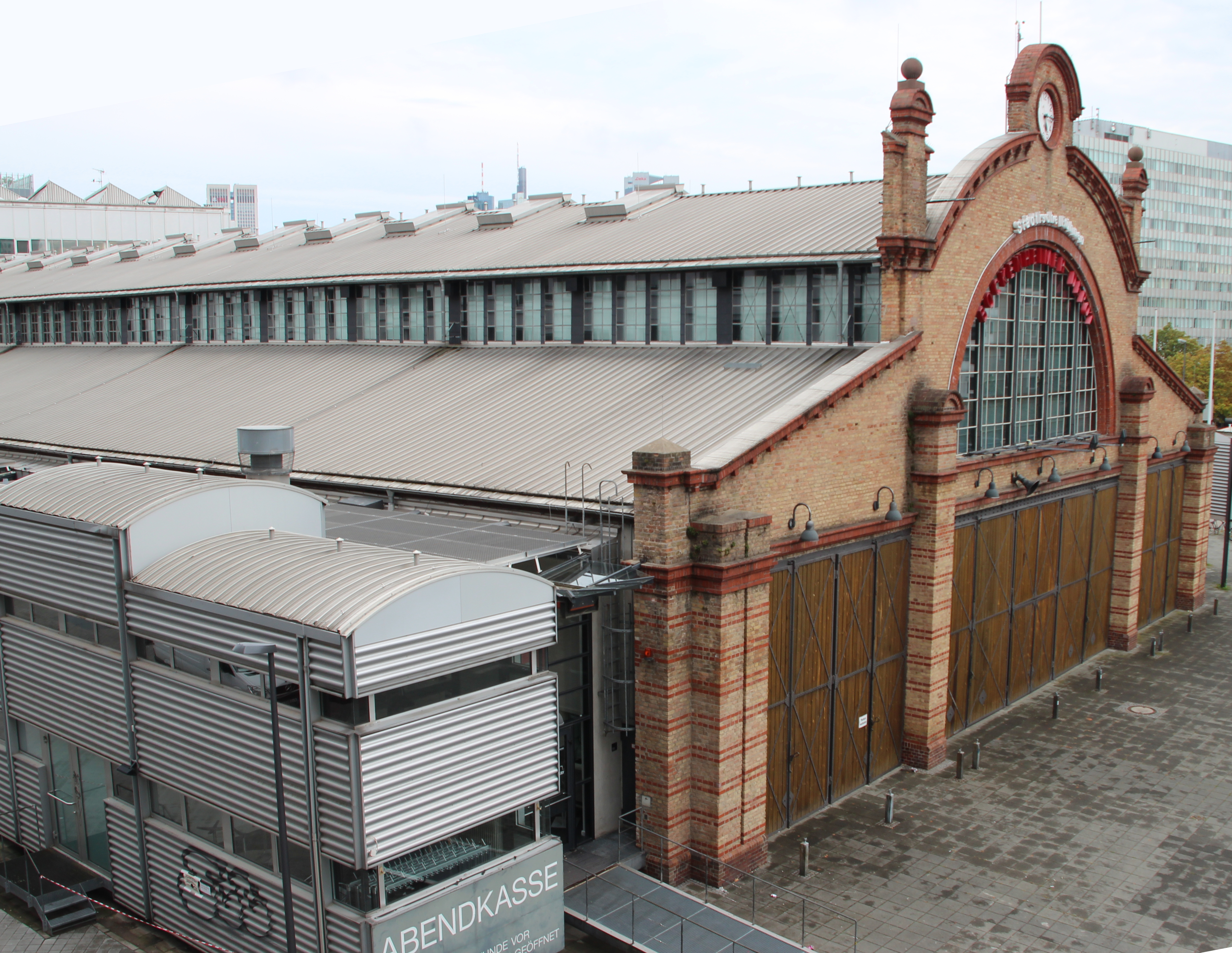
- The former tram depot, now a theatre and cultural venue, in 2015
- Interactive map of Bockenheimer Depot
- Address: Frankfurt, Hesse; Germany
- Coordinates: 50°7′15″N 8°39′6″E
- Owner: Frankfurt
- Capacity: 400
- Type: Theatre, Opera
- Public transit: Bockenheimer Warte; 16 Bockenheimer Warte; 32, 36, 50, N1 Bockenheimer Warte

Construction
- Built: 1900
- Renovated: 1988

The Bockenheimer Depot is a former tram depot and main workshop of the Straßenbahn Frankfurt am Main. It was built around 1900 and is located in the Bockenheim quarter of Frankfurt. A listed monument, it now serves as a theatre venue of the Städtische Bühnen Frankfurt, mostly for Baroque and contemporary opera.

== History ==
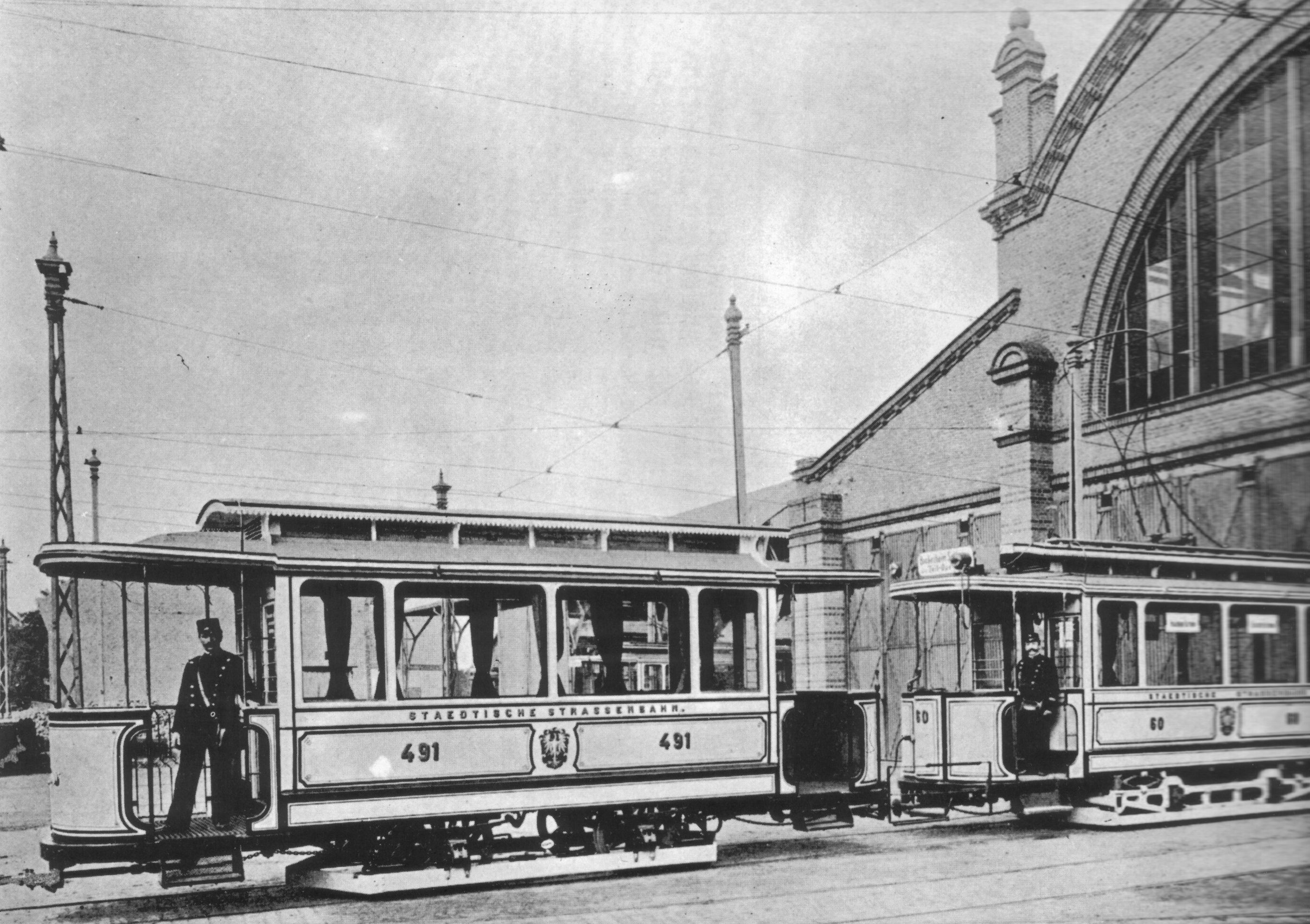
Tram of type A in front of the Depot, c. 1900

Before 1900, a wooden hall existed here for the cars of the horse-drawn trams. Since it was not suitable for the new electric trams, it was demolished in 1900 and replaced by the current building, with an added wooden structure to house the main workshop for the trams (Hauptwerkstatt).

While Frankfurt was badly damaged by the bombing in 1944, the main hall suffered only minor damage. After the war, the hall became too small for the growing traffic. The depot function was discontinued on 6 February 1966, and all facilities were then used for the workshop. In October 1978, a new depot was opened in Praunheim, while the old depot was closed. In 1979, the depot was listed as a historic industrial monument (Industriedenkmal), as one of the first in the Rhein-Main area.

The tram tracks remained until about 1986. All supporting structures were then demolished to make room for parking lots. The hall was occasionally used for events, such as performances of the Circus Roncalli in 1986. When the opera house was damaged by fire in November 1987, the Frankfurt Opera began to use the play theatre, and a new venue was needed for plays. In 1988, the Bockenheimer Depot was rebuilt as a theatre, designed by Klaus Peter Heinrici. An adjacent building was erected as a steel construction, and a square created in front of the historic hall.

When the opera house was reopened in 1991, the depot was mainly used for guest performances. In 1994, an exhibition celebrated the 1200th anniversary of the city, called "FFM 1200/Tradition und Perspektiven einer Stadt" (Frankfurt am Main 1200/Traditions and perspectives of a city). From 1995, the Theater am Turm company performed at the hall until it was dissolved in 2004. Since then, the facility, which belongs to the City of Frankfurt, has been used mostly by Oper Frankfurt, Schauspiel Frankfurt and sometimes the dance theatre Dresden Frankfurt Dance Company (formerly: The Forsythe Company). It can be rented for other events. The opera has used the building mostly for contemporary musical theatre and Baroque operas, including the first performance in Germany of the opera Nacht by Georg Friedrich Haas in 2005, and a production of Monteverdi's L'Orfeo with Christian Gerhaher in the title role in 2008. In 2013, Emilio de Cavalieri's Spiel von Körper und Seele was staged. In 2014, the opera Der goldene Drache by Peter Eötvös received its world premiere. In the 2018/19 season, the German premiere of Olga Neuwirth's Lost Highway was directed by Yuval Sharon, with David Moss, among others.

== Architecture ==
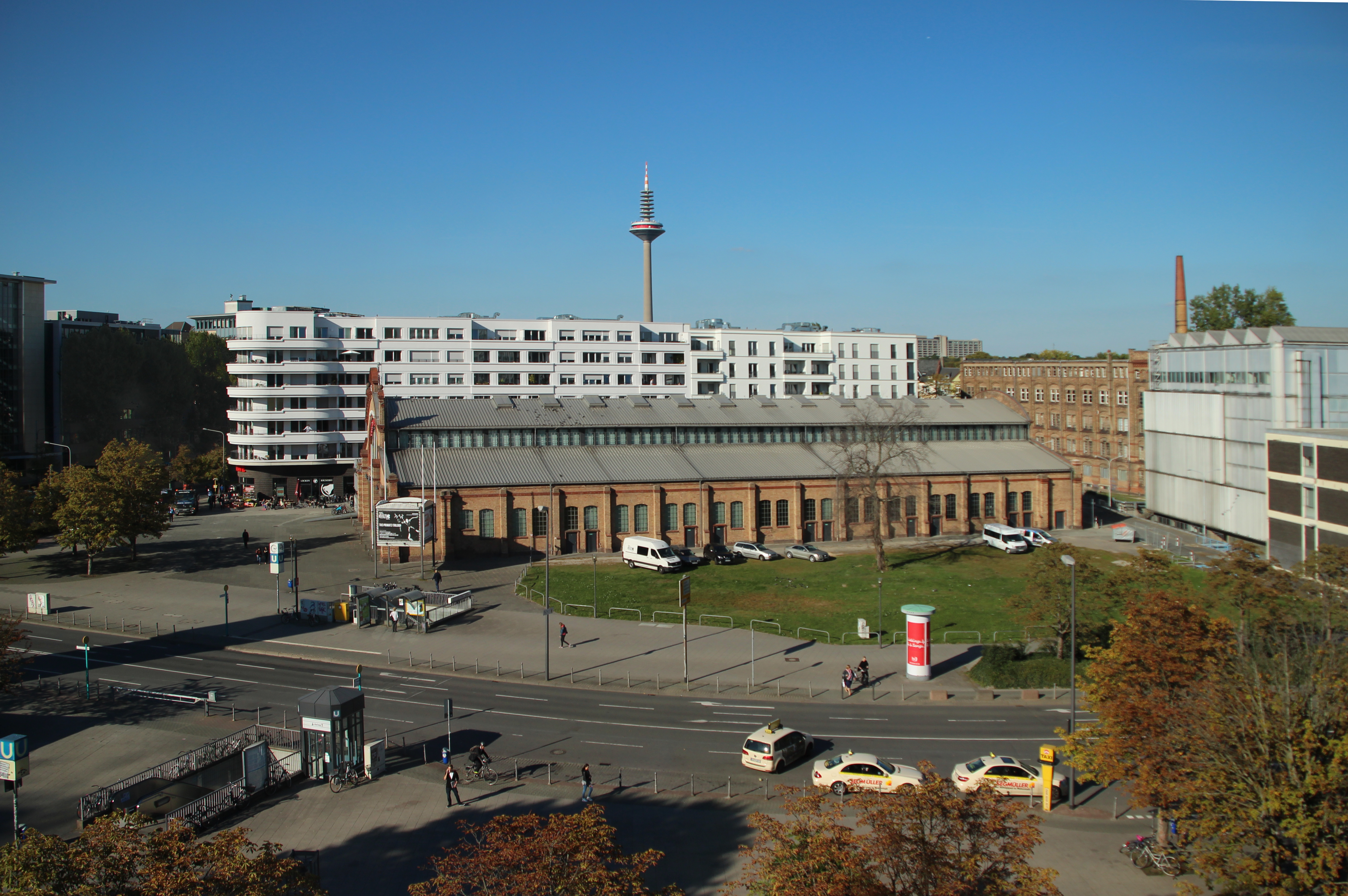
Bockenheimer Depot from the university

The main building of the depot once served as a shed for trams. It was built in 1900 with three naves of yellow bricks with red cornices and decorations. The wooden roof construction goes back to models of the French Renaissance builder Philibert de l'Orme and has become rare. As a theatre venue, the hall now seats around 400 people. The depot is a listed monument according to Hessian law.

== Literature ==
- Dieter Höltge, Günter H. Köhler: Straßen- und Stadtbahnen in Deutschland. 2nd ed. 1: Hessen. EK-Verlag, Freiburg 1992, ISBN 3-88255-335-9, p. 119
- Horst Michelke, Claude Jeanmaire (1972), 100 Jahre Frankfurter Straßenbahnen: 1872–1899–1972 (in German) (1st ed.), Villigen/Switzerland: Verlag Eisenbahn, p. 223, ISBN 3-85649-018-3
