= Hubert Buchberger =

German classical violinist (1951–2025)

Hubert Buchberger (9 September 1951 – 5 June 2025) was a German violinist, conductor and music university teacher who became the teacher at the Frankfurt University of Music and Performing Arts, and in 1985, he became an honorary professor.

== Life and career ==
Buchberger studied from 1970 to 1977, at the Frankfurt University of Music and Performing Arts with Heinz Stanske and Günther Weigmann.

In 1974, he was a founding member of the Buchberger Quartet, as lead violinist. In 1978 and 1979, the quartet was winner of the national selection of Young Artists of the German Music Council, and won international competitions in Portsmouth, Hanover and Évian. From 1974, he headed the Offenbach Chamber Orchestra. He has recorded with the Hessian Youth Symphony Orchestra. In 2004, the Buchberger Quartet recorded Haydn's string quartet, Op. 9. From 2002 to 2008, the Quartet recorded the entire cycle of Haydn's string quartets. The recordings are available as a boxed set on Brilliant Classics.

Buchberger died on 5 June 2025, at the age of 73.
