= Britta Stallmeister =

German operatic soprano

- Born: 1971
- Education: Musikhochschule Hannover
- Occupation: Operatic soprano
- Organizations: Oper Frankfurt
- Awards: Deutscher Musikwettbewerb
- Website: brittastallmeister.com

Britta Stallmeister (born 1971) is a German operatic soprano. A member of the Oper Frankfurt from 1998 to 2015, she has appeared in major European opera houses and international festivals. She has performed in premieres, and in recitals and recordings.

== Career ==
Stallmeister studied voice at the Musikhochschule Hannover with Carl-Heinz Müller.

She was a member of the Oper Frankfurt from 1998, where she made her debut as Pamina in Mozart's Die Zauberflöte. She performed more than 50 roles there, including Hekuba in Les Troyens by Berlioz. After she left the company in 2015, she has still appeared as a guest. Some of the Frankfurt productions were recorded, with her as Woglinde in Wagner's Die Walküre, as Ighino in Pfitzner's Palestrina, and as Cordelia in Aribert Reimann's Lear.

In 2001, she appeared at the Bayreuth Festival as Waldvogel in Wagner's Siegfried and as Blumennädchen in his Parsifal. The following year, she performed at the Salzburg Festival the role of Europa in Die Liebe der Danae by Richard Strauss. On 16 September 2017, she appeared in the premiere of Søren Nils Eichberg's Schönerland at the Hessisches Staatstheater Wiesbaden, in the role of the Stückeschreiberin (librettist). On 31 May 2018, she performed the leading female role of Germa in the first performance of the chamber version of Stephan Peiffer's Vom Ende der Unschuld at the Wiebaden Schlachthof as part of the Internationale Maifestspiele.

She recorded the role of Ilia in Mozart's Idomeneo in the arrangement by Richard Strauss, alongside Robert Gambill in the title role, Iris Vermillion as Idamante and Camilla Nylund as Ismene, conducted by Fabio Luisi, in 2008.

In concert, she appeared in recitals and recorded songs by Hans Pfitzner, among others. In 2000, she recorded the soprano part in Bach's St Matthew Passion with the EuropaChorAkademie, conducted by Joshard Daus, alongside Andreas Wagner as the Evangelist, Friedemann Kunder as the vox Christi, and contralto Hedwig Fassbender.

In 1997, she won a prize at the Deutscher Musikwettbewerb.
