= Der goldene Drache =

- Opera by Péter Eötvös
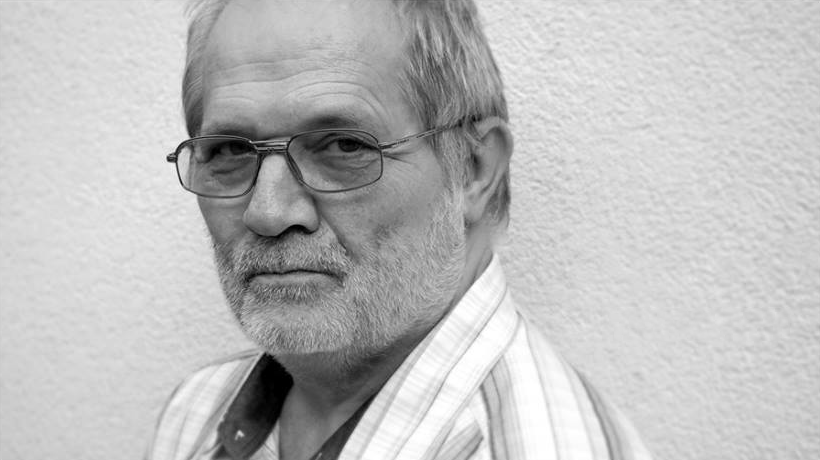
- The composer in 2011
- Librettist: Roland Schimmelpfennig
- Language: German
- Based on: Schimmelpfennig's play of the same name
- Premiere: 29 June 2014; Bockenheimer Depot, by Oper Frankfurt

Der goldene Drache (The Golden Dragon) is an opera by Hungarian composer Péter Eötvös to a libretto by Roland Schimmelpfennig, based on his play of the same name. It premiered on 29 June 2014 at the Bockenheimer Depot in Frankfurt, conducted by the composer.

== History ==
Eötvös composed the opera in 2013/14 on a commission by ensemble modern and the Oper Frankfurt, his ninth opera. He had written operas on literary plots before, beginning with his first in 1998, Tri sestry (Three Sisters) after Anton Chekhov's play. The German libretto by Schimmelpfennig is based on his play of the same name. The play had premiered five years earlier at the Akademietheater in Vienna, staged by the author, and was awarded the Mülheimer Dramatikerpreis of 2010. Schimmelpfenig and Eötvös chose 21 short scenes from the play's 48 "disparate snapshots". The opera premiered on 29 June 2014 in Frankfurt's Bockenheimer Depot, conducted by the composer. It was staged by Elisabeth Stöppler, with stage design by Hermann Feuchter and costumes by Nicole Pleuler. The composer revised the opera in 2015. The Frankfurt production was then shown at the Bregenz Festival in August 2015. The UK premiere was toured by Music Theatre Wales in 2017, during which time it was banned from the stage of the Hackney Empire for alleged "yellowface" racism.

== Roles ==
The five singers required for a performance all perform several of the 18 roles, switching gender, age and culture. Their voices are amplified. The duration is given as 1 1/2 hours.

Roles	Voice type	Premiere cast, 29 June 2014 Conductor: Péter Eötvös
Young woman / The little Chinese	soprano	Kateryna Kasper
Woman over 60 / Old cook / granddaughter / Ant / Hans / Chinese mother	mezzo-soprano	Hedwig Fassbender
Young man / young Asian / waitress / grandfather / Cricket / Chinese aunt	tenor	Simon Bode
Man over 60 / old Asian / Eve (dark-brown stewardess) / granddaughter's friend / Chinese father	tenor	Hans-Jürgen Lazar
Man / Asian / Inga (the blonde stewardess) / Chinese uncle	baritone	Holger Falk

== Plot and music ==
The story begins in a Chinese restaurant, where a cook, the Little Chinese, suffers from toothache. As an illegal immigrant, he avoids seeing a dentist. When the tooth is extracted unprofessionally in the kitchen, he bleeds to death. A stewardess finds the tooth in her bowl of soup and takes it on a trip to China.

The story is both tragic and comic, absurd, grotesque and enigmatic. The music adds even more dimensions, revealing connections and psychological aspects. It uses parlando style for many scenes, but reserves a final monologue of farewell to the Little Chinese.

== Instrumentation ==
The instrumentation calls for:

- woodwinds: flute (also alto flute and piccolo), oboe (also Cor anglais), clarinet, bass clarinet, bassoon (also contrabassoon)
- brass: horn, 2 trumpets, trombone
- percussion: many, and kitchen sounds
- keyboard (digital hammond and piano)
- strings (1 · 0 · 1 · 1 · 1, or 6 · 0 · 4 · 3 · 1)
