= Corinna von Rad =

German-American theatre director

Corinna von Rad (born 1971) is a German-American opera and theatre director.

== Biography ==
Von Rad was born in 1971 in New York City. She descends from a patrician family. She studied musical theatre directing at the Hochschule für Musik und Theater Hamburg, studying under Götz Friedrich. She graduated in 1995.

Von Rad worked for two years as an assistant director and director for opera at the Staatstheater Braunschweig. She worked with Christoph Marthaler as an assistant and director at the Salzburg Festival, the Paris Opera, the Volksbühne, and the Burgtheater.

Since 1999 she has worked as a freelance opera and theatre director at the Munich Kammerspiele, the Schauspiel Frankfurt, the Meiningen Court Theatre, the Theater am Neumarkt, the Theater Freiburg, the Theater Aachen, the Cuvilliés Theatre, the Deutsches Nationaltheater and Staatskapelle Weimar, the Staatstheater Augsburg, and the Berlin State Opera. She has also staged productions at the Schauspielhaus Zürich and Theater Basel.

She became a visiting professor at the Frankfurt University of Music and Performing Arts in 2006, teaching theatre directing, acting, and dramaturgy. She has also taught at the Berlin University of the Arts. In 2009 she became a visiting professor of musical theatre directing at the Hochschule für Musik "Hanns Eisler".
