= Herbert Hess =

German operatic tenor (1908–1977)

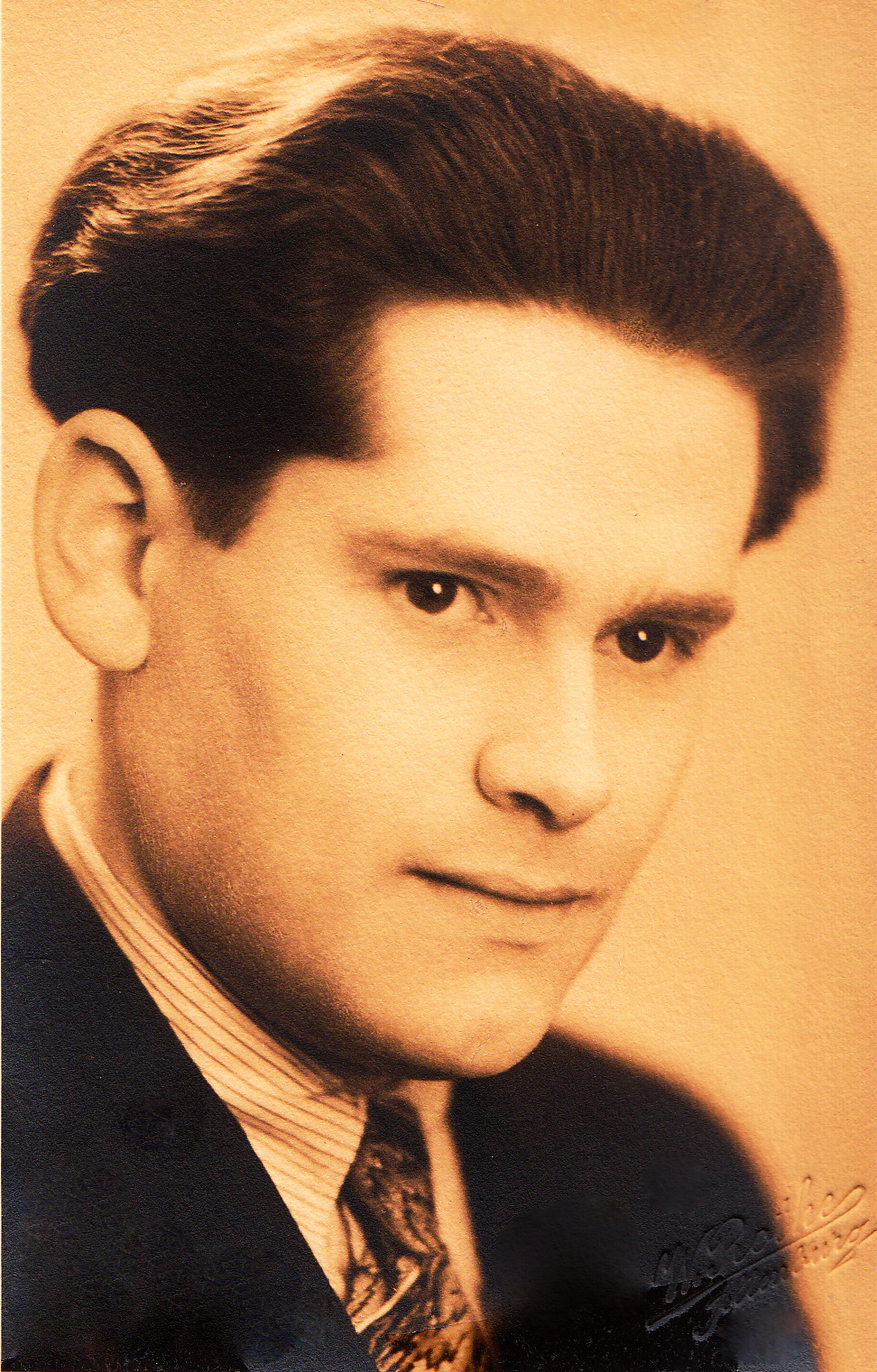
Herbert Hess, about 1932

Herbert Hess (16 June 1908 in Frankfurt, German Empire – 31 October 1977) was a German classical singer, an operatic tenor and a university professor. He performed in operas, operettas and later focussed on sacred music. His debut in the UK took place in 1954.

== Family ==
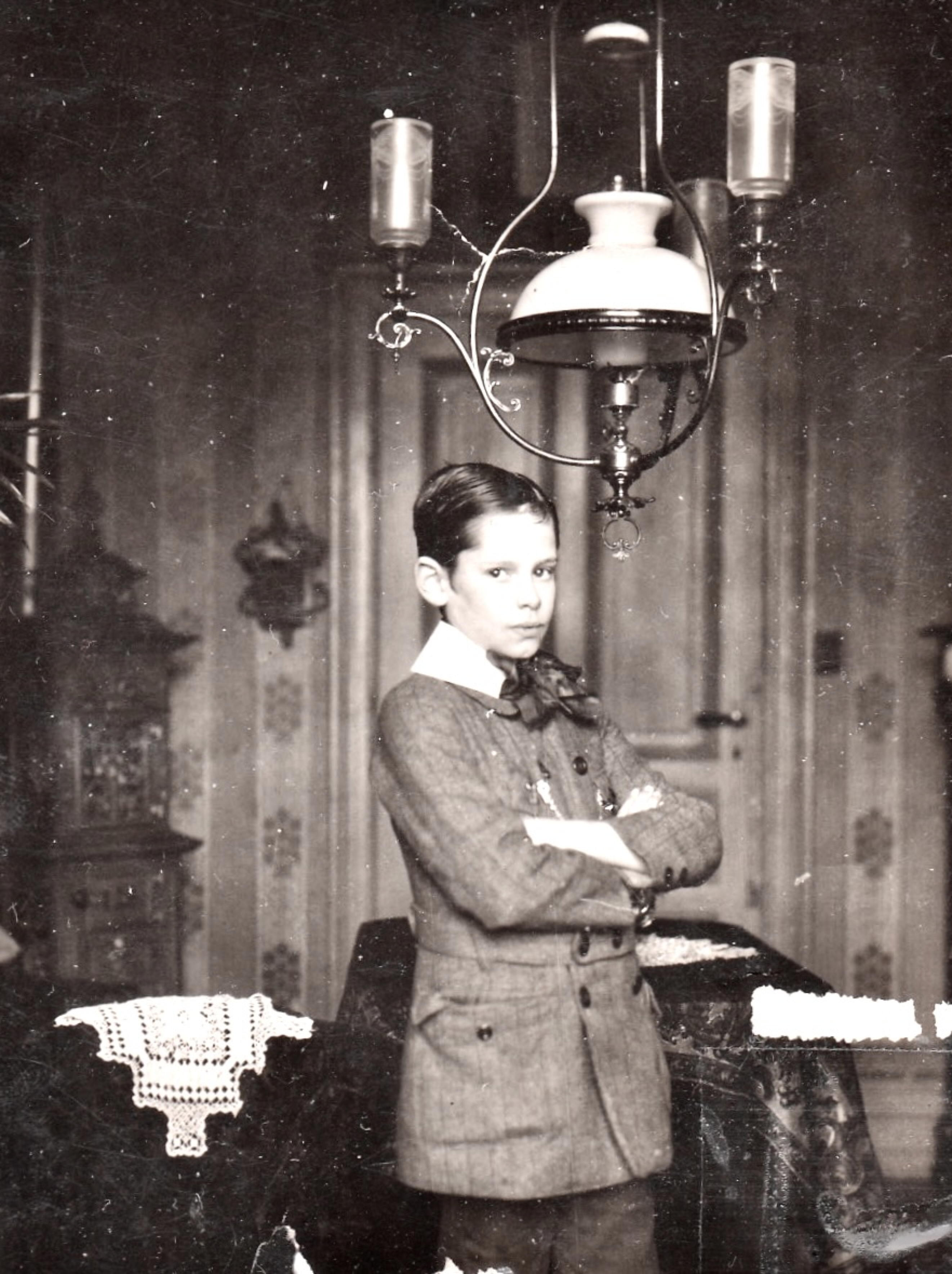
Herbert Hess, about 1920

He was the fourth-born of five children of the German-Jewish merchant Leopold Hess (16 December 1863 in Frankfurt – 1 November 1918) and his Christian wife Eugenie (2 August 1870 – 2 January 1930), née Wolf. Herbert had three older siblings, Mathilde (1 August 1894 in Frankfurt – 5 February 1957), Alfred (* ? in Frankfurt; † 1970 as Alfredo Hess Wolf in Barcelona, Catalonia, Spain), Richard (10 October 1896 in Frankfurt – 10 August 1918 near Fransart, department Somme, France), and a younger brother, Helmut (3 June 1910 in Frankfurt – 30 January 1972 in Mainz, Rhineland-Palatinate).

Herbert's youth had been significantly influenced by World War I as well as the economic shortage of the post-war years, hyperinflation and Great Depression.

A first hard turning point was the death of his older brother Richard, who during the last weeks of the war was shot on guard in France near Fouquescourt at the age of 21 by a British sharpshooter. Shortly after, the family's father also died early at the age of 54.

After elementary school, Hess attended Klinger School in Frankfurt's borough Nordend.

The family's only daughter, Mathilde, received her philosophical doctorate in 1924. She later contributed significantly to the preservation and well-being of the family. She served as a secondary teacher for German, French and Protestant religion at Frankfurt's Herder School for girls in Frankfurt's borough Ostend.

The youngest son Helmut was severely disabled due to polio and for decades ultimately dependent on a wheelchair.

Herbert received his singing and piano training at the Hoch Conservatory in the era of Bernhard Sekles.

== Career ==
=== 1930–1945 ===
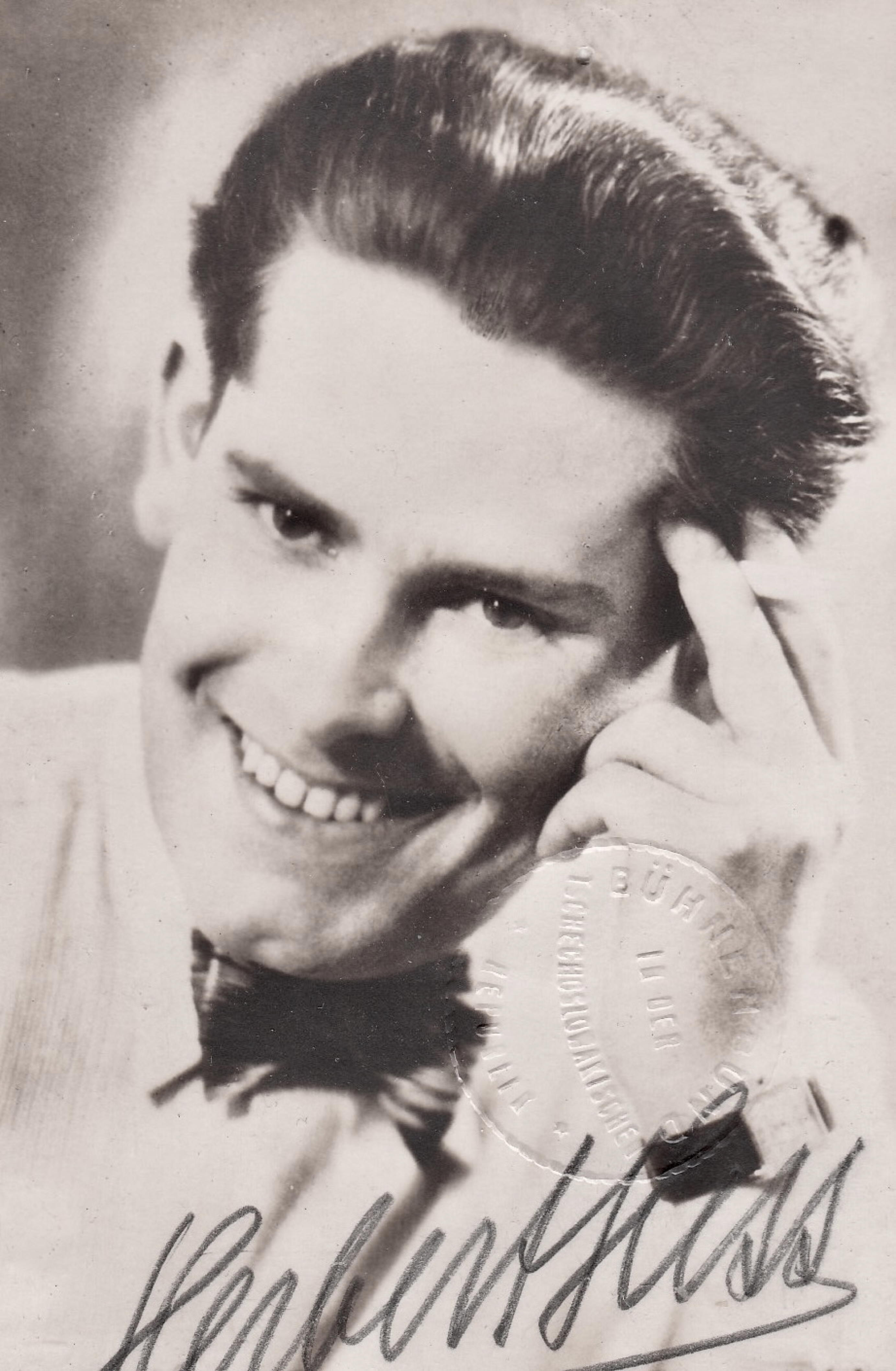
One version of Herbert Hess's artists picture postcards with handwritten autograph, about 1936

Until about the mid-1930s Herbert Hess was engaged at German theatres; engagements in Kolberg in 1932 and Gotha in 1933 are documented, for example. He met the contralto Marie Maurer (* 23 June 1907 in Münzenberg; † 30 July 1971 in Frankfurt), both married. At the time of his engagement in Gotha, Marie and Herbert Hess's only child, Kurt Herbert "Herbie" (1933–2015), was born.

Third Reich had a direct impact on the family; Nazi authorities issued professional bans, first in 1933 for Herbert Hess's older sister, Mathilde, the teacher in public service. This way she also lost all rights to pension and insurance.

As a result, the children of the family suddenly became aware of the Jewish roots of their late father Leopold, as family life was affected by Christianity, here Lutheran.

Herbert Hess sympathized with the opposition movement Confessing Church, particularly with the views of Dietrich Bonhoeffer, Helmut Gollwitzer and Martin Niemöller.

From around 1935/36, Hess was no longer allowed to appear on German stages, and in 1935 he was excluded from the Reich Theater Chamber, a subdivision of Reich Chamber of Culture. Therefore, he initially switched to the second largest theater of Czechoslovakia, to Teplice, under the aegis of Carl Richter (1870–1943).

However, due to Munich Agreement German Wehrmacht at the beginning of October 1938 invaded Sudetenland, so the option to perform on stage in Teplice was also taken away from him.

The Nazis fundamentally destroyed Herbert Hess's early operatic career as a classical tenor by discriminating and classifying him as a Half-Jew (with two Jewish grandparents on his father's side), since the professional ban lasted for a singer's normally essential creative years.

During WWII he was not drafted into the fighting troops, but still required to serve. In Erfurt he received an artillery training until Wehrmacht became aware of his status as a Half-Jew. Therefore, he got dismissed from service. Hess found this humiliating and defamatory.

While the war continued, Herbert Hess worked as a representative for fine leather goods to secure his and his family's livelihood. In the last phase of the war, he was called up as an industrial worker in Butzbach.

=== 1945–1973 ===
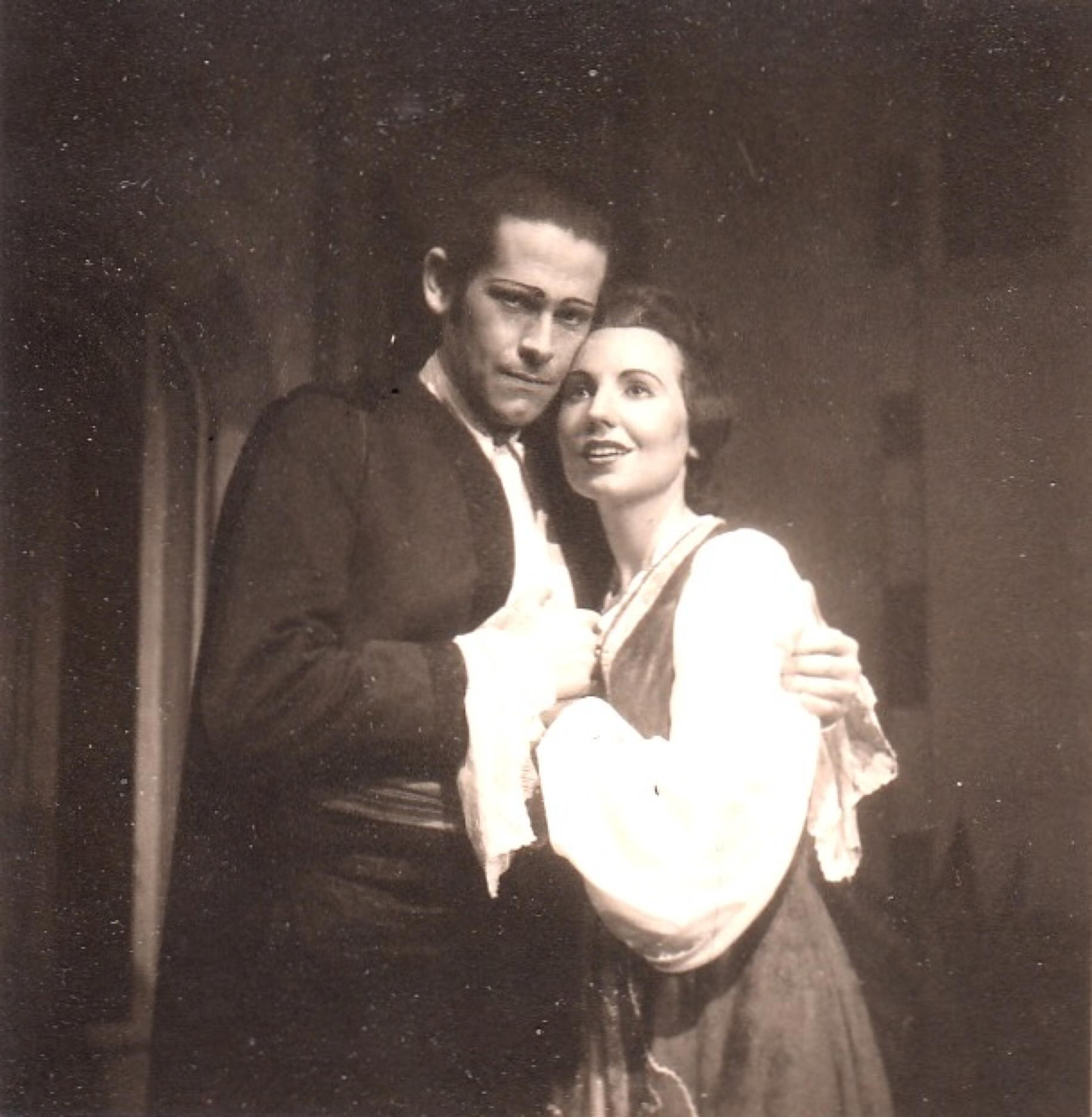
Die Entführung aus dem Serail by Wolfgang Amadeus Mozart, Stadttheater (City Theatre) Koblenz, 1946

In 1946, Hess was offered a contract by Südwestfunk (SWF) to appear as a vocal interpreter for the radio station and to take part in archive productions. During this phase, there was a tour around the Mediterranean, which was completed by cruise ship.

At the end of the 1940s he took part in recordings for Radio Frankfurt (later: Hessischer Rundfunk).

At the beginning of the 1950s, for example, he appeared for the Bonn Bach Community in the Christmas Oratorio and St John Passion under the direction of Gustav Classens.

Finally, he was very successful under the aegis of Kurt Thomas with the Frankfurt Dreikönigs-Kantorei (later: Frankfurter Kantorei) in and abroad in concerts, a large number of recordings with Hess were made in the 1950s. He developed an intense inner connection to concert church music.

Christmas Story by Heinrich Schütz: The narrative, already allotted to a tenor, is beautifully declaimed by Herbert Hess and the other solists sing well. (...) St. John Passion: Here Herbert Hess's contribution is of quite outstanding excellence. It is a pleasure to hear the narrative sung as though by a story-teller who is excited and moved by what he has to tell, and not in the slow, hieratic manner so often adopted in English performances.

— Dyneley Hussey, The Musical Times, May 1954

Hess worked artistically alongside Kurt Thomas and many others like Heinrich Bensing, Helene Bindhardt, Maud Cunitz, Hans Dahmen, Diana Eustrati, Betina Feit-Brucker, Karl Friedrich, Rudolf Gonszar, Willy Hofmann, Aga Joesten, Karl Kronenberg, Gisela Litz, Jean Löhe, Christa Ludwig, Maria Madlen Madsen, Arnold van Mill, Olga Moll, Aage Poulsen, Heinz Prybit, Otto von Rohr, Helge Rosvaenge, Heinrich Schlusnus, Paul Schmitz, Erik Schumann, Frithjof Sentpaul, Georg Stern, Else Tegetthoff, Günther Treptow, Elfride Trötschel and Helmut Walcha. He admired the artistic performances of Schlusnus and Walcha as well as those of Joseph Schmidt and Fritz Wunderlich.

Hess went on musical tours to France, Italy and Spain.

After completing his active time as a tenor, Herbert Hess taught as a vocal training lecturer until his retirement at Frankfurt University of Music and Performing Arts under the aegis of Philipp Mohler (1908–1982) and at University of Mainz, later as a professor.

A collegial friendship connected him with the lecturer for vocal training at Hoch Conservatory, Herbert Champain (actually: Herbert Czempin, born on 31 March 1907 in Frankfurt; deceased on 14 March 1992) and the professor for piano, music theory and organ music, Wilhelm Baither (a scholar of Helmut Walcha), from the University of Music and Performing Arts Frankfurt am Main. Through Champain he met his wife Charlotte Landé (1890–1977).

=== 1973–1977 ===
In 1973 Herbert Hess became emeritus. He had great respect for contemporaries like German actor Hans Söhnker because of their humane attitude during the Nazi dictatorship. He was familiar with the Hessian secretary of state Heinz-Herbert Karry (1920–1981) as they lived just two houses away from each other.

His hobbies were philately and photography, which he had practiced since his youth. Since the end of the 1950s he had been active in slide photography with his Leica M2 rangefinder camera.

He died unexpectedly of heart failure in the early morning of October 31, 1977, and was buried in the family grave in Frankfurt's Main cemetery.

== Literature ==
- Frithjof Trapp, Bärbel Schrader, Dieter Wenk, Ingrid Maass: Biographisches Lexikon der Theaterkünstler, Vol. 2. Walter de Gruyter, Munich 2013. ISBN 978-3-1109-5969-7, p. 412.
- Werner Schuder: Kürschners Deutscher Gelehrten-Kalender, Walter de Gruyter, Munich 2019. ISBN 978-3-1115-7447-9, p. 2971.
