= Hamlet (Dean) =

Opera by Brett Dean

- Opera by Brett Dean
- Librettist: Matthew Jocelyn
- Language: English
- Based on: Hamlet by Shakespeare
- Premiere: June 11, 2017; Glyndebourne Festival

Hamlet is an opera in two acts by Australian composer Brett Dean, with an English libretto by Matthew Jocelyn, which is based on Shakespeare's play of the same name. The libretto uses "as little as 20 per cent" of the play's text and also takes inspiration from the "first quarto" as it "offers a different view on certain moments".

The opera premiered at Glyndebourne Festival on 11 June 2017, directed by Neil Armfield and conducted by Vladimir Jurowski. A month later on 6 July, the production was live streamed on Glyndebourne's website free of charge. The production was then presented in 2018 at the Adelaide Festival with Clayton, Gilfry, and Begley from the Glyndebourne cast and Cheryl Barker as Gertrude. The Metropolitan Opera in New York City mounted the Glyndebourne production in May 2022 with several of the original cast members, conducted by Australian conductor Nicholas Carter in his Met debut. The production was also seen at the Bavarian State Opera in Munich in the summer of 2023 as part of the Munich Opera Festival. Several singers from the premiere were heard in Munich. The performances were a great success with the audience.

== Roles ==
Roles, voice types, premiere cast
Role	Voice type	Premiere cast, 11 June 2017 Conductor: Vladimir Jurowski
Hamlet	lyric dramatic tenor	Allan Clayton
Ophelia	dramatic coloratura soprano	Barbara Hannigan
Claudius	dramatic bass-baritone	Rod Gilfry
Gertrude	lyric mezzo-soprano	Sarah Connolly
Polonius	character tenor	Kim Begley
Horatio	lyric baritone	Jacques Imbrailo
Ghost / Gravedigger / Fourth player	dramatic low bass	John Tomlinson
Laertes	tenor	David Butt Philip
Rosencrantz and Guildenstern	countertenors	Rupert Enticknap, Christopher Lowrey
Marcellus / Third player	baritone	James Newby
First player	tenor	John Findon
Second player	tenor	Anthony Osbourne

Additional roles include an on-stage accordionist (premiere cast: James Crabb). The work is written for large on-stage chorus, as well as an eight-strong 'semi-chorus' in the pit.

== Reception ==
Erica Jeal, writing for The Guardian in 2017, gave a generally favourable review: "Dean's music is many-layered, full of long, clear vocal lines propelled by repeated rhythmic figures in the orchestra, and has moments of delicate beauty ... and the chorus whispers almost as much as it sings." Rupert Christiansen in The Telegraph noted that the performance appeared to be a hit with the audience—"The first-night audience for Brett Dean's new opera roared its approval so vociferously that I feel almost shame-faced to confess to any reservations about its success"—and complimented it on Dean's music, the actors' vocal performances, and the sound design. However, he was ultimately left cold, saying that "the drama holds attention, but lacks heart and soul" and concluding that "I was far more emotionally engaged by Franco Faccio's romantically overheated Amleto of 1865 ... than I was by this clean, lean and unambiguous vision of a tragedy that should plumb the darkness of moral life. Cara Chanteau in The Independent was also generally favourable but expressed a reservation that "for all the intricate care applied to the instrumentation (fruit of Dean's decade playing viola in the Berlin Philharmonic), the major motor of the piece remains the wordy libretto rather than any developing musical argument." Zachary Woolfe in The New York Times considered it "an adaptation about 'Hamlet' as much as it is an adaptation of 'Hamlet'." Richard Morrison in The Times summed it up as: "Forget Cumberbatch. Forget even Gielgud. I haven't seen a more physically vivid, emotionally affecting or psychologically astute portrayal of the Prince of Denmark than Allan Clayton gives in this sensational production."

In 2019, writers of The Guardian ranked Hamlet the 18th greatest work of art music since 2000, with Fiona Maddocks describing it as an "ingenious reworking of Shakespeare".
