= Martin Gründler =

German music educator

Martin Gründler (4 December 1918 in Oberroßbach – 20 October 2004) was a German voice teacher and university lecturer.

== Life and career ==
From 1957, Gründler was professor of opera singing at the Frankfurt University of Music and Performing Arts. Information about his students can be found in Karl-Josef Kutsch's and Leo Riemens' Großes Sängerlexikon.

Gründler was awarded honorary senator dignity at his university in 2003.
