= Hedwig Fassbender =

German opera mezzo-soprano (born 1954)

- Born: 23 October 1954 (age 70); Iversheim, Germany
- Education: Musikhochschule Köln
- Occupations: Operatic mezzo-soprano; Academic
- Organizations: Frankfurt University of Music and Performing Arts
- Website: www.hedwig-fassbender.de

Hedwig Fassbender (born 23 October 1954) is a German operatic mezzo-soprano and academic voice teacher. She has appeared in leading roles at major European opera houses, including some soprano roles such as Wagner's Isolde and Sieglinde.

== Career ==
Born in Iversheim, Fassbender first studied piano and music pedagogy at the Musikhochschule Köln, and then began to study voice with Ernst Haefliger in Munich. During her studies, she received prizes at the Hugo Wolf Competition in Vienna and the Mozartfest Competition of the Musikhochschule Würzburg. She became a member of the Theater Freiburg, then of Theater Basel, where she worked for five years. Her roles there included trousers roles such as Cherubino in Mozart's Le nozze di Figaro, Idamante in his Idomeneo, and Nicklausse in Offenbach's Les contes d'Hoffmann.

She has worked freelance since 1987, appearing as a guest in Barcelona, Vienna, Hamburg, and Berlin, among others. She turned to dramatic roles, such as Bizet's Carmen and Fricka im Wagner's Der Ring des Nibelungen. In 1989, she appeared at the Dutch National Opera in Amsterdam as Marguerite in La damnation de Faust by Berlioz. In 1997, she was Judith in Bartók's Bluebeard's Castle at the Opéra national du Rhin in Strasbourg. She performed the role of Anja Larsson in the premiere of Philippe Manoury's 60e Parallèle at the Théâtre du Châtelet in Paris on 3 March 1997.

In 2001, she appeared in the soprano role of Isolde in Wagner's Tristan und Isolde at the Theater Saarbrücken. Further soprano roles have included Marie in Berg's Wozzeck, the Foreign princess in Dvořák's Rusalka, the Marschallin in Der Rosenkavalier by Richard Strauss, and Ariane in Ariane et Barbe-bleue by Paul Dukas. She was nominated for Singer of the Year for her Sieglinde in Wagner's Die Walküre in Liège. More recent roles have included Herodias in Salome by Richard Strauss, and the Kostelnicka in Janáček's Jenůfa. At the Oper Frankfurt, she appeared as Babuschka in Prokofieff's Der Spieler, and Gertrud in Humperdick's Hänsel und Gretel, among others. She appeared there also in the premiere of Der goldene Drache by Peter Eötvös in 2014, performing six roles.

In 1998, Fassbender recorded the alto part in J. S. Bach's Mass in B minor with the EuropaChorAkademie, conducted by Joshard Daus. In 2000, she recorded with the same choir the alto part in Bach's St Matthew Passion, alongside Andreas Wagner as the Evangelist, Friedemann Kunder as the vox Christi, and soprano Britta Stallmeister. She recorded the role of Isolde in 2005, conducted by Leif Segerstam.

Fassbender was professor of voice at the Hochschule für Musik und Darstellende Kunst in Frankfurt from 1999 to 2017. There, she was Ausbildungsdirektorin, director of the voice department, from 2001 to 2011, and dean of the acting department from 2008 to 2011. When the university received the award Hessischer Exzellenzpreis für Hochschullehre (Hessian Prize for Excellence in Academic Teaching) in 2011, the award was also credited to her work. She has regularly trained singers at the Opernstudio Zürich (IOS) from 2015, and at the opera studios of the Paris Opera and the Bolshoi Theatre. Her students have included Anne Bierwirth, Björn Bürger, Kateryna Kasper, Katharina Magiera, and Esther Dierkes.
