= Heinz Stanske =

German classical violinist

Heinz Stanske (2 December 1909 – 1996) was a German violinist and music pedagogue.

== Life and career ==
Born in Berlin, Stanske studied in his hometown and Milan. He started his career as a violin soloist in 1938.

From 1944 to 1955, he led a master class at the Hochschule für Kirchenmusik Heidelberg. From 1955 he taught at the Hochschule für Musik Karlsruhe, from 1959 at the Frankfurt University of Music and Performing Arts. In 1962, he was appointed Professor there.

Since 1950, Stanske was a special concertmaster of the Südwestfunk orchestra in Baden-Baden.

Edith Peinemann was one of his students.

== Sources ==
- Wilibald Gurlitt, Carl Dahlhaus, ed. (1961) [1882], Riemann Musik-Lexikon. In drei Bänden und zwei Ergänzungsbänden.: Stanske, Heinz (in German), vol. 2. Personenteil L–Z (12. völlig neubearbeitete Auflage ed.), Mainz: B. Schotts-Söhne, p. 718
- Wilibald Gurlitt, Carl Dahlhaus, ed. (1975) [1882], Riemann Musik-Lexikon. In drei Bänden und zwei Ergänzungsbänden.: Stanske, Heinz (in German), vol. 5. Personenteil L–Z (12. völlig neubearbeitete Auflage ed.), Mainz: B. Schotts-Söhne, p. 697
