= Brian Mulligan =

American operatic baritone

Brian Mulligan is an American operatic baritone who has performed in major opera houses and concert halls all over the world.

Mulligan's diverse repertoire currently includes over 60 roles in seven languages. He regularly performs the standard works of Puccini, Verdi, and Wagner, yet also sings the music of living composers such as John Adams, Dominick Argento, and Gregory Spears.

In September 2018, The Washington Post wrote "Mulligan is a big man with a big voice. His baritone is almost embarrassingly rich in its low and middle registers, with a high range and head voice of bell-like purity. His diction is flawless. Most importantly, he imbues every syllable with unmistakable meaning and purpose."

== Early life and education ==
Born in Endicott, New York, Mulligan has two younger brothers and was raised in an Irish Catholic home. His parents were born in Ireland, which allowed Mulligan to be granted dual citizenship with the United States and Ireland.

Mulligan studied voice at the Juilliard School and Yale University. His primary voice teachers were Dale Moore, Beverley Peck Johnson, and W. Stephen Smith, with whom he still studies today.

Mulligan spent five summers as a student at the Aspen Music Festival and School, two summers as a Young Artist with Wolf Trap Opera and one summer with the Steans Institute at the Ravinia Festival.

== Career ==
Brian Mulligan made his professional debut at the Metropolitan Opera in December 2003. He was still a student at Juilliard at the time of his debut, singing the role of Der Wächter in Die Frau ohne Schatten. Since then, he has gone on to perform at some of the most important opera houses in the world, including the Wiener Staatsoper (debut as Balstrode in Peter Grimes), San Francisco Opera (debut as Marcello in La bohème), Opernhaus Zürich (debut as Yeletsky in Pique Dame), Lyric Opera of Chicago (debut as Enrico in Lucia di Lammermoor), Oper Frankfurt (debut as Prospero in Adès' The Tempest), Los Angeles Opera (debut as Prometheus in Die Vögel), New York City Opera (debut as Jake Wallace in La fanciulla del West) and Houston Grand Opera (debut as Marcello in La bohème).

Recent appearance include Mandryka in Arabella with San Francisco Opera, Golaud in Pelléas et Mélisande at Oper Frankfurt, Sharpless in Madama Butterfly with Opernhaus Zürich, Gunther in Götterdämmerung and Donner in Das Rheingold with San Francisco Opera, Paolo Albiani in Simon Boccanegra at the Metropolitan Opera, Amonasro in Aida at the Aspen Music Festival, John Proctor in The Crucible at the Glimmerglass Festival, Nelusko in L'Africaine at Oper Frankfurt, Tadeusz in The Passenger at the Theater an der Wien and Roderick Usher in Debussy's La chute de la maison Usher at San Francisco Opera.

Mulligan has garnered much critical acclaim in his career, particularly for his performances of Sweeney Todd and Richard Nixon in Nixon in China, both with San Francisco Opera, Enrico in the David Alden production of Lucia di Lammermoor at Canadian Opera Company, English National Opera, and Washington National Opera, the title role of Hamlet at Minnesota Opera and Valentin in Faust at the Metropolitan Opera, Opernhaus Zürich, and San Francisco Opera.

Other roles include Di Luna in Il trovatore at Oper Frankfurt, Renato in Un ballo in maschera and Chorebe in Les Troyens both at San Francisco Opera, Thérèse at Wexford Festival Opera, Hansel and Gretel at Lyric Opera of Chicago, Carmina Burana with the Cleveland Orchestra and Peter Grimes at the Aspen Music Festival. Mulligan has also appeared at the Ravinia Festival, Spoleto Festival USA and the Saito Kinen Festival in Japan.

Brian Mulligan has performed with many of the finest orchestras in America, including the Cleveland Orchestra (A Sea Symphony), the San Francisco Symphony Orchestra (Das klagende Lied), the Chicago Symphony Orchestra (Songs for Adam), the Houston Symphony (Paulus) and the Los Angeles Philharmonic (Mahler Symphony #8).

== The Shining (opera) ==
In May 2016, Brian Mulligan created the role of Jack Torrance in the world premiere of The Shining by Paul Moravec at Minnesota Opera. The entire run of the production was sold out and the opera was proclaimed "a chilling, artistic triumph" by Musical America. The reviews for Mulligan's portrayal of Jack Torrance were raves. Opera News wrote, "As Jack Torrance, Brian Mulligan does the seemingly impossible—he actually makes you forget Jack Nicholson". Musical America wrote, "Bringing all this to life was a first-rate cast led by Brian Mulligan, who used his powerful baritone and looming physicality to explore the terrifying drama of Jack's internal battle. Exuding immense charm in the opening scenes, and a genuine desire to reconnect with Wendy and turn things right, he conveyed a sense of the inevitability behind the dark forces that torment him—a veritable operatic curse—and of the strength he needed to summon for the climactic scene". The Star Tribune wrote, "Brian Mulligan was an unforgettable Jack, alternately pathetic and terrifying and richly sung."

== Recordings ==
Brian Mulligan's debut solo album was released by Naxos Records in August 2017. The recording consisted of two song cycles by Dominick Argento: The Andrée Expedition and From the Diary of Virginia Woolf. Timothy Long is the pianist and Adam Abeshouse is the producer. The album was a critical success, and named Critics Choice by Opera News in the February 2018 issue. Gramophone reviewed the album as "... a succession of poignant gem-like moments, exquisite distillations of love and brief emotional surges...".

Brian Mulligan's second album, entitled Old Fashioned, is scheduled to be released by Bridge Records in January 2019. Craig Rutenberg is the pianist and Adam Abeshouse is the producer. The album consists of songs from the early part of the 20th century, made popular through renditions by great American baritones of the past, including Nelson Eddy, John Charles Thomas, Lawrence Tibbett, and Leonard Warren.

Mulligan has also been featured on recordings by ArkivMusic, Deutsche Grammophon, and Opera Rara/Warner Classics.
