= Fauré Quartet =

German piano quartet

- Years active: 1995; 31 years ago
- Members: Erika Geldsetzer (violin); Sascha Frömbling (viola); Konstantin Heidrich (cello); Dirk Mommertz (piano)
- Website: Official website
- Awards: Deutscher Musikwettbewerb; ECHO Klassik; Brahms-Preis

The Fauré Quartet is a German piano quartet, named after Gabriel Fauré. Founded in 1995, they have performed internationally and recorded, including works written for them by composers such as Volker David Kirchner and Toshio Hosokawa.

== History ==
The piano quartet was founded in 1995 at the University of Music Karlsruhe and played its first concert there in January 1996. The players were at the beginning of their studies, which they continued at the Cologne University of Music. The Fauré Quartet has remained unchanged, with Erika Geldsetzer (violin), Sascha Frömbling (viola), Konstantin Heidrich (cello) and Dirk Mommertz (piano).

They recorded piano quartets by Schumann, Dvořák, Fauré and Suk for the label "Ars Musici". Since 2005, they recorded quartets by Mozart, Brahms and Mendelssohn for Deutsche Grammophon. In 2014, Sony Classical released an album with piano quartets and songs by Gustav Mahler and Richard Strauss, with soprano Simone Kermes.

The Fauré Quartet is regarded a pioneer in the piano quartet genre. In 2004, the University of Music Karlsruhe appointed the quartet as its "Ensemble in Residence". In this capacity, it has given concerts and taught master classes several times a year. In addition, it performs internationally in concert series and festivals.

In 2008, the Fauré Quartet and the Duisburg Philharmonic played the German premiere of the Symphonie Concertante by Alexandre Tansman, a concert for piano quartet and orchestra, composed in 1932. Volker David Kirchner composed four works for the Fauré Quartet: Echo und Narziss, Poème for piano quartet (2005), Psyche und Eros (2009), Der Große Tango (2012) and Klavierquartett IV (2015). In 2016, Toshio Hosokawa wrote for them The Water of Lethe, premiered in Heidelberg.

The members have teaching assignments at the Berlin University of the Arts and the University of Music and Theatre Munich, and teach master classes in Germany, Italy, Norway and the United States. In addition, the musicians have been trying for years to bring classical music closer to young people and children through children's concerts and the "Rhapsody in school" initiative.

In 2009, they expanded their repertoire with modern arrangements of selected songs from pop history. Deutsche Grammophon published this compilation under the title Popsongs. For this album, the quartet worked closely with the German producer Sven Helbig, who also arranged two songs for them. In 2013, they played the world premiere of his Pocket Symphonies, twelve short works for piano quartet and orchestra, which was also recorded for Deutsche Grammophon. In 2011, the Fauré Quartet performed on "Dein Song".

The quartet initiated an annual international chamber music festival, Festspielfrühling Rügen, on the island of Rügen, and directed it for the first years. In autumn 2018, the ensemble's album with arrangements of Mussorgsky's Pictures at an Exhibition and five of Rachmaninov's Études-Tableaux was released.

== Awards ==
- 1999: First prize Deutscher Musikwettbewerb
- 2000: Prize Premio Trio di Trieste
- 2000: Prize Premio Vittorio Gui (Florence)
- 2001: Ensemble prize Festspiele Mecklenburg-Vorpommern
- 2003: First prize Parkhouse Award
- 2008: ECHO Klassik for Brahms piano quartets
- 2008: Preis der Deutschen Schallplattenkritik
- 2008: Kunstpreis Rheinland-Pfalz
- 2010: Echo Klassik
- 2012: Brahms-Preis
- 2012: Musikpreis der Stadt Duisburg
