= Lev Natochenny =

Pianist

- Лев Наточенный
- Born: January 26, 1950 (age 76); Moscow
- Education: Moscow Conservatory, Juilliard School
- Occupations: Classical pianist, professor of piano

Lev Natochenny (Russian: Лев Наточенный) (born January 26, 1950) is a Russian-American classical pianist and professor of piano.

Born in Moscow, Natochenny graduated from the Moscow "Tchaikovsky" Conservatoire, where he was taught by Lev Oborin. He also studied with Boris Zemliansky and Eliso Virsaladze as well as with Alexei Lubimov (chamber music) and worked in the violin class with David Oistrakh.

In 1978, because of his discontent with the Soviet government's control of the music scene, Natochenny applied for and was granted the permission to leave the USSR, which he did in 1978. He went on to receive a gold medal and Second Prize at the 1981 Busoni International Piano Competition in Bolzano, Italy while he was stateless.

In the West Natochenny had further study with Ania Dorfmann at the Juilliard School. He held teaching positions at the Manhattan School of Music, the Mannes College of Music (The New School) and the City University of New York. He now holds a Lifetime Distinguished Professor Chair at the Frankfurt University of Music and Performing Arts in Frankfurt. From 1988 to 2004 Natochenny was the founder and artistic director of Meranofest International Music Festival in Meran, Italy which built a reputation as "the summer meeting point for young pianists" and in 1995 he was the Member of International Honorary Committee of the Worldwide Dictionary of Music (Editor: Olympia Tolika) of European Art Center of Greece.

Among his students are ECHO Music Award winners Martin Stadtfeld, Fauré Quartet, as well as winners of major international competitions Nami Ejiri, Soyeon Lee, Christopher Park, Evgenia Rubinova, Eugene Choi, Guoda Gedvilaite.

His discography includes a Juno-nominated album of Schubert’s Schwannengesang with Canadian baritone Kevin McMillan. Other noted recordings are selections from Brahms, Schubert, Shostakovich and Schnittke.

Natochenny is an American citizen and lives in New York and in Frankfurt am Main.
