= Charlotte Hellekant =

Swedish mezzo-soprano singer

Anna Charlotte Hellekant (born 15 January 1962 in Stockholm) is a Swedish operatic mezzo-soprano.

Hellekant studied at the Philadelphia and New York conservatories. She began her career in 1989 and played among others Dido, Ariadne auf Naxos, Cherubino in The Marriage of Figaro and Dorabella in Così fan tutte on American stages.
