= Jan-Hendrik Rootering =

German opera singer

Jan-Hendrik Rootering (born 18 March 1950 in Wedingfeld near Flensburg) is a German-born operatic bass, son of the Dutch tenor Hendrikus Rootering from whom he had his first lessons. After further study at Hamburg's Musikhochschule he began singing minor roles with the Staatsoper Hamburg and made a debut at the Bayerischen Staatsoper München in 1982 as the Spirit Messenger in Die Frau ohne Schatten. In 1987 he received the title of Bayerischer Kammersänger. Rootering was the bass soloist in the Beethoven Ninth Symphony conducted by Leonard Bernstein in celebration of the fall of the Berlin wall—in the no-longer-divided city of Berlin—at Christmastime 1989.

He can be seen as Fasolt on James Levine's The Ring of the Nibelung, and as the Speaker of the Temple on Wolfgang Sawallisch's The Magic Flute, and heard on two recital discs of Lieder by Richard Strauss and Hugo Wolf with pianist Herman Lechler.

== Sources ==
- Notes to Hugo Wolf Lieder (Calig-Verlag cal 50870)
- Biography from Bach-cantatas.com
