= Rene Dierkes =

German politician (born 1991)

Member of the Landtag of Bavaria
- Incumbent
- Assumed office 30 October 2023

Personal details
- Born: 12 September 1991 (age 34) Nürnberg
- Party: Alternative for Germany

Rene Dierkes (born 12 September 1991) is a German politician serving as a member of the Landtag of Bavaria since 2023. He has served as chairman of the Alternative for Germany in eastern Munich since 2022.
