= Robert Gambill =

American opera singer

- Born: March 31, 1955 (age 70); Indianapolis
- Occupation: Singer

Robert Gambill (born March 31, 1955, in Indianapolis) is an opera singer (Heldentenor).

== Biography ==
Gambill studied mathematics at Purdue University (1973–1976) before becoming an exchange student at Hamburg University in Germany, where he added German studies to his curriculum. He enrolled at the Hochschule für Musik und Theater in Hamburg where he studied voice with Prof. Hans Kagel. At 25 he made his La Scala debut in the leading role of Michael in the world premiere of Karlheinz Stockhausen's Donnerstag aus Licht, directed by Luca Ronconi.

He remained in Europe, and in 1984 joined the ensemble of the Zurich Opera in Switzerland. For three years he sang the leading lyric and belcanto tenor roles in operas such as Don Giovanni, The Magic Flute, The Barber of Seville and Die Lustigen Weiber von Windsor. His international career kicked off after he sang the role of Lindoro in Rossini's The Italian Girl in Algiers in 1987, directed by Michael Hampe.

It was followed by engagements at the leading European and international opera houses including the Vienna State Opera, the Royal Opera Covent Garden in London, the Opera in Paris, the Munich State Opera and the Metropolitan Opera in New York.

In 1995, he successfully made the change into the dramatic German repertoire. He studied with Prof. Irmgard Hartmann-Dressler and was quickly recognized with appearances as Painter in Berg's Lulu at the Salzburg Festival and Narraboth in Strauss' Salome at both the Stuttgart State Opera and London's Royal Opera House. He continued as a Heldentenor with acclaimed and ongoing performances as Wagner's Tannhäuser, Tristan, Siegmund and Parsifal on opera and concert stages around the world.

He sang the heroic tenor parts under the baton of important conductors such as Riccardo Muti, Daniel Barenboim, Claudio Abbado, Wolfgang Sawallisch, Giuseppe Sinopoli, Simon Rattle or Zubin Mehta at the opera houses in New York, London, Paris, San Francisco, Chicago, Berlin, Munich, Vienna, Milan as well as at Carnegie Hall and at the festivals in Salzburg (Easter & Summer), Aix-en-Provence, Tanglewood, Glyndebourne and many others.

== Teaching ==
2006 Robert Gambill became a Professor at the Universität der Künste (UdK) in Berlin.

== Discography LP/CD ==
- Donnerstag aus Licht, Stockhausen, DGG 1979
- Stabat Mater, Gioacchino Rossini, Catherine Malfitano, Agnes Baltsa, Robert Gambill, Gwynne Howell; Riccardo Muti, EMI 1981
- Acis und Galatea, Händel/Mozart, Edith Mathis, Anthony Rolf Johnson, Robert Gambill, Robert Lloyd: Peter Schreier, Orfeo 1982
- Manon Lescaut, Giacomo Puccini, Mirella Freni, Plácido Domingo, Renato Bruson, Kurt Rydl, Robert Gambill: Giuseppe Sinopoli, DGG 1984
- Der Messias, Georg Friedrich Händel, Lucia Popp, Brigette Fassbender, Robert Gambill, Robert Holl: Neville Marriner, EMI 1984
- Les Ballets Russe, Vol. 6, Igor Stravinsky, "Pulcinella", Arleen Auger, Robert Gambill, Gerolf Scheder: Christopher Hogwood, HÄNSSLER CLASSIC 1985
- Paradis und die Peri, Robert Schumann, Edith Wiens, Ann Gjevang, Robert Gambill: Armin Jordan, ERATO 1988
- Fierrabras, Franz Schubert, Robert Holl, Karita Mattila, Thomas Hampson, Laszlo Polgar, Josef Protschka, Cheryl Studer: Claudia Abbado, DGG 1988
- Les Pèlerins de la Mecque, Christoph Willibald Gluck, Robert Gambill, Julie Kaufmann, Iris Vermillion, Ulrich Ress, Jan-Hendrik Rootering: Leopold Hager, ORFEO 1991
- Die Entführung aus dem Serail, W. A. Mozart, Cheryl Studer, Elżbieta Szmytka, Kurt Streit, Robert Gambill, Günther Missenhardt: Bruno Weil, Sony 1992
- Messa di Gloria, Gioacchino Rossini, Anna Caterina Antonacci, Bernadette Manca di Nissa, Francisco Araiza, Robert Gambill, Pietro Spagnoli: Salvatore Accardo, RICCORDI, 1992
- Die Jahreszeiten, Joseph Haydn, Ruth Ziesak, Robert Gambill, Alfred Muff: Wolfgang Sawallisch, Hänssler Classic 1994
- Cleopatra & Cesare, Carl Heinrich Graun, Janet Williams, Iris Vermillion, Lynne Dawson, Robert Gambill, Ralf Papkin, Jeffrey Francis,: René Jacobs, HARMONIA MUNDI, 1996
- „Fieber“, Franz Lehár, Robert Gambill: Klauspeter Seibel, CPO 1996
- Moses, Max Bruch, Michael Volle, Robert Gambill: Claus Peter Flor, ORFEO 1999
- Die Walküre, Richard Wagner, Robert Gambill, Angela Denoke, Attila Jung, Renate Behle, Ticina Vaughn, Jan-Hendrik Rootering: Lothar Zagrosek, NAXOS 2003
- The Nine Symphonies, Ludwig van Beethoven, "Symphony No. 9", Soile Isokoski, Rosemarie Lang, Robert Gambill, Renè Pape: Daniel Barenboim, TELDEC 2004
- Sinfonie Nr. 8, Gustav Mahler, Sylvia Greenberg, Lynne Dawson, Robert Gambill, Detlef Roth, Jan-Hendrik Rootering: Kent Nagano, HARMONIA MUNDI 2005
- Idomeneo, W.A. Mozart/ Richard Strauss Fassung, Robert Gambill, Britta Stallmeister, Camilla Nylund, Iris Vermillion: Fabio Luisi, ORFEO 2007

== DVD ==
- L‘italiana in Algieri, Gioacchino Rossini, Günther von Kannen, Nuccia Focile, Robert Gambill, Doris Soffel, Enric Serra: Ralf Weikert/Michael Hampe, ARTHAUS 1987
- L‘occasione fa il ladro, Gioacchino Rossini, Susan Patterson, Robert Gambill, Natale de Carolis, Monica Bacelli: Ganluigi Gelmetti/Machael Hampe, EUROARTS 1992
- Salome, Richard Strauss, Catherine Malfitano, Bryn Terfel, Kenneth Riegel, Anja Silja, Robert Gambill: Christoph von Dohnányi/Luc Bondy, DECCA 1997
- Die Walküre, Richard Wagner, Robert Gambill, Angela Denoke, Attila Jung, Renate Behle, Ticina Vaughn, Jan-Hendrik Rootering: Lothar Zagrosek/Christoph Nel, EUROARTS 2003
- Tristan und Isolde, Richard Wagner, Nina Stemme, Robert Gambill, Katarina Karnéus, Bo Skovhus, René Pape: Jirí Belohlávek/Nikolaus Lehnhoff, OPUSARTE, 2008
- Die Walküre, Richard Wagner, Robert Gambill, Eva-Maria Westbroek, Mikhail Petrenko, Eva Johansson, Lilli Paasikivi, Willard White: Simon Rattle/Stéphane Braunschweig, BELAIR CLASSIQUES 2008
- Tannhäuser, Richard Wagner, Robert Gambill, Camilla Nylund, Waltraud Meier, Roman Trekel, Stephen Milling: Philippe Jordan/Nikolaus Lehnhoff, ARTHAUS 2008
- Elektra, Richard Strauss, Iréne Theorin, Waltraud Meier, Eva-Maria Westbroeck, Robert Gambill, René Pape: Daniele Gatti/Nikolaus Lehnhoff, ARTHAUS 2010
