= Katharina Magiera =

German operatic contralto

- Education: Frankfurt University of Music and Performing Arts
- Occupation: Operatic contralto
- Organizations: Oper Frankfurt
- Website: www.katharinamagiera.de

Katharina Magiera is a German operatic contralto. A member of the Oper Frankfurt, she has appeared in major European opera houses. She is active also as a lieder singer and has recorded.

== Career ==
Magiera first studied piano and voice to be a music teacher in Mannheim. She studied voice at the Musikhochschule Frankfurt with Hedwig Fassbender from 2003.

She has been a member of the ensemble of the Oper Frankfurt from 2009, where she appeared as Wanja in Mikhail Glinka's Iwan Sussanin, as the Narrator in Debussy's La Damoiselle élue, as St. Catherine in Honegger's Jeanne d'Arc au bûcher), as Nancy in Flotow's Martha which was recorded, as Margret in Berg's Wozzeck), Marcellina in Mozart's Le nozze di Figaro, the Third Lady in his Die Zauberflöte and as Annina in Der Rosenkavalier by Richard Strauss, among others. In the 2017/18 season, she has performed the roles of Lisa, a former SS officer in Auschwitz, in Weinberg's Die Passagierin, of Maddalena in Verdi's Rigoletto, and Teresa in Bellini's La sonnambula. She has been Floßhilde in Wagners Der Ring des Nibelungen from 2010, staged by Vera Nemirova and conducted by Sebastian Weigle, which was live recorded on DVD.

She appeared as a guest as Hänsel in Humperdick's Hänsel und Gretel at the die Bavarian State Opera, as Schwertleite in Wagner's Die Walküre at the Opéra du Rhin and at the Salzburg Easter Festival. She performed Mozart's Third Lady at the Paris Opéra.

In concert, she appeared as a soloist in Mozart's Requiem, conducted by Teodor Currentzis, at his debut at the Salzburg Festival in 2017. She recorded songs on texts by Goethe with guitar accompaniment.
