= Zanda Švēde =

American mezzo-soprano

- Born: Latvia
- Education: Jāzeps Vītols Latvian Academy of Music
- Occupation: Operatic mezzo-soprano
- Organizations: Oper Frankfurt
- Website: www.zandasvede.com

Zanda Švēde is a Latvian operatic mezzo-soprano, based at the Oper Frankfurt.

== Life and career ==
Born in Latvia, Švēde studied voice at the Jāzeps Vītols Latvian Academy of Music in Riga. She then trained at the Merola program of the San Francisco Opera, with roles such as Suzuki in Puccini's Madama Butterfly, Maddalena in Verdi's Rigoletto, Tisbe in Rossini's La Cenerentola and Lena in the premiere of Marco Tutino's La Ciociara. She became a member of the studio of the Oper Frankfurt with the 2018/19 season.

She has performed the title role of Bizet's Carmen Latvian National Opera, the Pittsburgh Opera, Seattle Opera, and the Lyric Opera of Kansas City. In 2025 she portrayed Pythia in Reimann's Melusine.
