= Rappresentatione di Anima, et di Corpo =

1600 Opera/oratorio by Emilio de' Cavalieri

Rappresentatione di anima et di corpo
- opera/oratorio by Emilio de' Cavalieri
- Librettist: Agostino Manni
- Language: Italian
- Premiere: February 1600; Oratorio dei Filippini, Rome

Rappresentatione di anima et di corpo (Italian for Portrayal of the Soul and the Body) is a musical work by Emilio de' Cavalieri to a libretto by Agostino Manni (1548–1618). With it, Cavalieri regarded himself as the composer of the first opera or oratorio. Whether he was actually the first is subject to some academic debate, as is whether the work is better categorized as an opera or an oratorio. It was first performed in Rome in February 1600 in the Oratorio dei Filippini adjacent to the church of Santa Maria in Vallicella.

== The first opera ==
It was imagined during the Renaissance, almost certainly incorrectly, that Greek drama was sung, not declaimed, and that therefore opera was a revival of ancient practice. On 10 November 1600 Emilio de Cavalieri wrote a letter arguing that he, not Jacopo Peri, was the true reviver of Greek style acting with singing, i.e. opera. Peri later deferred to him in the preface to the published version of Euridice in 1601. (Euridice had received its first performance in October 1600). The music historian Joachim Steinheuer comments that Cavalieri was a pioneer of "recitation in singing or 'recitar cantando'"; this type of declamation was a major innovation in enabling the introduction of extended dramatic monologues and dialogues, as required in opera.

Since the Rappresentatione is fully staged, in three acts with a spoken prologue, it can be considered to be the earliest surviving opera.

== Editions ==
There are modern editions of the "opera":

- Emilio de Cavalieri, (ed. Philip Thorby), Rappresentatione di anima et di corpo, (King's Music, 1994);
- the American Institute of Musicology, edition of 2007 (Modern score and one volume of facsimiles and translations).

== Recordings ==
- directed by Sergio Vartolo (Naxos 8.554096-97).
- by the ensembles Magnificat and The Whole Noyse with Judith Nelson (Anima) and Paul Hillier (Corpo), CD Koch Records;
- by Akademie für Alte Musik Berlin & Choir of State Opera Berlin, conducted by René Jacobs; Cité de la Musique 2012 – Broadcast by ARTE;
- 2000 Basilica San Paolo Fuori Le Mura, Rome video recording of a concert performance conducted by Lorenzo Tozzi with Coro Lirico Sinfonico Romano and Roma Barroca Orchestra, with soloists Cecilia Gasdia (soprano), Furio Zanasi (baritone), Roberto Staccioli, Massimo Rossetti, Stefano Cucci, and Lucilla Tumino.
- Recorded in 2005 by ensemble L'Arpeggiata under the direction of Christina Pluhar on Alpha Productions (France) B0007VF21Y.
- 2021 Theater an der Wien video recording conducted by Giovanni Antonini, with Il Giardino Armonico and Arnold Schoenberg Chor, directed for stage by Robert Carsen (Naxos Blu-Ray and DVD).
