= Christus (Liszt) =

Musical composition by Franz Liszt

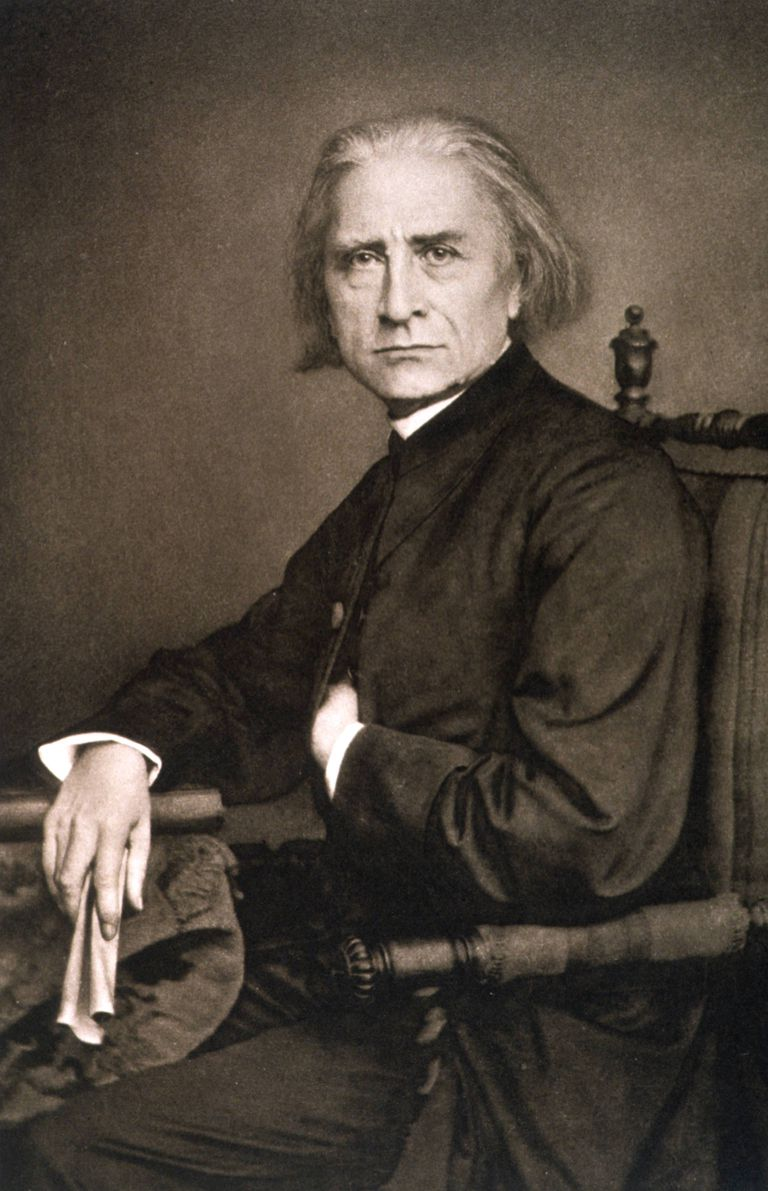
Franz Liszt, photo (mirror-imaged) by Franz Hanfstaengl, June 1870

Christus (S.3, composed 1862–66) is an oratorio by the Hungarian composer and pianist Franz Liszt. The oratorio takes the traditional plot of Jesus Christ's life from his birth to his passion and resurrection, using Bible texts, and is thus somewhat reminiscent of another famous religious work, Messiah by George Frideric Handel.

== Composition ==
When Liszt, after his prolific Weimar years, moved to Rome in 1861, the majority of his works for the next ten years would be religious music for choir. The composition of his most famous oratorio, Christus, occupied Liszt from 1862 to 1866, with shorter or longer pauses. He finished the score by the end of September 1866, but he wished to make some revisions and corrections, and therefore the work was not completed until the December of that year. 'Christus' was published in 1872 and premiered in the Protestant church at Weimar on 29 May 1873.

== Structure ==
The oratorio is of around three hours in duration and requires significant orchestral and vocal forces, which makes it rather a rarity in concert halls of today, and despite this most of the work is of almost chamber proportions and quite personal in mood. For the text Liszt uses the Bible, the Catholic liturgy and some ancient Latin hymns; in that sense he did not want to experiment. It is of note that the role of the orchestra in the oratorio is really more significant than that of the chorus, the orchestra being the moving force of growth and development (like in Wagner's operas). This is unlike earlier, baroque and classical oratorios, where the chorus prevails, and the orchestra simply acts as a commentary, providing harmonic texture. The oratorio lacks recitative sections, although the score is periodically annotated with Latin passages as though explaining what the music is depicting, or the underlying emotional or religious relevance. It is unclear whether or not these passages are meant to be spoken by a narrator during the music. Some performances have done this to great effect, although the majority omit them.

The work consists of three parts:

1. Christmas Oratorio (of five movements)
2. After Epiphany (of five movements)
3. Passion and Resurrection (of four movements)

The movements are so few (unlike 'Messiah') because of their length and structural span, in which the only exception is the 'O filii et filiae' from the Part Three, lasting merely two minutes. In his earlier works Liszt had often used the idea of musical motifs and themes undergoing transformations and modifications in order to achieve greater coherence and inter-connection: in this respect 'Christus' is no exception. Also, many motifs from Gregorian chants have been recognized, which greatly add to the unity of the work. The most obvious motif underpinning the entire oratorio is that of the simple perfect fifth interval, heard as the opening of the plainchant for Advent of the Rorate coeli at the very beginning of the oratorio, occurring in the majority of movements in some way, sometimes as a melodic gesture, sometimes with harmonic implications, and ending up as the main subject for the great fugue which closes the whole oratorio.

== Music ==
=== Part One: Christmas Oratorio ===
1. Motivum - Introduction
2. Pastorale and Annunciation
3. Stabat Mater speciosa ('Stood the beautiful Mother')
4. Song of the Shepherds at the Manger
5. The Three Kings

The narrator (see above) brings the 'motivum' of the work at the very opening, speaking in Latin, and then follows the introduction by the orchestra, once more punctuated by the voice of the narrator, bringing the words from Isaiah, 45:8. The introduction is largely of light, pastoral atmosphere, and its duration is around 18 minutes. It is a kind of free polyphonic fantasy on the plainchant for Advent 'Rorate coeli', building from a quiet start seamlessly to a climax.

In the 'Pastorale and Annunciation', we hear the soprano and tenor soloists and the choir for the first time. Supported and coloured by the orchestra, they sing of the angels coming among some shepherds, heralding the birth of Jesus Christ (Luke, 2:10-14). The Angelus music is based upon the perfect-fifth derived from the 'Rorate coeli'.

'Stabat Mater speciosa' is a long, nearly a capella movement for chorus and some organ passages. The Latin hymn which is sung is a 'sister-hymn' to 'Stabat Mater dolorosa', and is to be sung to a rather similar melody, yet is in brighter, calmer mood and the words are different, describing Mary watching little Jesus in his cradle and at play.

In the 'Song of the Shepherds at the Manger', the pastoral atmosphere reaches its climax in gentle and merry melodies of the oboes, clarinets and bassoons, again based on the perfect-fifth interval. The music constantly builds up and by the end of the movement reaches its joyous and dance-like peak. This movement, it is important to add, is entirely instrumental.

The closing movement of this part, 'The Three Kings', is in fact a march on a grand scale which starts with a quiet but steady and springy tread and moves inexorably on to close fortissimo with the full orchestra. The movement includes the narrator (see above), with words of the journey of the Three Kings (Matthew 2:9,11). There are three main themes of this movement. While all the themes are independent, all begin with the same germ idea. The first one begins with a rising perfect fifth, depicting the march. Another one, depicting the star, on a descending arpeggio of the triad outlining the fifth (so this is the fifth in inversion, and transformation). And the third is more sinuous, its opening rising phrase outlining the intervalic rise to the fifth, and then descending the fifth back to the tonic as an arpeggio (and is thus also a motivic combination of the other two). All three themes are developed and Part One ends magnificently and optimistically.

=== Part Two: After Epiphany ===
6. The Beatitudes
7. Pater noster: The Lord's Prayer
8. The Foundation of the Church
9. The Miracle
10. The Entry into Jerusalem

Part Two opens with 'The Beatitudes', composed for baritone, chorus and organ. It is pensive, calm and meditative, the sound not so rich as in Part One, as this movement represents a model of restraint and economy of means. It was in fact written earlier, in 1855, and Liszt simply decided to use it as a part of the oratorio.

The next movement is a setting of the Lord's Prayer for chorus and organ. The murmuring of Latin text and pensiveness of mood is much alike the first movement.

'The Foundation of the Church', however, 'wakes up' the chorus and Christ's words 'Tu es Petrus, et super hanc petram...' (Matthew 16,18) sound firm and decisive. To this is contrasted the other part of the movement, more gentle, with words from John, 21:15-17.

'The Miracle' describes the scene of Christ walking on the waters of the Sea of Galilee. It is scored for narrator baritone, chorus and orchestra, but vocal resources are limited in their use and orchestra plays the main role of depiction. The music is at first dramatic, as the storm rises huge waves, and the apostles cry to Jesus their pleads of 'Domine, salva nos, perimus!' ('Save us, Lord, for we will perish!'). Then, Jesus stops the storm and winds and the rest of the movement passes in great tranquillity.

'The Entry into Jerusalem' employs soloists, chorus and orchestra, celebrating the arrival of the son of David and King of Israel, and brings Part Two of 'Christus' to a glorious close amidst cries of 'Hosanna!'.

=== Part Three: Passion and Resurrection ===
11. Tristis est anima mea ('Sad is my soul')
12. Stabat Mater dolorosa ('Stood the grievous Mother')
13. O filii et filiae ('O sons and daughters')
14. Resurrexit! ('He has risen!')

The final part of the oratorio begins with a sombre and pain-filled movement 'Tristis est anima mea'. Here Jesus talks to his Father, meditates over all the horrors that await him, however 'sed non quod ego volo, sed quod tu'. The sparing use of the baritone soloist makes the words even more effective and meaningful. The orchestra once more plays the significant part.

After this follows 'Stabat Mater dolorosa', an ancient Latin hymn, doleful and gloomy. This is the longest single movement of the entire work (approx. 30 mins.), and employs all the orchestra and vocal forces, but in a mood quite opposite to many usual oratorios where using all the vocals heralds glory and joy. The movement is in fact a long, painful lament of Mary's fate - to see the death of her son. Yet towards the end the music gathers strength, becomes at some places furious, passionate and victorious in tone. This, of course, anticipates Christ's resurrection, the victory of life over death.

The short Easter hymn 'O filii et filiae' is a contrast to 'Stabat Mater', for it is very short (2 mins.), uses only the female chorus with just the harmonium, and is of much brighter, expectant mood. The words tell us of Mary Magdalene finding Christ's grave opened, and the chamber empty.

The final movement of the oratorio is 'Resurrexit!', a joyous, jubilant chorus backed up by the entire orchestra, celebrating Christ's resurrection. It is, in fact, a parallel to Händel's famous 'Hallelujah!', and quite similar in overall mood. So Liszt's greatest oratorio closes, using the full vocal and orchestral forces, with proclamations that 'Christ is risen!'. The motivic rising fifth is used to symbolize the "rising of Christ" as a fugal subject, unadorned, and this is the main subject. The fifth is stated once, then repeated a tone higher, then again a tone higher still. Six notes only, all derived from the same place as the very start of the oratorio. In this way Liszt, like Bach, uses his treatment of music to expound theological messages.

== Complete recordings ==
- 1970: Miklós Forrai (conductor), on Hungaroton. Hungarian State Orchestra, Budapest Choir.
- 1985: James Conlon (conductor), on Erato Records. Rotterdam Philharmonic Orchestra, Slovak Philharmonic Chorus.
- 1986: Antal Doráti (conductor), on Hungaroton. Hungarian State Orchestra, Hungarian Radio & Television Chorus.
- 1997: Helmuth Rilling (conductor), on Hänssler Classic. Stuttgart Radio Symphony Orchestra, Gächinger Kantorei.
- 2001: Joshard Daus (conductor), on GLOR Classics. Jenaer Philharmonie, EuropaChorAkademie.
- 2006: Roman Kofman (conductor), on MD&G. Beethoven Orchester Bonn, Czech Philharmonic Choir.
- 2024: Michael Schönheit (conductor), on Rondeau Production. Merseburger Hofmusik, Collegium Vocale Leipzig, Philharmonischer Chor Dresden
