= Requiem für einen jungen Dichter =

1969 composition by Bernd Alois Zimmermann

- Lingual
- Oratorio by Bernd Alois Zimmermann
- English: Requiem for a Young Poet
- Text: Literary, philosophical and political texts
- Language: Latin; German; Russian; others
- Composed: 1967–1969
- Performed: 1969
- Scoring: Soprano; baritone; 2 speakers; 3 choirs; orchestra; jazz band

Requiem für einen jungen Dichter (Requiem for a Young Poet) is an extended composition by Bernd Alois Zimmermann, written from 1967 to 1969 for two speakers, soprano and baritone soloists, three choirs, jazz band, organ, tapes and a large orchestra. Subtitled Lingual (speech work), it sets a text that includes the Latin liturgical Mass for the Dead and literary, philosophical, religious and political texts, related to politics and the history of mind during the composer's life. The work has elements of a cantata, an oratorio and an audio play.

Requiem für einen jungen Dichter was published by Schott, and has been recorded several times.

== History ==
Zimmermann composed Requiem für einen jungen Dichter on a commission by the broadcaster Westdeutscher Rundfunk. He worked on it from 1967 to 1969. The composition for two speakers, soprano and baritone soloists, three choirs, jazz band, organ, tapes and a large orchestra is based on a text which juxtaposes the Latin liturgical Mass for the Dead with literary, philosophical, religious and political texts. They relate to political events and the history of mind which influenced the composer's life from 1918 to 1969. Three poets whose texts are quoted in the work ended their life in suicide, as Zimmermann's also: Vladimir Mayakovsky, Konrad Bayer and Sergei Yesenin. The motto of the work, "What can we hope for? There is nothing that awaits us except death" ("frage: worauf hoffen? / es gibt nichts was zu erreichen wäre, außer dem tod."), was written by Bayer. Taped additions include the voices of the philosopher Ludwig Wittgenstein (from his Philosophical Investigations), Pope John XXIII, James Joyce (Molly Bloom's Monologue from Ulysses), Alexander Dubček (an address to the Czech people), Hitler, Chamberlain, Georgios Papandreou, Ezra Pound, Kurt Schwitters, Albert Camus and Sándor Weöres. Quoted music includes fragments from Wagner's Tristan und Isolde, Milhaud's La création du monde, Messiaen's L'Ascension and The Beatles' "Hey Jude". In the section Dona nobis pacem (Grant us peace), excerpts from Beethoven's Ninth Symphony are contrasted with texts by Joachim von Ribbentrop, Stalin, Goebbels, Churchill and Bayer. The work has elements of a cantata, an oratorio and an audio play.

Requiem für einen jungen Dichter was premiered in 1969 at the Tonhalle Düsseldorf. Michael Gielen conducted the Kölner Rundfunkchor, prepared by Herbert Schernus, and the Kölner Rundfunk-Sinfonie-Orchester, with soloists Edda Moser and Günter Reich, speakers Hans Franzen and Matthias Fuchs, and the Manfred-Schoof-Quintett. It was published by Schott.

== Structure and scoring ==
Zimmermann structured the work in six movements. Only the first and the last have the titles from the Latin Requiem, the others are titled in Italian:

1. Prolog, Requiem I
2. Rappresentazione
3. Elegia
4. Tratto
5. Lamento
6. Dona nobis pacem

The duration is given as a little longer than an hour. Zimmermann scored the work for two speakers, soprano and baritone soloists, three choirs, a jazz combo, organ, tapes and a large orchestra of 4 flutes (all doubling on piccolo), 4 oboes (1–3 also oboe d'amore), 4 clarinets (4 also bass clarinet), alto saxophone (also soprano and tenor saxophone), tenor saxophone (also baritone saxophone), 3 bassoons (3 also contrabassoon), 5 horns (4 and 5 also tenor tuba), 4 trumpets, bass trumpet, 5 trombones, bass tuba, percussion (6 players: triangle, crotales, cymbals, 4 tamtams, 3 tomtoms, small drums, large drums, triangle, 4 marimbas, legnophon, harp, glockenspiel), mandolin, accordion, harp, 2 pianos, and strings (10 cellos and 8 basses).

== Recordings ==
Requiem für einen jungen Dichter was first recorded on June 20, 1971, in a performance at the Holland Festival given by the Radio Filharmonisch Orkest conducted by Michael Gielen (who had also conducted the première) with singers Günter Reich and Dorothy Dorow. Recorded by Deutsche Grammophon, it was released as a private pressing in 1980, available free on written request from the Bundesverband der Deutschen Industrie.

The second recording was made on September 23 and 24, 1986, with the choir and orchestra of the WDR, conducted by Gary Bertini, with singers Phyllis Bryn-Julson and Roland Hermann, speakers Lutz Lansemann and Hans Franzen, and the Manfred-Schoof-Quintett.

Michael Gielen recorded the work again in 1995 with soloists Vlatka Oršanić and James Johnson, speakers Bernhard Schir and Christoph Grund, the Edinburgh Festival Chorus, Bratislava Slovak Chorus, Bratislava City Chorus, WDR Rundfunkchor Köln, Südfunk-Chor Stuttgart, Southwest German Radio Symphony Orchestra and Alexander von Schlippenbach Jazz Band. A reviewer of this recording notes that the work "is a humbling polyphony of twentieth-century misdeeds – riveting, provocative, uncompromising and as essential to our understanding of 1960s 'serious' music as The Beatles are to an informed perception of that decade's pop culture."

Requiem für einen jungen Dichter was recorded a fourth time in 2008 by Cybele Records, with soloists Claudia Barainsky and David Pittman-Jennings, speakers Michael Rotschopf and Lutz Lansemann, the Czech Philharmonic Choir Brno, the Slovak Philharmonic Choir, EuropaChorAkademie, Eric Vloeimans Quintet, Holland Symfonia, conducted by Bernhard Kontarsky. The recording follows the specifications to position the three choirs at different locations in the hall. A reviewer notes: "Freedom, ideology, liberation, human dignity, struggle and death – all of these issues dealt with in a vast dramatic canvas".

A further performance conducted by Michael Gielen, with the SWR Sinfonieorchester Baden-Baden und Freiburg and singers Isolde Siebert, Renate Behle and Richard Salter, was released in 2021 on volume 10 of the Michael Gielen Edition. This recording was made on 17 April 1999 as a final rehearsal for the US première of the work which took place on 20 April (but which was not recorded).
