= Angelo Evelyn =

Canadian artist (1942–2023)

Angelo Evelyn (1942-2023) was a Canadian artist. In the course of his career, Evelyn resided and maintained studios in Montreal, Canada, Bremen, Germany, Paris, France Aachen, Germany, Trondheim, Norway, and Rotterdam, Netherlands.

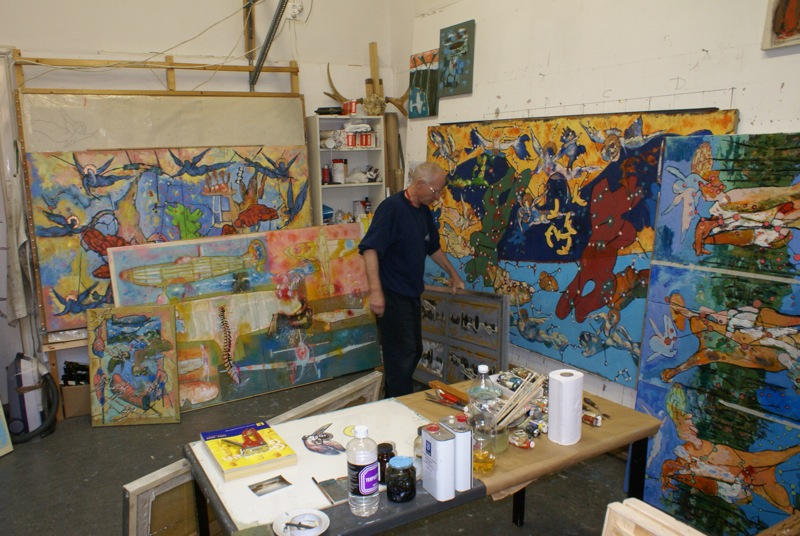
Angelo Evelyn in his workshop in Rotterdam

== Early life ==
Evelyn was born in Saint John, New Brunswick, Canada, and grew up in Vancouver, British Columbia, where he obtained a degree in Physics and Mathematics at the University of British Columbia.

From May 1966 to February 1967, known as Fred A. Evelyn, he was on meteorological officer training in Ottawa, Toronto, and CFB Trenton with John Gordon, Bob Clibbon, Brian Mason, Dave Philips, Alfred Warkentin, and David Hagborg amongst others.

In 1969, he traveled to England. Upon his return in 1970, he briefly held scientific positions in Montréal while simultaneously starting to paint as an autodidact. He soon moved back to Europe and Morocco, however, "filling many sketchbooks with drawings and small paintings." Returning to Montreal in 1971, he resumed his scientific position at McGill University.

In 1973, he left Canada, settling down in West Berlin where he enrolled in the Free University of Berlin, earning his livelihood as a painter of billboards for major commercial fairs and exhibitions, while also applying for admission at the Berlin art academy.

== Art school ==
In 1978, Evelyn learned that he would be admitted by the Bremen art academy (now the University of the Arts Bremen but known at the time as Hochschule für Gestaltung). Here, he studied painting and 3D design since 1979, obtaining a diploma in 2D design in 1983.

== Career ==
Evelyn has worked as an independent artist in various countries of Europe after completing art school. Having obtained his diploma, the artist moved to Paris in 1983, renting a small studio and engaging in printmaking (using aluminum plates) at the Cité des Artes. The results of his creative work in Paris were presented in Bremen in 1985 in a large solo exhibition entitled Collage - Print - Stencil.

=== In Germany ===
In 1985, Evelyn moved from Paris to Aachen, Germany, a provincial town close to the Belgian and Dutch border, where he was able to rent a large studio. In the same year, he had an exhibition at the gallery of Radio Omroep Zuid in Maastricht (The Netherlands). During the next year, he exhibited "in the Suermondt-Ludwig Museum"< and had an important solo exhibition in the "Neuer Aachener Kunstverein", both in Aachen, Germany. In that year, he was also artist-in-residence at the Frans Masereel Centre in Kasterlee, Belgium.

During this period, he sought to reach perfection as a printmaker by taking part in advanced courses in printmaking at the Frans-Masereel Centrum and in other advanced courses, offered by the Czech artist Rudolf Broulim at the RHok (Royal Academy of Arts) Brussels, where he also had a solo exhibition.

In 1987, Evelyn was commissioned to do the stage decor for a performance by Tone Brulin's company at the Studio Theater in Trondheim (Norway). The work Evelyn was commissioned to do by Tone Brulin was for Brulin's play Turandot. It was noteworthy that an avant-garde artist like Tone Brulin would choose Angelo Evelyn for the job.

=== In Norway ===
In 1988, Evelyn moved to Trondheim. Apparently, this was because Evelyn's Dutch wife Annie who had worked as an actress with the Cirque de Soleil, and who had performed in Brulin's Turandot, had obtained a job teaching Commedia dell'arte at the University of Trondheim (now the Norwegian University of Science and Technology) in 1987. The two rented a farm house in Leinstrand near Trondheim, where he established his new studio. The years in Norway are marked by seascapes inspired not only by the sea as such. They also comprised ecological themes that echoed his awareness of the Norwegian whaling industry and the industrial traces of the North Sea oil boom. Others were apparently tracing memories of tales heard about his father who was a captain in the Canadian navy during the war, in command of one of those ships that protected freighters on their way from North America to Murmansk.

In both 1988 and 1989, Evelyn participated in the annual Høstutstilling, or Statens Kunstutstilling at the no:Kunstnernes Hus or Artists House in Oslo, Norway which is described as the "viktigste" (most important) art exhibition in that country. He also received a large grant or stipend from the Norwegian government in 1989. In this year he had also solo exhibitions in Stavanger and in Molde (both in Norway).

=== Norway and Germany ===
While in Norway, Evelyn returned to Germany frequently to organize his exhibitions, among them the big exhibition in Bremen (Lilienthal) entitled "Bilder aus Norwegen und vom Kontinent" (Paintings from Norway and the Continent).

=== In the Netherlands ===
He finally moved from Trondheim to the Rotterdam area in 1993. In the Netherlands, he had difficulties initially to find an appropriate studio, and got involved instead in a Hilversum artist cooperative, the Grafisch Atelier t'Gooi.

==== Activities in Canada, Germany, Britain, etc. ====
In the same year, he had two solo exhibitions in Canada. And the next year, a group exhibition in the RHoK Art Academy in Brussels, together with two other artists, Niek Satijn and Erik Fliek, that was also shown in Hilversum.

In 1998, Evelyn founded an international print workshop (the Lithografie Werkstatt Eichstaett) together with two other artists, Li Portenlaenger and Armin Nischk. Simultaneously, the three artists staged the event "200 Jahre Lithographie" in public space and the university as well as in the cathedral Notre Dame de Sacre Coeur in Eichstaett (from July 26 to Aug. 18, 1998).

In the same year (1998), he also obtained an M.A. in print-making from the Wimbledon School of Art (Wimbledon College of Art, Wimbledon nr. London, England).

In September 2005, Evelyn had a joint exhibition in the Atelier Circulaire in Montreal together with the Canadian artist Ana Francine Béland. In 2005–2006, Angelo Evelyn and two other artists, Li Portenlänger and Luc Piron, as well as a poet based in Aachen, cooperated on a joint project to artistically reflect the anti-war essence and physical as well as aesthetic reality of a large ensemble of bigger-than-lifesize sculptures embedded in the Jurassic landscape near Eichstätt. The ensemble of sculptures, known locally as the Figurenfeld (field of figures) was created by the sculptor A. Wünsche-Mitterecker, as an early example of land art. It represented a post-battle scene of slaughter and horrid death. The theme was treated in the form of large lithographic prints by Evelyn.

In 2006, Evelyn took part in the Exposition d'Estampes "Voir Grand 2006" which featured very large prints by Canadian printmakers.

In 2005–2008, Evelyn was one of the artists from Quebec ("Artistes du Québec") participating in the Rencontre Panaméricaine de gravure sur bois.

On Nov. 24, 2008, the Donaukurier featured both Evelyn and his artist colleague Wolfgang Schmitz, discussing their exhibition. This daily has repeatedly focused on Evelyn, most recently in Feb. 2014, when the Donaukurier interviewed Evelyn. An official Eichstaett county (Landkreis Eichstatt) publication refers to him as "this globally renowned artist" ("diesen weltbekannten Künstler").

It was also in 2008 that Evelyn was artist in residence in Val-David, Quebec, Canada, creating lithographic prints at the Atelier de l'Île de Val-David. He also had a solo exhibition in the Atelier de l'Île in that year. And in the following year, 2009, the artist had a solo exhibition in the context of a multi-disciplinary encounter, "Incontri con la paleontologia, V edizione: Vacanze Eco-Educative [...]" in the Auditorium Giovanni Paolo II, Seminario Arcivescovile de Benevento, Benevento (Italy). In Benevento (near Naples), he presented 22 lithographic works, among them works he had created during his stay as artist in residence in Val David, Canada, a year earlier. He presented 22 lithographic prints on this occasion.

==== Recent international art expos he took part in ====
Among more recent international art exhibitions that Evelyn was invited to take part in, the following may be mentioned: In 2012, Evelyn was invited to participate in the Second European Lithography Days, Munich (Germany). In 2013 Evelyn took part in the group exhibition Blue Genes. Bilder zu einer Schnittstelle von Wissenschaft und Kunst (Blue Genes. Images relating to an interface of science and art, with Christine Burlon, David Clarkson, Soheyla B. Fahimi, and others. And in 2015, Evelyn took part in the 5e exposition internationale Bisannuelle D'Estampes Miniatures / Fifth International Miniature Print Biennale Exhibition organized by the Ottawa School of Art/'École d'art d'Ottawa. It is described as an "exposition d'une grande qualité". Angelo Evelyn showed his work "4 Head Aches".

== Teaching ==
Evelyn has given numerous workshops as a printmaker, for instance in Molde (Norway), and in Canada. He taught printmaking in 1990 at the Trondheim Art Academy. And in 1999–2000, he taught it at the École des Arts Décoratifs in Strasbourg, France. While teaching printmaking, he also sought to further perfect his knowledge of the art, attending intermittently the Wimbledon School of Art, where he obtained an M.A. in print-making in 1998.

== Curating ==
Evelyn curated a noted exhibition of Dutch artists in Bremen, "The Netherlands Meets Bremen", together with Henk van der Haar.

== Collections (selection) ==
Evelyn's work is part of numerous public collections including the Kommunale Galerie der Stadt Bremen (Municipal Gallery of the City of Bremen), Bremen (Germany), the Graphothek, Bremen (Germany), the Bonnefantenmuseum) (Kunstuitleen), Maastricht (The Netherlands), the Department of Foreign Affairs and International Trade, Ottawa (Canada), the Musée Régional de Rimouski, Rimouski (Quebec, Canada), the Catholic University of Eichstätt-Ingolstadt, Eichstätt (Germany), the City Hall of Capelle a/d Ijssel (the Netherlands), the Molde Kunstforeningen, Molde (Norway), the Bibliothèque nationale du Québec (Quebec, Canada), and the Bibliothèque nationale de France, Paris (France) .

== Solo exhibitions (selection) ==
- Key-Leaf-Monument, VHS Galerie (am Schwarzen Meer), Bremen (D)
- Weather Keys, Grafisch Atelier 't Gooi, Hilversum (NL)
- Het horende oog, Gallery of the IFF, Hilversum (NL)
- Topologies Organiques, Galerie Engramme, Quebec (QC)
- Blood Pump & Other Themes, Galerie sans Nom, Moncton (CDN)
- Organ Gefühle & andre Tema, Rogaland Kunstnersenter, Stavanger (N)
- The Insides of the Whale, Molde Kunstforeningen, Molde (N)
- Burning Cloud & Other Themes, Galerie van het RHoK, Brussels (B)
- New Works of Angelo Evelyn, Neuer Aachener Kunstverein, Aachen (D)
- Paintings-Collages-Prints, Galerie van Radio Omroep Zuid, Maastricht (NL)

== Group exhibitions (selection) ==
- Natürlicherkünstlich (Jahresausstellung), Messehaus am Markt, Leipzig (D)
- Wolfgang Schmitz (Album der Schüler), Museum Katharinenhof, Kranenburg (D)
- Hybrid, Triskel Gallery, Cork (EIR)
- Bezig met bomen (De Gooise Grafici), Kasteel Groeneveld, Baarn (NL)
- Land in Zicht, Sonsbeek Art & Design, Arnhem (NL)
- Lithography 99, Edinburgh Printmakers, Edinburgh (GB)
- Salon des Graphiques, Curwen Gallery, London (GB)
- 2nd International Print Triennial, Old City Hall, Prague (CZ)
- 200 Jahre Lithographie, Notre Dame de Sacre Coeur, Eichstätt (D)
- Far Out, Royal Museum of Fine Arts, Copenhagen (DK)
