= St. Luke Passion =

St. Luke Passion is a common English title referring to the passage in the Gospel of Luke describing the suffering and death of Jesus. The title often refers to compositions which have set all or some of the words of these passages to music.

St. Luke Passion may refer to:

- Lukas-Passion SWV 480 Heinrich Schütz
- St. Luke Passion (Bach), copied by Bach but not by Bach
- Lukas-Passion, several settings by Georg Philipp Telemann
- Lukas-Passion, five settings among Passions (C. P. E. Bach) 1771, 1775, 1779, 1783, 1787
- Lukas-Passion, Rudolf Mauersberger 1947
- St Luke Passion (Penderecki)
- St Luke Passion, James MacMillan
- St Luke Passion, Eriks Esenvalds
