= Bernard Hebb =

Bernard Hebb (born 1941 in Massachusetts, United States) is a classical guitarist and professor of classical guitar.

== Resumé ==
Hebb began his guitar studies in Massachusetts by Francis LaPierre. He continued his studies in Vienna Austria with Professor Karl Scheit, completing his education in 1969, at which time he received his Soloists-Diploma in Guitar (Master's degree).

For many years Bernard Hebb was instructor of Guitar at the Hamburg and Bremer Conservatories of Music in Germany. In 1980 he was appointed Professor of Guitar at the University of the Arts (Hochschule für Künste) in Bremen, where he was significant in establishing the guitar department. Among the many students that studied with him were: Professor Bernd Ahlert, Katja Bergström, Ulrich Busch, Reed Desrosiers, Duo Stoyanova, Oliver Eidam, Boyan Karandjuloff, Ulf Kröger, Dušan Oravec, Ki-Bum Park, Uwe Raschen, Leandro Riva and Ralf Winkelmann.

He is one of the founding members of the Zevener Guitar Week (Zevener Gitarrenwoche) and a jury member at international guitar festivals, where he also gives master classes. He compliments his pedagogical activities by giving recitals, which have taken him to the US, Australia and many other countries, including the European continent. Hebb has concertized as a soloist and has also performed, for example, in chamber music combinations with guitar, harpsichord, flute and violoncello.

For his merits he has been, among others, acknowledged with the 1973 Gold Medal of Honor from the "Federation of Worker's Music Association" of Austria (VAMÖ), the Pakhus Prize from the "Århus Art Academy", Denmark (2002), the Silver Medal (2005) from the city of Zeven and he has been included in Who's Who in the World (USA) since 2006.

== Partial Discography ==
- Music for Oboe and Guitar (Musik für Oboe und Gitarre), Helmut Schaarschmidt, Oboe and Bernard Hebb, 1983 LP/1889 CD.
- Oboe Sonatas of the Italien Broque (Oboen-Sonaten des italienischen Barock), Helmut Schaarschmidt, Oboe, Gunter Ribke, violoncello and Bernard Hebb, 1987.
- Romance, Gunter Ribke, Violoncello and Bernard Hebb, 1991.
- Encores for Oboe and Guitar (Encores für Oboe und Gitarre), 1992.
- Guitar Impressions, Music for two Guitars, Finn Svit und Bernard Hebb. 2001.
- Twilight, Music for Two Guitars, Gabriel Guillén and Bernard Hebb, 2007.
- Dedications, Modern solo guitar styles, Bernard Hebb, 2008.
- Over the Years, Bernard Hebb performs with his students, 2013.

== Literature ==
Bernard Hebb: Over the Years - A Journey in Time, Acoustic Music Books, Wilhelmshaven 2016, ISBN 978-3-86947-526-4
