= EuropaChorAkademie =

- Choir
- Origin: Bremen; Mainz
- Founded: 1997
- Genre: Mixed choir
- Chief conductor: Joshard Daus
- Awards: Preis der deutschen Schallplattenkritik; Midem Classical
- Website: www.europachorakademie.de

The EuropaChorAkademie (European Choir Academy) is a German mixed choir, founded by Joshard Daus in 1997 as a group formed by students of two music universities, the University of Mainz and the University of the Arts Bremen. They have performed internationally and recorded choral works including Mahler's Second Symphony and Schönberg's Moses und Aron.

== History ==
EuropaChorAkademie was founded in 1997 by the conductor Joshard Daus as a choir for concerts and recordings, formed by young professionals, students of two music universities, the University of Mainz and the University of the Arts Bremen. Young singers from Europe, Latin America and Asia collaborate on projects for concerts and CD recordings.

The first project was in Mahler's Second Symphony, with Michael Gielen and the SWR Sinfonieorchester Baden-Baden und Freiburg. The first tour was in 1998 to Greece, conducted by Gerd Albrecht. The same year, they performed and recorded Roméo et Juliette by Berlioz with the SWR Sinfonieorchester conducted by Sylvain Cambreling. A reviewer noted their positive contribution and found their "ghostly, emaciated, hushed singing" in Part III impressive. In 1999, Daus conducted a tour to Spain, performing Bach's St John Passion. The same year, the choir performed in the US premiere of Bernd Alois Zimmermann's Requiem für einen jungen Dichter (Requiem for a Young Poet) at Carnegie Hall in New York City.

The choir appeared in 2000 for the first time at the Aix-en-Provence Festival in a production of Janáček's Die Sache Makropulos conducted by Simon Rattle. They performed Zimmermann's Requiem für einen jungen Dichter at the 2003 Lucerne Festival, conducted by Ingo Metzmacher. In 2004 the group sang at the Easter Festival in Lucerne in the Requiem by Hector Berlioz. The same year, they performed Britten's War Requiem in the Mainz Cathedral with the Nordwestdeutsche Philharmonie. In 2007 the choir sang, again with the Nordwestdeutsche Philharmonie, Poulenc's Stabat Mater and Bruckners Mass No. 3 in F minor, including at the Berliner Philharmonie. They participated in the premiere of Krzysztof Penderecki's revised Symphony No. 8 at the opening concert of the 2008 Beijing Music Festival, conducted by the composer.

EuropaChorAkademie collaborated with Vladimir Jurowski and the London Philharmonic Orchestra in opera productions of the Baden-Baden Festival including Wagner's Lohengrin and Korngold's Das Wunder der Heliane in 2008.

EuropaChorAkademie was awarded the Preis der deutschen Schallplattenkritik 2009 and in 2010 the Midem Classical for their recording of Requiem für einen jungen Dichter, with soloists, the Czech Philharmonic Choir Brno, the Slovak Philharmonic Choir, the Eric Vloeimans Quintet and the Holland Symfonia, conducted by Bernhard Kontarsky for the label Cybele. They recorded in 2014 Schönberg's unfinished opera Moses und Aron with Franz Grundheber as Moses, Andreas Conrad as Aron, and the SWR Sinfonieorchester conducted by Cambreling. A review noted that the choir was highly expressive (hochexpressiv) in its important dramatic function where the choir is not a commentator as in ancient Greek drama, but an actor (dramatischer Handlungsträger). The recording was nominated for the Grammy of 2015 in the category Best Opera Recording.

== Selected recordings ==
- 1998: Mendelssohn Paulus / Daus / Bach-Ensemble der EuropaChorAkademie / SWR Sinfonieorchester
- 1999: Bach Mass in B minor / Daus / Bach-Ensemble der EuropaChorAkademie / Münchner Symphoniker
- 2000: Bach: St John Passion / Daus / Bach-Ensemble der EuropaChorAkademie
- 2001: Berlioz Roméo et Juliette / Cambreling / SWR Sinfonieorchester
- 2004: Mahler Symphony No. 8 / Gielen / SWR Sinfonieorchester
- 2008: Debussy Le Martyre de saint Sébastien / Cambreling, Grant Murphy, Pecková, Stutzmann, Lyssewski
- 2008: Haydn Missa in angustiis / Gielen, Lind, Danz, Taylor, Hagen
- 2008: Berlioz L'enfance du Christ / Cambreling, Henschel, Beuron, Rouillon, Brenz, Martin-Bonnet
- 2008: Schumann Das Paradies und die Peri / Cambreling, Kringelborn, Jansen, Pecková, Homberger, Karasiak, Braun
- 2009: Verdi Messa da Requiem / Plácido Domingo, Gallardo-Domas, Brillembourg, Berti, Abrazákow
- 2009: Berlioz Grande Messe des Morts / Cambreling, Groves
- 2009: Zimmermann Requiem für einen jungen Dichter / Kontarsky
- 2010: Liszt Christus / Daus, Kostenko, Brillembourg, Dewald, Salter
- 2011: Bach Mass in B minor / Daus, Wilsberg Lund, Brillembourg, Süß, Nolte
- 2012: Orff Catulli Carmina / Cambreling
- 2012: Mozart Requiem / Daus
- 2012: Verdi Messa da Requiem / Cambreling
- 2012: Brahms Zigeunerlieder / Daus
- 2012: Poulenc Stabat Mater / Daus
- 2014: Schönberg Moses und Aron / Cambreling, SWR Sinfonieorchester.
