= If Music Be the Food of Love =

"If music be the food of love, play on" is the opening line from Twelfth Night

If Music Be the Food of Love may also refer to:

== Poetry ==
- "If music be the food of love", poem by Henry Heveningham, set to music by Henry Purcell

== Film and television ==
- Nedtur, a 1980 film released in English as If Music Be the Food of Love
- "If Music Be the Food of Love", an episode of the series All Creatures Great and Small (1978 TV series)
- "If Music Be the Food of Love", an episode of the series Dragon (TV series)
- "If Music Be the Food of Love", an episode of the series Shakespeare & Hathaway: Private Investigators

== Music ==
- If Music Be the Food of Love... Prepare for Indigestion, an album by Dave Dee, Dozy, Beaky, Mick & Tich
- "If Music Be the Food of Love", a song by Barenaked Ladies from the album As You Like It (Barenaked Ladies album)
- "If music be the food of love", a song by Henry Purcell
- "If Music Be the Food of Love", a song by Libby Larsen
- "If music be the food of love", a composition by Maximilian Marcoll
- "If Music Be the Food of Love", a song by Samantha Fox from the album Samantha Fox (album)
- If Music Be the Food of Love, an album by the University of Utah Singers

== Other uses ==
- "If Music be the Food of Love", a short story by Dave Freer

== See also ==
- Then Play On, an album by Fleetwood Mac
