= Boris Cepeda =

German-Ecuadorian Pianist and Diplomat

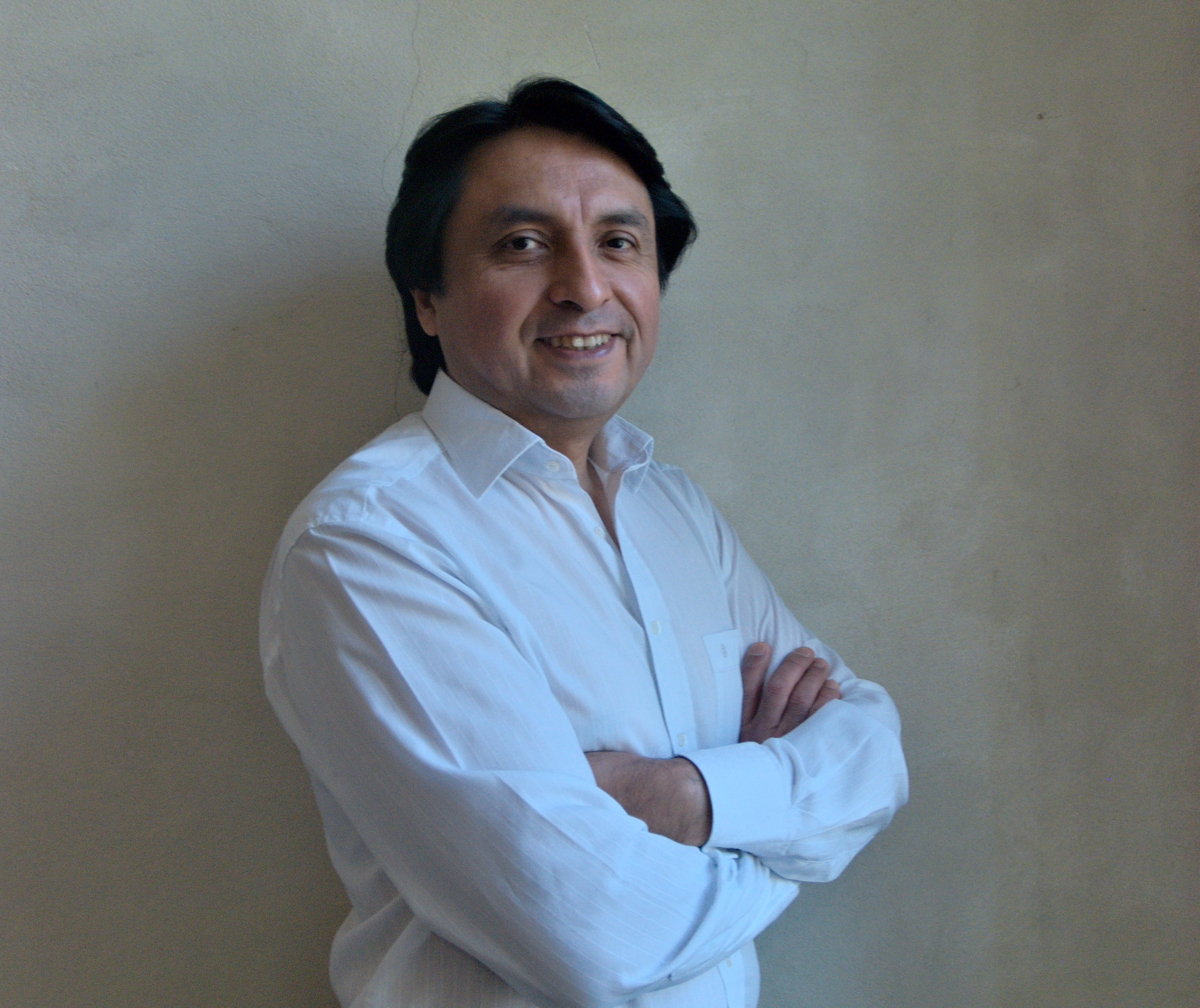
- Boris Cepeda portrait
- Born: 1974 (age 51–52); Quito, Ecuador
- Education: University of the Arts Bremen; University of Münster
- Occupations: Pianist; Conductor; Diplomat; Lecturer; Research associate
- Organizations: Theater Münster; Robert Schumann Hochschule
- Website: boriscepeda.com

Boris Cepeda (born 26 September 1974, in Quito) is a German-Ecuadorian Pianist and Diplomat.

== Biography ==
Boris Cepeda got his first piano lessons at four. He appeared in public for the first time in Ecuadorian television at five. Since then he has performed worldwide. Boris Cepeda studied at the University of the Arts Bremen in the class of Kurt Seibert. In 1999 he became assistant manager to the artistic director of the Festival Weidener Max-Reger-Tage From 2002 to 2007 he acted as Cultural attaché at the Embassy of Ecuador in Berlin. Since 2016 he is Head of Music at the Municipal Theater of Münster 2019 he was appointed lecturer for score reading at the Robert Schumann University of Music in Düsseldorf. 2023 he relocated to Atlanta, Georgia, under a visa for individuals with extraordinary abilities.

== Awards ==
2022 Fellowship for innovation in digital higher education teaching

2021 Steinway Artist
