= Klaus Kuhnke Archive for Popular Music =

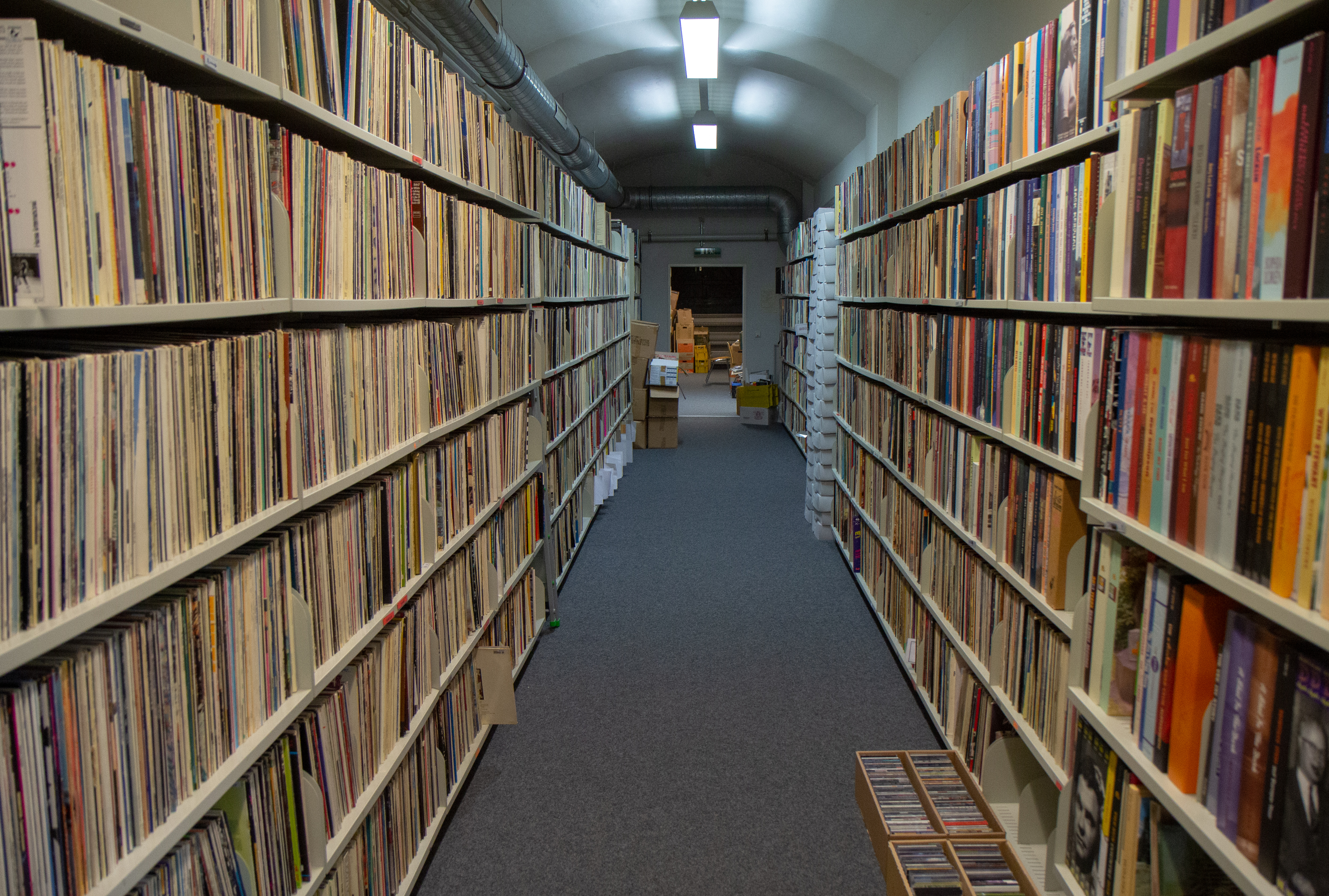
- Interactive map of Klaus Kuhnke Archive for Popular Music
- 53°4′25″N 8°48′33″E
- Location: Dechanatstr. 13–15, Bremen
- Established: 1975 (51 years ago)
- Director: Ulrich Duve
- Website: kkarchiv.de

The Klaus Kuhnke Archive for Popular Music is a music library for popular music in Bremen. It was founded in 1975 as a non-profit limited company and has been an affiliated institute at the University of the Arts Bremen since 1991.

== History ==
The Klaus Kuhnke Archive was founded in 1975 by the then-Radio Bremen editors Klaus Kuhnke, Manfred Miller and Peter Schulze as the Archiv für Populäre Musik GmbH. After the death of Klaus Kuhnke, the archive was renamed the Klaus Kuhnke Archive for Popular Music gemeinnützige GmbH. Richard Weize became Klaus Kuhnke's successor as shareholder in 1998. Head of the archive is Ulrich Duve. Since 1991, the archive has been housed in the building of the former old grammar school, which today houses the music department of the University of the Arts Bremen. The archive has officially become an affiliated institute of the university. The archive is a member of the IASA country group Germany/Switzerland.

== Content ==
- About 120,000 sound carriers (1000 shellac, 50,000 vinyl, 30,000 CD, cassettes, audio tapes)
- About 8,000 books (biographies, systematic books, encyclopaedias, discographies)
- over 160 periodicals (partly complete, partly on microfilm)
- about 1.100 DVDs
- about 700 VHS videos
- Reference library

== Photo views from the archive ==
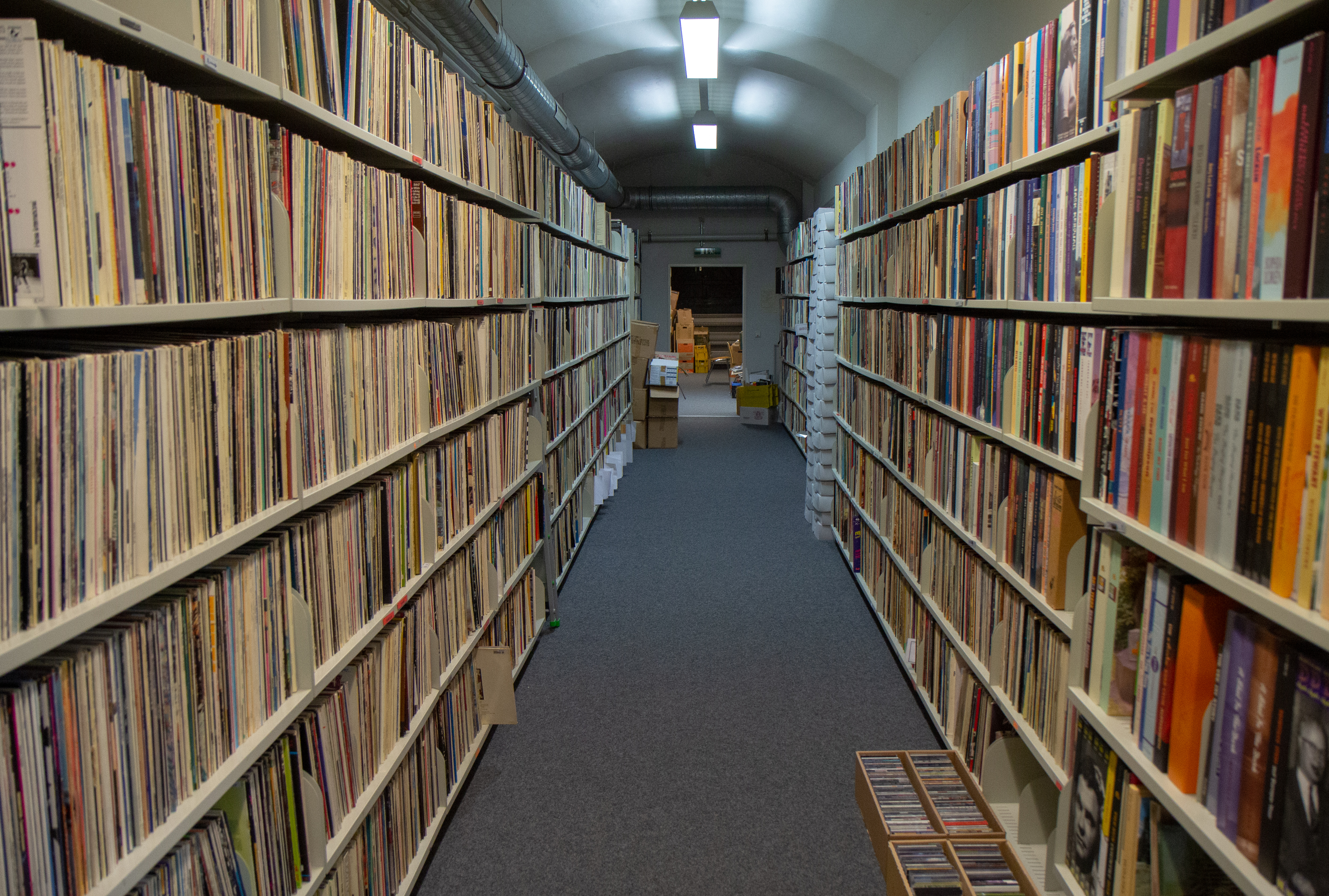

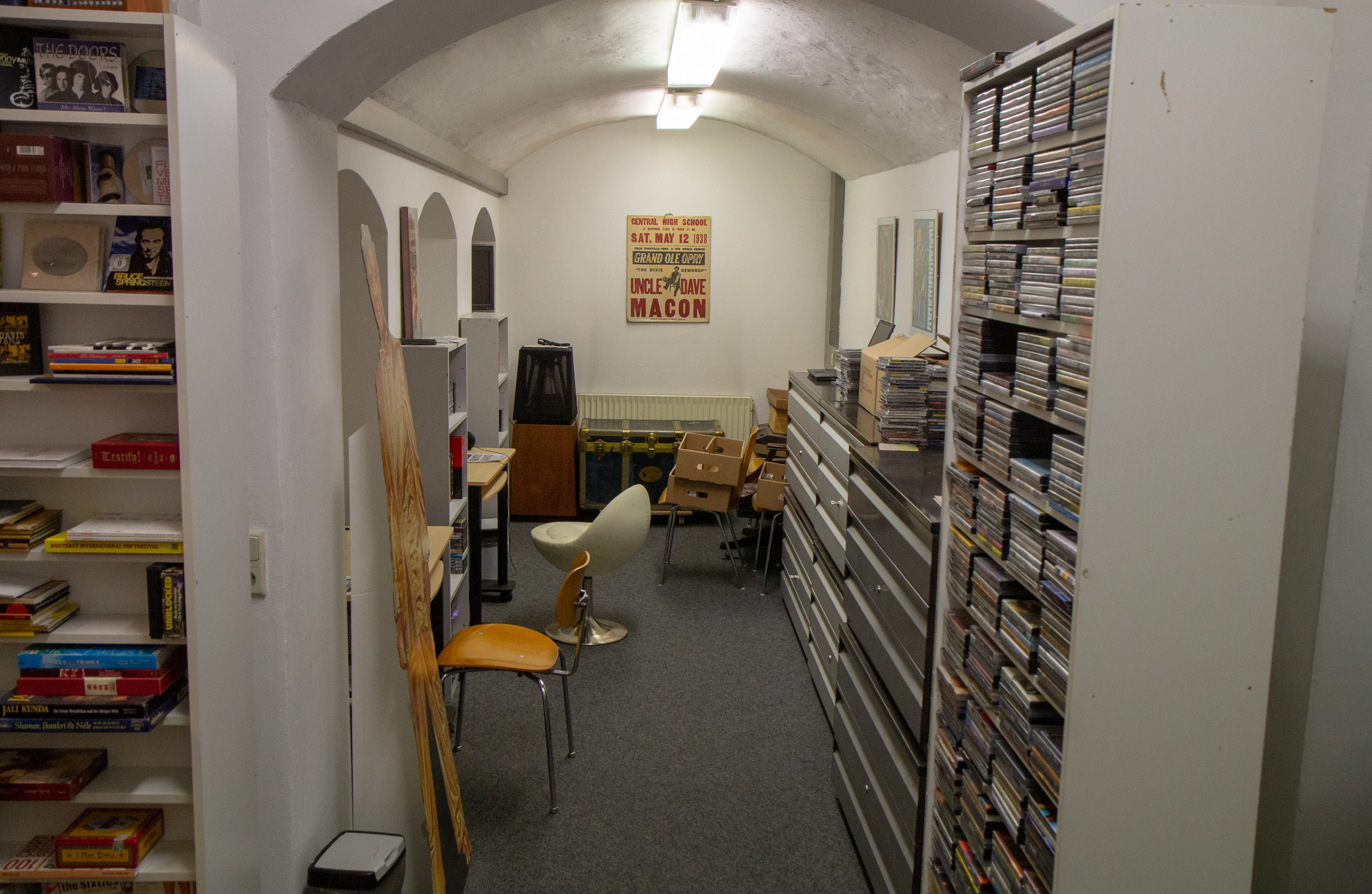

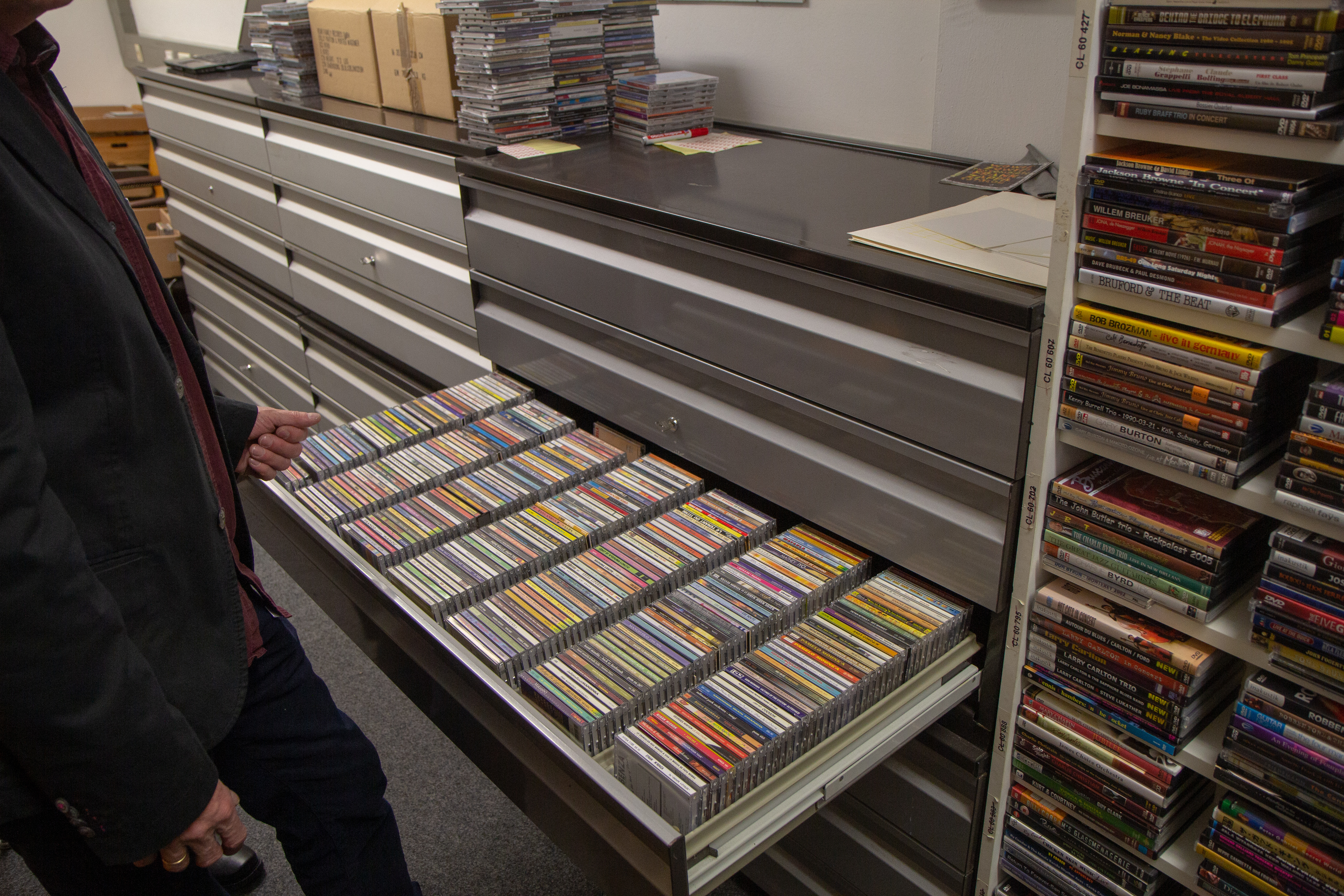

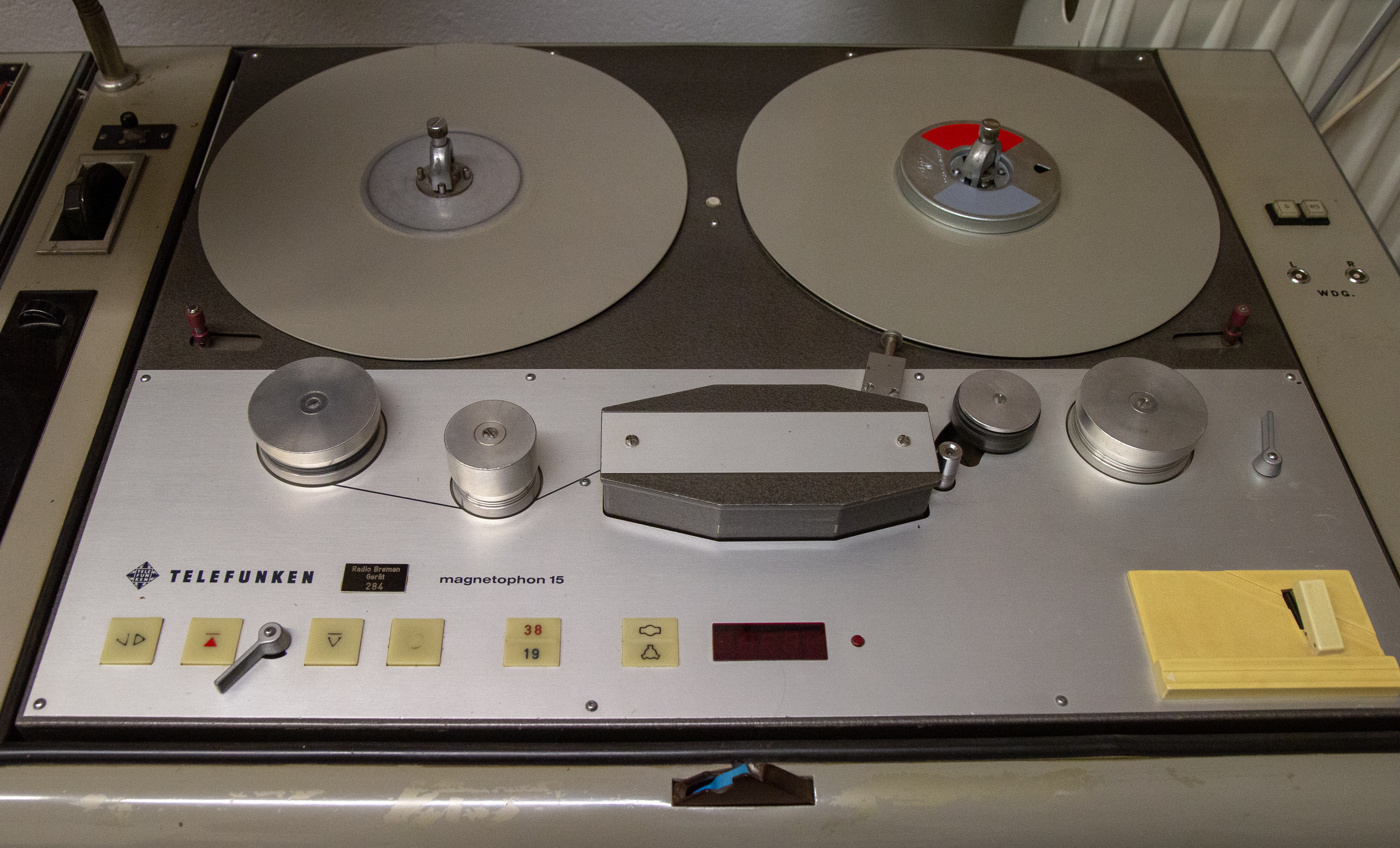

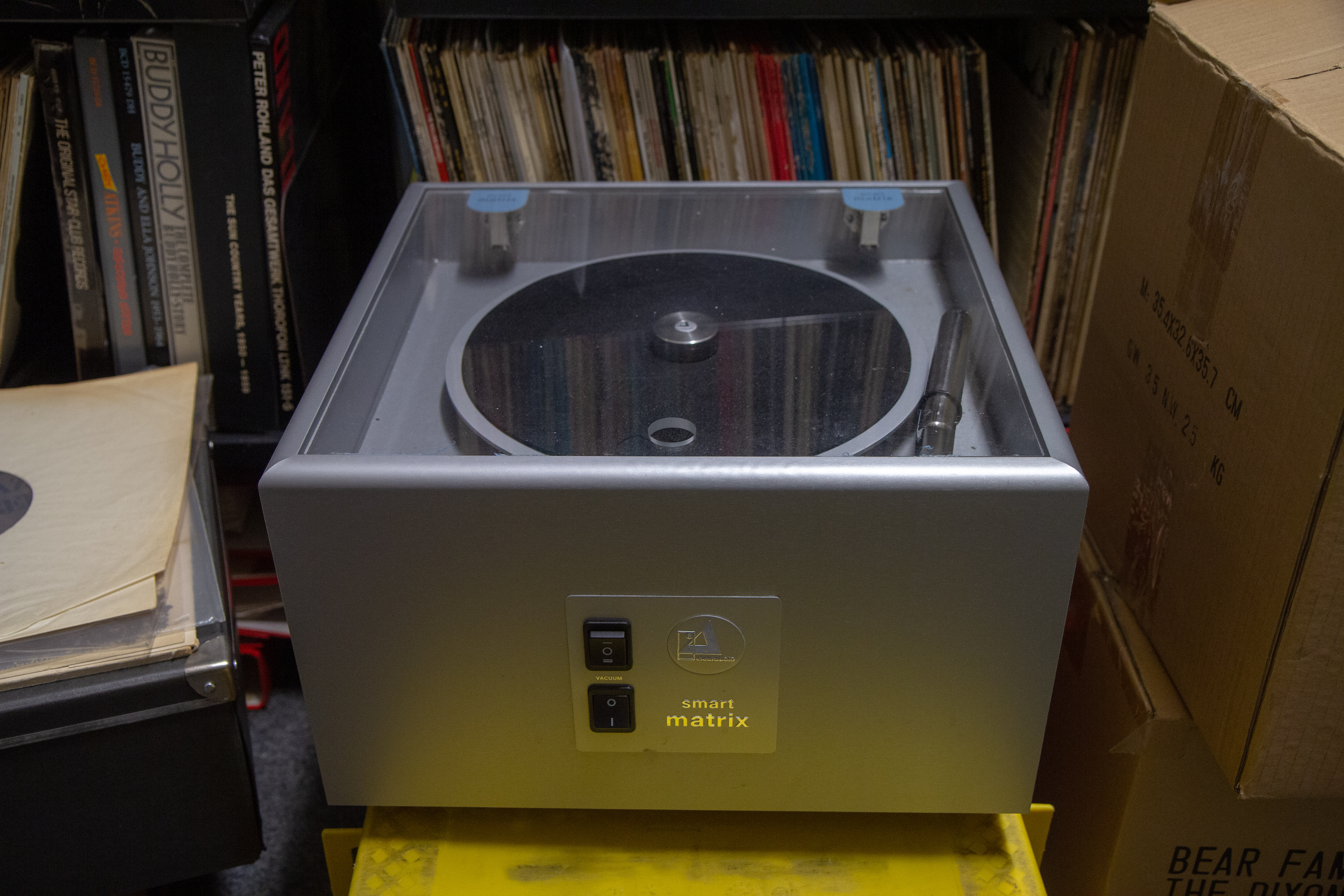

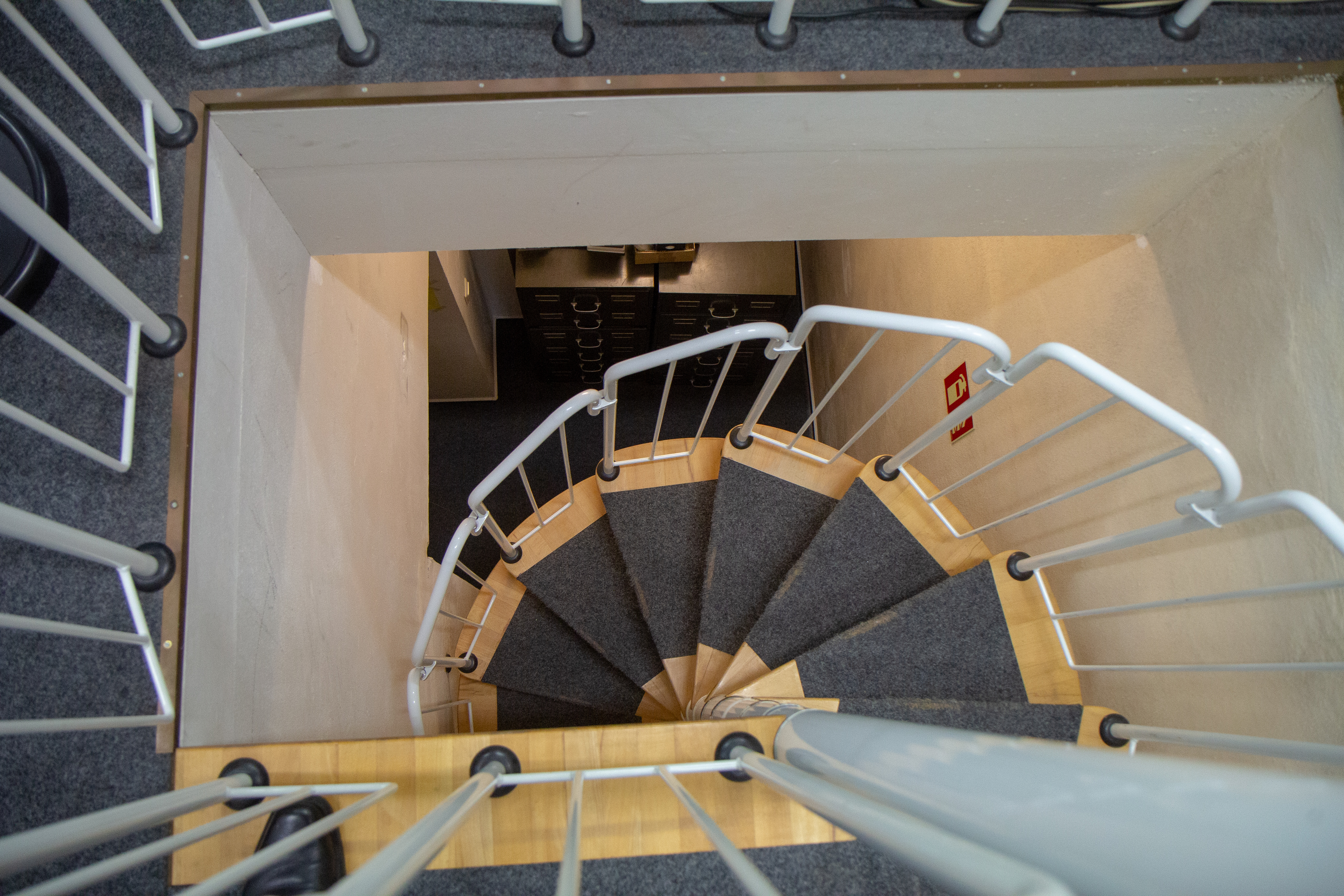
