= Esther Haase =

German photographer

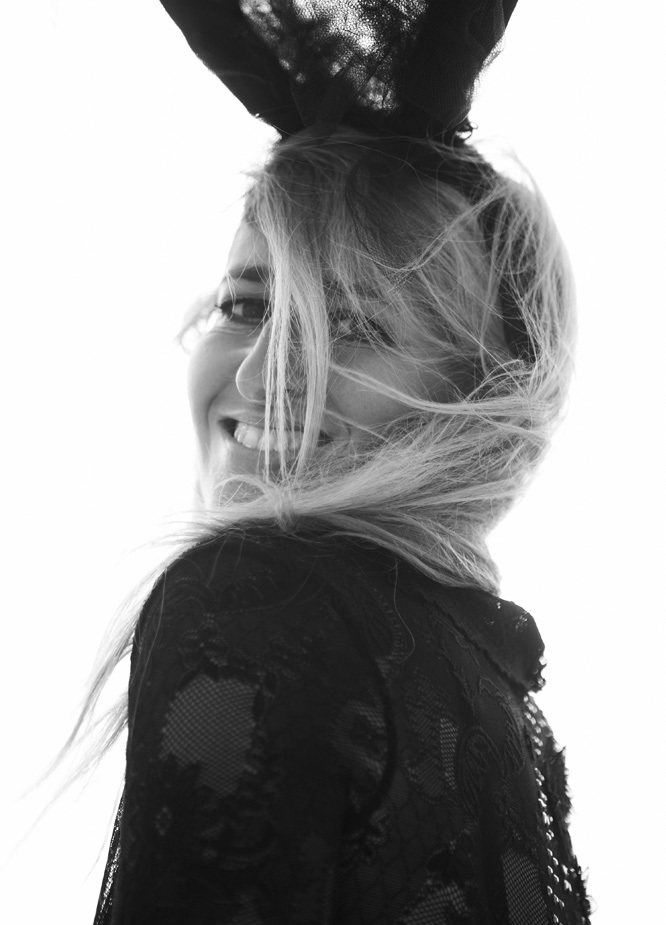
- Born: Bremen, West Germany
- Occupation: Photographer
- Years active: 1993–present
- Website: estherhaase.com

Esther Haase is a German photographer.

== Biography ==
Haase was born in Bremen, the first daughter of illustrator Sibylle Haase-Knels and Fritz Haase. Her father worked as a professor of communication design at the University of the Arts Bremen. In 1963 her parents founded a studio for design.

Haase spent her childhood in Bremen. After professional training in modern dance in Cologne, she spent two years (1986–1989) on-stage, joining the dance group of the Goethe Theatre, Bremen. From 1988 to 1993, she studied graphic design with a focus on photography at the University of the Arts Bremen.

== Work ==
Whilst studying at the University of the Arts, Haase was trainee at the art department of Men's Vogue in Munich. After graduation she moved to Berlin and started working internationally as a freelance photographer. She has shot fashion stories and editorials for Elle, Vanity Fair, Madame Figaro, Vogue India. She has made portraits of various Germans, international celebrities, fashion designers, and musicians; worked for fashion brands; and did advertising and campaign photography.

== Books ==
- Fashion in Motion. Thalwil/Zürich: Stemmle, 2000. Edited by Wolfgang Behnken, ISBN 978-3-908163-18-3. With texts by Wolfgang Behnken and Roberta Armani.
- Sexy Book. Zurich: Scalo, 2006. ISBN 978-3-03939-035-9.
- Famous. 2007.
- Esther Haase: Fotografien 1997–2006. Bremen: Hachmann, 2007. ISBN 978-3-939429-20-3.
- Short Stories. 2009.
- Rock'n Old. Heidelberg: Kehrer, 2010. ISBN 978-3-86828-109-5.
- Amazonen: das Brustkrebsprojekt von Uta Melle. Heidelberg: Kehrer, 2011. Edited by Nadine Barth. Photographs by Haase, Beate Wedekind, Sophie Albers, Jackie Hardt. ISBN 978-3-86828-209-2.
- Short Stories II. 2013.
