= WDR Rundfunkchor Köln =

Choir of Westdeutscher Rundfunk (WDR) in Cologne, Germany

- Choir
- Logo of the choir
- Origin: Cologne, Germany
- Founded: 1947
- Genre: Professional mixed choir
- Members: 43
- Chief conductor: Nicolas Fink (Chefdirigent); Simon Halsey (Kreativdirektor)
- Awards: Echo Klassik
- Website: www1.wdr.de/orchester-und-chor/rundfunkchor/

The WDR Rundfunkchor Köln (West German Radio Choir Cologne) is the choir of the German broadcaster Westdeutscher Rundfunk (WDR), based in Cologne. It was founded in 1947. The choir premiered works by contemporary composers including Arnold Schoenberg's unfinished opera Moses und Aron in 1954, Karlheinz Stockhausen's Momente, Luigi Nono's Il canto sospeso, Bernd Alois Zimmermann's Requiem für einen jungen Dichter and Penderecki's St Luke Passion.

== History ==
A forerunner was a chamber choir, "Kammerchor des Kölner Senders", founded in 1927 for the "Reichssender Köln" that was dissolved in 1940. WDR Rundfunkchor Köln was founded in Cologne as Kölner Rundfunkchor (Cologne Radio Choir) in 1947. The first rehearsal was on 1 September in the hall of the church St. Agnes. Bernhard Zimmermann rehearsed Mozart's Ave verum corpus. The choir was at first the Cologne choir of the broadcaster Nordwestdeutscher Rundfunk (NWDR), while the Hamburg choir was the NWDR Chor. When the broadcaster split in 1956 into NDR and WDR, the Kölner Rundfunkchor became the choir of the Westdeutscher Rundfunk.

== Program ==
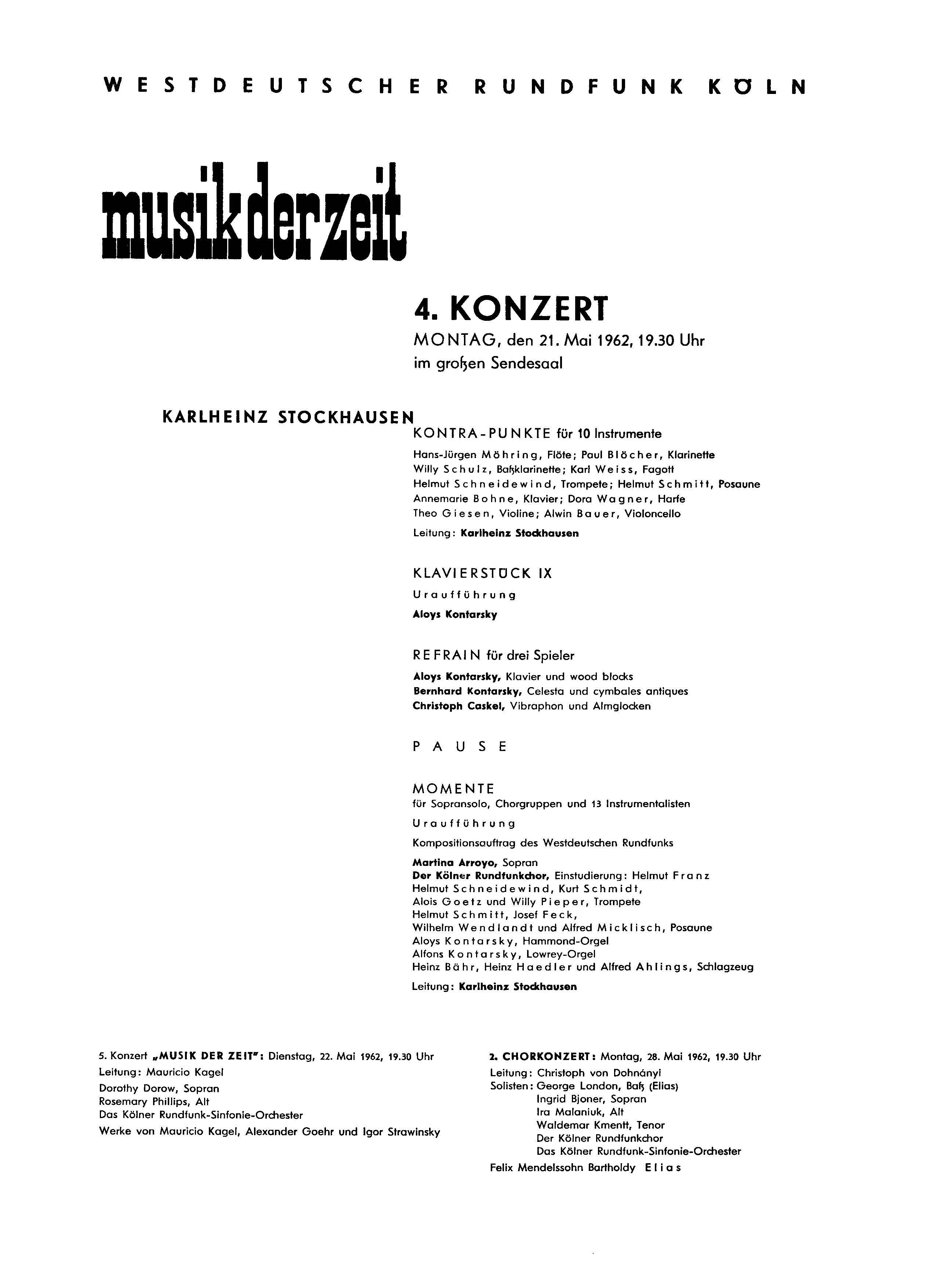
Poster for the premiere of Stockhausen's Momente on 21 May 1962

The choir of 45 singers has a repertory of medieval music to contemporary music, sacred music, oratorio, operetta, and music of computer games and film. The regularly perform cantatas and a cappella works in churches of the region. A series Musik am Mittag (Music at noon) in the Minoritenkirche invites the audience to participate.

The choir has been focused on contemporary music and has performed more than 150 premieres of new works, several of them commissioned by the WDR. The choir took part in pioneering projects, such as the concert premiere of Arnold Schoenberg's unfinished opera Moses und Aron in 1954. Karlheinz Stockhausen conducted in 1962 the first performance of his cantata Momente for soprano, four mixed choirs, and thirteen instrumentalists (four trumpets, four trombones, three percussionists, and two electric keyboards). Other premieres included Hans Werner Henze Laudes, Luigi Nono's Il canto sospeso, Pierre Boulez' Le Visage nuptial, Bernd Alois Zimmermann's Requiem für einen jungen Dichter, Penderecki's St Luke Passion, Iannis Xenakis' Nuits, Luciano Berio's Coro, York Höller's Der ewige Tag, Péter Eötvös' IMA and Toshio Hosokawa's Die Lotosblume. The choir has performed internationally, for example in 2013 in Mahler's Second Symphony with choir and orchestra of the Bayerischer Rundfunk conducted by Mariss Jansons at the Salzburg Festival, the Lucerne Festival and The Proms. In Oktober 2013 the choir performed Schoenberg's Gurre-Lieder with the Rundfunkchor Berlin and the Berlin Philharmonic conducted by Sir Simon Rattle.

In 2012, the WDR Rundfunkchor Köln was awarded the Echo Klassik in the category best choral recording for György Ligeti's Requiem.

== Choral directors ==
In its history, the choir had several chief conductors (Chefdirigent). Later the position of choral conductor (Chorleiter) was distinguished. They have been:

- 1947–1962: Bernhard Zimmermann (previously held the same position in the choir of the original Westdeutsche Funkstunde, 1927–1933)
- 1962–1989: Herbert Schernus
- 1992–1998: Helmuth Froschauer
- 2001–2004: Anton Marik
- 2004–2011: Rupert Huber
- 2014–2020: Stefan Parkman
- from 2020: Nicolas Fink

== Recordings ==
- Mendelssohn: Lobgesang, Andrew Manze, Anna Lucia Richter, Esther Dierkes, Robin Tritschler, NDR Radiophilharmonie, WDR Rundfunkchor Köln. Pentatone PTC 5186639 (2018)
- Maurice Ravel: Daphnis et Chloé, conducted by Gustavo Gimeno, 2017 (PENTATONE – PTC 5186652)
- Eduard Künneke: Die lockende Flamme, conducted by Peter Falk, 1994 (Capriccio – C5088)
- Oscar Straus: Die lustigen Nibelungen, conducted by Siegfried Köhler. (Capriccio – C10753)
- Weill: Der Kuhhandel conducted by Jan Latham-Koenig, 1992 (Capriccio – C60013-1)

== See also ==
- Studio for Electronic Music (WDR)
- WDR Symphony Orchestra Cologne (WDR Sinfonieorchester Köln)
- WDR Funkhausorchester
- WDR Big Band
