= Bernd Alois Zimmermann =

German composer (1918–1970)

- Born: 20 March 1918; Bliesheim, German Empire
- Died: 10 August 1970 (aged 52); Königsdorf, West Germany
- Occupations: Composer; academic teacher
- Organizations: Musikhochschule Köln

Bernd Alois Zimmermann (20 March 1918 – 10 August 1970) was a German composer. He is perhaps best known for his opera Die Soldaten, which is regarded as one of the most important German operas of the 20th century, after those of Berg. His eclectic music, which employs a wide range of techniques including dodecaphony and musical quotation, encompasses the styles of the avant-garde, serial, and postmodern.

== Life ==
Zimmermann was born in Bliesheim (now part of Erftstadt), near Cologne. He grew up in a rural Catholic community in western Germany. His father worked for the German Reichsbahn and was also a farmer. In 1929, Zimmermann began attending a private Catholic school, where he had his first real encounter with music. After the NSDAP closed all private schools, he switched to a public Catholic school in Cologne where, in 1937, he received his Abitur.

That same year he fulfilled his duty for the Reichsarbeitsdienst and spent late 1937–early 1938 studying pedagogy at the Hochschule für Lehrerausbildung (lit. University for Teacher Training) in Bonn.

He began studying music education, musicology, and composition in early 1938 at the University for Music in Cologne. In 1940, he was drafted into the Wehrmacht, but was released in 1942 due to a severe skin illness. He returned to his studies, but did not obtain a degree until 1947 due to the ending of the war. By then he had already become a free-lance composer in 1946, mainly for radio. During 1948–1950, he was a participant in the Darmstädter Ferienkurse where he studied with René Leibowitz and Wolfgang Fortner, among others.

In 1957, he received a scholarship to spend time at the German Academy at Villa Massimo in Rome. He also assumed the position of Professor of Composition (from Frank Martin) as well as Film and Broadcast Music at the Musikhochschule Köln. Among Zimmermann's notable students was Clarence Barlow. In the 1960s, he earned more success as a composer, including a second scholarship to the Villa Massimo in 1963, and a fellowship in the Academy of Arts, Berlin); especially after his opera Die Soldaten premiered in 1965. The opera had previously not been performed due to the enormous number of performers required and its difficulty. The Cologne Opera had deemed it "unplayable". The composer's depression led to an emotional crisis, which was compounded by a quickly deteriorating eye problem. On 10 August 1970, Zimmermann committed suicide at his home in Königsdorf near Cologne, five days after completing the score of his last composition, Ich wandte mich um und sah an alles Unrecht, das geschah unter der Sonne (often translated as "...The Turning" in English). At the time, he had been preparing another opera, Medea, after Hans Henny Jahnn.

== Music ==
In his own compositional growth, he took his place in the progression of new music, from which the German composers were mostly separated during the Nazi regime. He began writing works in the neoclassical style, continued with free atonality and twelve-tone music and eventually arrived at serialism (in 1956). His affection for jazz can sometimes be heard in some of his compositions (more so in his Violin Concerto or Trumpet Concerto).

In contrast to the so-called Darmstadt School (Stockhausen, Boulez, Nono, etc.), Zimmermann did not make a radical break with tradition. At the end of the 1950s, he developed his own personal compositional style, the pluralistic "Klangkomposition" (German word referring to the compositional style that focuses on planes – or areas – of sound and tone-colors). The combination and overlapping of layers of musical material from various time periods (from Medieval to Baroque and Classical to Jazz and Pop music) using advanced musical techniques is characteristic of Klangkomposition. Zimmermann's use of this technique ranged from the embedding of individual musical quotes (seen somewhat in his orchestral work Photoptosis) to pieces that are built entirely as a collage (the ballet Musique pour les soupers du Roi Ubu). In his vocal works, especially his Requiem für einen jungen Dichter, the text is used to progress the piece by overlapping texts from various sources. He created his own musical stance using the metaphor "the spherical form of time".

== Works ==
- Extemporale for piano (1946)
- Capriccio for Piano
- Lob der Torheit (burlesque cantata by Goethe), for solo, choir and large orchestra (1947)
- Enchiridion I for piano (1949)
- Märchensuite for orchestra (1950)
- Alagoana (Caprichos Brasileiros) Ballet Suite (1950)
- Rheinische Kirmestänze (1950, rearranged in 1962 for 13 wind instruments)
- Concert for Violin and orchestra (1950)
- Sonata for solo violin (1951)
- Symphony in one movement (1951, revised 1953)
- Enchiridion II for piano (1951)
- Concerto for oboe and chamber orchestra (1952)
- Des Menschen Unterhaltsprozeß gegen Gott (lit. The People's Maintenance Suit Against God) Radio opera in three acts with text from Pedro Calderón de la Barca and adapted by Matthias Bungart.
- Nobody knows the trouble I see Concert for trumpet and chamber orchestra (1954)
- Sonata for Viola solo (1955)
- Konfigurationen (Configurations) for piano (1956)
- Perspektiven — Musik für ein imaginäres Ballet (Perspectives — Music for an imaginary ballet.) for 2 pianos (1956)
- "Die fromme Helene" after Wilhelm Busch sounded as a "Rondo popolare" for narrator and *instrumental ensemble (1957)
- Canto di speranza Cantata for cello and small orchestra (1957)
- Omnia tempus habent Cantata for soprano and 17 instruments (1957)
- Impromptu for orchestra (1958)
- Dialoge Concerto for two pianos and orchestra (1960)
  - Re-written with the title Monologue for two pianos (1964)
- Sonata for solo cello (1960)
- Présence, ballet blanc for piano trio and narrator (with words from Paul Pörtner) (1961)
- Antiphonen for viola and 25 instrumentalists (1961)
- Tempus Loquendi for solo flute (1963)
- Un "petit rien" (1964) for ensemble, after Les Oiseaux de lune by Marcel Aymé
- Musique pour les soupers du Roi Ubu (Ballet noir en sept parties et une entrée) Ballet after "Ubu Roi" by Alfred Jarry (1966)
- Die Soldaten Opera in four acts, libretto by the composer after the drama of the same name by Jakob Michael Reinhold Lenz (1965)
- Concerto for Cello and Orchestra en forme de pas de trois (1966), dedicated to Siegfried Palm
- Tratto Electronic composition (1967)
- Intercomunicazione for cello and piano (1967)
- Die Befristeten for jazz quintet (1967)
- Photoptosis Prelude for large orchestra (1968)
- Requiem für einen jungen Dichter — Lingual for narrator, soprano, baritone, three choirs, electric tape, orchestra, jazz combo and organ (1969)
- Vier kurze Studien for solo cello (1970)
- Stille und Umkehr orchestra sketches (1970)
- Tratto 2 Electronic composition (1970)
- Ich wandte mich um und sah an alles Unrecht, das geschah unter der Sonne. "Ekklesiastische Aktion" for two narrators, bass and orchestra (1970)
- Plus various compositions for radio, theater and film
