= Mária Gyurkovics =

Hungarian soprano (1915–1973)

Mária Gyurkovics

Mária Gyurkovics (19 June 1915 – 28 October 1973) was a Hungarian soprano.

== Biography ==
Mária Gyurkovics was born in Budapest, Hungary on 19 June 1915. She was a student of Imre Molnár at the Budapest Academy of Music where she trained as a vocalist. She made her professional opera debut as Gilda in Verdi's Rigoletto at the Hungarian State Opera House in 1937. She remained a principal artist at that theatre for approximately the next 30 years; having a long career at that theatre as a leading coloratura soprano. She was awarded the Kossuth Prize in 1953.

In Budapest, Gyurkovics played an instrumental role in reviving an interest in the operas of Gaetano Donizetti which had long been neglected in the repertory; beginning with a production of Lucia di Lammermoor in which she performed the title role. Other Donizetti roles she performed included Adina in L'elisir d'amore and Norina in Don Pasquale. In 1952 she recorded the role of Lucia for broadcast on Hungarian radio. Other roles she sang at the Hungarian State Opera included Konstanze in Die Entführung aus dem Serail, Oscar in Un ballo in maschera, the Princess in Pongrác Kacsóh's János vitéz, the Queen of the Night in The Magic Flute, Rosina in The Barber of Seville, Sophie in Der Rosenkavalier, and the title roles in Lakmé, Lucia di Lammermoor and Martha. At the end of her career she took on the comic part of Miss Wordsworth in Britten's Albert Herring.

Outside of Budapest, Gyurkovics made guest appearances at the Berlin State Opera and the Semperoper in 1951. In 1953 she gave performances at the Bolshoi Theatre, the Mariinsky Theatre, and the Estonia Theatre. In 1957 she performed at the Vienna State Opera. She also made appearances on screen in a handful of Hungarian films, and lent her singing voice to other movies; dubbing her voice for other actresses who appeared on screen. Her final performance in an opera was at the Erkel Theatre in 1967, and she gave her final public concert in 1970.

Gyurkovics died in Budapest on 28 October 1973. Her husband was the conductor Miklós Forrai with whom she had two daughters. A statue of her created by Miklós Borsos stands in the Farkasréti Cemetery. An annual singing competition named for her was established in Budapest in 2003.
