= Passions (C. P. E. Bach) =

Passions by Carl Philipp Emanuel Bach

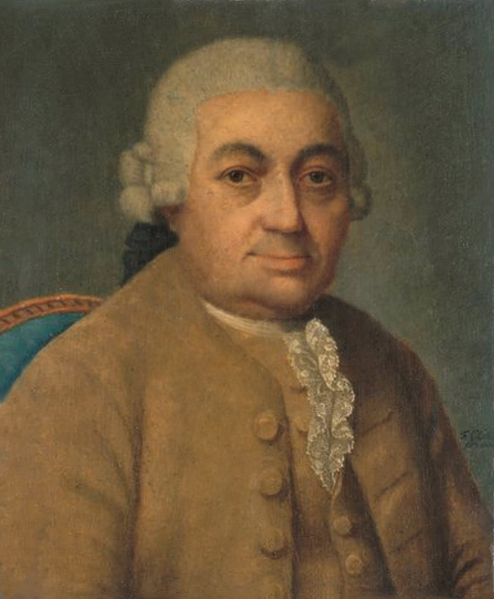
Portrait of Carl Philipp Emanuel Bach by Franz Conrad Löhr

As Kapellmeister at Hamburg from 1768 to 1788, Carl Philipp Emanuel Bach composed 21 settings of the Passion narrative and 1 Passion oratorio (the Passion Cantata Die letzten Leiden des Erlösers H. 776).

== History ==
The tradition of the German oratorio Passion began in Hamburg in 1643 with Thomas Selle’s St John Passion and continued unbroken until the death of Carl Philipp Emanuel Bach in 1788. The oratorio Passion, made famous by Johann Sebastian Bach in his St John Passion and St Matthew Passion, is the style that is most familiar to the modern listener. It makes use of recitative to tell the Passion narrative and initially intersperses reflective chorales but later arias and choruses as well.

This is in contrast to the Passion oratorio, a genre typified by the so-called Brockes-Passion text Der für die Sünden der Welt gemarterte und sterbende Jesus (set by Georg Philipp Telemann and George Frideric Handel, among others). The Passion oratorio does away with the vocal characterization used in the oratorio Passion and is more a free, poetic retelling of the narrative, rather than a direct quote from the Gospels. Bach himself made this distinction when he wrote to Georg Michael Telemann in 1767 to clarify his duties in Hamburg: "are [Passions] presented in the historic and old manner with the Evangelist and other persons, or is it arranged in the manner of an oratorio with reflections, as is the case in Ramler's oratorio [Der Tod Jesu, arguably the most famous setting of this text is by Carl Heinrich Graun]?" As the clergy in Hamburg were rather conservative, they preserved this "old-fashioned" style until the church music reform in 1789, after Bach's death.

== Bach's Passions ==
Each year while he was in Hamburg, Bach compiled a new Passion to be performed during Lent. The Gospel text to be used was chosen on a rotating cycle, as was the Hamburg tradition established in the late 17th century, in the order Matthew, Mark, Luke, and John. As they were performed in a regular Sunday service (not at a separate Vespers, as was the custom in Leipzig), Bach modeled his Passions on those of Telemann: they were roughly an hour long, and began in the Garden of Gethsemane and ended with the death of Jesus, rather than telling the contextualizing details as well. The biblical text was set in recitative and assigned to the appropriate characters (individual singers taking the roles of the Evangelist, Jesus, Peter, and so on). Reflective chorales and arias were inserted at predefined points in the narrative, providing commentary on the Passion events. The length was generally carefully kept within one hour.

The Passion for the year was performed five times during Lent, once in each church. They were performed starting in the oldest church and moving to the youngest church as follows: St. Peter, St. Nicholas, St. Catherine, St. James and St. Michael. The Passion librettos were printed each year for sale to the congregation; copies of these librettos survive to this day in the Hamburg Staatsarchiv. In addition to the chorale texts, the librettos also listed a corresponding number in the Hamburg Gesangbuch (Hymnal), strongly suggesting that the congregation participated in the chorale singing.

Out of all 21 Passions written in Hamburg, none is an entirely original work. Though Bach did borrow from himself, he more frequently borrowed from other composers. He often borrowed biblical material (usually turba choruses) from Telemann and J. S. Bach. For the arias and non-biblical choruses, he turned to the music of his contemporaries, most often Gottfried August Homilius, but also Georg Benda and Gottfried Heinrich Stölzel.

The Passions were never published in Bach's lifetime, and survive only in manuscript form. These materials, however, were lost after World War II and were only rediscovered in 1999. In 2001, they were returned to their home at the Sing-Akademie zu Berlin, where they remain to this day. They are currently being transcribed into modern, engraved editions by the Packard Humanities Institute. One exception seems to be the last of the passions, a keyboard reduction of which was published in the year of its premiere (1789).

== Works ==
The Passions themselves are as follows (year of performance given):

- Passion according to St. Matthew: 1769, 1773, 1777, 1781, 1785, 1789
- Passion according to St. Mark: 1770, 1774, 1778, 1782, 1786
- Passion according to St. Luke: 1771, 1775, 1779, 1783, 1787
- Passion according to St. John: 1772, 1776, 1780, 1784, 1788

== Recordings ==
- Markus-Passion H. 860 "Gehet heraus und schauet an", by Johann Georg Röllig, Helmut Rilling, conductor, Bach Collegium, Gächinger Kantorei, CBS 42511 (1987) (complete recording).
- Markus-Passion H. 860 "Gehet heraus und schauet an", by Johann Georg Röllig, Beat Raaflaub, Ad Fontes, Knabenkantorei Basel, ArsMusici (1994) (not a complete recording).
- Matthäus-Passion (1769), H. 782 "Christus, der uns selig macht", by C. P. E. Bach, Ton Koopman, conductor, Amsterdam Baroque Orchestra & Choir, Edition Alte Musik ORF 316 (2003).
- Johannes-Passion (1772), H. 785 "Erforsche mich, erfahr mein Herz", by C. P. E. Bach, Joshard Daus, conductor, Capriccio Basel, Zelter-Ensemble der Sing-Akademie zu Berlin, Capriccio Records C60 103 (2004).
- Lukas-Passion (1775) H. 788, "Herr starke mich dein Leiden", by C.P.E. Bach (arrangement of Homilius' Lukas-Passion, HoWV I.5) Paul Dombrecht, Il Fondamento, Harmonia Mundi IF1401 (2015).
- Matthäus-Passion (1781), H. 794, "Jesu, meiner Seelen Licht", by C. P. E. Bach, Karl-Friedrich Beringer, conductor, Deutsche Kammer-Virtuosen, Windsbacher Knabenchor, Rondeau 2027 (2004).
- Matthäus-Passion (1785), H. 798 "O Lamm Gottes, im Staube", by C. P. E. Bach, Joshard Daus, conductor, Zelter-Ensemble der Sing-Akademie zu Berlin, Capriccio Records C60 113 (2005).
- Markus-Passion (1786), H.799 "Ach großer König, groß zu allen Zeiten", by C. P. E. Bach, Joshard Daus, conductor, Mendelssohn Symphonia, Europa Chor Akademie, Capriccio Records C60 132 (2007).
- Lukas-Passion (1787) H. 800 “O Lamm Gottes unschuldig“, by C. P. E. Bach, Joshard Daus, conductor, Mendelssohn Symphonia, Europa Chor Akademie, Glor 8071 (2008).

== Bibliography ==
- Bach, Carl Philipp Emanuel (2006). Uwe Wolf (ed.). Passion according to St. Mark (1770). Los Altos, Calif.: Packard Humanities Institute. ISBN 978-1-933280-18-9. OCLC 77639949.
- Clark, Stephen Lewis (1984). The Occasional Choral Works of C. P. E. Bach (Ph.D. diss ed.). Princeton, NJ: Princeton University. OCLC 17340187.
- Leisinger, Ulrich (2001). "Bach, Carl Philipp Emanuel". In Sadie, Stanley; Tyrrell, John (eds.). The New Grove Dictionary of Music and Musicians (2nd ed.). London: Macmillan Publishers. ISBN 978-1-56159-239-5.
- Miesner, Heinrich (1929). Philipp Emanuel Bach in Hamburg. Leipzig: Breitkopf & Härtel. OCLC 1088311.
- Sanders, Reginald (2001). Carl Philipp Emanuel Bach and Liturgical Music at the Hamburg Principal Churches from 1768 to 1788 (Ph.D. diss ed.). New Haven, CT: Yale University. OCLC 51308493.
