= University of the Arts Bremen =

Art school in Bremen, Germany

- Hochschule für Künste Bremen
- Type: Public
- Established: 1873
- President: Prof. Roland Lambrette (interim)
- Location: Bremen, Free Hanseatic City of Bremen, Germany; 53°05′53″N 08°46′03″E
- Affiliations: ELIA, AEC
- Website: www.hfk-bremen.de/en/

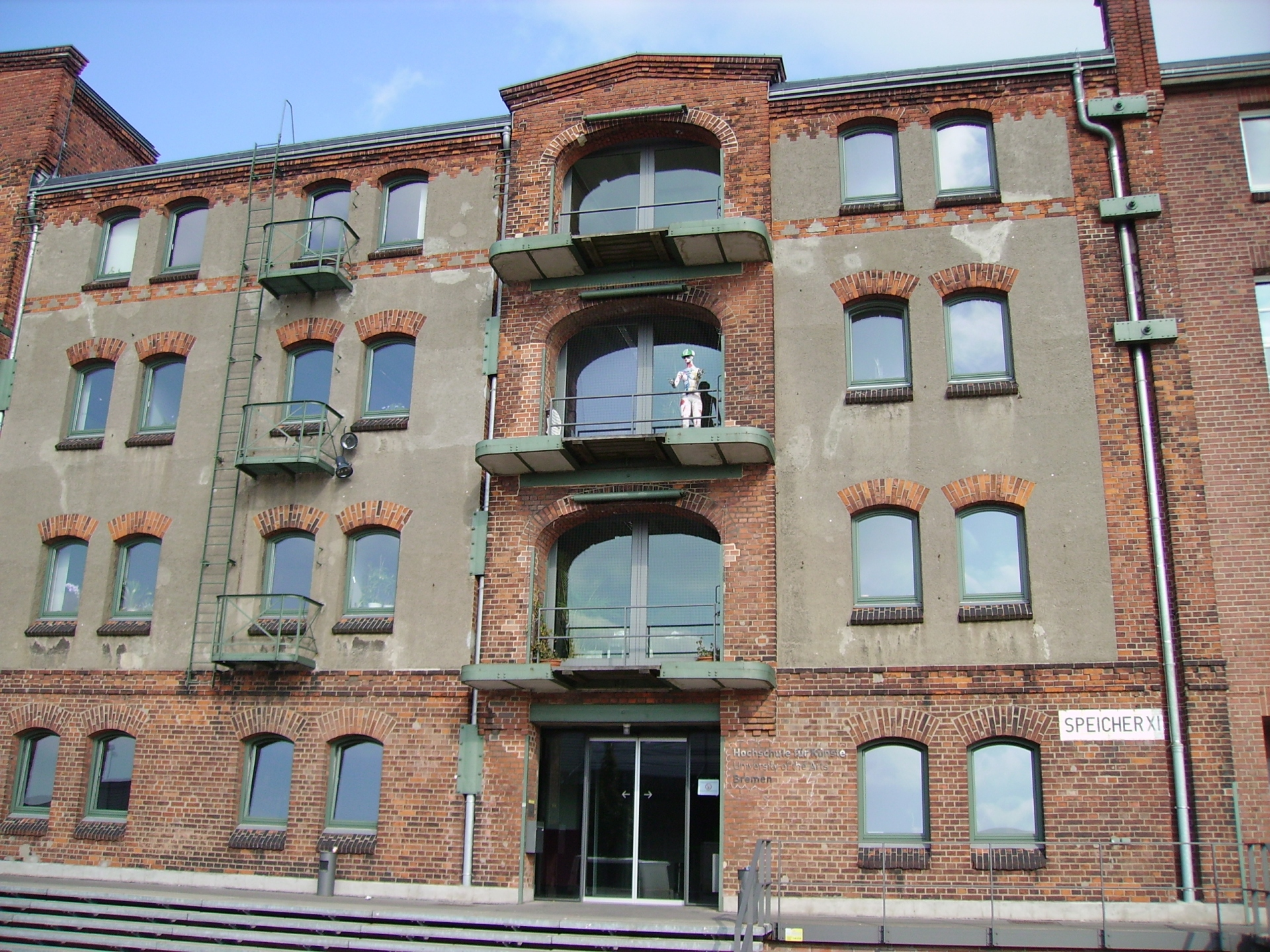
Speicher XI, fine arts and design faculty. Formerly docks of the Bremen Harbour.

The University of the Arts Bremen (German: Hochschule für Künste Bremen, HfK Bremen) is a public university in Bremen, Germany. It is one of the most successful arts institutions, and its origins date back to 1873. The University of the Arts Bremen runs a Faculty of Fine Arts and Design, and a Faculty of Music, with approximately 900 students, 65 professors and about 180 assistant professors.

The academic subdivisions within the University are Music, Art, Design and practical theory. The institution's specialisms in both music and visual arts is unique within Germany, save for the Berlin University of the Arts. Recent works and exhibitions combine visual art, digital media and music, with emphasis on co-operation between disciplines.

== History ==
In 1998, the institution celebrated the tenth anniversary of the University of the Arts and the 125th anniversary of the Art Academy.

Since 2003, the Fine Arts Faculty of the University of the Arts Bremen has been located at Speicher XI, in the former overseas harbour in the Überseestadt district. The Music Faculty is located at a second site on the Dechanatstraße in the city centre, close to the Rathaus and the Cathedral.

== Courses of studies ==
The following study programs are offered by the university:

=== Department of Fine Art and Design ===
Fine art, Diplom, classes

- sculpture
- film
- photography
- graphic design
- ceramics
- concept
- painting
- new media
- drawing

Design, Diplom, focus

- information design
- product design
- fashion design

Digital media, Bachelor/Master

- media studies

=== Department of Music ===
- Diplom and postgraduate studies in singing, early music, musical composition, music education, church music and training for music teachers.
- Advanced and further training courses for highly talented students from regular schools
- International EuropaChorAkademie, founded by Joshard Daus in 1997, in collaboration with the University of Mainz.

== Alumni ==
see also: Category:University of the Arts Bremen alumni

- Christian Dawid, clarinetist
- Esther Haase, photographer
- Dorothee Mields, soprano
- Nils Mönkemeyer, violist
- Barbara Stühlmeyer, writer, musicologist
- Ludger Stühlmeyer, cantor, composer, musicologist
- Erich Witte, stage actor, operatic tenor and opera director
- Boris Cepeda, pianist, conductor, diplomat

== Academic staff ==
- Klaus Bernbacher, German conductor, music event manager, broadcasting manager
- Hans Davidsson, Swedish organist and organ teacher
- Angelo Evelyn, Canadian artist
- Hans-Joachim Frey, theatre director, theatre manager and cultural manager
- Rudolf Kelber, organist, harpsichordist, conductor and church musician
- Maximilian Marcoll, composer and performer
- Thomas Mohr (tenor), tenor and academic teacher
- Hille Perl, viola da gamba player and teacher
- Stephen Stubbs, American lutenist and music director in the early music scene

== Literature ==
- Hesse, Hans: Bis zur Narbe. Eine Erzählung. Bremen 2011. Ed. by the University of the Arts Bremen. ISBN 978-3-00-033578-5.

== See also ==
- Klaus Kuhnke Archive for Popular Music
