= Maximilian Marcoll =

German composer and performer (born 1981)

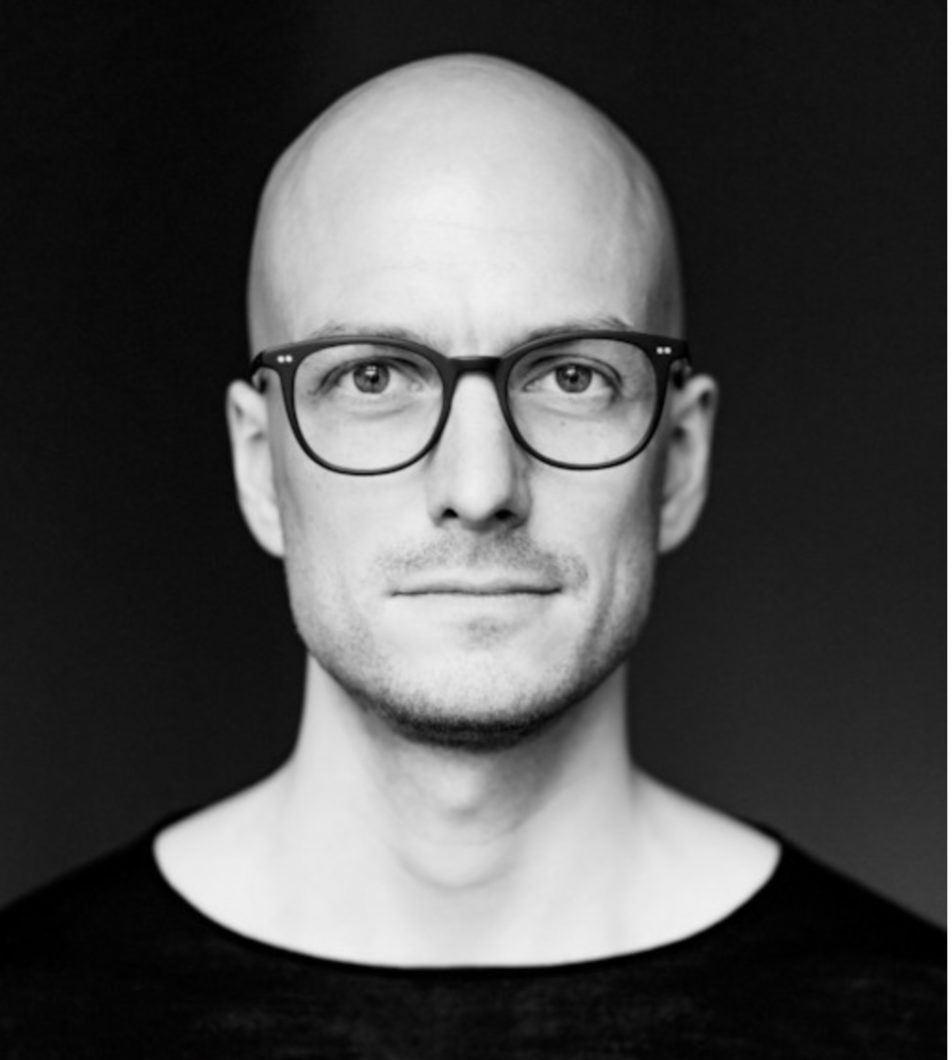
Maximilian Marcoll, 2020

Maximilian Marcoll (* 1981 in Lübeck) is a German composer and performer. He studied percussion, instrumental and electronic composition in Lübeck and Essen. In his work he has focused on the political potential of music and sound. Since April 2021 he has worked as professor of electroacoustic composition and sound art at the University of Music Franz Liszt Weimar and the Bauhaus University Weimar.

== Biography ==
Marcoll first studied percussion at the Musikhochschule Lübeck from 1992 to 1997, composition with Friedhelm Döhl and Dirk Reith in Lübeck from 1997, and at the Folkwang-Hochschule in Essen from 2001 to 2006 with Thomas Neuhaus, Dietrich Hahne, Günther Steinke and Orm Finnendahl. In 2002 he founded the electronic duo dis.playce together with Hannes Seidl. Since 2006 he has been a member of the artist group stock11. From 2007 to 2014 he taught at the Institute for Music and Media at the Robert Schumann Hochschule Düsseldorf, also since 2007 at the Institute for Preparatory Studies at the Musikschule Kreuzberg, and from 2017 to 2020 inclusive he held a teaching position at the Hochschule für Künste Bremen. In 2021 Marcoll was appointed professor of electroacoustic composition and sound art at the University of Music Franz Liszt Weimar and the Bauhaus University, Weimar, and has since directed the Studio for Electroacoustic Music (SeaM).

He writes works for solo instruments, for ensembles of various sizes and instrumentations, including vocal ensembles, as well as electronic music. Among his works are sound installations, videos and media art. For performances of his works he has collaborated with numerous soloists, ensembles and conductors, such as Eva Zöllner, Heather Roche, Sebastian Berweck, Mark Lorenz Kysela, LUX:NM, Suono Mobile, Ensemble Hand werk, Neue Vocalsolisten, AAA---AAA, Ensemble Mosaik, Ensemble United Berlin, Ensemble Nadar, Oh-Ton, Vladimir Jurowski, Enno Poppe, José Luis Castillo and many more.

In 2005 he received the Folkwang Förderpreis and in 2006 he was awarded the Franz Liszt Förderpreis of the Musikhochschule Weimar. In 2018, he received an Honorary Mention at the MA/IN Festival in Matera, Italy for his Amproprifications 6.1 & 6.2. Residencies have taken him to CMMAS in Morelia, ICST in Zurich, Künstlerhaus Lukas in Ahrenshoop, and the Institute for Electronic Music and Acoustics (iem) in Graz.

== Work ==
Marcoll's works repeatedly focus on political and societal aspects. In the installation "Umverteilung" in Ditzingen 2010, for example, he focussed on tracing social imbalances. In his series of works "Compounds" (2008-2014), he combined collected sound material from his immediate surroundings into a "material network" that served as the basis for 8 solo and ensemble compositions. Other works with a strong political impact are "Personal Data" from 2013, a "speech performance for communication monitoring" as well as "If music be the food of love", which deals with music used for torture in US-American secret prisons.

=== Adhan ===
Marcoll's piece "Adhan" for Carillon and Tape, written in 2015 but not premiered in its original form, attracted some attention. It combined the singing of a muezzin with the bells of a carillon and the tone of a Shofar. The concerts planned for Whitsun 2015 on the Carillon in Berlin's Tiergarten were cancelled after the carillonist refused to perform the piece, which had been commissioned for this occasion. Marcoll said in interviews that the reason why he wrote the piece would now become the reason why it would not be performed. "Adhan" was then performed exclusively in a special indoor version for a church in Berlin-Schöneberg. The premiere of the original version was performed by Anna Kasprzycka on June 5, 2022.

=== Amproprifications ===
Since 2016, Marcoll has been working on a series of works called "Amproprifications" (a portmanteau composed of appropriation and amplification) in which existing works by other composers are modulated by volume changes in real time.

"In short, all Amproprifications are elaborate amplification layers for preexisting pieces by other composers. The parts of the performers consist in the performance of scores by other composers. One specific score is performed for each piece in the series. Not a single note of the original's text is being altered, nothing is added, nothing is omitted, nothing is being changed in any way. The electronics on the other hand solely consist of amplification. No additional sound whatsoever is being produced. The possibilities of interference span a large variety of movements, from almost inaudibly slow fadings to extremely fast and brutal chopping. In a figure of speech, all Amproprifications are "silent" pieces. They themselves do not contain or produce any sound. They do, however, constitute filters, readings, processings of the original pieces. The development of the amplification layers are very different each time and stem from aspects regarding structure and content that are based in the respective original: The originals are being superimposed with external layers which have their origin in the works itself."

In addition to the acoustic versions, the Amproprifications are also presented in the form of visualizations. For this purpose, Marcoll transforms the amplification layers into two-dimensional graphics, which have been exhibited internationally in various galleries, ie "Lage Egal" in Berlin.

== Selected works ==
=== Solo ===
- Amproprification #5: Goldrausch, Mark Lorenz Kysela, 2017, 40' (soprano saxophone and electronics)
- Amproprification #2: Ombra, Franco Donatori, 2016, 13' (contrabass clarinet and electronics)
- Amproprification #4: Splitting 8.1, Michael Maierhof, 2016, 15' (saxophone and electronics)
- Amproprification #1: Sequenza 9c, Luciano Berio, 2016, 14' (bass clarinet and electronics)
- Adhan, 2015, 9' (carillon and tape)
- Compoand No.6: VOICE ALARM AIR MACHINE, 2012, 14' (flute and electronics)
- Compoand No.5: CONSTRUCTION ADJUSTMENT, 2011, 14' (percussion and electronics)
- Compoand No.1a: CAR SEX VOICE HONKER, 2009, 18' (accordion and electronics)
- Samstag Morgen – Berlin Neukölln. Studie. and Selbstportrait. Mit Hirsch., 2007, 12' (piano and tape)

=== Chamber music ===
- A C H K, 2019, 50' (2 e-guitars, electronics)
- Fremdbestimmt, 2018, 12' (prepared stroh-viola and narrator)
- Canone Monodico a 2, 2018, 7' (digitally controlled sawtooth wave generator)
- Amproprification #7: Weiss / Weisslich 17c, Peter Ablinger, 2017, 2' (snare drum and radio)
- Amproprification #3: Après un rêve, Gabriel Fauré, 2016, 4' (solo, piano and electronics)
- Heart Score Fetish, 2015, 15' (three performers, keyboard controlled amplification and live video)
- If music be the food of love, 2014, 12' (two soprano saxophones and electronics)
- Compoand No.3: MACHINE CONSTRUCTION AFTERMATH, 2011, 12' (microtonal brass trio and electronics)
- Compoand No.2a: AIR PRESSRE TRAIN TV, 2011, 18' (two percussionists and electronics)
- Compoand No.1: CAR SEX VOICE HONKER, 2008, 18' (two accordions and electronics)

=== Ensemble ===
- Amproprification #9: Schrift/Bild/Schrift, Bernhard Lang, 2019, 22' (ensemble and electronics)
- Amproprification #8.1: Allegro con brio, Eroica, C.F.Ebers, L.v.Beethoven, 2018, 16' (ensemble and electronics)
- Amproprification #6.1 & #6.2: Kyire & Gloria, Missa Papae Marcelli, Giovanni Pierluigi da Palestrina, 2016, 10' (vocal ensemble and electronics)
- Drill & Sander, 2015, 10' (alto trombone, ensemble and electronics)
- Compoand No.8: BREAK REMOVE DEMOLISH, 2014, 15' (violin, cello, ensemble and electronics)
- Personal Data, 2013, 2' (at least 10 performers)
- Compoand No.7: OPERATION ENOK, 2013, 10' (ensemble and electronics)
- Compoand No.4: FRICTION MACHINE ALARM SIGNAL CONSTRUCTION, 2010, 15' (ensemble and electronics)
- Compoand No.2: AIR PRESSURE TRAIN TV, 2009, 18' (six percussionists and electronics)

=== Fixed media ===
- Decaying Values, 2014
- Notturno. Kanon mit Schalentieren, 2008, 2'
- Folgesätze, 2002, 21'

=== Installations ===
- DeadComposers.net, 2018 (web app)
- Control Issues #1: Motorphaser, 2018 (installation)
- FEED. (twelve self-portrait I do not want you to see), 2016 (installation)
- Umverteilung, 2010, (site specific)

=== CDs ===
- Drill & Sander on LUX:NM: LUXUS, 2016 (Genuin)
- Compoand No.4 on stock11: 3, 2013 (aufabwegen)
- Samstag Morgen – Berlin Neukölln. on stock11: 2, 2009 (Naivsuper)
- dis.playce: HABITAT, 2009 (Creative Sources)
- dis.playce: Das Ende von Amerika, 2007 (Naivsuper)
- Marcoll/dis.playce: Split EP, 2006 (luvsound)
- dis.playce: R, 2005 (Naivsuper)
