= Tone Brulin =

Belgian playwright (1926–2019)

- Born: Antoon Maria Albert van den Eynde; 11 May 1926; Antwerp, Belgium
- Died: 15 March 2019 (aged 92); Malaysia
- Occupations: Drama teacher, playwright, stage director

Tone Brulin (born 11 May 1926 as Antoon Maria Albert van den Eynde – 15 March 2019) was a Belgian playwright and stage director; drama teacher from Belgium.

== Career ==
Brulin studied scenography at La Cambre (1943–1946) in Brussels. Its director, Herman Teirlinck, successor of architect Henry Van de Velde, became Brulin's mentor. From 1946 until 1948 Brulin studied theatre at the Studio of the National Theatre in Antwerp. He also attended a BBC training course and became the first TV director for Drama at the Belgian Radio and Television Flemish Service in Brussels. Tone Brulin was co-founder of the avant-garde literary magazines Tijd en Mens (Time and Men) (1948), with Hugo Claus and Louis-Paul Boon and Gard Sivik (1952), with the poets Hugues Pernath and Paul Snoek. He published three volumes of short stories De Neger op de Sofa, Gevecht tussen twee Mannen van Rubber and Popsinger (Nijgh & van Ditmar) He acted in the first Flemish long feature film after the war, Meeuwen sterven in de Haven with his then wife Dora van der Groen and Julien Schoenarts.

In 1953 he founded in Antwerp the "Nederlands Kamertoneel" a professional Chamber Theatre and staged his first experimental plays. Brulin got attention as a playwright after he had won a Prize of the "Boekenweek" in Amsterdam when his play "Twee is te weinig, drie is te veel" was performed in the Stadschouwburg with Queen Juliana of the Netherlands in the audience.

He received the Cultural Youth Passport Prize, the Hegenscheidt Prize of Sabam, the Belgian Copyright Association, the Hustinckx Prize, the Arkprijs van het Vrije Woord, the Belgian National Prize for Playwrights; the Medal of Honour of the City of Brussels and a Prize of the African Press in Belgium. An opera scenario based upon Twee is te weinig was rewarded with the Italia Prize and staged at the "Rai", the Italian TV and Teatro Massimo in Sicily.

During his studies in La Cambre he played the Prince of Aragan in The Merchant of Venice, a production of the "Royal Flemish Theatre". At the end of his acting career he was seen as "Captain Cat" in "Under Milk Wood".

In a continuous search for self-development and training, Brulin traveled around the world. In New York as a Fulbright student first he followed lessons at Lee Strasberg's Actors Studio. Ten years later he returned as an invited professor at the University of Ohio, Antioch College, Bennington College, The Institute of American Indian Arts, the Virginia Commonwealth University.

In Europe he was a guest teacher at the University of Utrecht, the Theatre Academy in Arnhem, the Theatre School in Amsterdam, the Ritcs in Brussels, the Theatre Academy in Maastricht.

He wrote and directed three plays for the Otrabanda Company in New York. The Kaakama Kaakoo in La Mama Experimental Theatre; Stump Removal and Barong Display. Eyes of Chalk (with Kevin Connor who worked with De Niro) and The Fire Eaters Enemy were shown in an off-Broadway theatre by the "Hamm and Clov Theatre Company".

He was appointed as a theatre adviser by the Government of the Netherlands at the Cultural Centre Curaçao and directed also in Aruba, Bonaire, Saba, St. Martin and St. Eustatius Les Negres by Jean Genet and Who's Afraid of Virginia Woolf and travelled widely in Venezuela, Colombia, Ecuador, Costa Rica and Nicaragua where he held theatre workshops.

In Belgium, he returned to the KVS to stage several of his own plays. A tour with that company in Congo which included his play Nu het Dorp niet meer bestaat was the beginning of a contract in Africa. He staged several plays for the South African National Theatre Organisation in Pretoria and founded the "Chamber Theatre", following the Antwerp model. He directed Waiting for Godot in which he played the role of Vladimir. He acted The Dauphin in St. Joan of G.B. Shaw. For the opening of the new aula at the University of Pretoria, a young François Swart, acted the title role of "Germanicus", a cry for freedom.

From the apartheid regime in South Africa Brulin travelled directly to the first independent African State under Kwame Nkrumah; Ghana; married there with the daughter of a local chief, talked and corresponded with the wife of WEB Dubois, Shirley Graham-Dubois; a woman with exceptional political influence.

He returned to Europe with 'Les Chiens', an anti-apartheid play that appeared at the repertoire of the National Theatre of Algeria, Théâtre de la Commune d'Aubervilliers in Paris, Théâtre du Parc in Brussels (directed by Ton Lutz), the Berlin and Ljubeljana television. At the opening night in Paris, among the many spectators were Jean Villar and Aime Cesaire. He wrote a play about Paul Splingaert, a Flemish boy who became a famous Chinese Mandarin.

He directed Kapai-kapai by Arifin C. Noor in Sweden where it was seen in Dramaten, Stockholm's most distinguished theatre. His own plays Turandot and Det er inte Eugene were staged in South Africa, Belgium and Norway, Ochos de Giz in Portugal.

With South African author Athol Fugard he founded the "New Africa Group" which performed in Brussels Palais des Beaux Arts at the International Avant-Garde Theatre Festivalwith A Kakamas Greek by David Herbert.

In the 60s he was a director of television plays at the Flemish Television Service for more than 5O productions, including O'Neill, Oscar Wilde, Synge, Mrozek, Adamov. His play Naga Naga by the Sasaran Theatre of Penang was invited to the Cultural Centre of Jakarta (Indonesia) and as he wrote and directed Roch Anai Anai, a play conceived from "The Soul of the White Ant" by Eugene Marais at the Universiti Technologi Mara at Shah Alam in Malaysia. He directed plays by Michel de Ghelderode in American Universities and Look back in Anger for the Kansas Missouri Theatre.

In 1967 he was a member of the Belgian delegation of the International Theater Institute of Unesco in Warsaw and instrumental in the "discovery" of Jerzy Grotowsky, later universally recognized as a renewer of the art of the theatre.

In 1970 Brulin directed Saboo, the first production of Théâtre Laboratoire Vicinal with Frédéruc Flamand (Plan K, Charleroi Danse now in Marseille). The play was performed at the Shiraz Arts Festival in Iran in the summer of 1970 and caught the attention of Maurice Béjart.

In 1975 he founded The Theatre of the Third World, Tiedrie. Between 1975 and 1985 this company developed a multicultural repertory of African and Asian plays such as Kapai-kapai (12O performances), Ba Anansi, Charkawa Gilgamesh, The Prostitutes of Jakarta of Rendra and the Jero plays of Wole Soyenka. He worked intensively as a pioneer with African and Asian actors since Potopot was published in Théâtre de Belgique and in the early 1950s was staged with an actor of Sierra Leone. He published A Coons Carnival and Our Lady of the Crabs (about hunger in South America). He wrote and directed for DNA, the New Amsterdam under the leadership of Rufus Collins, once a member of the American Living Theatre (A Coon's Carnival, The Night of The Burning Apes, Mudhead).

Some of his works have been translated and published in English, German, French, Spanish, Portuguese, Arabic, Malay, Norwegian, Russian, Hungarian, Romanian, Serbo-Croat and seen at world festivals like the Festival of Caracas, the Festival of Lisbon, the Holland Festival, the Edingburough Fringe, the Nancy Festival, St. Andrews, Bochum, Hong Kong, Grahamstown and Erlangen Festivals.

In 1992, Brulin decorated the "Metro Station Bizet" in Anderlecht, Brussels. He worked as an actor in the dance group of Wim Vandekeybus "Ultima Vez" touring in Europe and the East and in the Opera House, La Monnaie in Brussels in the production Aus einem Totenhaus (Dostoyevsky-Janáček).

He translates poems of the Malaysian A. Samad Said. He is a Knight in the Order of Leopold II.
