= Miklós Forrai =

Hungarian conductor, choir director, and music professor

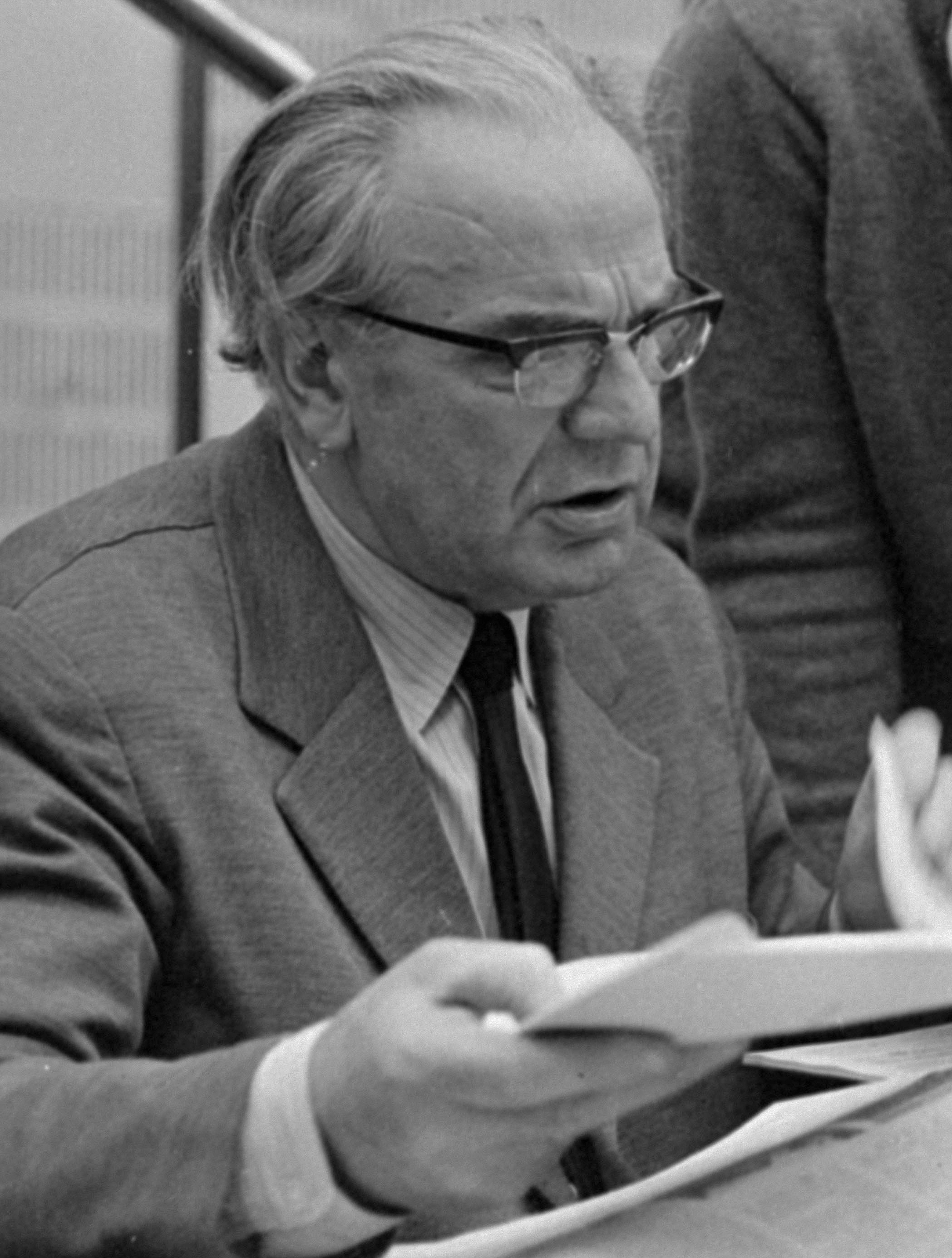
Forrai in 1973

Miklós Forrai (19 October 1913 – 27 December 1998) was a Hungarian conductor, choir director and music professor. In 1980, Forrai received the Robert Schumann Prize of the City of Zwickau.

== Training ==
Born in Magyarszék, in addition to his high school education, Forrai studied piano and music composition at the Városi Zenede, the music school of the city of Debrecen. From 1931 he studied trumpet at the Franz Liszt Academy of Music in Budapest, then stayed two years at the church music department and another year as a choir director. He received a certificate as a singing teacher. In 1935 Zoltán Kodály accepted him into his composition class, directly into the third academic year.

He was married to soprano Mária Gyurkovics with whom he had two daughters.
