= Johann Georg Röllig =

Johann Georg Röllig (or Johann George Roellig as his autograph signature indicates)(1710–1790), brother of composer Johann Christian Roellig (b.1716), was a German composer, organist and Kapellmeister at the Court of Anhalt-Zerbst. From the age of 17, Roellig was a student at the Dresden Kreuzschule. According to his autobiography, J.G. Roellig studied composition, with court composer Jan Dismas Zelenka (1679-1745), lessons paid for by Count von Brühl, the Saxon Prime Minister, indicating that the young composer had come to attention of one of the most important figures at the Dresden court. In 1736, he matriculated at the University of Leipzig to study theology. In 1737, Prince Johann August of Anhalt-Zerbst heard Roellig perform and appointed him Court Organist and Court Musician. On the death of court Kapellmeister, Johann Friedrich Fasch, in 1758, Roellig (along with the court Konzertmeister, Carl Hoeckh) assumed some of his duties, particularly in continuing to supply the court with cantatas. Following Hoeckh's death in 1773, Roellig was finally appointed Kapellmeister in 1774.

== Works ==
As is common with many composers of the period, little of what was once a large corpus of sacred music composed by J.G. Roellig has survived, so that a full assessment of his music is difficult. J.G. Roellig, the quintessential example of a musician in courtly service, performed and composed music principally for use in the Schloßkirche. A prolific composer of church cantatas and other sacred music, Roellig produced at least four Passions, and one full cycle of cantatas, and contributed to other cycles performed in the Zerbst Schloßkirche. Other duties included writing annual birthday cantatas and serenatas for the extended princely family from 1758. The St Mark Passion (1750) and later vocal works, such as the coronation music for Gustav III of Sweden (1772) and the only published work, the motet Lobe den Herrn (1785), indicate a style that is very similar to that adopted by his almost exact contemporaries Gottfried August Homilius (1714-1785) and Johann Friedrich Doles (1715-1797). As a church composer J.G. Roellig generally upheld a more ‘learned’ style across his extant output. Almost to the death of Mozart, Roellig adhered consistently to styles and structures that would be recognised by J.S. Bach’s generation. Works such as the St. Mark's Passion „Gehet heraus und schauet an, ihr Tochter Zion" (1750), previously attributed to C. P. E. Bach, indicate the quality of his writing. His other notable output includes special cantatas and serenatas for the birthdays of rulers of Anhalt-Zerbst, including Catherine the Great, daughter of Prince Christian August. In 2019, the local newspaper, the Volksstimme reported that a volume had been bought for the Francisceum Library in Zerbst which contained the texts of several unknown works by Fasch and Roellig. Significant surviving works include Roellig's cantata to mark the death of Adolf Frederick, King of Sweden in 1771 (RISM 190013945 "Sei getreu bis in den Tod") and a cantata (RISM 190022943 "Euer Herz soll sich freuen") and Missa brevis to mark the coronation of his successor Gustav III. The latter was published in an edition by Nigel Springthorpe by Prima la musica in 2020.
