= Herbert Schernus =

- Born: 15 March 1927; Wießen, Kreis Heydekrug, Lithuania
- Died: 10 May 1994 (aged 67); Nideggen, Germany
- Education: Musikhochschule Hamburg
- Occupation: Choral conductor
- Organizations: Kölner Rundfunkchor

Herbert Schernus (born 9 March 1927 – 15 March 1994) was a German choral conductor, the second music director of the Kölner Rundfunkchor from 1962 to 1989.

Schernus was born in Wießen, Kreis Heydekrug, now Vyžiai, Lithuania. He studied conducting and composition at the Musikhochschule Hamburg. He was a Kapellmeister at the Stadttheater Bremerhaven, then assistant for the NDR Sinfonieorchester and at the Hamburgische Staatsoper.

In 1962, Schernus moved to the Westdeutscher Rundfunk (WDR) in Cologne. He focused on collaboration with contemporary composers whose works he prepared and conducted. Under his direction, numerous world premieres have been performed, which have established and consolidated the reputation of the Kölner Rundfunkchor nationally and internationally. He prepared them for recordings of classical music, especially contemporary music. Schernus died in Nideggen.
