= Joshard Daus =

German choral conductor (1947–2021)

Joshard Daus (1947, Hamburg – 26 November 2021) was a German choral conductor. He was noted for revival in performance and recording of the lost passion oratorios of CPE Bach.
