= List of compositions by Felix Weingartner =

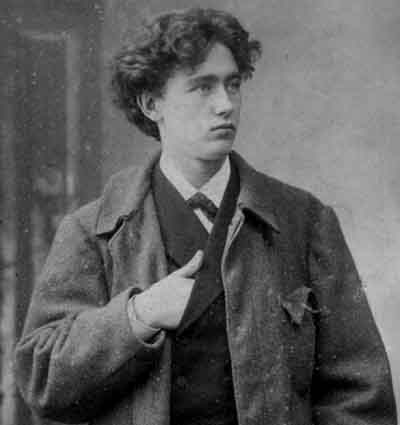
Weingartner c. 1890

This is a list of compositions by Felix Weingartner.

== Piano ==
=== Piano solo ===
- Skizzen, Op. 1
- Tonbilder zu Adalbert Stifters Studien, Op. 2
- Aus vergangener Zeit, Op. 3
- Lose Blätter, Op. 4
- Phantasiebilder, Op. 5
- Herbstblätter, Op. 58

== Chamber music ==
=== Violin and piano ===
- Violin Sonata No. 1 in D, Op. 42/1
- Violin Sonata No. 2 in F♯ minor, Op. 42/2

=== String quartets ===
- String Quartet No. 1 in D minor, Op. 24
- String Quartet No. 2 in F minor, Op. 26
- String Quartet No. 3 in F major, Op. 34
- String Quartet No. 4 in D major, Op. 62
- String Quartet No. 5 in E♭ major, Op. 81

=== String quintet ===
- String Quintet in C major, Op. 40

=== Other ===
- Piano Sextet in E minor, Op. 33
- Quintet in G minor for Clarinet, Violin, Viola, Cello and Piano, Op. 50
- Octet in G major for Clarinet, Horn, Bassoon, Two Violins, Viola, Cello and Piano, Op. 73
- String Trio No. 2 in A Major, Op. 93/2

== Orchestral ==
=== Symphonies ===
- Symphony No. 1 in G major, Op. 23 (1899)
- Symphony No. 2 in E♭ major, Op. 29 (1901)
- Symphony No. 3 in E major, Op. 49 (1910)
- Symphony No. 4 in F major, Op. 61 (1917)
- Symphony No. 5 in C minor, Op. 71 (1926)
- Symphony No. 6 "La Tragica" in B minor, Op. 74 (1929)
- Symphony No. 7 "Choral" in C major, Op. 87 (1935-7), on poems by Carmen Studer and Friedrich Hölderlin.

=== Symphonic poems ===
- König Lear, Op. 20 (1895)
- Das Gefilde der Seligen, Op. 21 (1892)
- La Burla, Op. 78
- Frühling, Op. 80

=== Violin and orchestra ===
- Violin Concerto in G major, Op. 52

=== Cello and orchestra ===
- Cello Concerto in A minor, Op. 60

=== Other ===
- Serenade in F major for String Orchestra, Op. 6
- Lustige Overture for Orchestra, Op. 53 (1910)
- 'Aus ernster Zeit', Ouverture for Orchestra, Op. 56
- An die Schweiz, Variations for Orchestra, Op. 79
- Sinfonietta, Op. 83
- Bilder aus Japan, Op. 91
- Der Sturm, Ouverture for Orchestra (1918)
- Der Sturm, Suite for Orchestra

== Operas ==
- Sakuntala, Op. 9
- Malawika (und Agnimitra), Op. 10
- Genesius, Op. 14
- Orestes, Op. 30, 1902 Oper Leipzig (trilogy):
  - Agamemnon, Op. 30/1
  - Das Totenopfer, Op. 30/2
  - Die Erinyen, Op. 30/3
- Kain und Abel, Op. 54
- Dame Kobold, Op. 57
- Die Dorfschule, Op. 64
- Meister Andrea, Op. 66
- Der Apostat, Op. 72

== Incidental music ==
- Musik zu Goethes Faust, Op. 43
- Der Sturm, Op. 65
- Terra, ein Symbol

== Choral music ==
- Traumnacht und Sturmhymnus, Op. 38
- Freiheitsgesang, Op. 67
- Auferstehung, Op. 69
- Immer, Op. 86/1
- Ave-Maria-Läuten, Op. 86/2
- Verheißung, Op. 86/3

== Lieder ==
- Lieder für Singstimme und Klavier, Op. 7
- Lieder für Singstimme und Klavier, Op. 8
- Die Wallfahrt nach Kevelaer, Op. 12
- Lieder für Singstimme und Klavier, Op. 13
- Acht Lieder für Singstimme und Klavier, Op. 15
- Acht Lieder für Singstimme und Klavier, Op. 16
- Drei Lieder für Singstimme und Klavier, Op. 17
- Severa, Op. 18
- Hilaria, Op. 19
- Zwölf Gedichte für Sopran / Tenor und Klavier, Op. 22
- Sechs Lieder für Sopran / Tenor und Klavier, Op. 25
- Drei Gedichte aus Gottfried Kellers Jugendzeit, Op. 27
- Zwölf Lieder für Sopran / Tenor und Klavier, Op. 28
- Vier Lieder für Sopran / Tenor und Klavier, Op. 31
- Sechs Märchenlieder für Sopran / Tenor und Klavier, Op. 32
- Unruhe der Nacht, Op. 35,1
- Stille der Nacht, Op. 35,2
- Lieder und Gesänge für Singstimme und Orchester, Op. 36
- Zwei Balladen von Carl Spitteler, Op. 37
- Aus fernen Welten, Op. 39
- Drei Lieder für Singstimme und Klavier, Op. 44
- Lieder für Singstimme und Klavier, Op. 45
- Fünf Lieder für Singstimme und Klavier, Op. 46
- Vier Lieder für Singstimme und Klavier, Op. 47
- Sechs Lieder für Singstimme und Klavier, Op. 48
- Abendlieder, Op. 51
- Vier Lieder für Singstimme und Klavier, Op. 55
- Daheim, Op. 59
- Blüten aus dem Osten, Op. 63
- Lieder für Singstimme und Klavier, Op. 68
- Lieder für Singstimme und Klavier, Op. 70
- Lieder für Singstimme und Klavier, Op. 75
- Lieder für Singstimme und Klavier, Op. 76
- An den Schmerz, Op. 77
- Der Weg, Op. 82
- Rom, Op. 90
