= Pixie Paris =

German pop band

- Genres: Pop
- Years active: 2003–present
- Website: www.pixieparis.com

Pixie Paris is a pop duo formed by the Belgian singer Cindy Hennes and the Swiss musician Matthias Kräutli.

The two musicians met in 2003 at the Hochschule für Musik und Theater Hamburg. The debut album Popnonstop was self-published in 2013. The song Es rappelt im Karton from 2014 was used in early 2016 for a commercial of the adult website Eis.de and brought it to YouTube on more than 8.5 million hits. The single was re-released by Sony Music and placed in the German charts, reaching 47th.

== Discography ==
- 2010: Popmusik (Maxi-Single, 105 Music)
- 2013: Popnonstop (Album)
- 2013: Ich lieb dich nicht immer (Single, Limeroads)
- 2014: Es rappelt im Karton (Single, Ultra Records)
- 2017: Cabriolet (Single, Ultra Records)
