= Strohm =

Strohm is a surname. Notable people with the surname include:

- Adam Strohm (1870–1951), American librarian
- Chuck Strohm (born 1964), American politician
- Gertrude Strohm (1843-1927), American author, compiler and game designer
- Harry Strohm (1901–1975), American minor league baseball player and manager
- Heinrich Karl Strohm (1895–1959), German opera manager
- John Strohm (congressman) (1793–1884), American politician
- John Strohm (musician) (born 1967), American guitarist, singer and lawyer
- Reinhard Strohm (born 1942), German musicologist
- Thomas Strohm (1846–1929), American fire chief of Los Angeles and City Council member

== See also ==
- Peter Strohm, a German television series
