= Johannes Brahms Medal =

German music award

The Johannes Brahms Medal (German: Johannes-Brahms-Medaille) of Hamburg is a music award established in 1928, named after the composer Johannes Brahms who was born in Hamburg.

The medal is given irregularly by the Senat der Freien und Hansestadt Hamburg to artists who contributed to musical life in Hamburg, especially devoted to music by Brahms. The medal shows a portrait of the composer. It was designed by the Hamburg sculptor Friedrich Wield. Until 1935, it was primarily given to German or Austrian composers, and for services to the musical life of Hamburg. In 1935, international members of the Permanent Council organising Hamburg's International Festival were all awarded medals.

== Selected recipients ==
- 1928: Karl Muck
- 1929: Hamburger Philharmonisches Orchester und Orchester of the Hamburger Stadttheater
- 1933: Eugen Papst, Alfred Sittard, Karl Böhm
- 1934: Richard Strauss
- 1935: Hans Pfitzner, Jean Sibelius, Albert Roussel, Siegmund von Hausegger, Joseph Haas, Emil Nikolaus von Reznicek, Kurt Atterberg, Wilhelm Kienzl, Herbert Bedford
- 1937: Wilhelm Furtwängler, Paul Graener, Heinrich Karl Strohm, Eugen Jochum
- 1958: Robert Casadesus, Philipp Jarnach, Joseph Keilberth, Leopold Ludwig, Günther Rennert, Hans Schmidt-Isserstedt, Heinz Tietjen, Henny Wolff
- 1960: Ernst Gernot Klussmann
- 1963: Robert Heger, Ilse Fromm-Michaels
- 1964: Claude Rostand, Frank Wohlfahrt
- 1970: Erna Berger
- 1973: Wolfgang Sawallisch, Rolf Liebermann, Emil Gilels
- 1976: Monteverdi-Chor Hamburg
- 1982: Hamburger Symphoniker
- 1983: Aldo Ceccato
- 1987: Yehudi Menuhin
- 1988: Günter Wand
- 1989: Detlef Kraus
- 1990: Hellmut Wormsbächer
- 1991: Jürgen Jürgens
- 1994: Felicitas Kukuck
- 1996: Conrad Hansen
- 1997: Günter Jena
- 1998: NDR Sinfonieorchester
- 2001: Hamburger Alsterspatzen
- 2004: Hermann Rauhe
- 2010: NDR Chor
- 2012: Hamburger Kammermusikfreunde
- 2020: Christoph von Dohnanyi
- 2024: Ensemble Resonanz
