= Ilse Fromm-Michaels =

German pianist and composer

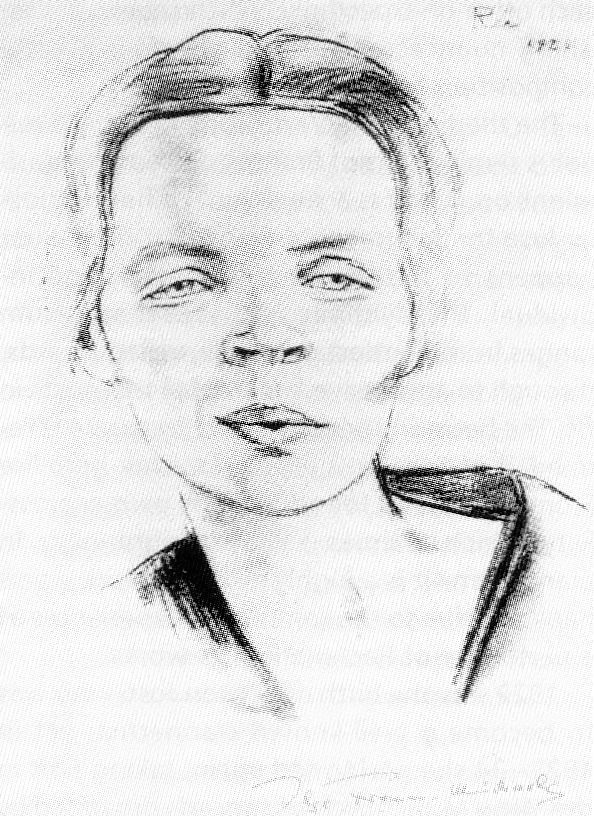
Fromm-Michaels

Ilse Fromm-Michaels (Hamburg, 30 December 1888 – 22 January 1986) was a German pianist and composer.

== Life ==
Ilse Fromm-Michaels was born in Hamburg and showed musical talent at an early age. She studied music in Berlin, first at the Hochschule fur Musik with Heinrich van Eyken for composition and with Marie Bender for piano. In 1905 she began study at the Sternsche Conservatory of Hans Pfitzner and James Kwast and completed her studies in 1913 with conductor and composer Fritz Steinbach and pianist Carl Friedberg in Cologne.

In 1908 Fromm-Michaels began a career as a concert pianist, often playing her own works. She married Hamburg judge Dr. Walter Michaels, and after the Nuremberg Race Laws were instituted by the Nazis was banned from performing or publishing her compositions. She continued teaching music, and after World War II established the Hamburg First School of Music and Drama. In 1964 she was awarded the City of Hamburg's Johannes Brahms Medal. In 1973 she moved to Detmold to be near her son, and died there in 1986.

== Works ==
Selected works include:

- Variationen über ein eigenes Thema, op. 8 (1918/19)
- Vier Puppen, op. 4 (1908)
- Der Hampelmann
- Das Puppenmädchen
- Der Harlekin
- Acht Skizzen(1908) No. I-VIII
- Sonate für Klavier op. 6 (1917)
- Sehr langsam. Frei im Zeitmaß
- Lebhaft, aber nicht schnell
- Walzerreigen, op. 7 (1917)
- Passacaglia für Klavier, op. 16 (1932)
- Langsamer Walzer (1950?)
- Der Maria Geburt, op. 9, no. 2 (Text: Des Knaben Wunderhorn)
- Die Meise, op. 9, no. 5 (Text: Des Knaben Wunderhorn)
- Engelsgesang, op. 9, no. 3 (Text: Des Knaben Wunderhorn)
- Frau Nachtigall, op. 9, no. 1 (Text: Des Knaben Wunderhorn)
- Wiegenlied einer alten frommen Magd, op. 9, no. 4 (Text: Des Knaben Wunderhorn)
- Stimmungen eines Fauns für Klavier, op. 10
- 3 Kanons für 3 Frauenstimmen, op. 11
- Eulenspiegelei und eine eingerahmte Fuge für Klavier, op. 12
- Suite c-moll für Cello solo, op. 15 (1931)
- Marien-Passion für Chor, Kammerorchester und Orgel, op. 18 (1932/33)
- Symphonie c-moll für großes Orchester (ursprünglich als Streichquartett konzipiert), op. 19 (1938)
- Musica Larga, für Streichquartett mit einer Klarinette (rec: 1968 | Melos Quartett Stuttgart, Jost Michaels)

Part of her works have been recorded and issued on CD, including:

- Sämtliche Klavierwerke (Complete Piano Works), Babette Dorn, piano (Tacet 096); Stuttgart 1999.
