= Catherine Rückwardt =

German pianist and conductor (born 1960)

- Born: Catherine Beckmann; 7 April 1960 (age 65); Los Angeles, United States
- Education: Musikhochschule Lübeck; Hochschule für Musik und Theater Hamburg
- Occupation: Conductor
- Organizations: Frankfurt Opera; Staatstheater Mainz

Catherine Rückwardt (née Beckmann; born 7 April 1960) is a German pianist and conductor. She was Generalmusikdirektorin of the Staatstheater Mainz from 2001 to 2011, and has worked freelance since that time.

== Career ==
Born Catherine Beckmann in Los Angeles, the daughter of the conductor and pianist Irvin Beckmann and the singer Judith Beckmann, Rückwardt studied violin at the Musikhochschule Lübeck from 1975. She studied piano from 1981 at the Hochschule für Musik und Theater Hamburg, graduating in 1984. She further studied voice, accompaniment of Lieder (Liedbegleitung), and conducting, with Dietrich Fischer-Dieskau and Hermann Prey, among others. In 1995, she took a conducting class with Helmuth Rilling at the Internationale Bachakademie Stuttgart.

She worked at the Theater Bremen from 1984, first as a repetiteur, making her debut as a conductor in 1985 with Carl Zeller's operetta Der Vogelhändler. From 1989, she was Studienleiterin and Kapellmeisterin. She was Kapellmeisterin at the Oper Frankfurt from 1997 to 2001, when she became Generalmusikdirektorin of the Staatstheater Mainz. She was the first woman at the house in that position. She was one of only four women in a leading conducting position, of 76 opera houses in Germany. From 2006, she was also Intendantin of the Philharmonisches Staatsorchester Mainz. Her focus was the presentation of rarely performed operas and work with children and young people. She left the Mainz theatre in 2011 to work as a freelance conductor. The program for her last symphony concert was typical in combining rarely played works with well-known repertory: beginning with Schönberg's Begleitmusik zu einer Lichtspielszene, followed by a violin concerto by Nikolai Roslavets, rediscovered in 1989, and finally the Fourth Symphony by Johannes Brahms.

She recorded with the Mainz orchestra the First Symphony by Hans Rott and the musical Christmas play for children Nussknacker und Mausekönig. She served as a member of the jury for the Felix Mendelssohn Bartholdy Wettbewerb in Leipzig in the category viola.

== Awards ==
Rückwardt was awarded the ZONTA-Kunstpreis and the Gutenberg-Büste of Mainz.
