= Walter Blume (musician) =

Walter Blume (b. Phillipsburg, Germany. 8 January 1883 active 1910s—1930s) was a German kapellmeister, music critic, and scholar of Johannes Brahms.

== Biography ==
A student of Felix Mottl and Ludwig Thuille he was kapellmeister in Koblenz in 1912 and led the Volksymphoniekonzerte in Munich 1914. He also studied with Fritz Steinbach and after publishing the latter's notes on Brahms' scores became best known as a writer and editor of Brahms.

An enthusiast of anthroposophy he published a lecture Musikalische Betrachtungen in geisteswissenschaftlichem Sinn in Berlin in 1917, which were in the main well received by Rudolf Steiner himself.

He was in January 1919 the first editor of Der Weg a short-lived monthly magazine "for Art, Literature and Music" which was the most progressive voice for art in Munich in the immediate post war. The editorship passed to the writer Eduard Trautner and the artist Fritz Schaefler after the third issue, and then the magazine ceased with the eighth issue. At this period he is recorded as a habituée of the Munich Café Stefanie.

== Publications ==
- Brahms in der Meininger Tradition Stuttgart, 1933
