= Philipp Buchner =

German composer

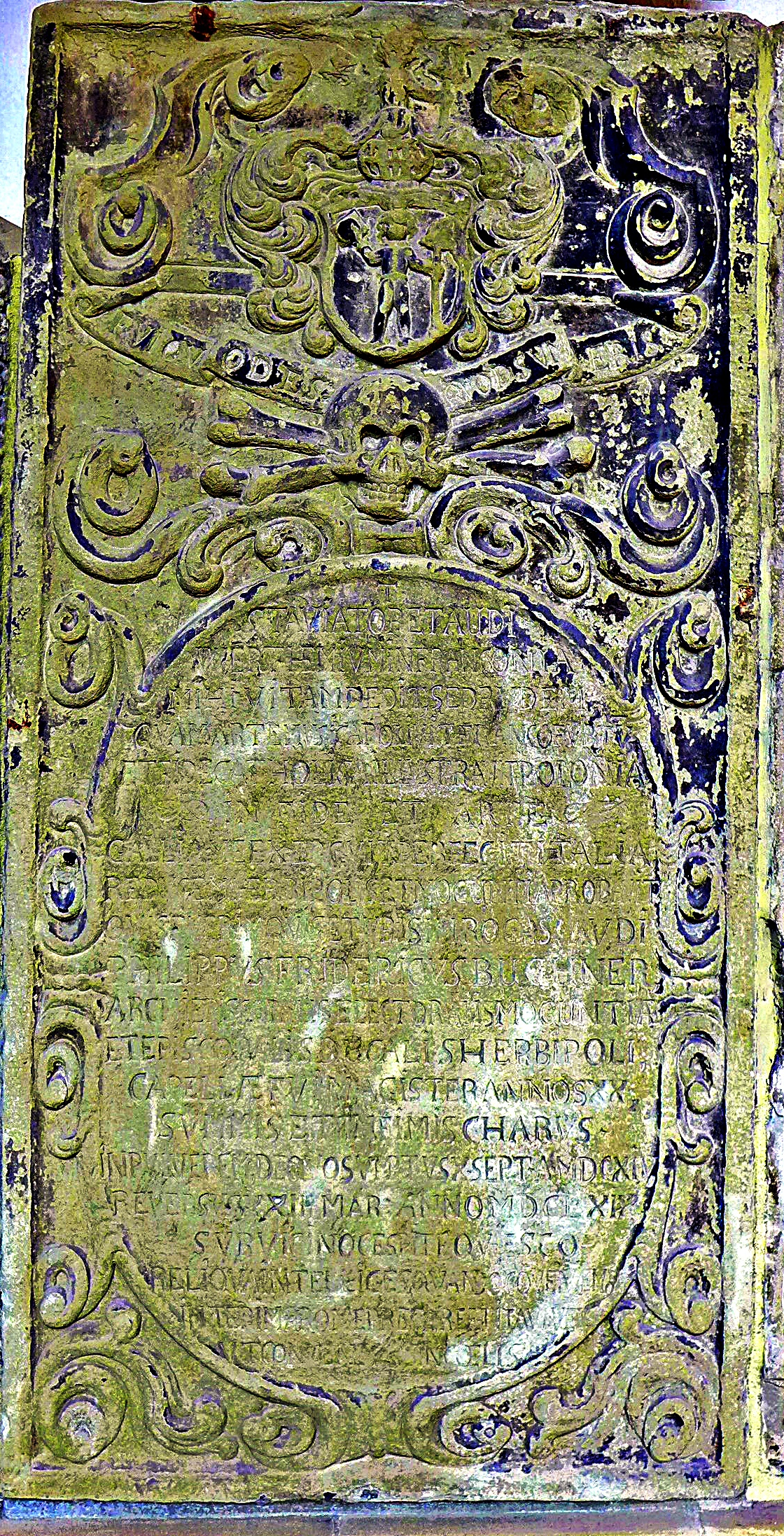
Würzburg Cathedral Cloister, tombstone of Philipp Friedrich Buchner

Philipp Friedrich Buchner (11 September 1614, in Wertheim – 23 March 1669, in Würzburg) was a German composer. He converted to Catholicism in Poland, and travelled to Italy to absorb the new style of Monteverdi. On his return to Germany he was employed by bishop Johann Philipp von Schönborn in Mainz for his Electoral orchestra.

== Works, editions, recordings ==
His works available in modern edition include a Christmas cantata. Selections from his collection Plectrum Musicum were recorded by the ensemble Parnassi Musici and the Bavarian Chamber Orchestra for CPO in 2005.
