= First Piano Quartet =

The First Piano Quartet (Vladimir Padwa, Adam Garner, Frank Mittler, and Edward Edson) in 1949.

The First Piano Quartet was a quartet of pianists first organized in the United States in 1941. Its founding members were Vladimir Padwa, George Robert, Adam Garner, and Henry Holt. The quartet was originally conceived of as a radio group, with a weekly show that soon became twice weekly. In 1943, Franz Mittler and Edward Edson replaced George Robert and Henry Holt, who had joined the army. The quartet made its New York concert debut in 1949.

The quartet toured extensively with their four Steinway pianos from the 1940s through the late 1950s, and made recordings in the 1940s and 1950s. Most of its arrangements were made by Adam Garner.

By 1950, Padwa had left the quartet, replaced temporarily by George Robert. In 1952, Glauco D'Attili (1920–2007) became the latest member, replacing George Robert. D'Attili, a former child prodigy from Rome was brought to the United States in 1927 by Benjamino Gigli and was probably the most well-known of the group. He appeared, along with Edward Edson, Adam Garner, and Frank Mittler, in two movie shorts for 20th Century Fox in 1954, The First Piano Quartette and Piano Encores. Both were directed by Otto Lang, and The First Piano Quartette was nominated for an Academy Award in 1954 in the category Best Short Subject, One-reel. The group also appeared on both The Ed Sullivan Show (Episode #7.30) and The Lawrence Welk Show.

In the mid-1950s D'Attili was replaced by William Gunther (Sprecher) and the quartet renamed itself to the Original Piano Quartet. The quartet appeared under its new name at the Town Hall, New York, on March 29, 1962.

In 1970 William Gunther asked Rami Bar-Niv to replace him in the quartet. Bar-Niv was part of the quartet until he returned to Israel in 1972.

The First Piano Quartet's collection of music is housed in the Music Division of the New York Public Library for the Performing Arts.

== Bibliography ==
- David Ewen, Encyclopedia of Concert Music. New York; Hill and Wang, 1959.
