= Symphony No. 2 (Weingartner) =

Symphony No.2
- by Felix Weingartner
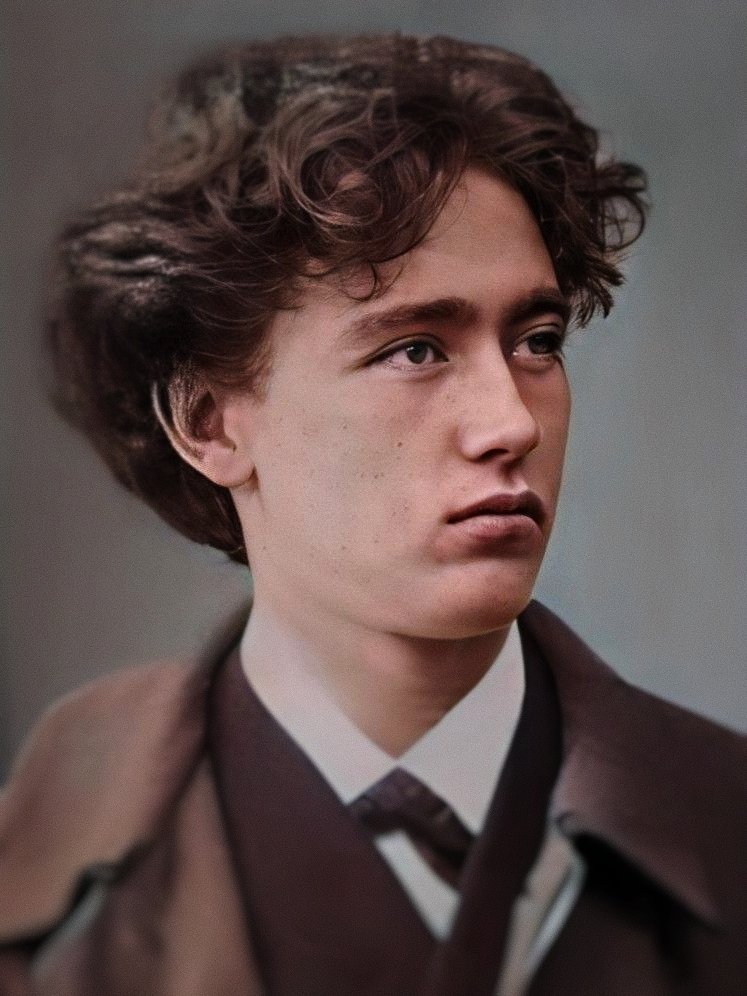
- Felix Weingartner around 1890
- Key: E♭ major
- Opus: 29
- Period: Romantic
- Composed: 1897-99
- Dedication: Franz Wüllner
- Published: 1901
- Publisher: Breitkopf und Härtel
- Duration: 47 min
- Movements: 4

Felix Weingartner's Symphony No. 2 in E♭ major, Op. 29 is a musical composition that Weingartner started in 1897 and completed in 1899. The overall musical language of the piece is late-romantic although with a high emphasis on Schubertian melodicism. Furthermore, as with other contemporary Austrian composers of the end of the 20th century such as Gustav Mahler or Hans Rott, his second symphony heavily uses a Brucknerian treatment of simple motifs through extensive repetition and grand orchestration.

== Introduction ==
Composed between 1897 and 1899, his Second Symphony was premiered in Germany in 1900. In the following years it was performed several times across Europe, usually under Weingartner's own baton. In 1901 it was premiered in London by Sir Henry Wood at the Proms, the only symphony by the composer performed there. The same year it was premiered in Paris and Munich under Weingartner's direction, in Chicago under Theodore Thomas (in November) and in 1905 the composer premiered it in Berlin. The symphony received generally cold responses, which are said to have distressed the composer. The German musicologist Hugo Goldschmidt averred that it demonstrated "an embarrassing mismatch between intention and ability". A less negative French reviewer said the work was not so much a symphony as an orchestral suite, whose movements are in no way linked together. All agreed that it was an unoriginal effort.

There is no recorded public performance of the work after World War I, and the composition was generally forgotten until CPO released a recording of the work in 2006, with Marko Letonja conducting the Basel Symphony.

== Instrumentation ==
The work is scored for a symphony orchestra consisting of the following assemble:

Woodwinds

3 flutes (3rd also takes piccolo)
3 oboes (3rd also takes English horn)
3 clarinets
3 bassoons (3rd also takes contrabassoon)

Brass

4 horns

3 trumpets
3 trombones
1 tuba

Percussion

timpani

Strings

harp
1st violins
2nd violins
violas
cellos
double basses

== Form ==
There are four movements:

1. Lento – Allegro mosso (E♭ major)
2. Scherzo: Allegro giocoso 3/4 (C major)
3. Adagio, ma non troppo, cantabile 4/8 (A♭ major)
4. Allegro risoluto (E♭ major)

A typical performance lasts between 45 and 50 minutes.

== Analysis ==
=== I. Lento – Allegro mosso ===
The first movement consists of a sonata form with a slow introduction. A brass outburst starts the symphony, which is responded by pianissimo pizzicatos in the strings.

=== II. Scherzo: Allegro giocoso ===
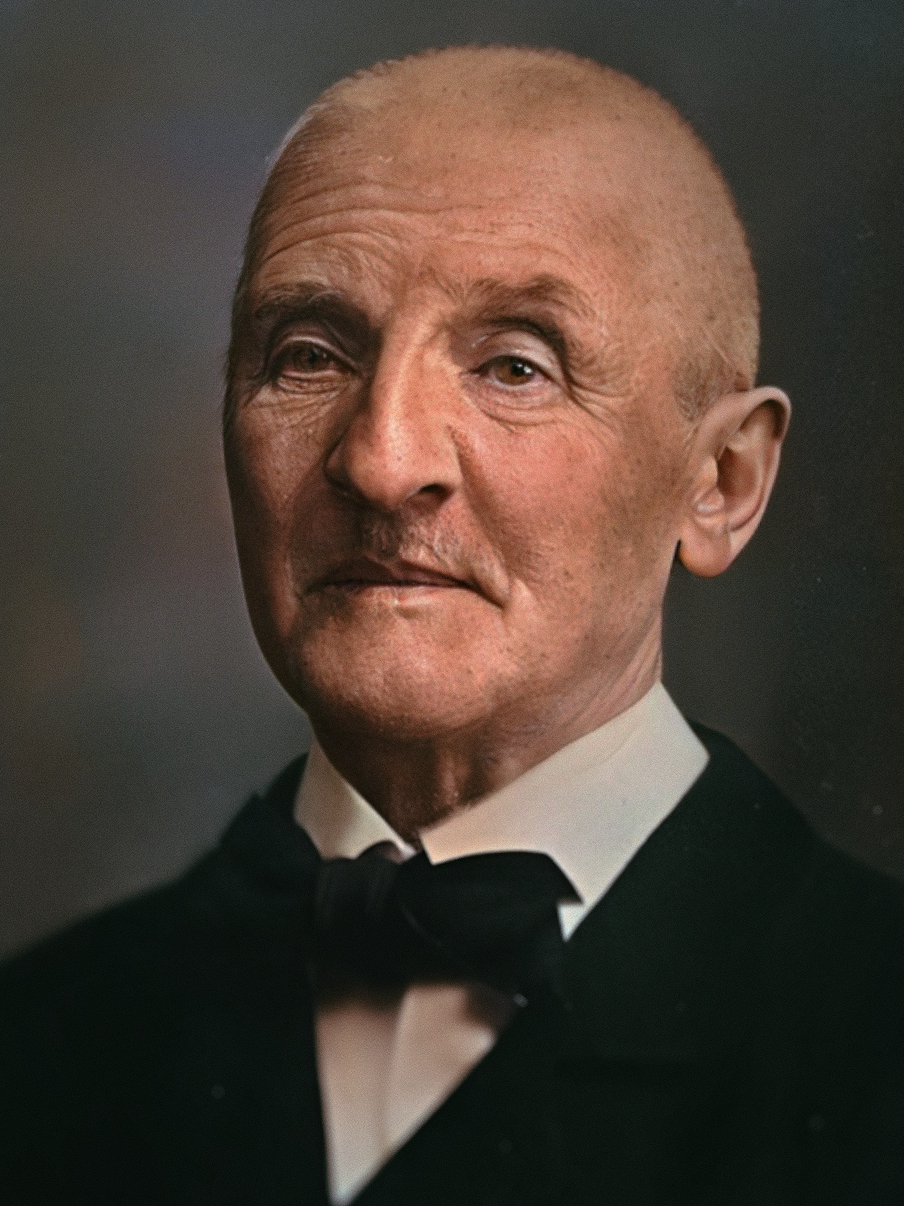
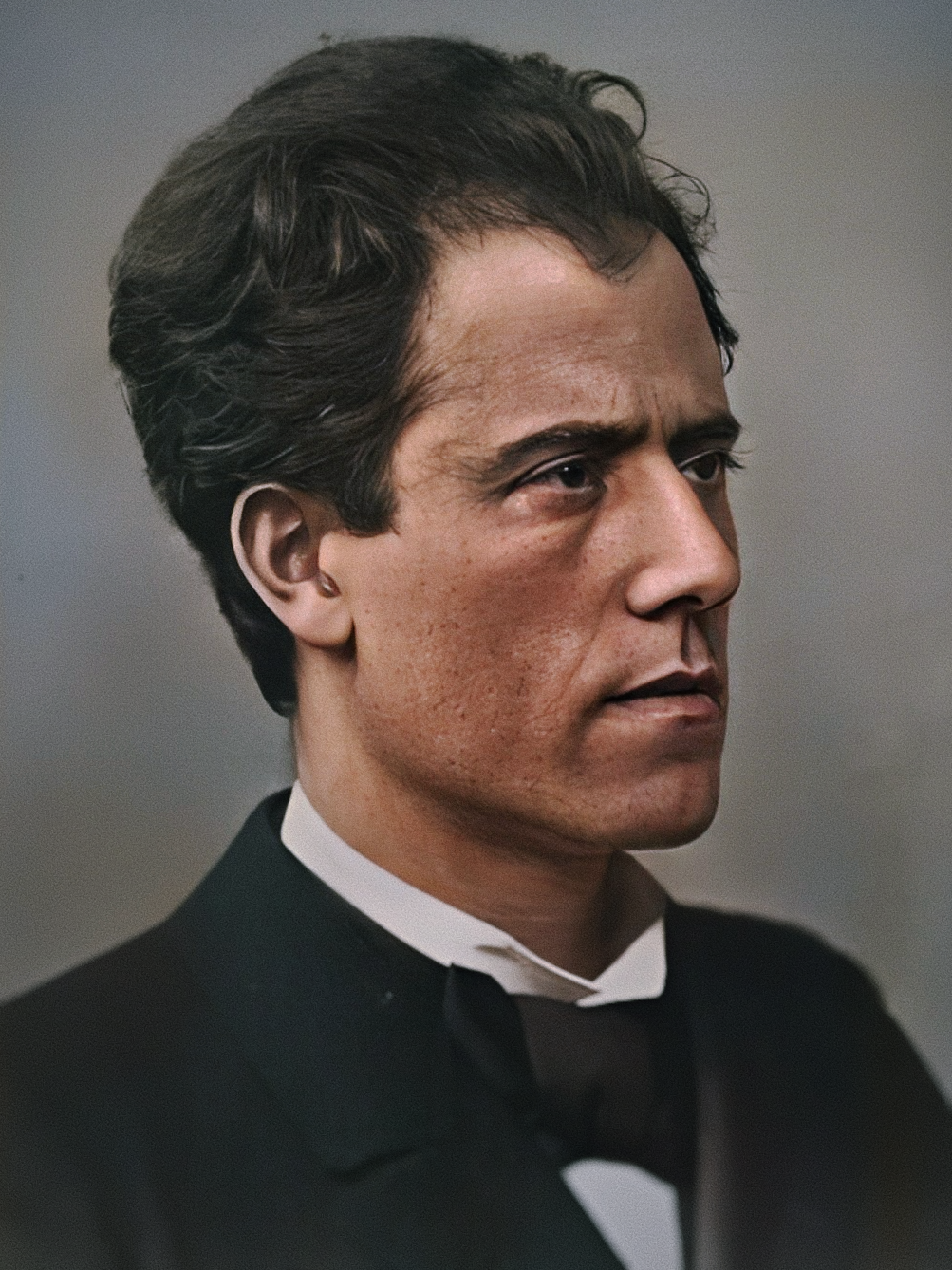
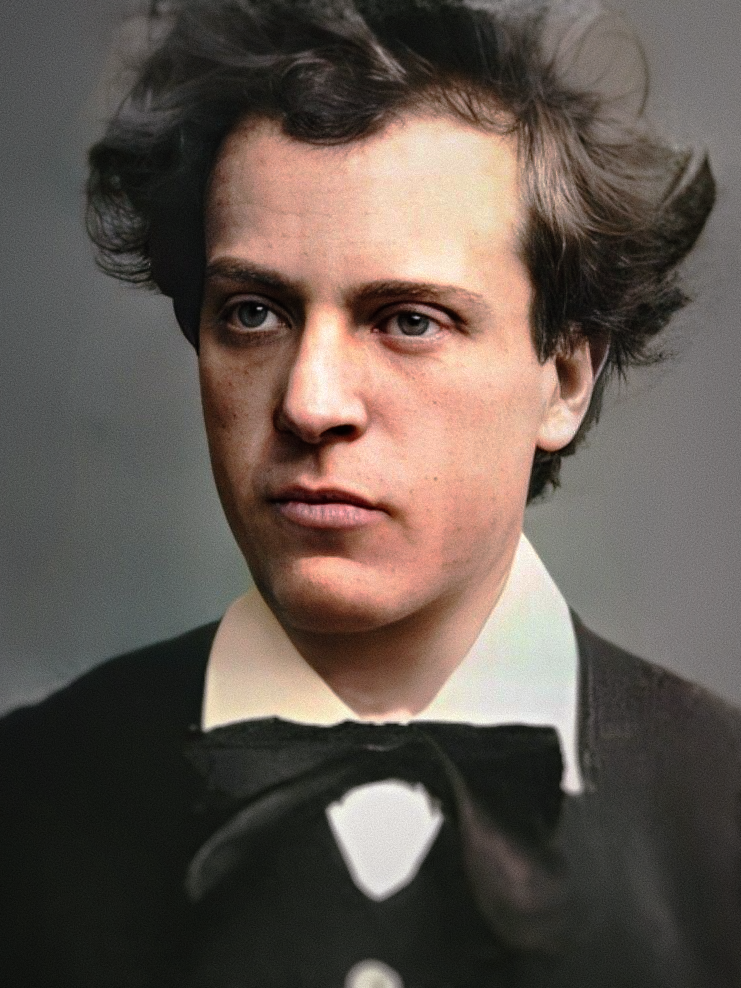
Bruckner, Mahler and Rott as well used the Austrian landler for their scherzos and were a source of inspiration for the symphony.

The second movement is a simple scherzo and trio in the form of the traditional Austrian ländler similar to the scherzos of his contemporaries Mahler and Rott, who they in turn where inspired by the ländler-scherzos of Bruckner and even earlier Schubert. If the first movement ended in E♭ major, the tonality of the scherzo shifts to C major; the parallel major of the submediant of E♭ major (C minor). Marked "giocoso", the mood is joyful and lively. From all the movements of the symphony, the second is the most outwardly Brucknerian, creating extensive textures based upon simple ostinatos. Nevertheless, this motivic treatment is usually contrasted with strong melodicism both in the strings and horns.

The main theme of the scherzo section is played first in the violins:

This leaps of the fifth and the octave becomes an essential motif for the development of the movement which provides the rhythm and feel of the ländler:

The scherzo section ends with an ostinato played in unison:

The trio quickly changes the musical texture, now with the ostinato played in the flute and a pastoral melody in the violas:

=== III. Adagio, ma non troppo, cantabile ===
The third movement is molded after Beethoven's 9th Symphony's slow movement. A clarinet solo establishes the key of A♭ major (the subdominant of E♭ major) which in consequence leads to an extended Beethovenian hymn-like melody for the strings:

After a solo violin, the second theme in the clarinets and bassoons is presented:

In a manner similar to the double variations of the slow movement of Beethoven's 9th, with these two themes established, a short set of double variations follows.

=== IV. Allegro risoluto ===
The fourth movement cycles back and reuses material of the 4-minute slow introduction of the first movement. Nevertheless, Weingartner synthesizes the 4-minute introduction into a condensed 1-minute prelude for the fugal section that follows.
