= Emil Steinbach (conductor) =

German conductor and composer

Emil Steinbach (November 15, 1849 – December 6, 1919) was a German conductor and composer. He was particularly known for his interpretations of the works of Richard Wagner. He notably conducted the first public performance of Wagner's Siegfried Idyll in 1877.

Born in Lengenrieden, Baden, Steinbach was the elder brother and first music teacher of the composer and conductor Fritz Steinbach and the great-uncle of Peter Maag. He studied under Hermann Levi at the Leipzig Conservatory from 1867 to 1869. From 1871–74 he was Kapellmeister in Mannheim; from 1874–77 he was Hofkapellmeister of the orchestra at the Opera in Darmstadt. He finally served as the first Chief Music Director of the Philharmonisches Staatsorchester Mainz from 1877 to 1909. In 1893 he conducted Wagner's Tristan und Isolde and Siegfried at the Royal Opera House at Covent Garden in London, to unenthusiastic reviews. He died in Mainz in 1919.

His compositional output consists of orchestral works, chamber music, and songs.

== Sources ==
- Kuratorium Meiningen: Stadtlexikon Meiningen, Bielsteinverlag Meiningen, 2008. ISBN 978-3-9809504-4-2
