= Henny Wolff =

German singer and music educator

- Henny Wolff, in the 1940s
- Born: 3 February 1896; Cologne, Germany
- Died: 29 January 1965 (aged 68); Hamburg, Germany
- Education: Cologne Conservatory
- Occupations: Classical soprano; Academic teacher
- Organizations: Bonn Conservatory; Musikhochschule Hamburg
- Awards: Johannes Brahms Medal

Henny Wolff (3 February 1896 (Note: The year 1890, which can be found on some web pages, seems to be a reading or printing error.) – 29 January 1965) was a German soprano concert singer and voice teacher. She made an international career, known for performing music by Bach and Handel, but also performing contemporary classical music. Composers wrote music for her and performed with her, such as Hermann Reutter. She was a voice teacher at the Bonn Conservatory, in Berlin, and from 1950 to 1964 at the Musikhochschule Hamburg. She was awarded the city's Johannes Brahms Medal.

== Life ==
Wolff was born in Cologne, the daughter of Karl Wolff, chief editor and music critic of the journal Kölner Tageblatt, and Henriette Dwillat, a concert singer and voice teacher. She studied with her mother, then at the conservatory of her hometown from 1906 to 1912, and in Berlin with Julius von Raatz-Brockmann. She made her debut in a concert at the Gürzenich in Cologne in 1912. She then performed both in Germany and internationally, especially with works by Johann Sebastian Bach and George Frideric Handel. She was open to contemporary music. She often sang lieder by Hermann Reutter, with the composer as the accompanist. Ernst-Lothar von Knorr dedicated four songs to her in 1943, on lyrics by Friedrich Hölderlin, Friedrich Nietzsche, Rainer Maria Rilke and Stefan George.

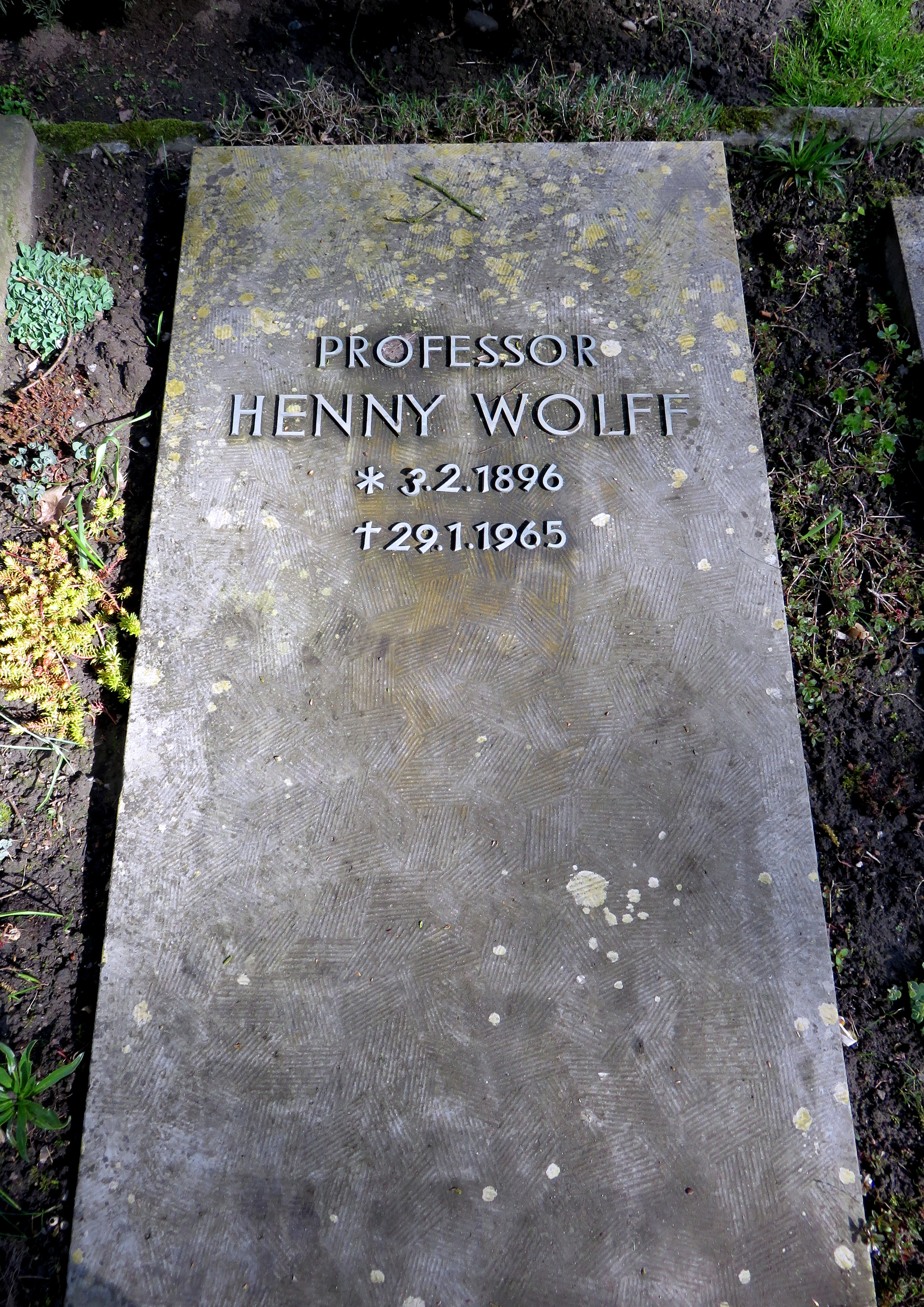
Gravestone in the Garten der Frauen, Hamburg

Wolff was a voice teacher at the Bonn Conservatory from 1914 to 1916. She moved to Berlin in 1922, where she also worked as a voice pedagogue. After World War II, she moved to Hamburg. She served as a voice instructor at the first Ferienkurse für internationale neue Musik in Darmstadt in 1946, and presented lieder by Gustav Mahler, Ernst Krenek and Reutter. Wolff was a voice teacher at the Musikhochschule Hamburg from 1950, when it was founded, to 1964, as a professor from 1952. She was awarded the Johannes Brahms Medal from the city of Hamburg in 1958, on the occasion of the composer's 125th anniversary. Among her students were Judith Beckmann, Ingeborg Reichelt and Elisabeth Schärtel.

She died in Hamburg on 29 January 1965. She was buried on the Hauptfriedhof Ohlsdorf. When the grave site expired, her remains were transferred to the Garten der Frauen, a memorial site for women.
