= Hans Rott =

Austrian composer (1858–1884)

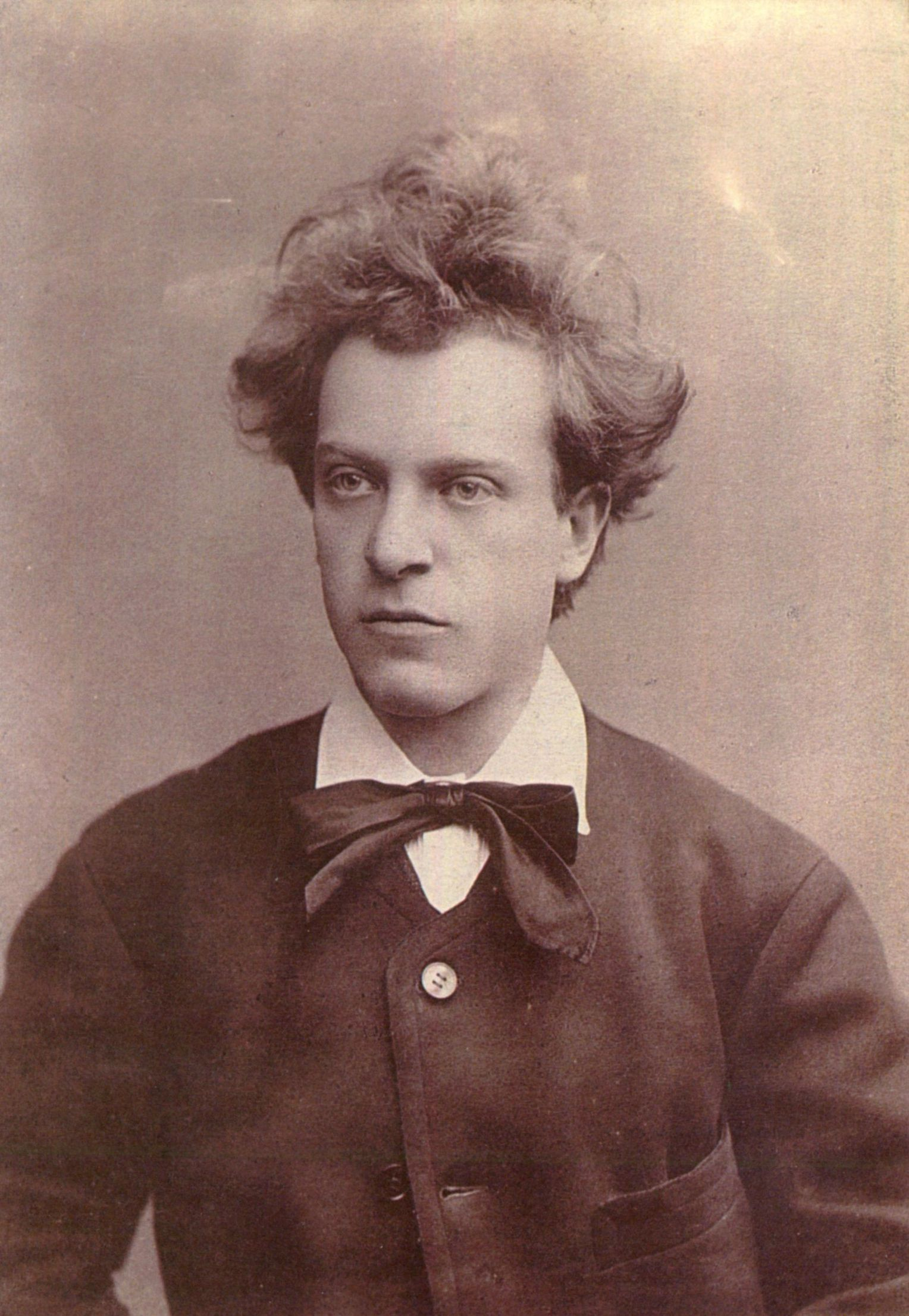
- Hans Rott before 1884
- Born: Johann Nepomuk Karl Maria Rott; 1 August 1858; Vienna, Austrian Empire
- Died: 25 June 1884 (aged 25); Vienna, Austria-Hungary
- Occupations: Composer; Organist
- Works: List of compositions

Johann Nepomuk Karl Maria Rott (1 August 1858 – 25 June 1884) was an Austrian composer and organist. His music is little-known today, though he received high praise in his time from Gustav Mahler and Anton Bruckner. He left a symphony and Lieder, among other works.

== Life ==
Rott was born in Braunhirschengrund, a suburb of Vienna. His mother Maria Rosalia (1840–1872; née Lutz) was an actress and singer. His father Carl Mathias Rott, who married her in 1862 (born 1807; né Roth), was a famous comic actor in Vienna who was crippled in 1874 by a stage accident which led to his death two years later.

=== Studies ===
Hans was left alone to continue his studies at the Conservatory. Fortunately, both his skill and financial need were recognized and he was excused from paying tuition. While studying, he briefly roomed with Gustav Mahler and Rudolf Krzyzanowski. He studied piano with Leopold Landskron and Josef Dachs, harmony with Hermann Graedener, counterpoint and composition—like Mahler—with Franz Krenn.

He studied organ with Bruckner, starting in 1874, and graduating from Bruckner's organ class in 1877, with honors. Bruckner said that Rott played Bach very well, and even improvised wonderfully (a high compliment since Bruckner himself was a great improviser). Rott was also influenced by the works of Wagner; he attended the very first Bayreuth Festival in 1876.

=== Compositions ===
During that time, Rott was also organist at the Piarist church "Maria Treu" in Vienna. For the final year of his studies in 1878, Rott submitted the first movement of his Symphony in E major to a composition contest. The jury, except for Bruckner, was very derisive about the work. After completing the Symphony in 1880, Rott showed the work to both Brahms and Hans Richter, in order to get it played. His efforts failed. Brahms did not like the fact that Bruckner exerted great influence on the Conservatory students, and even told Rott that he had no talent whatsoever and that he should give up music. Unfortunately, Rott lacked Mahler's inner resolve, and whereas Mahler was able to overcome many of the obstacles in his life, Rott was brought down by mental illness.

The symphony has been recorded by the Deutsche Grammophon, BIS, CPO, Acousence, Hyperion, Ondine, RCA, Arte Nova, & Oehms record labels. Hans Rott also wrote a Symphony for String Orchestra in A♭ major, in three movements, (1874–75), and a String Quartet in C minor, a student work in five movements. They have both been recorded on the Acousence Records label #ACO-CD 20205 (2005).

=== Final years ===
Rott began to evidence persecutory delusions. In October 1880, while on a train journey, he reportedly threatened another passenger with a revolver, claiming that Brahms had filled the train with dynamite. Rott was committed to a mental hospital in 1881, where despite a brief recovery he sank into depression. By the end of 1883 a diagnosis recorded "hallucinatory insanity, persecution mania—recovery no longer to be expected." He died of tuberculosis in 1884, aged 25. Many well-wishers, including Bruckner and Mahler, attended Rott's funeral at the Zentralfriedhof in Vienna.

== Legacy ==
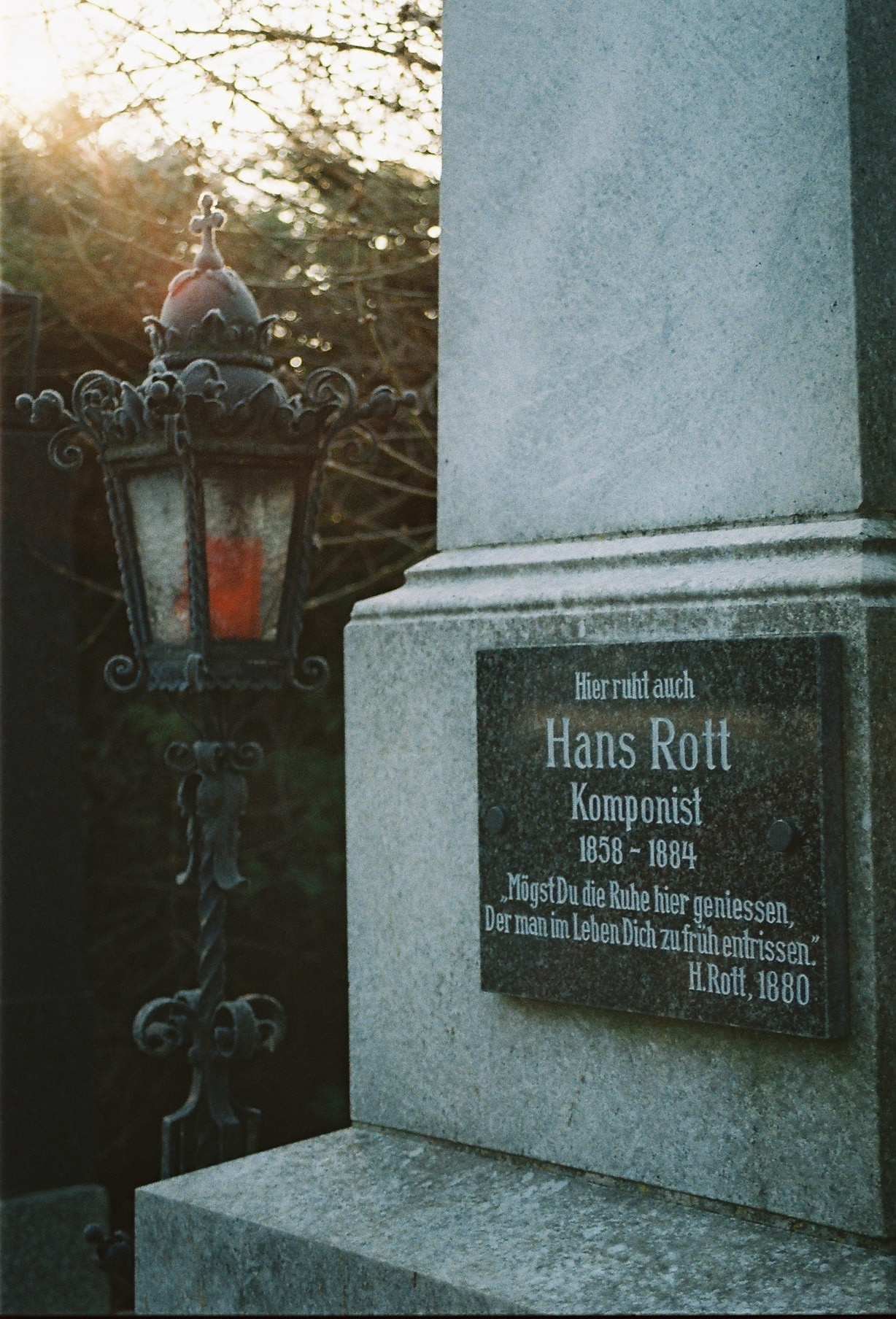
Memorial plaque on the Zentralfriedhof

Mahler wrote of Rott

a musician of genius ... who died unrecognized and in want on the very threshold of his career. ... What music has lost in him cannot be estimated. Such is the height to which his genius soars in ... [his] Symphony [in E major], which he wrote as 20-year-old youth and makes him ... the Founder of the New Symphony as I see it. To be sure, what he wanted is not quite what he achieved. … But I know where he aims. Indeed, he is so near to my inmost self that he and I seem to me like two fruits from the same tree which the same soil has produced and the same air nourished. He could have meant infinitely much to me and perhaps the two of us would have well-nigh exhausted the content of new time which was breaking out for music.

Thanks to Rott's friends, some of his music manuscripts have survived in the music collection of Vienna's national library. This includes Rott's Symphony in E major, and sketches for a second Symphony that was never finished. The completed symphony is remarkable in the way it anticipates some of Mahler's musical characteristics. In particular, the third movement prefigures the second movement of Mahler's First Symphony, as well as Mahler's Second Symphony. The Finale includes references to Brahms's First Symphony. Mahler also spoke well of Rott's Lieder, of which all eight surviving complete songs have been performed in concert since 2002 and four sung by Dominik Wörner were recorded in 2009 on the Ars label. We also know of a Sextet, which Mahler never heard and has also been lost. In his last years, Rott wrote a lot of music, only to destroy what he wrote soon after writing it, saying it was worthless.

Bruckner and Mahler were the first to recognise Rott's talent. Mahler himself included references to Rott's work in his own music. Rott's music was largely forgotten after his death. His Symphony No. 1 in E major was not premiered until 1989; it was played by the Cincinnati Philharmonia Orchestra conducted by Gerhard Samuel, in a performing edition prepared by Paul Banks. A CD recording followed.

Other recordings of the symphony have since been issued, and other Rott works have been occasionally revived, including his Julius Caesar Overture, Pastoral Overture and Prelude for Orchestra.

He figures in the murder mystery Requiem in Vienna by J. Sydney Jones.

=== List of compositions ===
- Symphony in A♭ major for string orchestra (1874–75)
- Menuet in D♭ major for piano (1875)
- Fugue in C minor for piano duet (1876)
- Idyll in D major for piano (1876; incomplete)
- Scherzo in A minor for piano (1876; incomplete)
- Das Abendglöcklein, song for voice and piano (1876)
- Wanderers Nachtlied, song for voice and piano (1876)
- Geistergruß, song in F minor for voice and piano (1876)
- Marsch der Scharwache in C♯ minor for orchestra (1876; incomplete)
- Orchestervorspiel in E major (1876)
- Hamlet-Ouvertüre in A minor for orchestra (1876; incomplete)
- String Quartet in C minor (1876-1877)
- Suite in B♭ major for orchestra (1877; incomplete)
- Ein Vorspiel zu 'Julius Cäsar' in B♭ major for orchestra (1877)
- Suite in E major for orchestra (1878)
- Symphony [No.1] in E major for orchestra (1878–80)
- Der Sänger, song in D major for voice and piano (1880)
- Pastorales Vorspiel in F major for orchestra (1880)
- String Sextet (1880; sketches)
- Symphony [No.2] for orchestra (1880; sketches)

== Recordings ==
- 1989: Hans Rott – Symphonie E-Dur, Cincinnati Philharmonia Orchestra, Gerhard Samuel, Hyperion CDA 66366; reissued in that company's Helios series as CDH55140
- 1992: Hans Rott – Symphonie E-Dur, Norrköping Symphony Orchestra, Leif Segerstam, BIS CD-563
- 1997: Hans Rott - Symfonie in E, Radio Filharmonisch Orkest, Jac van Steen, ZOC9702
- 2002: Hans Rott – Symphonie E-Dur / Pastorales Vorspiel, Radio-Symphonieorchester Wien, Dennis Russell Davies, cpo 999 854-2
- 2002: Hans Rott – Symphonie in E-Dur, Philharmonia Hungarica, Christoph Campestrini
- 2003: Hans Rott – Symphonie E-Dur, Orchestre National de Montpellier, Friedemann Layer, AT 2001
- 2004: Hans Rott – Symphonie Nr. 1 E-Dur / Orchestervorspiel E-Dur / Ein Vorspiel zu "Julius Cäsar", Münchner Rundfunkorchester, Sebastian Weigle, ARTE NOVA Classics 82876 57748 2
- 2004: Hans Rott – Symphonie Nr. 1 E-Dur, Philharmonisches Orchester des Staatstheaters Mainz, Catherine Rückwardt, acousence ACO-CD20104
- 2005: Hans Rott – Suite in E-Dur / Gustav Mahler – »Titan«, Philharmonisches Orchester Hagen, Antony Hermus, acousence ACO-CD 20305
- 2005: Hans Rott – Symphonie für Streichorchester / Streichquartett c-Moll, Philharmonisches Orchester des Staatstheaters Mainz, Enrico Delamboye, Mainzer Streichquartett, acousence ACO-CD 20205
- 2012: Hans Rott – Sinfonie Nr. 1 in E-Dur, Suite für Orchester in B-Dur, hr-Sinfonieorchester, Paavo Järvi, RCA Red Seal (Sony Music)
- 2014: Hans Rott – Balde ruhest du auch! (orchestral version by Enjott Schneider), Sinfonie in E-Dur, Münchner Symphoniker, Hansjörg Albrecht, Oehms Classics (OC 1803)
- 2016: Hans Rott - Sinfonie Nr. 1 E-Dur, [Mozarteumorchester Salzburg, Constantin Trinks (Profil Edition Hänssler, PH15051)
- 2020: Hans Rott - Orchestral Works, Vol. 1; Hamlet Overture, Prelude to ‘Julius Caesar’, Suite in E major, Suite in B-flat major, Pastoral Prelude in F major, Orchestral Prelude in E major, Gürzenich Orchester Köln, Christopher Ward (conductor), Capriccio
- 2021: Hans Rott: Symphony No. 1, Bamberger Symphoniker, Jakub Hrůša (conductor), Deutsche Grammophon
