= Rami Bar-Niv =

Israeli musical artist

Rami Bar-Niv רמי בר־ניב
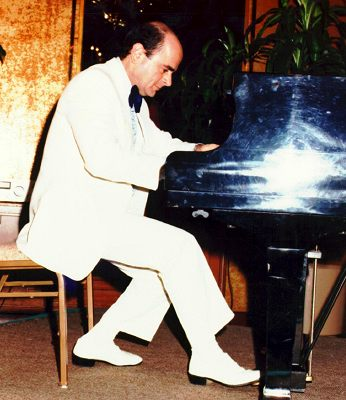

Background information
- Born: December 1, 1945 (age 80); Tel Aviv, Mandatory Palestine
- Occupations: Pianist, composer
- Instrument: Piano

Rami Bar-Niv (Hebrew: רמי בר־ניב; born December 1, 1945) is an Israeli pianist, composer and author.

== Life and career ==
Bar-Niv is a graduate of the Rubin Academy of Music in Tel Aviv, where he studied piano with Karol Klein and composition with Paul Ben-Haim, Alexander Boskovitch, and Ödön Pártos. He won a grant from the America-Israel Cultural Foundation in 1966 to continue his studies at Mannes College of Music in the United States, where he studied with Nadia Reisenberg and with the theorist Carl Schachter. During the summer of 1968, Bar-Niv studied with duo pianists Vronsky & Babin. In 1970, William Gunther asked Rami Bar-Niv to replace him in the First Piano Quartet.

Bar-Niv has performed in concerts worldwide. In 1974, he performed Mozart's Piano Concerto No. 23 with the Israel Philharmonic Orchestra, conducted by Paul Paray. He presented a series of violin and piano recitals with Shlomo Mintz in Israel, and has performed extensively with various chamber ensembles in Israel and abroad.

He was the first Israeli musician to perform in Egypt after the 1979 peace treaty with Israel, and in 1989, received the annual "Best Performer Award" from the Israeli government.

Bar-Niv's compositions have been published by the Israel Music Institute, Israel Music Publications, AndreA, and Or-Tav Publication.

In 2012, Bar-Niv published his first book The Art of Piano Fingering – Traditional, Advanced, and Innovative.

Tim Page of the New York Times described Bar-Niv's New York City performance of Shostakovich's first piano concerto as "flamboyant and effective". He has recorded a number of records for CBS and other labels, both as soloist and as a chamber player. One of them is the only piano recording of the complete "Little Notebook for Anna Magdalena Bach".
