= Josef Dachs =

Austrian pianist and teacher (1825–1896)

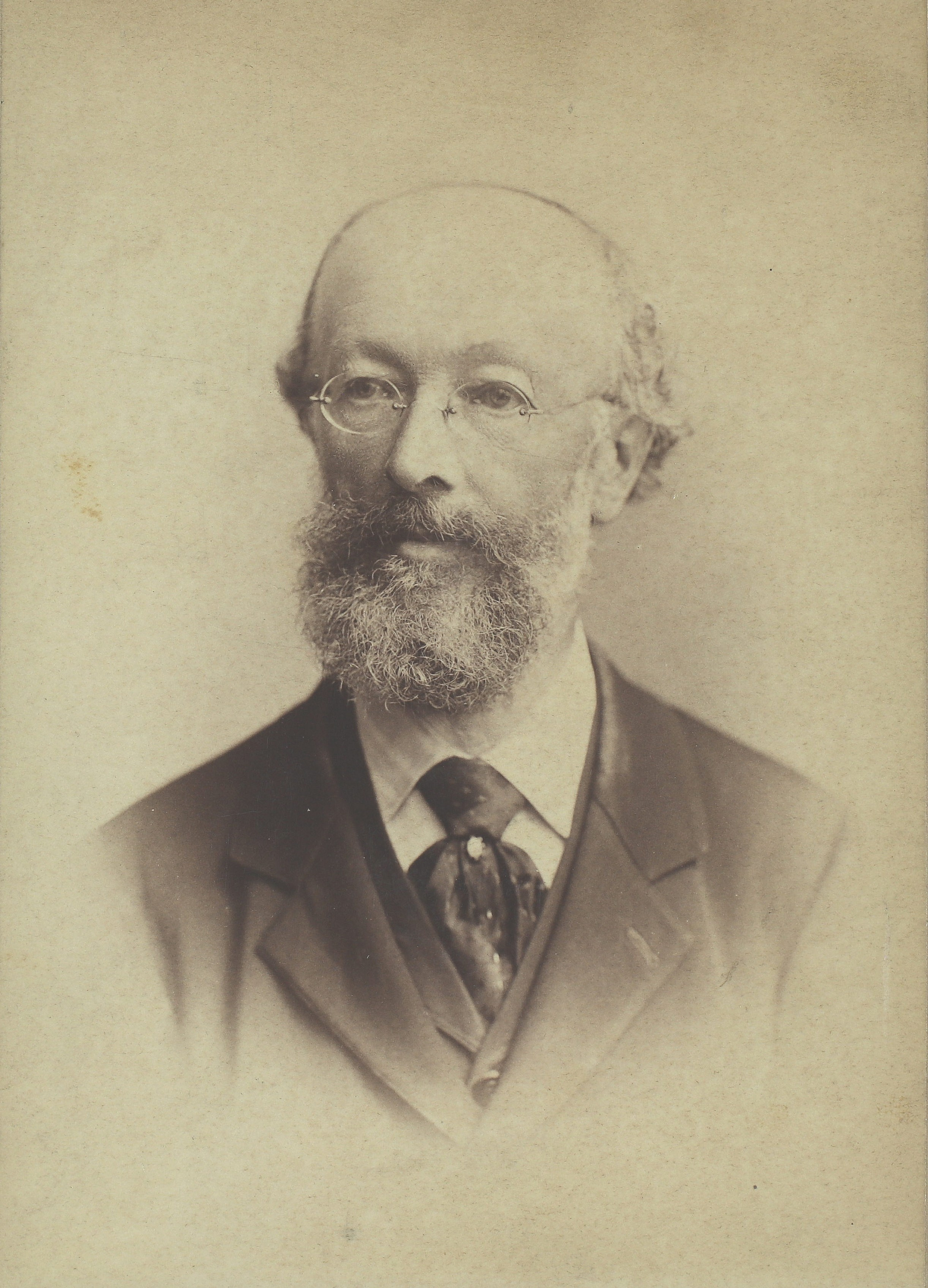
Photograph of Dachs by Josef Löwy, 1896

Josef Dachs (30 September, 1825 – 6 June, 1896) was an Austrian pianist and music teacher born in Regensburg. He received his music education from Simon Sechter and Carl Czerny, worked as the concert pianist and premiered many of his own works. He became professor at the Vienna Conservatory in 1850. Among others, he taught Vladimir de Pachmann, Isabelle Vengerova, Hugo Wolf, Ferdinand Löwe and Russian pianist and composer Josef Rubinstein (1847–1884). Hans Rott composed a work for string orchestra, Dachs-Studien, the main melodic theme of which is based on the letters D A C H S. Dachs died in Vienna.

Dachs appeared under Franz Liszt's baton at the inaugural concert of the Mozart Centenary Festival in Vienna on 27 January, 1856 (the exact centenary of Mozart's birth), as soloist in Mozart's Piano Concerto no. 24 in C minor (K.491). The performance was attended by Emperor Franz Joseph I and Empress Elisabeth of Austria. Robert Volkmann dedicated his Konzertstück for piano and orchestra, op. 42, to Dachs.
