= Hermann Rauhe =

German musicologist and music educator

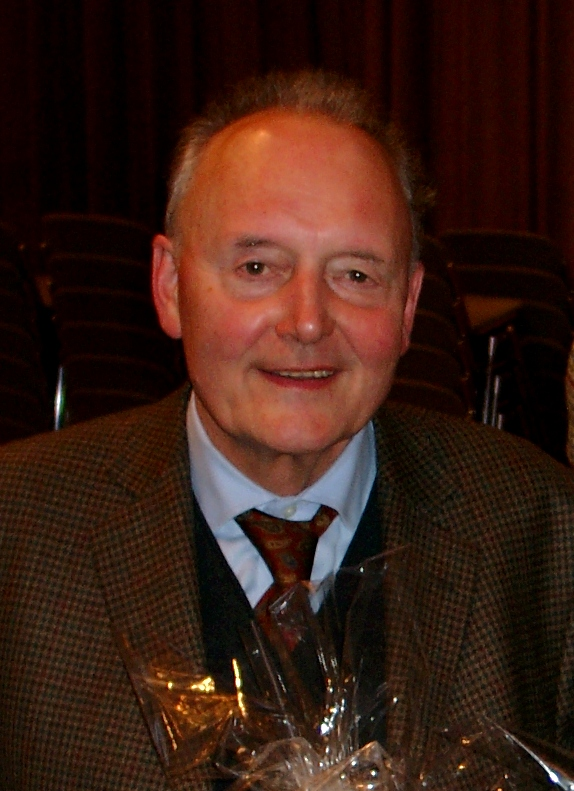
Hermann Rauhe 2004

Hermann Rauhe (born 6 March 1930) is a German musicologist.

== Life ==
Rauhe was born in Wanna/Niederelbe. After he passed the Abitur at the Amandus-Abendroth-Gymnasium in Cuxhaven in 1949, he studied music and music education at the Hochschule für Musik und Theater Hamburg as well as musicology and literary criticism, pedagogy, philosophy, sociology, theology and phonetics at the University of Hamburg from 1951 to 1959. In 1955 he passed the First State Examination for the teaching profession at grammar schools with the combined subject music and German teaching. In 1959 he passed the Second State Examination and then the doctorate of philosophy (musicology).

== Scientific career ==
In 1960 Rauhe became an assistant, in 1963 a lecturer at the University of Hamburg and since 1965 he has been a professor of musicology and music education at the Hamburg University of Music. In 1970 he returned to the University of Hamburg as Ordinarius for Educational Science with a focus on Music Pedagogy. From 1978 to 2004 Rauhe was President of the Hamburg University of Music and Drama, and from 1980 to 1982 also Chairman of the Rectors' Conference of the Universities of Music in the Federal Republic of Germany.

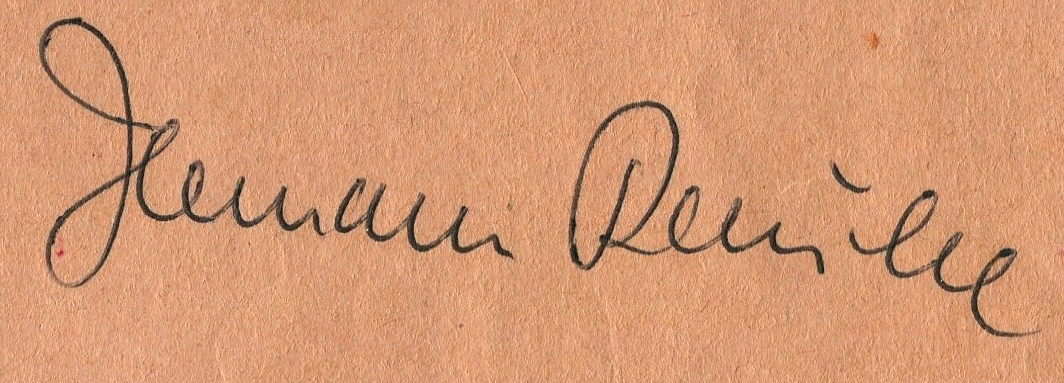
Signature of Hermann Rauhe

== Main areas of work ==
Rauhe made special efforts to develop new methods of Music therapy Impact research. For example, through the targeted use of music in the neurological rehabilitation of stroke and Parkinson patients at the Asklepios Klinikum Harburg (together with the neurologist Robert-Charles Behrend). For this reason, Rauhe works in the German Society for Preventive Medicine and Prevention Management e.V.. Together with its president Gerd Schnack, Rauhe developed a special method of stress reduction, the so-called repetitive meditation training.

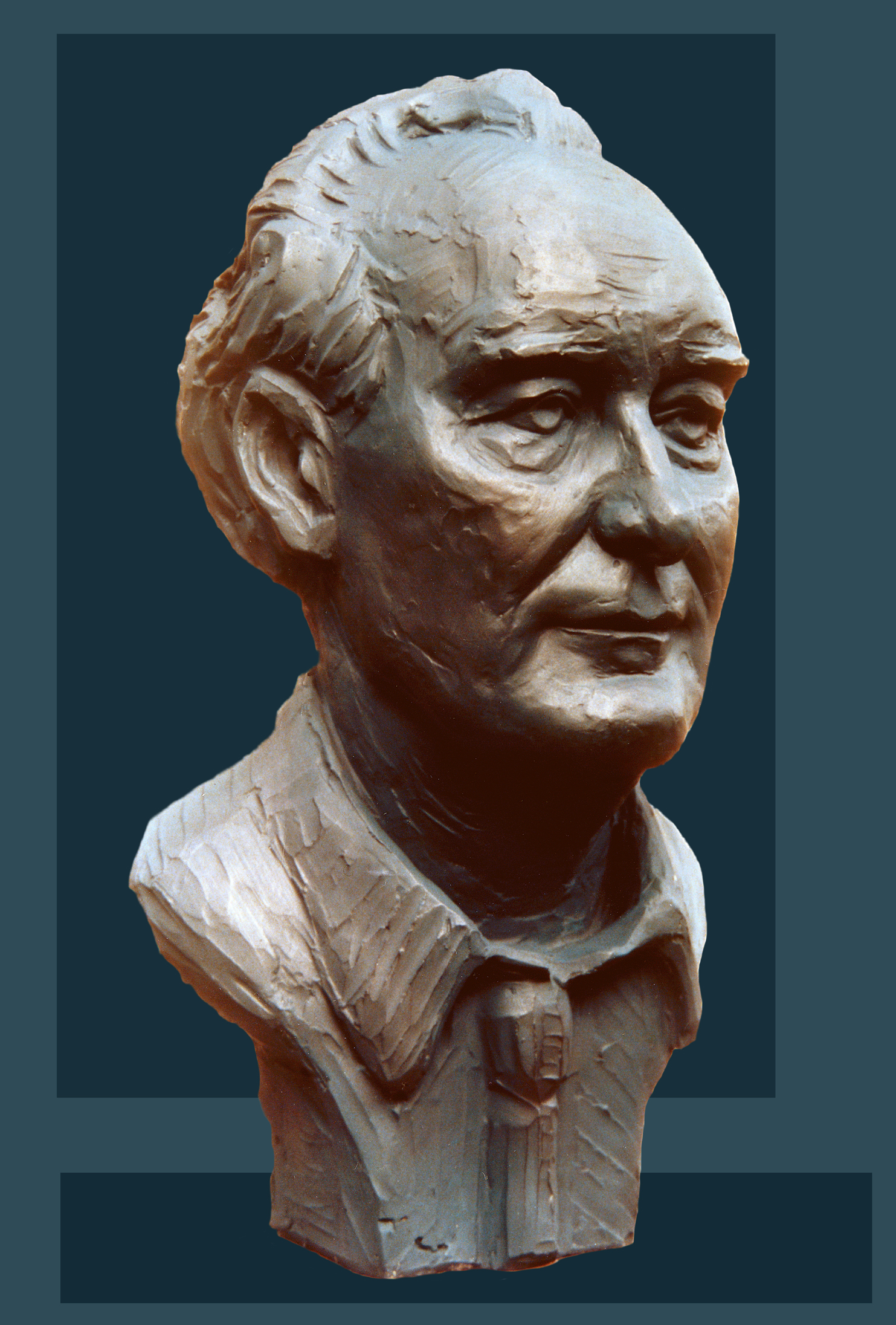
Bronze bust of Hermann Rauhe

He also worked in the field of professional research and development ("Music professions in transition").

== Honours ==
- Since 2004, Rauhe has been Honorary President of the Hamburg University of Music and Theatre
- 2004 Johannes Brahms Medal
- 2006 Officer's Cross of the Order of Merit of the Federal Republic of Germany.
- 2015 Medaille für Kunst und Wissenschaft

== Publications ==
- Dichtung und Musik im weltlichen Vokalwerk Johann Hermann Scheins. Stilistische und kompositionstechnische Untersuchungen zum Wort-Ton-Verhältnis im Lichte der rhetorisch ausgerichteten Sprach- und Musiktheorie des 17. Jahrhunderts. Hamburg 1959.
- Popularität in der Musik. Interdisziplinäre Aspekte musikalischen Kommunikation. Verlag Braun, Karlsruhe 1974, ISBN 3-7650-7463-2.
- with Hans-Peter Reinecke and Wilfried Ribke: Hören und Verstehen. Theorie und Praxis handlungsorientierten Unterrichts. Kösel-Verlag, Munich 1975, ISBN 3-466-30136-X.
- Musik hilft heilen. Arcis-Verlag, München 1993, ISBN 3-89075-056-7.
- with Reinhard Flender: Schlüssel zur Musik. Atlantis-Musikbuch-Verlag, Mainz 1998, ISBN 3-254-08372-5.
- with Gerd Schnack: Topfit durch Nichtstun. RMT – die Formel für optimale Energie. Kösel-Verlag, Munich 2002, ISBN 3-466-34446-8.
