= Karl Maria Zwißler =

German conductor (1900–1984)

- Born: 12 August 1900; Ludwigshafen am Rhein, German Empire
- Died: 15 September 1984 (aged 84); Mainz, West Germany
- Occupations: Conductor; Intendant; Academic
- Organizations: Bavarian State Opera; Frankfurt Opera; Staatstheater Mainz; Musikhochschule Stuttgart; Musikhochschule Frankfurt

Karl Maria Zwißler (12 August 1900 – 15 September 1984) was a German conductor, and academic. He was for decades the Generalmusikdirektor and Intendant of the Staatstheater Mainz. He taught conducting at the music universities of Stuttgart and Frankfurt.

== Career ==
Born in Ludwigshafen am Rhein, Zwißler studied at the music universities of Heidelberg and Munich from 1920 to 1924, and the following year at the Akademie der Künste in Berlin. Among his teachers were Bernhard Sekles, Hans Knappertsbusch, Hans Pfitzner and Erich Kleiber, among others. From 1924 he was Kapellmeister at the Bavarian State Opera. Three years later he went as conductor to the Deutsche Oper (German Opera) in Brno, followed by Düsseldorf and Darmstadt.

In 1933, he became First Kapellmeister at the Frankfurt Opera, and two years later musical director. A year later, he was Generalmusikdirektor and Hofkapellmeister of the Philharmonisches Staatsorchester Mainz at the Staatstheater Mainz. In these years, he conducted works by Igor Stravinsky, although the composer's works were regarded as Entartete Musik (degenerate music): the suite from Petrushka, the Symphony of Psalms, a production of the ballet The Firebird, and the German premiere of the concerto Dumbarton Oaks. He became Intendant in Mainz in 1942. After World War II, he was Generalintendant.

From 1956, Zwißler taught at the Hochschule für Musik und Darstellende Kunst Stuttgart. From 1958, he taught conducting at the Hochschule für Musik und Darstellende Kunst Frankfurt am Main, and was appointed professor a year later. Among his students was Alois Ickstadt. Zwißler retired from the Mainz Theatre in 1966. He died in Mainz.
