= Franz Mittler =

American classical composer

Franz Mittler (April 14, 1893 in Vienna – December 28, 1970 in Munich) was an Austrian (and later on an American) composer, musician, and humorist.

== Life and work ==
Mittler was born in Vienna. His maternal grandmother financed his earliest musical education which started out under Mr. Deutsch and later Oscar Stock (violin). His first public performance took place in 1902 when he performed the Schubert Sonatina in D D. 384 with the then 7-year-old Clara Haskil. In 1904 he moved from the violin to the pursuit of piano where his teacher became Theodor Leschetizky. He studied theory with Joseph Labor (also teacher of Julius Bittner and Arnold Schoenberg), later composition with Richard Heuberger and Karl Prohaska. From these teachers, Mittler attained his neo-Brahmsian style. Further studies included Fritz Steinbach and Carl Friedberg at the Vienna University and the Conservatory in Cologne. He also studied with Heinrich Schenker.

In 1913 Mittler volunteered for a one-year stint in the Imperial and Royal Austrian Army in the supply and logistics division. As sub-lieutenant his military duties included the supervision of a bread-baking unit during all of World War I. During that time he came near the Russian front in Poland, and was stationed in Serbia. After the war, Mittler also studied singing (with a Romanian mezzo by the name of Mme. Munteanu) and later, still, guitar, before he returned to the violin again.

He composed several smaller works during the pre-war years in Vienna, including his Schumannesque "Phantasiestück opus 5 for Piano, and a Richard Strauss influenced cycle of "Four Songs opus 6 for Medium Voice and Piano". Universal published Mittler's "Marienbildchen opus 7 No. 1 for Soprano and Piano" which a contemporary review called "a charming small idyll, full of modern harmonic piquanteries", hinting at a harmonic style roughly reflecting that of Gustav Mahler. His First String Quartet from 1909 also falls into that time, and it shows the great talent and ability of the then 16-year-old Mittler. The parts and score to String Quartet Nos. 1 and 3, his Cello Sonata (1910), as well as his Op. 3 Piano Trio were recently published by Edition Silvertrust (2008-9).

Around 1940, Mittler was one of the four pianists who organized the First Piano Quartet. He stayed with the group until the 1950s.

His daughter, Diana Mittler-Battipaglia, is a music teacher and pianist.

== Notable works ==
- String Quartet No. 1 (1909)
- Sonata in G Major for Violin & Piano (1910)
- Piano Trio, Op. 3 (1911)
- String Quartet No. 3 (1915–18)
- Three Character Pieces for Piano (1912–26)
- Chaconne for Solo Violin, Op. 10 (1926)

== Sources ==
- Franz Mittler - Austro-Hungarian Composer, Musician, and Humorous Poet by Diana Mittler-Battipaglia, Volume 8 Austrian Culture (Harry Zahn, General Editor), Peter Lang Publishing (New York - Vienna, 1992) ISBN 0-8204-2063-8
