= Peter Maag =

Swiss conductor

Ernst Peter Johannes Maag (10 May 1919 – 16 April 2001) was a Swiss conductor.

== Early life ==
Peter Maag was born on 10 May 1919 in St. Gallen, Switzerland and died on 16 April 2001 in Verona, Italy.

His father, Otto, was a Lutheran minister, and his mother, Nelly, a violinist who performed in the Capet Quartet as second violinist. His great uncles were conductors Emil and Fritz Steinbach. Peter attended the universities of Zürich, Basel, and Geneva. He was mentored by Karl Barth and Emil Brunner in theology, and Karl Jaspers in philosophy. He studied piano and theory with Czesław Marek in Zürich and received further training on piano with Alfred Cortot in Paris. His conducting mentors were Ernest Ansermet, Wilhelm Furtwängler, and Franz von Hoesslin.

== Career ==
=== Association with Furtwängler ===
Maag described his association with Wilhelm Furtwängler to be the most important in his life. He performed as pianist in a Furtwängler concert with Beethoven's Piano Concerto No. 4 in G major. As recounted by Maag, Furtwängler told him: "Why don't you try to conduct? I have observed you while you were playing the concert tonight, staring at the orchestra more than at the keyboard. It was more you than me that have given the entry." He followed Furtwängler's advice to start out at a small theatre. His new career began as répétiteur and then director at the Swiss Theater Biel-Solothurn from 1943 to 1946. After the first season at Biel-Solothurn, he served as an assistant to Furtwängler prior to the opening of his second season there. After Biel-Solothurn, he became Ernest Ansermet's assistant with the Orchestre de la Suisse Romande.

=== Conductor ===
Maag was first conductor at the Düsseldorf Opera from 1952 to 1955, and then Generalmusikdirektor of the Bonn City Theater from 1955 to 1959. His first appearance at the Royal Opera House Covent Garden was in 1959, with Mozart's Die Zauberflöte. In the same year he made his debut at the Glyndebourne Festival Opera in Mozart's Le nozze di Figaro. His U.S. debut was as guest conductor in 1959 of the Minneapolis Symphony Orchestra, and he made his U.S. opera debut in 1961 at the Lyric Opera of Chicago with Mozart's Così fan tutte.

=== Religious retreat ===
In 1962, Maag temporarily abandoned his musical career. Believing he was losing touch with music and theology, he sought guidance first from the Greek Orthodox Church and then planned to spend a few months at a Buddhist monastery near Hong Kong. "I decided it was time to retire because I was having too much success," Maag said. The planned "few months" grew to over two years. "Those two years spent meditating and praying in a small cell purified my soul.”

=== Return to conducting ===
Maag was the chief conductor of the Vienna Volksoper from 1964 to 1968. His Metropolitan Opera debut was made on 23 September 1972 with Mozart's Don Giovanni. He became artistic director of the Teatro Regio di Parma in 1972 and of the Teatro Regio in Turin in 1974. He held posts at the RAI Symphony Orchestra, Turin and the Orquesta Nacional de España. He was the music director of the Berner Symphonie-Orchester from 1984 to 1991. He served as the principal conductor of the [[[Orchestra di Padova e del Veneto]] [[[:it:[Orchestra di Padova e del Veneto|it]]] from 1983 to 2001. He was also a frequent guest conductor with orchestras and opera houses worldwide.

=== Recordings ===
He began recording for Decca Records in October 1950 with the Orchestre de la Suisse Romande. These monaural recordings included Mozart's Symphony No. 29 and Symphony No. 34 and Serenade No. 9 "Posthorn".

Maag's early stereophonic sound recordings for Decca were well received, and many have remained in the catalogs for decades. The original LPs, particularly with the London Symphony Orchestra, have become collector's items. He began recording with the London Symphony Orchestra in February 1957. This included a series of Mendelssohn and Mozart works, and the Schumann Piano Concerto. Maag’s favorite recordings came from this association: Mozart’s Symphony No. 29 and Symphony No. 34. His recording from this period of Mendelssohn's Symphony No. 3 (the "Scottish" symphony) was widely admired, and Maag came to be particularly associated with the piece.

Maag also recorded two LPs with the Orchestre de la Société des Concerts du Conservatoire in November 1958 with works of Chopin, Delibes, and Rossini.

For Decca he also recorded Verdi's Luisa Miller with the National Philharmonic Orchestra in June 1975 and Paer's Leonora with the Bavarian Symphony Orchestra (likely the Bavarian State Orchestra) in June and July 1978.

With the Berner Symphonie-Orchester of which he was Music Director, Maag made recordings for Innovative Music Productions in the late 1980s. They were licensed to MCA Records for sale in the USA.

Other labels he recorded for include Arts, Conifer, Deutsche Grammophon, Naxos Records, Nuova Era, RCA Red Seal Records, and Vox Records.

== Personal life ==
Maag's first wife was Jasmina Božin, a stage designer from Bosnia-Herzegovina. Maag was survived by his second wife, Marica Franchi (Marika); a son Georg, a writer of children's books, and a daughter Costanza, from his second wife.

== Awards ==
- Toscanini Medal (1968)
- Verdi Medal (1973)
- Toscanini Presentation Baton (1975)

== Legacy ==
In memory of Peter Maag, an international competition for young conductors has been established, in conjunction with the Orchestra di Padova e del Veneto. The first edition was held from 14 to 17 June 2023, with some 17 candidates selected to participate. The winner was Sieva Borzak.

The second edition was held coinciding with the 2026 Winter Olympics, with the final concert on 19 February 2026 and announcement of results at Padua in the Auditorium Pollini. The finalists were Matteo Chiodini (who was awarded the Special Prize of the Orchestra and the Special Audience Prize), Lorenzo Di Giosaffatte and Emanuele Marino, but the Primo premio Peter Maag was not awarded.
