= Fritz Steinbach =

German conductor and composer (1855–1916)

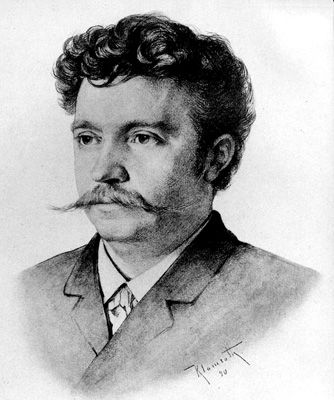
Fritz Steinbach

Fritz Steinbach (17 June 1855 – 13 August 1916) was a German conductor and composer who was particularly associated with the works of Johannes Brahms.

Born in Grünsfeld, he was the brother of conductor Emil Steinbach. He studied at the Leipzig Conservatory and in Vienna. Among his teachers were Martin Gustav Nottebohm and Anton Door. In 1886, he succeeded Richard Strauss as the conductor of the Meiningen Court Orchestra. He remained there until 1902, during which time he often collaborated with Brahms and gave frequent guest performances at the court of Georg II, Duke of Saxe-Meiningen. From 1898 to 1901, he was President of the Allgemeiner Deutscher Musikverein. He was the music director of the Gürzenich Orchestra in Cologne from 1902 to 1914. He served as the director of the Lower Rhenish Music Festival in 1904, 1907, 1910, and 1913. He taught conducting at the Cologne Conservatory where his pupils included Adolf Busch (in composition), Fritz Busch (in conducting), Allard de Ridder, Karl Elmendorff, Hans Knappertsbusch, Franz Mittler, Karl Aagard Østvig, Albert van Raalte and Erwin Schulhoff. His pupil Walter Blume continued his researches into Brahms. See: List of music students by teacher: R to S#Fritz Steinbach.

Steinbach met Johannes Brahms in 1875, and the two maintained a relationship until Brahms's death; Steinbach's performances of Brahms's music repeatedly won praise from the composer. Although Steinbach performed music by composers such as Bach, Beethoven, Mahler, and Reger, he was most prominently associated with Brahms, influencing younger conductors such as Arturo Toscanini and Adrian Boult. In general, Steinbach's conducting favored the Classical, rhythm-focused style of Hans Richter over the Romantic, lyrically-driven style of conductors such as Arthur Nikisch, although Steinbach's flexibility of tempo also attracted admirers.

He died in Munich. He was the great-uncle of Peter Maag.

== Sources ==
- Kuratorium Meiningen: Stadtlexikon Meiningen, Bielsteinverlag Meiningen, 2008. ISBN 978-3-9809504-4-2
