= Philharmonisches Staatsorchester Mainz =

German symphony orchestra

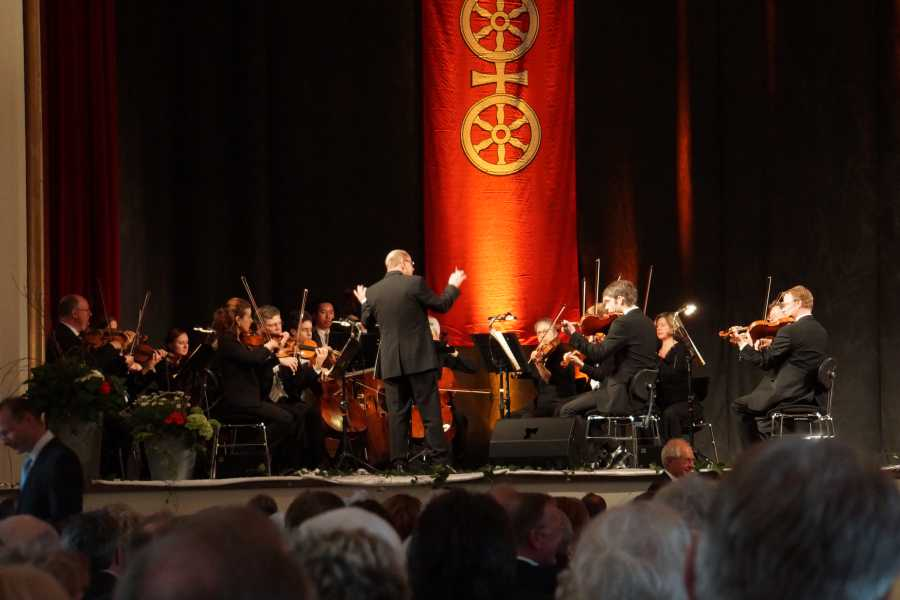
String orchestra of the Philharmonisches Staatsorchester Mainz performing at the inauguration of Michael Ebling as Lord Mayor of Mainz.

The Philharmonisches Staatsorchester Mainz (lit. Philharmonic State Orchestra of Mainz), is the resident orchestra of the Staatstheater Mainz. In addition to musical theatre and Tanztheater, youth symphony and chamber concerts are part of the activity of the orchestra. It is one of the three state symphony orchestras of Rhineland-Palatinate. From 2011 to 2025, Hermann Bäumer was principal conductor.

== History ==
=== 16th and 17th century ===
Under Cardinal Elector Albert of Mainz, who obtained the Electorate of Mainz in 1514, and in 1518 was made a cardinal at the age of 28, the orchestra is first mentioned as electoral court orchestra. The first verifiable conductor, Jan le Febure took up its duties at the Mainz court in 1601. In the following years the musical arrangement of numerous imperial coronations is evident, whereby the Mainz electoral court orchestra already gained early supraregional recognition. For example the orchestra performed in 1612 during the coronation of Matthias, Holy Roman Emperor. At the beginning of the 18th century, Elector Lothar Franz von Schönborn initiated the formation of a secular orchestra. This included the extension of the strings by woodwinds and horns. Elector von Schönborn was also setting records in the form of a decree to introduce a court musician.

=== 18th and 19th century ===
In 1777, a size of 35 members of the orchestra is documented. The first permanent theater in Mainz was built in 1760. Elector Emmerich Joseph von Breidbach zu Bürresheim allowed his musicians to participate in opera performances in this theater. Thus, the orchestra was now categorized as an opera orchestra. Only a few years later, elector Emmerich Joseph erected an Electoral Comedy House (Kürfürstliches Komödienhaus) at the avenue “Große Bleiche”. He subsidized the musical performances and made his band available for the opera. In the first musical almanac of 1782, the Mainz court orchestra was now listed among the finest in the territory of today's Germany. The opera itself made its mark during the following years, especially with Mozart's works. For example Mozart's Don Giovanni was performed as a premiere in German language in 1789 in Mainz. Besides the Mozart family grand tour, Mozart stayed several times in Mainz, and gave concerts with the orchestra. The opera flourished in Mainz at the end of the 18th century and was considered one of the best in Germany. The number of employed musicians in the court orchestra increased to 48, which was remarkable for that time. Elector Friedrich Karl Joseph von Erthal had upgraded the theater since the National Theatre. A few years later, during the War of the First Coalition, the comedy house was destroyed during the siege of Mainz (1793). The elector disposed the conversion of his stables to be used for a theater. It serve as a venue for the next 40 years.

With the end of the Electorate of Mainz, hard times began for the musicians. Only a small part of the orchestra remained in Mainz as the theater orchestra under new management. It was directly dependent on the success or failure of the ever-changing theater directors. This changed when in 1804 the circle “United Friends of Music” was founded and gave regular symphonic concerts, inviting important musicians, such as Niccolò Paganini and Franz Liszt.

On 21 September 1833, the curtain in the now newly built theater (today's Staatstheater Mainz) on Gutenberg Square rose for the first time for Carl Maria von Webers 9th "Jubilee Overture" and Mozart's La clemenza di Tito. The plight of the orchestra finally stabilized when the acquisition by the city of Mainz took place in 1876. Under the umbrella of the city authorities the 45 musicians were no longer under direct threat of financial failure of the theater. Under the first urban conductor Emil Steinbach, the Mainz stage was a leading house for Richard Wagner's works. His works were heard in concert as well. On 30 November 1877, the first public performance of Wagner's Siegfried Idyll was performed in Mainz, conducted by Steinbach. The world premiere of Hans Pfitzner's Der arme Heinrich (Poor Henry) on 24 March 1895 was conducted by the composer.

=== 20th and 21st century ===
In 1904, Gustav Mahler's Fourth Symphony was performed. In 1910, Albert Gorter became the new director. Other directors subsequently worked and contributed to the orchestra. Karl Maria Zwißler was Generalmusikdirektor from 1934 to 1966. In the 1980s, the music directors were Mladen Bašić, Peter Erckens, and Stefan Sanderling. In 2001, Catherine Rückwardt became the first female music director of the Mainz Philharmonic Orchestra. In 2006, there was a structural reform. In 2011, Rückwardt was succeeded by Hermann Bäumer as chief conductor of the Philharmonic Orchestra Mainz and also its music director.

== Hofkapellmeister and principal conductors ==
The Hofkapellmeisters and principal conductors of the Philharmonisches Staatsorchester Mainz:

- 1601–1612 Jan le Febure
- 1612–1642 Gabriel Plautz
- 1642–1649 Christoph Neumann
- 1649–1669 Philipp Buchner
- 1669–1691 Paul Baudrechsel
- 1691–1696 Rudolf Danzer
- 1696–1720 Theodor Herold
- 1720–1724 Jakob Zorn
- 1724–1743 Johann Ondracek
- 1745–1756 Jan Zach
- 1756–1787 Johann Michael Schmid
- 1785–1792 Vincenzo Righini
- 1790–1794 Johann August Franz Burgmüller
- 1793–1797 Johann Sterkel
- 1821–1845 Adolph Ganz
- 1847–1852 Carl Ludwig Fischer
- 1857–1859 Richard Genée
- 1859–1862 Friedrich Marpurg
- 1862–1863 Gustav Schmidt
- 1863–1865 Friedrich Marpurg
- 1869–1875 Reinhold Preumayer
- 1877–1910 Emil Steinbach
- 1910–1925 Albert Gorter
- 1924–1926 Paul Breisach
- 1926–1932 Adolf Kienzl
- 1932–1934 Hans Schwieger
- 1934–1936 Karl Fischer
- 1936–1967 Karl Maria Zwißler
- 1967–1974 Helmut Wessel-Therhorn
- 1974–1977 Dietfried Bernet
- 1978–1990 Mladen Bašić
- 1990–1996 Peter Erckens
- 1996–2001 Stefan Sanderling
- 2001–2011 Catherine Rückwardt
- 2011–2025 Hermann Bäumer
- 2025– Gabriel Venzago
