= Kain und Abel =

1914 opera by Felix Weingartner

Kain und Abel is a one-act opera by Austrian conductor and composer Felix Weingartner, who also wrote the libretto. The work was composed in the early 1910s and premiered in 1914 in Darmstadt. After initial success, it disappeared from the repertory following the outbreak of the First World War and remained neglected until it was revived in 2026 at the Staatstheater Darmstadt marking its first staged revival in over a century.

== Background and composition ==
Weingartner conceived Kain und Abel during a period of intensive international activity as both conductor and composer. At the time, he had recently succeeded Gustav Mahler as director of the Vienna Court Opera and was touring extensively with his wife, the soprano Lucille Marcel. The subject of Cain and Abel had occupied Weingartner for many years and was initially influenced by Lord Byron's dramatic poem Cain (1821). In his memoirs, Weingartner emphasized that his final version departed from Byron's philosophical treatment in favor of a more concentrated dramatic structure.

== Libretto ==
Following the example of Richard Wagner, Weingartner wrote his own libretto. Although inspired by Byron's Cain, the text represents a substantial reworking rather than a direct adaptation. The libretto focuses on interpersonal conflict and family relationships and presents the biblical narrative in a dramatic rather than theological framework . The opera is through-composed with no official division to scenes or sections.

== Characters ==
- Adam – (bass-baritone) The first man, marked by longing for the lost paradise
- Eva (Eve) – (mezzo-soprano) Adam's companion, focused on practical survival
- Kain (Cain) – (bass-baritone) Adam and Eva's son
- Abel – (tenor) Kain's brother, son of Adam and his previous companion in a past before the fall, Lilith
- Ada – (soprano) daughter of Adam and Lilith; has children with Kain, but loves Abel
- Lilith – Adam's former companion in heaven, personification or womanhood (off-stage presence)

== Plot ==
The opera takes place on a barren plateau where Adam, Eva, Kain, and Ada live after their expulsion from Eden. Kain has just felled a tree on Eva's instruction in order to repair the family's hut.

Eva and Kain discuss the fallen tree. Kain begins chopping it into pieces, and the sound attracts Adam's attention. Adam recalls the expulsion from Paradise, while Eva challenges his account.

Adam reveals that Abel and Ada are children of his former companion Lilith, whom Eva raised. Kain, who is listening to their conversation, realizes that he alone is Eva's biological son and complains of being overshadowed by his brother.

The argument turns to Kain's relationship with Ada. Adam accuses Kain of having taken her by force and of separating her from Abel, causing Abel to flee their shared home. Kain threatens Adam and leaves.

After Kain's departure, Ada enters, mourns the tree. She explains how she made her woolen garment, a novelty in a world in which cloths made of animal skin were the norm, and expresses her longing for beauty and freedom. Eva announces Abel's return.

Abel arrives and recounts his travels, describing a fertile land. Adam becomes convinced that Abel has rediscovered Paradise and orders a sacrifice.

Eva, Abel, and Ada prepare the altar. Abel brings a burning log, and Adam ignites the fire. Adam recites a prayer and throws weeds into the flames in a ritual purification. The fire collapses, thunder is heard, and a mountain becomes visible in the distance. Adam leads Abel and Ada into the hut, while Eva searches for Kain.

Abel and Ada later meet alone. They sing a long and complex love duet. At the start Ada resists Abel's urging to leave with him to his new promised land, but after much discussion they decide to leave together. Eva and Kain observe them without being noticed. After they depart, Kain realizes that he has lost his axe, addresses the felled tree, he says: "now I know who I felled thee", grab a large branch and follows Ada and Abel. Offstage, Kain kills Abel. He returns, dragging Ada behind him. When Adam asks where his brother is, Kain replies, "I have killed him." The opera ends with these words.

== Musical style and orchestration ==
Kain und Abel is a through-composed one-act opera in a late-Romantic idiom. The score makes extensive use of leitmotif and features large orchestral forces.

Instrumentation: piccolo, 3 flutes, 2 oboes, English horn, heckelphone, 3 bassoons, contrabassoon; 6 horns, 3 trumpets, 1 bass trumpet, 3 trombones, 1 tuba; timpani, bass drum, cymbals, thunder and lightning machine, xylophone; 2 harps, celesta; strings.

== Darmstadt premiere and performance history ==
The opera premiered on 17 May 1914 at the Court Theatre in Darmstadt during Weingartner's tenure as Generalmusikdirektor.

In his autobiography, Lebenserinnerungen, Weingartner writes:

The première of Kain und Abel bore the character of a great gala event. In order to lend the evening a particularly festive tone, I conducted, as the second part, on the stage transformed into a concert hall, my Third Symphony – the sunny counterpart to the sombre drama. Numerous theatre directors, among them also my Viennese successor, Director Gregor, and many critics had arrived. The reports were almost without exception favorable, in many cases even brilliant. Before long, Kain und Abel was acquired for the Vienna Court Opera, the German Provincial Theatre in Prague, and several theatres within the German Reich. Russell placed the work on his Boston repertoire for the coming winter. The directors of the Théâtre de la Monnaie in Brussels likewise accepted it and invited me to conduct it personally. The Paris Figaro devoted an entire page to musical excerpts from the work, and its principal critic – who had come to Darmstadt – undertook the French translation. Finally – I was now recognized not only in Germany, but had also, through a stage creation, entered the international sphere. An appointment was now made public.

— Felix von Weingartner, Lebenserinnerungen

In December 1914 the piece was given its Viennese premiere at the Hoftheater.

The First World War disrupted the opera's dissemination. Planned international performances were cancelled, and the work was not performed again until it was reproduced in 2026 at the Staatstheater Darmstadt, staged by Kerem Hilel and conducted by Daniel Cohen.
