= Heinrich Karl Strohm =

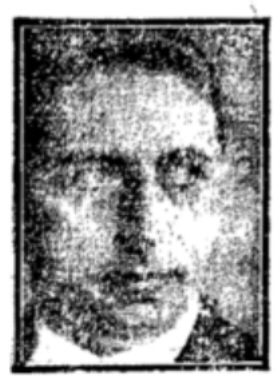
Heinrich Karl Strohm

Heinrich Karl Strohm (4 February 1895 – 9 June 1959) was a German opera manager of the Vienna Staatsoper. He was born in Elberfeld and died, aged 64, in Cologne.
