= Hochschule für Musik und Theater Hamburg =

University of music in Hamburg

Coordinates: 53°34′14″N 9°59′56″E

University of Music and Theatre Hamburg
- Hochschule für Musik und Theater Hamburg
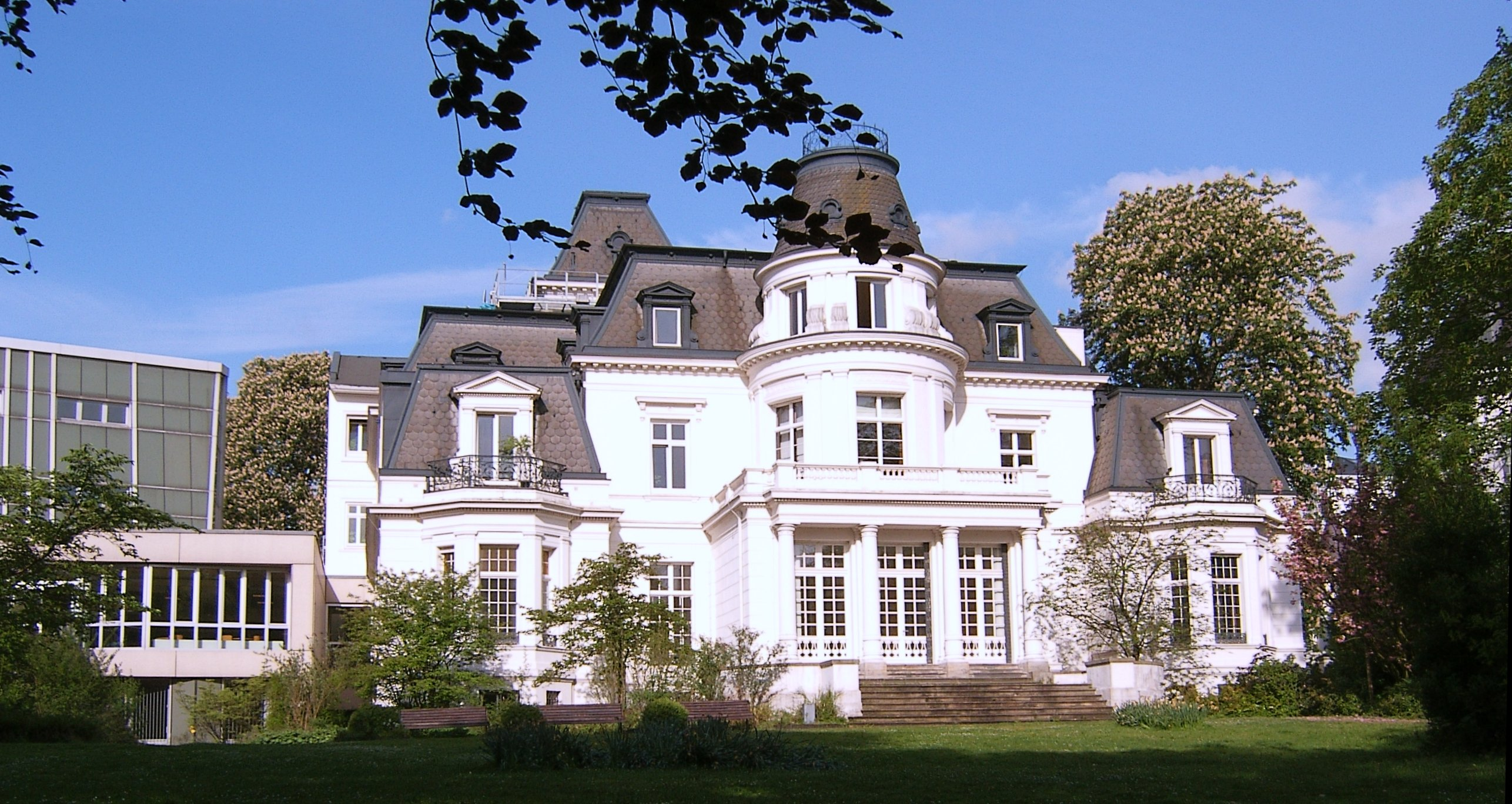
- Hochschule für Musik und Theater; Budge residence
- Former names: State University of Music (Staatliche Hochschule für Musik)
- Type: Public
- Established: 1950
- Students: 750
- Location: Hamburg, Germany
- Website: http://www.hfmt-hamburg.de

The Hochschule für Musik und Theater Hamburg is one of the larger universities of music in Germany.

It was founded in 1950 as Staatliche Hochschule für Musik (Public college of music) on the base of the former private acting school of Annemarie Marks-Rocke and Eduard Marks.

Courses cover various musical genres, including church music, jazz, pop, composition, conducting, instrumental music as well as voice. The theatre academy offers courses in drama and opera and directing in these fields. A third academy offers scientific and educational degrees and qualifications (musicology, music education and therapy).

The university is located in the prestigious Budge-Palais in Hamburg Rotherbaum at the Außenalster, close to the city centre.

== Directors ==
- Philipp Jarnach (1950–59)
- Wilhelm Maler (1959–69)
- Hajo Hinrichs (1969–78)
- Hermann Rauhe (1978–2004)
- Michael von Troschke (April to October 2004)
- Elmar Lampson (since October 2004)

== Faculty ==
- Beatrix Borchard, musicology (from 2002)
- Gordon Kampe, composition (from 2017)
- Margot Guilleaume, voice (1950–78)
- György Ligeti, composition (1973–1988)
- Henny Wolff, voice (1950–1964)
- Heinz Wunderlich, organ (1919–2012)

== History ==
The Hochschule für Musik und Theater Hamburg (HfMT) was founded in 1950 as the Staatliche Hochschule für Musik. It was established on the basis of a private acting school previously operated by Annemarie Marks-Rocke and Eduard Marks. In 1956, the institution moved into the Budge-Palais, a 19th-century building located in Hamburg's Rotherbaum district.

The university expanded its academic scope in the following decades. In 1967, it was renamed Staatliche Hochschule für Musik und darstellende Kunst to reflect the inclusion of theater and performing arts programs. Additional facilities were constructed in the 1970s and 1980s, including buildings for music education and performance.

In 1991, the institution adopted its current name, Hochschule für Musik und Theater Hamburg. Further developments included the opening of a new library in 2003 and the establishment of the Theaterakademie campus in the Hamburg-Barmbek district in 2021.

== Study ==
The Hochschule für Musik und Theater Hamburg (HfMT) offers academic programs in music, theatre, music education, music therapy, musicology, and cultural management. These programs are available at undergraduate, graduate, and postgraduate levels and are organized across several departments.

=== Music ===
Degree programs in the field of music include instrumental and vocal performance, conducting, composition, music theory, church music, jazz, and multimedia composition. HfMT also participates in international collaborations, such as the Contemporary Performance and Composition (CoPeCo) master's program, conducted jointly with institutions in other European countries.

=== Theatre ===
The university’s Theatre Academy offers programs in acting, opera, stage direction, music theatre direction, and dramaturgy. The curriculum includes theoretical coursework and practical components in rehearsal and performance settings.

=== Education, Therapy, and Musicology ===
HfMT offers programs in music education (for various school levels), music therapy, and musicology. These programs are intended for students pursuing academic, pedagogical, or therapeutic professions.

=== Cultural and Media Management ===
The Institute for Culture and Media Management (KMM) at HfMT provides degree programs in cultural and media management. These are offered in both in-person and distance-learning formats.

=== Facilities ===
The university’s facilities include teaching spaces, rehearsal rooms, studios, and performance venues. Among these is the Forum, a concert hall with a seating capacity of approximately 450, used for public performances and internal events.

== Former students ==
- Erdoğan Atalay
- Ingrid Bachér
- Lisa Batiashvili
- Hermann Baumann
- Dagmar Berghoff
- Oliver Bendt
- Christian Bruhn
- Margit Carstensen
- Unsuk Chin
- Xiaoyong Chen
- Marko Ciciliani
- Angela Denoke
- Justus von Dohnányi
- Christoph Eschenbach
- Justus Frantz
- Evelyn Hamann
- Hannelore Hoger
- Olga Jegunova
- Peter Jordan
- Toshiyuki Kamioka
- Wiebke Lehmkuhl
- Susanne Lothar
- Marie-Luise Marjan
- Günther Morbach
- Talia Or
- Corinna von Rad
- Ivan Rebroff
- Dorothea Röschmann
- Catherine Rückwardt
- Kolja Schallenberg
- Tanja Tetzlaff
- Iris Vermillion
- Derya Yıldırım

== See also ==
- Education in Hamburg
- Music schools in Germany
