= Das Rheingold discography =

This is a partial discography of Das Rheingold, the first of the four operas that comprise Der Ring des Nibelungen (The Ring of the Nibelung), by Richard Wagner.

The length of the Ring cycle meant that in the pre-LP days (before 1948) recordings from the Ring operas were largely confined to excerpts. In 1929 Franz von Hoesslin and the Walther Staram Concert Orchestra issued recorded excerpts from Das Rheingold on five 78 rpm discs. The first recording of the complete Rheingold was taken from a New York Metropolitan Opera production in 1937, with Artur Bodanzky conducting. Most of the recordings that followed it were also taken from live performances, often from the Bayreuth Festival. The first studio recording was that of Georg Solti with the Vienna Philharmonic in 1958 – part of Solti's Ring cycle recording which was not completed until 1966.

== Recordings ==
The table below is arranged by date of recording; issue dates were often many years after the recording itself. Some of the items have been subject to multiple reissues; generally, recording label details relate to currently available CD versions.

Year	Cast Alberich Wotan Fricka Loge Freia Fasolt Fafner Donner Froh Erda Mime	Conductor, Opera house and orchestra	Label
1937	Eduard Habich; Friedrich Schorr; Karin Branzell; René Maison; Dorothee Manski; Norman Cordon; Emanuel List; Julius Huehn; Hans Clemens; Doris Doe; Karl Laufkötter	Artur Bodanzky; Metropolitan Opera orchestra and chorus	CD: Naxos Historical; Cat: 8.110047-48; Mono
1947	Fred Destal; Herbert Janssen; Elsa Cavelti; Set Svanholm; Nilda Hofmann; Jorge Dantón; Emanuel List; Angelo Mattiello; Umberto di Toto; Lydia Kinderman; Roberto Maggiolo	Erich Kleiber; Teatro Colón orchestra and chorus	CD: Gebhardt; Cat: JGCD 0036
1948	Jean Stern; Carl Kronenberg; Carin Carlsson; Joachim Sattler; Meta Maria Kopp; Otto von Rohr; Wolfgang Etterer; Günther Ambrosius; Kurt Wolinsky; Maria-Luise Schirp; Willy Hofmann	Winfried Zillig; Orchester des Hessischen Rundfunks	CD: Cantus Classics; Cat: 500074
1948	Adolf Vogel; Ferdinand Frantz; Elisabeth Höngen; Julius Pölzer; Ilona Steingruber; Marjan Rus; Herbert Alsen; Alfred Poell; Willy Friedrich; Rosette Anday; William Wernigk	Rudolf Moralt; Vienna Symphony	CD: Myto; Cat: MCD00188; Mono
1950	Alois Pernerstorfer; Ferdinand Frantz; Elisabeth Höngen; Joachim Sattler; Walburga Wegner; Ludwig Weber; Albert Emmerich; Angelo Mattiello; Günther Treptow; Margret Weth-Falke; Emil Markwort	Wilhelm Furtwängler; Teatro alla Scala orchestra and chorus	CD: Opera d'Oro / Archipel Records; Cat: OPD1501 / ARPCD0413 (complete Ring) Mono, Live
1950	Rolf Heide; Ferdinand Frantz; Aga Joetsen; Joachim Sattler; Hertha Wilfert; Otto von Rohr; Helmut Fehn; Sanders Schier; Heinrich Bensing; Marie-Luise Schilp; Willy Hofmann	Kurt Schröder; Orchester des Hessischen Rundfunks	CD: Preiser Records; Cat: 90450
1952	Gustav Neidlinger; Hermann Uhde; Ira Malaniuk; Erich Witte; Inge Borkh; Ludwig Weber; Josef Greindl; Werner Faulhaber; Wolfgang Windgassen; Melanija Bugarinović; Paul Kuën	Joseph Keilberth; Bayreuth Festival Orchestra and chorus Recording at Bayreuth Festival	CD: EMI; Cat: CZS 7 67124 2 Mono, Live
1952	Gustav Neidlinger; Ferdinand Frantz; Res Fischer; Wolfgang Windgassen; Lore Hoffmann; Gottlob Frick; Josef Greindl; Josef Metternich; Rudolf Schock; Res Fischer; Paul Kuën	Wilhelm Schüchter; NDR Elbphilharmonie Orchestra	CD: Gebhardt; Cat: JGCD 0054-2
1953	Gustav Neidlinger; Ferdinand Frantz; Ira Malaniuk; Wolfgang Windgassen; Elisabeth Grümmer; Josef Greindl; Gottlob Frick; Alfred Poell; Lorenz Fehenberger; Ruth Siewert; Julius Patzak	Wilhelm Furtwängler; Orchestra Sonfonica e Coro della RAI	CD: Angel, Cat: CDZM 67213 (complete Ring) Mono
1953	Gustav Neidlinger; Hans Hotter; Ira Malaniuk; Erich Witte; Bruni Falcon; Ludwig Weber; Josef Greindl; Hermann Uhde; Gerhard Stolze; Erika Zimmermann; Paul Kuën	Clemens Krauss; Bayreuth Festival Orchestra and chorus Recording at Bayreuth Festival	CD: Gala, Cat: 100.519; Mono, Live
1955	Gustav Neidlinger; Hans Hotter; Georgine von Milinkovič; Rudolf Lustig; Hertha Wilfert; Ludwig Weber; Josef Greindl; Toni Blankenheim; Josef Traxel; Maria von Ilosvay; Paul Kuën	Joseph Keilberth; Bayreuth Festival Orchestra and chorus Recording at Bayreuth Festival	CD: Testament; Cat: SBT21390; Stereo, Live
1957	Gustav Neidlinger; Hans Hotter; Georgine von Milinkovič; Ludwig Suthaus; Elisabeth Grümmer; Arnold van Mill; Josef Greindl; Toni Blankenheim; Josef Traxel; Maria von Ilosvay; Paul Kuën	Hans Knappertsbusch; Bayreuth Festival Orchestra and chorus Recording at Bayreuth Festival	CD: Walhall; Cat: WLCD 0216; Mono, Live
1957	Otakar Kraus; Hans Hotter; Georgine von Milinkovič; Erich Witte; Elisabeth Lindermeier; Kurt Böhme; Friedrich Dalberg; Robert Allman; Maria von Ilosvay; Peter Klein	Rudolf Kempe; Royal Opera House orchestra and chorus	CD: Testament; Cat: SBT131426 (complete Ring) Mono, Live
1957	Lawrence Davidson; Hermann Uhde; Blanche Thebom; Ramón Vinay; Mariquita Moll; Kurt Böhme; Dezső Ernster; Arthur Budney; James McCracken; Jean Madeira; Norman Kelley	Fritz Stiedry; Orchestra of the Metropolitan Opera	CD: Walhall; Cat: WLCD 232
1958	Gustav Neidlinger; George London; Kirsten Flagstad; Set Svanholm; Claire Watson; Walter Kreppel; Kurt Böhme; Eberhard Wächter; Waldemar Kmentt; Jean Madeira; Paul Kuën	Georg Solti; Vienna Philharmonic	CD: Decca; Cat: 4780382; Stereo
1958	Frans Andersson; Hans Hotter; Rita Gorr; Fritz Uhl; Elisabeth Grümmer; Theo Adam; Josef Greindl; Eric Saedén; Sándor Kónya; Maria von Ilosvay; Gerhard Stolze	Hans Knappertsbusch; Bayreuth Festival Orchestra and chorus Recording at Bayreuth Festival	CD: Walhall; Cat: WLCD 0246; Mono, Live
1959	Otakar Kraus; Hans Hotter; Ursula Boese; Richard Holm; Una Hale; Kurt Böhme; Michael Langdon; David Kelley; Edgar Evans; Marga Höffgen; Peter Klein	Franz Konwitschny; Royal Opera House orchestra and chorus	CD: Walhall; Cat: WLCD0334; Live 18 Sept 1959
1962	Zoltán Kelemen; George London; Elisabeth Schärtel; Herbert Schachtschneider; Ingeborg Kjellgren; Gerd Nienstedt; Heiner Horn; Karl Sablotzke; Hermann Winkler; Helen Raab; Erwin Wohlfahrt	Wolfgang Sawallisch; Gürzenich Orchestra Cologne	CD: Living Stage; Cat: LS 1004; Mono, Live
1963	Otakar Kraus; Otto Wiener; Grace Hoffman; Gerhard Stolze; Jutta Mayfarth; Walter Kreppel; Peter Roth-Ehrang; Marcel Cordes; Horst Wilhelm; Marga Höffgen; Eric Klaus	Rudolf Kempe; Bayreuth Festival Orchestra and chorus Recording at Bayreuth Festival	Published by houseofopera.com Mono, Live
1966	Gustav Neidlinger; Theo Adam; Annelies Burmeister; Wolfgang Windgassen; Anja Silja; Martti Talvela; Kurt Böhme; Gerd Nienstedt; Hermin Esser; Věra Soukupová; Erwin Wohlfahrt	Karl Böhm; Bayreuth Festival Orchestra and chorus Recording at Bayreuth Festival	CD: Philips; Cat: 412 475-2; Stereo, Live
1967	Zoltán Kelemen; Dietrich Fischer-Dieskau; Josephine Veasey; Gerhard Stolze; Simone Mangelsdorff; Martti Talvela; Karl Ridderbusch; Robert Kerns; Donald Grobe; Oralia Domínguez; Erwin Wohlfahrt	Herbert von Karajan; Berlin Philharmonic	CD: Deutsche Grammophon; Cat: 457 781-2; Stereo
1968	Theo Adam; Zoltán Kelemen; Janis Martin; Herbert Schachtschneider; Leonore Kirschstein; Gerd Nienstedt; Karl Ridderbusch; Thomas Tipton; Hermann Winkler; Oralia Domínguez; Erwin Wohlfahrt	Wolfgang Sawallisch; RAI Roma	CD: Myto; Cat: MCD 054 316
1974	Franz Mazura; Donald McIntyre; Anna Reynolds; Hermin Esser; Hannelore Bode; Karl Ridderbusch; Kurt Moll; Gerd Nienstedt; Heribert Steinbach; Marga Höffgen; Heinz Zednik	Horst Stein; Bayreuth Festival Orchestra and chorus Recording at Bayreuth Festival	CD: Opera Depot; Cat: OD 10185-2
1974	Derek Hammond-Stroud; Norman Bailey; Katherine Pring; Emile Belcourt; Lois McDonall; Robert Lloyd; Clifford Grant; Norman Welsby; Robert Ferguson; Anne Collins; Gregory Dempsey	Reginald Goodall; English National Opera; Recorded in English	CD: Chandos; Cat: CHAN 3054
1980	Hermann Becht; Donald McIntyre; Hanna Schwarz; Heinz Zednik; Carmen Reppel; Matti Salminen; Fritz Hübner; Martin Egel; Siegfried Jerusalem; Ortrun Wenkel; Helmut Pampuch	Pierre Boulez; Bayreuth Festival Orchestra and chorus Recording at Bayreuth Festival	CD: Philips; Cat: 434 422-2; Stereo
1983	Siegmund Nimsgern; Theo Adam; Yvonne Minton; Peter Schreier; Marita Napier; Roland Bracht; Matti Salminen; Karl-Heinz Stryczek; Eberhard Büchner; Ortrun Wenkel; Christian Vogel	Marek Janowski; Staatskapelle Dresden orchestra and chorus	CD: RCA; Cat: B00011MJV6 (RCA reissue) (complete Ring) Stereo
1988	Ekkehard Wlaschiha; James Morris; Christa Ludwig; Siegfried Jerusalem; MarieAnne Häggander; Kurt Moll; Jan-Hendrik Rootering; Siegfried Lorenz; Mark Baker; Birgitta Svendén; Heinz Zednik	James Levine; Metropolitan Opera orchestra and chorus	CD: Deutsche Grammophon; Cat: 445 295-2; Stereo
1989	Theo Adam; James Morris; Marjana Lipovšek; Heinz Zednik; Eva Johansson; Hans Tschammer; Kurt Rydl; Andreas Schmidt; Peter Seiffert; Jadwiga Rappé; Peter Haage	Bernard Haitink; Bavarian Radio Symphony Orchestra; Bayerischen Rundfunks chorus	CD: EMI; Cat: CDS 7 49853 2 Stereo
1991	Ekkehard Wlaschiha; Robert Hale; Marjana Lipovšek; Robert Tear; Nancy Gustafson; Jan-Hendrik Rootering; Kurt Moll; Florian Cerny; Josef Hopferwieser; Hanna Schwarz; Helmut Pampuch	Wolfgang Sawallisch; Bavarian State Opera orchestra and chorus Recording at National Theater, Munich, November	CD: EMI; Cat: 724357273121 (complete Ring) Stereo, Live
1991	Günter von Kannen; John Tomlinson; Linda Finnie; Graham Clark; Eva Johansson; Matthias Hölle; Philip Kang; Bodo Brinkmann; Kurt Schreibmayer; Birgitta Svendén; Helmut Pampuch	Daniel Barenboim; Bayreuth Festival Orchestra and chorus	CD: Teldec; Cat: 4509 91185 2 Stereo, Live
1993	Franz-Josef Kapellmann; Robert Hale; Hanna Schwarz; Kim Begley; Nancy Gustafson; Jan-Hendrik Rootering; Walter Fink; Eike Wilm Schulte; Thomas Sunnegårdh; Elena Zaremba; Peter Schreier	Christoph von Dohnányi; Cleveland Orchestra	CD: Decca; Cat: 443 690-2; Stereo
2002	Esa Ruuttunen; Wolfgang Probst; Michaela Schuster; Robert Künzli; Helga Rós Indridadóttir; Roland Bracht; Phillip Ens; Motti Kastón; Bernhard Schneider; Mette Ejsing; Eberhard Francesco Lorenz	Lothar Zagrosek; Staatsoper Stuttgart orchestra and chorus Recordings at Württembergische Staatsoper	CD: Naxos Records; Cat: 8.660170-71; Stereo, Live
2003 /2004	Günter von Kannen; Falk Struckmann; Lioba Braun; Graham Clark; Elisabete Matos; Kwangchul Youn; Matthias Hölle; Wolfgang Rauch; Jeff Dowd; Andrea Bönig; Francisco Vas	Bertrand de Billy; Orquestra Simfònica del Gran Teatre del Liceu; Recordings at the Liceu, Barcelona	DVD: Opus Arte; ASIN: B000IFRPY6; Surround Sound, Live
2004	John Wegner; John Bröcheler; Elizabeth Campbell; Christopher Doig; Kate Ladner; Andrew Collis; David Hibbard; Timothy DuFore; Andrew Brunsdon; Liane Keegan; Richard Greager	Asher Fisch; Adelaide Symphony Orchestra	CD: Melba Recordings; Cat: 301089-90
2007	Franz-Josef Kapellmann; Juha Uusitalo; Anna Larsson; John Daszak; Sabina von Walter; Matti Salminen; Stephen Milling; Ilya Bannik; Germán Villar; Christa Mayer; Gerhard Siegel	Zubin Mehta; Orquestra de la Comunitat Valenciano	DVD and Blu-ray: C Major; Cat: 700508; Surround Sound, Live
2008	Wolfgang Koch; Falk Struckmann; Katja Pieweck; Peter Galliard; Hellen Kwon; Tigran Martirossian; Alexander Tsymbalyuk; Jan Buchwald; Ladislav Elgr; Deborah Humble; Jürger Sacher	Simone Young; Philharmoniker Hamburg	CD: Oehms Classics; CAT: OC 929; Stereo, Live
2009	Andrew Shore; Albert Dohmen; Michelle Breedt; Arnold Bezuyen; Edith Haller; Kwangchul Youn; Hans-Peter König; Ralf Lukas; Clemens Bieber; Christa Mayer; Gerhard Siegel	Christian Thielemann; Bayreuth Festival Orchestra and chorus Recording at Bayreuth Festival	CD: Opus Arte; Cat: OACD9000BD; Stereo (SACD), Live
2010	Jochen Schmeckenbecher; Terje Stensvold; Martina Dike; Kurt Streit; Barbara Zechmeister; Alfred Reiter; Magnus Baldvinsson; Dietrich Volle; Richard Cox; Meredith Arwady; Hans-Jürgen Lazar	Sebastian Weigle; Frankfurt Opera orchestra	CD: Oehms; Cat: OC 935; Stereo Live
2011	Tomasz Konieczny; Albert Dohmen; Janina Baechle; Adrian Eröd; Alexandra Reinprecht; Lars Woldt; Ain Anger; Markus Eiche; Herbert Lippert; Anna Larsson; Wolfgang Schmidt	Christian Thielemann; Vienna State Opera orchestra and chorus	CD: Deutsche Grammophon; Stereo, Live
2012	Nikolai Putilin; René Pape; Ekaterina Gubanova; Stephan Rügamer; Viktoria Yastrebova; Jewgeni Nikotin; Mikail Petrenko; Alexei Markov; Sergei Semishkur; Zlata Bulycheva; Andrei Popov	Valery Gergiev; Mariinsky Theatre Orchestra	CD: Mariinsky; Cat: MAR 0526; Stereo
2013	Jochen Schmeckenbecher; Tomasz Konieczny; Iris Vermillion; Christian Elsner; Ricarda Merbeth; Günther Groissböck; Timo Riihonen; Antonio Yang; Kor-Jan Dusseljee; Maria Radner; Andreas Conrad	Marek Janowski; Berlin Radio Symphony Orchestra; Berlin Radio Choir; Live recording at Berlin Philharmonie, 22 November 2012	SACD: Pentatone; Cat: PTC 5186406; Stereo (SACD), Live
2013	Richard Paul Fink; Greer Grimsley; Stephanie Blythe; Mark Schowalter; Wendy Bryn Harmer; Andrea Silvestrelli; Daniel Sumegi; Markus Brück; Ric Furman; Lucille Beer; Dennis Peterson	Asher Fisch; Seattle Symphony orchestra and chorus	CD: Avie Records; Cat: AVR 2313; Stereo, Live
2015	Peter Sidhom; Matthias Goerne; Michelle DeYoung; Kim Begley; Anna Samuil; Kwangchul Youn; Stephen Milling; Oleksandr Pushniak; Charles Reid; Deborah Humble; David Cangelosi	Jaap van Zweden; Hong Kong Philharmonic Orchestra	CD: Naxos; Cat: 866037475; Stereo, Live
2015	Tomasz Konieczny; Michael Volle; Elisabeth Kulman; Burkhard Ulrich; Annette Dasch; Peter Rose; Eric Halfvarson; Christian van Horn; Benjamin Bruns; Janina Baechle; Herwig Pecoraro	Simon Rattle; Bavarian Radio Symphony Orchestra	CD: BR Klassics; Cat: 900133; Stereo, Live
2016	Samuel Youn; Iain Paterson; Susan Bickley; Will Hartmann; Emma Bell; Reinhard Hagen; Clive Bayley; David Stout; David Butt Philip; Susanne Resmark; Nicky Spence	Mark Elder; The Hallé	CD: Hallé; Cat: CDHLD 7549; Stereo, Live
2020	Jochen Schmeckenbecher; James Rutherford; Katarzyna Kuncio; Raymond Very; Sylvia Hamvasi; Thorsten Grümbel; Łukasz Konieczny; David Jerusalem; Bernhard Berchtold; Ramona Zaharia; Florian Simson	Axel Kober; Duisburg Philharmonic	CD: cAvi
