= Siegfried discography =

This is a discography of Siegfried, the third of the four operas that comprise Der Ring des Nibelungen (The Ring of the Nibelung), by Richard Wagner, which received its premiere at the Bayreuth Festspielhaus on 16 August 1876.

== Recordings ==
Year	Cast Siegfried Brünnhilde Mime Wanderer Alberich Erda Fafner Waldvogel	Conductor, Opera house and orchestra	Label
1937	Lauritz Melchior; Kirsten Flagstad; Karl Laufkötter; Friedrich Schorr; Eduard Habich; Kerstin Thorborg; Emanuel List; Stella Andreva	Artur Bodanzky; Metropolitan Opera orchestra & chorus	CD: Naxos; Cat: 8.110211-13; Mono, Live
1949	Gunther Treptow; Gertrude Grob-Prandl; William Wernigk; Ferdinand Frantz; Adolf Vogel; Rosette Anday; Herbert Alsen; Ruthilde Boesch	Rudolf Moralt; Vienna Symphony	CD: Myto; Cat: 3MCD 972-155; Mono, studio
1950	Set Svanholm; Kirsten Flagstad; Peter Markwort; Josef Herrmann; Alois Pernerstorfer; Elisabeth Höngen; Ludwig Weber; Julia Moor	Wilhelm Furtwängler; Teatro alla Scala orchestra & chorus	CD: Opera d'Oro; Cat: OPD1501 (complete Ring) Mono, Live
1951	Set Svanholm; Helen Traubel; Peter Klein; Ferdinand Frantz; Gerhard Pechner; Karin Branzell; Dezső Ernster; Erna Berger	Fritz Stiedry; Metropolitan Opera	CD: Gebhardt
1952	Bernd Aldenhoff; Astrid Varnay; Paul Kuen; Hans Hotter; Gustav Neidlinger; Melanija Bugarinović; Kurt Böhme; Rita Streich	Joseph Keilberth; Bayreuth Festival Orchestra	CD: Myto
1953	Wolfgang Windgassen; Astrid Varnay; Paul Kuen; Hans Hotter; Gustav Neidlinger; Maria von Ilosvay; Josef Greindl; Rita Streich	Clemens Krauss; Bayreuth Festival Orchestra & chorus	CD: Gala; Cat: GL100.653; Mono, Live
1953	Ludwig Suthaus; Martha Mödl; Julius Patzak; Ferdinand Frantz; Alois Pernerstorfer; Margarete Klose; Josef Greindl; Rita Streich	Wilhelm Furtwängler; Orchestra Sinfonica della RAI	CD: EMI; Cat: CZS 7 67131 2 Mono, Live
1955	Wolfgang Windgassen; Astrid Varnay; Paul Kuen; Hans Hotter; Gustav Neidlinger; Maria von Ilosvay; Josef Greindl; Ilse Hollweg	Joseph Keilberth; Bayreuth Festival Orchestra & chorus	CD: Testament; Cat: SBT41392; Stereo, Live
1956	Wolfgang Windgassen; Astrid Varnay; Paul Kuen; Hans Hotter; Gustav Neidlinger; Jean Madeira; Arnold van Mill; Ilse Hollweg	Hans Knappertsbusch; Bayreuth Festival Orchestra & chorus	CD: Orfeo complete Ring
1957	Wolfgang Windgassen; Birgit Nilsson; Peter Klein; Hans Hotter; Otakar Kraus; Maria von Ilosvay; Frederick Dalberg; Jeannette Sinclair	Rudolf Kempe; Royal Opera House orchestra & chorus	CD: Testament; Cat: SBT131426 (complete Ring) Mono, Live
1962	Wolfgang Windgassen; Birgit Nilsson; Gerhard Stolze; Hans Hotter; Gustav Neidlinger; Marga Höffgen; Kurt Böhme; Joan Sutherland	Georg Solti; Vienna Philharmonic	CD: Decca; Cat: 455 564-2; Stereo, Studio
1962	Hans Hopf; Birgit Nilsson; Erich Klaus; Otto Wiener; Otakar Kraus; Marga Höffgen; Peter Roth-Ehrang; Ingeborg Moussa-Felderer	Rudolf Kempe; Bayreuth Festival Orchestra	CD: Myto; Cat: P/2013; Mono, Live
1966	Wolfgang Windgassen; Birgit Nilsson; Erwin Wohlfahrt; Theo Adam; Gustav Neidlinger; Věra Soukupová; Kurt Böhme; Erika Köth	Karl Böhm; Bayreuth Festival Orchestra & chorus	CD: Philips; Cat: 412 483-2; Stereo, Live
1968	Jean Cox; Naděžda Kniplová; Erwin Wohlfahrt; Theo Adam; Zoltán Keleman; Oralia Domínguez; Karl Ridderbusch; Ingrid Paller	Wolfgang Sawallisch; Orchestra di Roma della RAI	CD: Myto; 3MCD 055.318; Live
1969	Jess Thomas; Helga Dernesch; Gerhard Stolze; Thomas Stewart; Zoltán Keleman; Oralia Domínguez; Karl Ridderbusch; Catherine Gayer	Herbert von Karajan; Berlin Philharmonic	CD: Deutsche Grammophon; Cat: 457 790-2; Stereo, Studio 1970 Grammy Award for Best Opera Recording
1973	Alberto Remedios; Rita Hunter; Gregory Dempsey; Norman Bailey; Derek Hammond-Stroud; Anne Collins; Clifford Grant; Maurine London	Reginald Goodall; English National Opera	CD: Chandos; Recorded in English
1980	Manfred Jung; Gwyneth Jones; Heinz Zednik; Donald McIntyre; Hermann Becht; Ortrun Wenkel; Fritz Hübner; Norma Sharp	Pierre Boulez; Bayreuth Festival Orchestra & chorus	CD: Philips; Cat: 434 423-2; Stereo, Studio
1982	René Kollo; Jeannine Altmeyer; Peter Schreier; Theo Adam; Siegmund Nimsgern; Ortrun Wenkel; Matti Salminen; Norma Sharp	Marek Janowski; Staatskapelle Dresden orchestra & chorus	CD: Eurodisc, RCA; Cat: 6100-7023, B00011MJV6 (complete Ring) Stereo, Studio
1989	René Kollo; Hildegard Behrens; Helmut Pampuch; Robert Hale; Ekkehard Wlaschiha; Hanna Schwarz; Kurt Moll; Julie Kaufmann	Wolfgang Sawallisch; Bavarian State Opera orchestra & chorus	CD: EMI; Cat: 724357273121 (complete Ring) Stereo, Live
1990	Reiner Goldberg; Hildegard Behrens; Heinz Zednik; James Morris; Ekkehard Wlaschiha; Birgitta Svendén; Kurt Moll; Kathleen Battle	James Levine; Metropolitan Opera orchestra & chorus	CD: Deutsche Grammophon; Cat: 429 407-2; Stereo, Studio
1990	Siegfried Jerusalem; Éva Marton; Peter Haage; James Morris; Theo Adam; Jadwiga Rappé; Kurt Rydl; Kiri Te Kanawa	Bernard Haitink; Bavarian Radio Symphony Orchestra	CD: EMI; Cat: CDS 7 54290 2 Stereo, Studio
1992	Siegfried Jerusalem; Anne Evans; Graham Clark; John Tomlinson; Günter von Kannen; Birgitta Svendén; Philip Kang; Hilde Leidland	Daniel Barenboim; Bayreuth Festival Orchestra & chorus	CD: Teldec; Cat: 4509 94193 2 Stereo, Live
1995	Edward Cook; Carla Pohl; Hans-Jörg Weinschenk; John Wegner; Oleg Bryjak; Ortrun Wenkel; Simon Yang; Tiny Peters	Günter Neuhold; Badische Staatskapelle	CD: Brilliant Classics
1999	Alan Woodrow; Elisabeth-Maria Wachutka; Thomas Harper; Juha Uusitalo; Andrea Martin; Julia Oesch; Xiaoliang Li; Hiroko Kouda	Gustav Kuhn; Tiroler Festspiele Orchestra	CD: Arte Nova
2002– 2003	Jon Fredric West; Lisa Gasteen; Heinz Göhrig; Wolfgang Schöne; Bjorn Waag; Helene Ranada; Attila Jun; Gabriela Herrera	Lothar Zagrosek; Staatsoper Stuttgart orchestra & chorus	CD: Naxos Records; Cat: 8.660175-78; Stereo (SACD), Live
2003– 2004	John Treleaven; Deborah Polaski; Graham Clark; Falk Struckmann; Günter von Kannen; Andrea Bönig; Eric Halfvarson; Cristina Obregón	Bertrand de Billy; Orquestra Simfònica del Gran Teatre del Liceu	DVD: Opus Arte; ASIN: B000IFRPY6; Surround Sound, Live
2004	Gary Rideout; Linda Gasteen; Richard Greager; John Bröcheler; John Wegner; Liane Keegan; David Hibbard; Shu-Cheen Yu	Asher Fisch; Adelaide Symphony Orchestra	CD: Melba Recordings
2006	Stig Fogh Andersen; Iréne Theorin; Bengt-Ola Morgny; James Johnson; Sten Byriel; Susanne Resmark; Christian Christiansen; Gisella Stille	Michael Schønwandt; Royal Danish Orchestra	DVD: Decca
2009	Stephen Gould; Linda Watson; Gerhard Siegel; Albert Dohmen; Andrew Shore; Christa Mayer; Hans-Peter König; Robin Johannsen	Christian Thielemann; Bayreuth Festival Orchestra & chorus	CD: Opus Arte; Cat: OACD9000BD (complete Ring) Stereo, Live
2013	Stephen Gould; Violeta Urmana; Christian Elsner; Tomasz Konieczny; Jochen Schmeckenbecher; Anna Larsson; Matti Salminen; Sophie Klußmann	Marek Janowski; Berlin Radio Symphony Orchestra; Berlin Radio Choir	SACD: PENTATONE; Cat: PTC 5186408; Stereo (SACD), Live
2017	Simon O'Neill; Heidi Melton; David Cangelosi; Matthias Goerne; Werner Van Mechelen; Deborah Humble; Falk Struckmann; Valentina Farcas	Jaap van Zweden; Hong Kong Philharmonic	CD: Naxos
2019	Simon O'Neill; Rachel Nicholls; Gerhard Siegel; Iain Paterson; Martin Winkler; Anna Larson; Clive Bayley; Malin Christensson	Mark Elder; The Hallé	CD: Hallé
2021	Corby Welch; Linda Watson; Cornel Frey; James Rutherford; Jochen Schmeckenbecher; Renée Morloc; Łukasz Konieczny; Aisha Tuemmler	Axel Kober; Duisburg Philharmonic	CD: cAvi
2023	Simon O'Neill; Anja Kampe; Peter Hoare; Michael Volle; Georg Nigl; Gerhild Romberger; Franz-Josef Selig; Danae Kontora	Simon Rattle; Bavarian Radio Symphony Orchestra	CD: BR Klassik
