= Parsifal discography =

This is a partial discography of Parsifal, an 1882 opera in three acts by Richard Wagner.

== History ==
Parsifal was expressly composed for the stage at Bayreuth and many of the most famous recordings of the opera come from live performances on that stage. In the pre-LP era, Karl Muck conducted excerpts from the opera at Bayreuth which are still considered some of the best performances of the opera on disc (they also contain the only sound evidence of the bells constructed for the work's premiere, which were later melted down by the Nazis during World War II). Hans Knappertsbusch was the conductor most closely associated with Parsifal at Bayreuth in the post-war years, and the performances under his baton in 1951 marked the re-opening of the Bayreuth Festival after the Second World War. These historic performances were recorded in mono sound, originally issued but now no longer available on the Teldec label, and reissued in 2003 on Naxos Historical. Knappertsbusch recorded the opera again for Philips in 1962 in stereo, and this release is often considered to be the classic Parsifal recording. There are also many "unofficial" live recordings from Bayreuth, capturing virtually every Parsifal cast ever conducted by Knappertsbusch.

Amongst the studio recordings, those by Georg Solti, Herbert von Karajan and Daniel Barenboim (the latter two both conducting the Berlin Philharmonic) have been widely praised. The von Karajan recording was voted "Record of the Year" in the 1981 Gramophone Awards. Also highly regarded is a recording of Parsifal under the baton of Rafael Kubelík. Originally recorded for Deutsche Grammophon but never released, it is now available on the Arts Archives label.

On the Saturday 14 December 2013 broadcast of BBC Radio 3 CD Review, music critic David Nice surveyed recordings of Parsifal and recommended the 1980 recording by the Bavarian Radio Symphony Orchestra conducted by Rafael Kubelík as the best available choice (though it has not been widely available for a long time).

== Audio recordings ==
| Year | Cast: Parsifal, Kundry, Gurnemanz, Amfortas, Klingsor | Conductor, Opera house and/or orchestra | Label | Catalogue number |
|---|---|---|---|---|
| 15 April 1938 matinèee | Lauritz Melchior, Kirsten Flagstad, Emanuel List, Friedrich Schorr, Arnold Gabor | Artur Bodanzky (acts 1 and 3); Erich Leinsdorf (act 2) (Note: There is no applause at the end of act 1.); Metropolitan Opera | Marston Records, restoration of live recording | 54008-2 (4 CDs) |
| 1936 | René Maison, Marjorie Lawrence, Alexander Kipnis, Martial Singher, Fritz Krenn | Fritz Busch, Orquesta del Teatro Colón, Buenos Aires | Marston | 53003 |
| 1949 | Günther Treptow, Anny Konetzni, Ludwig Weber, Paul Schöffler, Adolf Vogel | Rudolf Moralt, Wiener Symphoniker | Myto (Mono) | 4MCD 954.136 |
| 1950, Italian | Africo Baldelli, Maria Callas, Boris Christoff, Rolando Panerai, Giuseppe Modesti | Vittorio Gui, Orchestra Sinfonica e Coro di Roma della RAI | Cetra (Mono) | CDAR 2020 |
| 1951 | Wolfgang Windgassen, Martha Mödl, Ludwig Weber, George London, Hermann Uhde | Hans Knappertsbusch, Bayreuth Festival Orchestra and Chorus | Naxos Historical (Mono) | 8.110221-24 |
| 1954 | Wolfgang Windgassen, Martha Mödl, Josef Greindl, Hans Hotter, Gustav Neidlinger | Hans Knappertsbusch, Bayreuth Festival Orchestra and Chorus | Golden Melodram | GM 1.0053 |
| 1958 | Hans Beirer, Régine Crespin, Josef Greindl, Eberhard Waechter, Jerome Hines | Hans Knappertsbusch, Bayreuth Festival Orchestra and Chorus | Golden Melodram | GM 1.0058 |
| 1959 | Eberhard Waechter, Martha Mödl, Josef Greindl, Hans Beirer, Jerome Hines | Hans Knappertsbusch, Bayreuth Festival Orchestra and Chorus | Golden Melodram | GM 1.0070 |
| 1961 | Fritz Uhl, Elisabeth Höngen/Christa Ludwig, Hans Hotter, Eberhard Waechter, Walter Berry | Herbert von Karajan, Vienna State Opera Orchestra and Chorus | RCA | 61950 |
| 1962 | Jess Thomas, Irene Dalis, Hans Hotter, George London, Gustav Neidlinger | Hans Knappertsbusch, Bayreuth Festival Orchestra and Chorus | Philips Classics | 475 7785 |
| 1963 | George London, Ludwig Weber, Hans Hotter, Wolfgang Windgassen, Gustav Neidlinger, Irene Dalis | Hans Knappertsbusch, Bayreuth Festival Orchestra and Chorus | Golden Melodram | GM L0034 |
| 1964 | Jon Vickers, Barbro Ericson, Hans Hotter, Thomas Stewart, Gustav Neidlinger | Hans Knappertsbusch, Bayreuth Festival Orchestra and Chorus | Arcadia | KLMP 451.4 |
| 1970 | James King, Gwyneth Jones, Franz Crass, Thomas Stewart, Donald McIntyre | Pierre Boulez, Bayreuth Festival Orchestra and Chorus | Deutsche Grammophon | 435718 |
| 1971 | Jon Vickers, Amy Shuard, Louis Hendrikx, Norman Bailey, Donald McIntyre | Reginald Goodall, Orchestra of the Royal Opera House | Opus Arte | OADA8004DI |
| 1972 | René Kollo, Christa Ludwig, Gottlob Frick, Dietrich Fischer-Dieskau, Zoltan Kelemen | Georg Solti, Vienna Philharmonic, Vienna State Opera Chorus, Vienna Boys' Choir | Decca | 470805 |
| 1975 | René Kollo, Gisela Schröter, Ulrik Cold, Theo Adam, Reid Bunger | Herbert Kegel; Leipzig Radio Symphony Orchestra and Chorus | Berlin/VEB Deutsche Schallplatten DDR | 0013482BC |
| 1979–1980 | Peter Hofmann, Dunja Vejzović, Kurt Moll, José van Dam, Siegmund Nimsgern | Herbert von Karajan, Berlin Philharmonic, Deutsche Oper Berlin Chorus | Deutsche Grammophon | 413347 |
| 1980 | James King, Yvonne Minton, Kurt Moll, Bernd Weikl, Franz Mazura | Rafael Kubelík; Bavarian Radio Symphony Orchestra | Arts Archives | 430272 |
| 1981 | Reiner Goldberg, Yvonne Minton, Robert Lloyd, Wolfgang Schoene, Aage Haugland | Armin Jordan; Monte Carlo Radio Orchestra | Erato | 2292-45662-2 |
| 1985 | Warren Ellsworth, Waltraud Meier, Phillip Joll, Donald McIntyre, Nicholas Folwell | Reginald Goodall; Welsh National Opera Chorus and Orchestra | EMI | 65665 |
| 1987 | Peter Hofmann, Waltraud Meier, Hans Sotin, Simon Estes, Franz Mazura | James Levine; Bayreuth Festival Orchestra and Chorus | Philips | 434 616-2 |
| 1990 | Siegfried Jerusalem, Waltraud Meier, Matthias Hölle, José van Dam, Gunter von Kannen | Daniel Barenboim, Berlin Philharmonic, State Opera Berlin Chorus | Teldec | 74448 |
| 1993 | Plácido Domingo, Jessye Norman, Kurt Moll, James Morris, Ekkehard Wlaschiha | James Levine, Metropolitan Opera Orchestra and Chorus | Deutsche Grammophon | 437501 |
| 2005 | Plácido Domingo, Waltraud Meier, Franz-Josef Selig, Falk Struckmann, Wolfgang Bankl | Christian Thielemann; Vienna State Opera Orchestra and Chorus | Deutsche Grammophon | 4776006 |
| 2005 | Richard Decker, Doris Soffel, Wolfgang Schöne, Matthias Hölle, Mikolaj Zalasinski | Gabor Ötvös; Teatro La Fenice Orchestra and Chorus | Dynamic (record label) | 33497 |
| 2009 | Gary Lehman, Violeta Urmana, René Pape, Evgeny Nikitin, Nikolai Putilin | Valery Gergiev; Orchestra and chorus of the Mariinsky Theatre | Issued on hybrid SACD: Mariinsky, 2009 | n/a |
| 2012 | Christian Elsner, Michelle DeYoung, Franz-Josef Selig, Evgeny Nikitin, Eike Wilm Schulte | Marek Janowski; Berlin Radio Choir and Berlin Radio Symphony Orchestra | Pentatone Marek Janowski Wagner Opera Cycle | PTC5186401 |

== Video recordings ==
This is a partial filmography of Parsifal (1882), an opera in three acts by Richard Wagner. In addition to the productions of the complete opera listed below, there is a 1998 documentary directed by Tony Palmer, titled: Parsifal – The Search for the Grail. It was recorded in various European theaters, including: the Mariinsky Theatre, the Ravello Festival, Siena, and the Bayreuth Festival. It contains extracts from Mr. Palmer's stage production of Parsifal starring Plácido Domingo, Violeta Urmana, Matti Salminen, Nikolai Putilin and Anna Netrebko. It includes interviews with Domingo, Wolfgang Wagner, Robert Gutman and Karen Armstrong. The film exists in two versions: (1) a complete version running 116 minutes and officially approved by Domingo, and (2) an 88-minute version, cut as a result of being censored in Germany as being too "political", "uncomfortable" and "irrelevant".

| | Cast: Parsifal, Kundry, Gurnemanz, Amfortas, Klingsor, Titurel | Conductor, Opera house, orchestra | Stage director | Label / catalogue number |
| 1981 | Siegfried Jerusalem, Eva Randová, Hans Sotin, Bernd Weikl, Leif Roar, Matti Salminen | Horst Stein, Bayreuth Festival Orchestra | Wolfgang Wagner | Deutsche Grammophon, Unitel / 0734328 |
| 1982 | Reiner Goldberg, Yvonne Minton, Robert Lloyd, Wolfgang Schöne, Aage Haugland, Hans Tschammer | Armin Jordan, Monte-Carlo Philharmonic Orchestra | Hans-Jürgen Syberberg | Image Entertainment. This film was released theatrically with the following actors appearing on the screen in place of the singers – Parsifal 1: Michael Kutter, Parsifal 2: Karen Krick, Kundry: Edith Clever, Amfortas: Armin Jordan, Titurel: Martin Sperr. |
| 1992 | Poul Elming, Waltraud Meier, John Tomlinson, Falk Struckmann, Günter von Kannen, Fritz Hübner | Daniel Barenboim, Berlin State Opera, Staatskapelle Berlin | Harry Kupfer | EuroArts / 2066738 |
| 1992 | Siegfried Jerusalem, Waltraud Meier, Kurt Moll, Bernd Weikl, Franz Mazura, Jan-Hendrik Rootering | James Levine, Metropolitan Opera Orchestra & Chorus | Otto Schenk | Deutsche Grammophon / 0730329; DVD direction: Brian Large; Met Opera on Demand |
| 1998 | Poul Elming, Linda Watson, Hans Sotin, Falk Struckmann, Ekkehard Wlaschiha, Matthias Hölle | Giuseppe Sinopoli, Bayreuth Festival Orchestra | Wolfgang Wagner | C Major / 705908 |
| 2004 | Christopher Ventris, Waltraud Meier, Matti Salminen, Thomas Hampson, Tom Fox, Bjarni Thor Kristinsson | Kent Nagano, Deutsches Symphonie-Orchester Berlin, Festspielchor Baden-Baden | Nikolaus Lehnhoff | Opus Arte / OA0915D |
| 2006 | Richard Decker, Doris Soffel, Matthias Hölle, Wolfgang Schöne, Mikolaj Zalasinski, Ulrich Dünnebach | Gabor Ötvös, Orchestra and Chorus of Teatro La Fenice di Venezia | Denis Krief | Dynamic / 33497 |
| 2007 | Christopher Ventris, Yvonne Naef, Matti Salminen, Michael Volle, Rolf Haunstein, Günther Groissböck | Bernard Haitink, Zurich Opera House | Hans Hollmann | Deutsche Grammophon / 0734407 |
| 2013 | Johan Botha, Michaela Schuster, Stephen Milling, Wolfgang Koch, Wolfgang Koch, Milcho Borovinov | Christian Thielemann, Salzburg Easter Festival, Staatskapelle Dresden | Michael Schulz | Deutsche Grammophon / 0734939 DVD, 0735036 Blu-ray |
| 2014 | Simon O'Neill, Angela Denoke, René Pape, Gerald Finley, Willard White, Robert Lloyd | Antonio Pappano, Royal Opera House, Orchestra of the Royal Opera House | Stephen Langbridge | 2-DVD set: Opus Arte, ASIN B00O2YFDLG |
| 2014 | Jonas Kaufmann, Katarina Dalayman, René Pape, Peter Mattei, Evgeny Nikitin, Rúni Brattaberg | Daniele Gatti, Metropolitan Opera | François Girard | 1-DVD set: Sony Classical, ASIN B00CU55HHY |
| 2017 | Klaus Florian Vogt, Elena Pankratova, Georg Zeppenfeld, Ryan McKinney, Gerd Grochowski, Karl-Heinz Lehner | Hartmut Haenchen, Bayreuth Festival Orchestra | Uwe Eric Laufenberg | 2-DVD set: Deutsche Grammophon, ASIN B071NQ8NCG |
| 2020 | Julian Hubbard, Catherine Hunold, John Relyea, Tomas Tomasson, Thomas Gazheli, Alexei Tanovitski | Omer Meir Wellber , Teatro Massimo | Graham Vick | 2-DVD set: C Major, ASIN B09T8K84XK |
