= Der Ring des Nibelungen discography =

The four operas of Richard Wagner's cycle Der Ring des Nibelungen together take about 15 hours, which makes for several records, tapes, or CDs, and much studio time. For this reason, many full Ring recordings are the result of "unofficial" recording of live performances, particularly from the Bayreuth Festival where new productions are often broadcast by German radio. Live recordings, especially those in monaural, may have very variable sound but often preserve the excitement of a performance better than a studio recording.

== Audio recordings ==
The following lists some well-known recordings of the complete Ring Cycle:

Year	Conductor	Orchestra	Label	Stereo/Mono	Live/Studio
1949	Rudolf Moralt	Vienna Symphony Orchestra	Myto	Mono	Studio (radio broadcast)
1950	Wilhelm Furtwängler	Teatro alla Scala Orchestra	Music & Arts, Opera D'Oro, Gebhardt, Archipel	Mono	Live
1953	Wilhelm Furtwängler	Orchestra Sinfonica e Coro della RAI	EMI Classics, Gebhardt	Mono	Studio (radio broadcast)
	Clemens Krauss	Bayreuth Festival Orchestra	Gala, Archipel, Opera D'Oro, Orfeo	Mono	Live
1952–1953, 1955	Joseph Keilberth	Bayreuth Festival Orchestra	Testament	Stereo (1955 only)	Live
1956–1958	Hans Knappertsbusch	Bayreuth Festival Orchestra	Music & Arts, Melodram, Orfeo	Mono	Live
1957	Rudolf Kempe	Royal Opera House Orchestra	Testament	Mono	Live
1958–1965	Georg Solti	Vienna Philharmonic Orchestra	Decca Records, PolyGram	Stereo	Studio
1961	Rudolf Kempe	Bayreuth Festival Orchestra	Orfeo	Mono	Live
1966–1970	Herbert von Karajan	Berlin Philharmonic Orchestra	Deutsche Grammophon, PolyGram	Stereo	Studio
1966–1967	Karl Böhm	Bayreuth Festival Orchestra	Philips	Stereo	Live
1968	Hans Swarowsky	Großes Symphonieorchester	Denon Essentials	Stereo	Studio
	Wolfgang Sawallisch	Orchestra Sinfonica e Coro della RAI	Myto	Stereo	Studio (radio broadcast)
1974–1978	Reginald Goodall	English National Opera Orchestra	EMI Classics, Chandos	Stereo	Live (sung in English)
1979–1980	Pierre Boulez	Bayreuth Festival Orchestra	Philips, Deutsche Grammophon, PolyGram	Stereo	Live
1980–1983	Marek Janowski	Staatskapelle Dresden Orchestra	Eurodisc, BMG	Stereo	Studio
1987–1989	James Levine	Metropolitan Opera Orchestra	Deutsche Grammophon	Stereo	Studio
1988–1991	Bernard Haitink	Bavarian Radio Symphony Orchestra	EMI Classics	Stereo	Studio
1989	Wolfgang Sawallisch	Bavarian State Opera Orchestra	EMI Classics	Stereo	Live
1991–1992	Daniel Barenboim	Bayreuth Festival Orchestra	Warner Classics	Stereo	Live
1993–1995	Günter Neuhold	Badische Staatskapelle Orchestra	Brilliant Classics, Bella Musica, Documents	Stereo	Live
1997-1999	Roberto Paternostro	Staatstheater Kassel	Ars Produktion	Stereo	Live
1998–2001	Gustav Kuhn	Tyrol Festival Orchestra	Arte Nova	Stereo	Live
2005	Hartmut Haenchen	Netherlands Philharmonic Orchestra	Etcetera	Multichannel Stereo	Live
2006–2007	Asher Fisch	Adelaide Symphony Orchestra	Melba Recordings	Multichannel Stereo	Live
2006–2007	Lothar Zagrosek	Staatsorchester Stuttgart	Naxos	Stereo	Live
2008	Christian Thielemann	Bayreuth Festival Orchestra	BBC Opus Arte	Stereo	Live
2011	Christian Thielemann	Wiener Staatsoper	Deutsche Grammpohon	Stereo	Live
2008–2010	Simone Young	Philharmoniker Hamburg	Oehms Classics	Stereo	Live
2010–2012	Sebastian Weigle	Frankfurt Opera Orchestra	Oehms Classics	Stereo	Live
2012–2013	Marek Janowski	Berlin Radio Symphony Orchestra	PENTATONE (PTC 5186581)	Multichannel Stereo	Live concert
2015-2018	Jaap van Zweden	Hong Kong Philharmonic Orchestra	Naxos	Stereo	Live concert
2024	Fabio Luisi	Dallas Symphony Orchestra	Delos	Stereo	Live concert

The recording conducted by Georg Solti was the first stereo studio recording of the complete cycle. In a poll on the BBC Radio 3's long-running radio programme CD Review, this set was voted as the greatest recording of the 20th century. Although Solti's was the first studio stereo recording, the cycle had previously been recorded live in stereo by Decca engineers at the Bayreuth Festival in 1955 under the baton of Joseph Keilberth. Although unavailable for over 50 years, this cycle was finally released in 2006 on CD and vinyl by Testament.

Gramophone, for example, lists the Solti recording as its recommendation on its website. However, when their long-time Wagner critic Alan Blyth reviewed recordings of the Ring for the feature "Building a Library" on the BBC's CD Review (then Stereo Review) in 1986, he favoured the Böhm and Furtwängler/RAI recordings. When John Deathridge carried out a follow-up review for the programme in 1992, he favoured parts of the Goodall, Haitink and Boulez cycles for individual operas and Levine overall.

== Video recordings ==
The Ring Cycle is also available in a number of video or DVD presentations. These include:

- 1980–81: Pierre Boulez conducting the Bayreuth Festival Orchestra, stage director: Patrice Chéreau [Philips/Deutsche Grammophon]
- 1990: James Levine conducting the Metropolitan Opera Orchestra, stage director: Otto Schenk [Deutsche Grammophon 073 043-9] (part of PBS' The Metropolitan Opera Presents; also available for streaming at Met Opera on Demand)
- 1991–92: Daniel Barenboim conducting the Bayreuth Festival Orchestra, stage director: Harry Kupfer [Warner Classics]
- 2003–04: Bertrand de Billy conducting the Orchestra of the Gran Teatre del Liceu, stage director: Harry Kupfer [BBC Opus Arte]
- 2004: Lothar Zagrosek conducting the Staatsoper Stuttgart, stage directors: Joachim Schlömer (Rheingold), Christof Nel (Walküre), Jossi Wieler (Siegfried) and Peter Konwitschny (Götterdämmerung) [Tdk]
- 2006: Hartmut Haenchen conducting the Netherlands Philharmonic Orchestra, stage director: Pierre Audi [Opus Arte]
- 2006: Michael Schønwandt conducting the Royal Danish Orchestra, stage director: Kasper Holten [Decca 074 3264]
- 2007–09: Zubin Mehta conducting the Orquestra de la Comunitat Valenciana, stage director: Carlus Padrissa [C Major]
- 2010–13: Daniel Barenboim conducting the Orchestra & Chorus of Teatro alla Scala, stage director & set designer: Guy Cassiers [ArtHaus Musik 107550]
- 2011: James Levine and Fabio Luisi conducting the Metropolitan Opera Orchestra, stage director: Robert Lepage [Deutsche Grammophon 0440 073 4770 6; also Met Opera on Demand]
- 2021: Donald Runnicles conducting the Orchestra & Chorus of the Deutsche Oper Berlin, stage director: Stefan Herheim, November 2021 [Naxos NBD0156VX]
- 2022: Christian Thielemann conducting the Berlin Staatskapelle, stage director & set designer: Dmitri Tcherniakov, October 2022 [Unitel Editions 812004]
- 2024–26: Simone Young conducting the Orchestra & Chorus of Teatro alla Scala, staging: David McVicar [LaScalaTv]

The Boulez, Barenboim, Zagrosek, and Haenchen performances are also available as audio recordings.

== See also ==
- Das Rheingold discography
- Die Walküre discography
- Siegfried discography
- Götterdämmerung discography
