= Götterdämmerung discography =

This is a discography of Götterdämmerung, the fourth of the four operas that make up Der Ring des Nibelungen (The Ring of the Nibelung), by Richard Wagner, which received its premiere at the Bayreuth Festspielhaus on 17 August 1876.

== Recordings ==
Year	Cast Siegfried Brünnhilde Hagen Gunther Gutrune Alberich Waltraute	Conductor, Opera house and orchestra	Label
1936	Lauritz Melchior; Marjorie Lawrence; Ludwig Hofmann; Friedrich Schorr; Dorothee Manski; Eduard Habich; Kathryn Meisle	Artur Bodanzky; Orchestra of the Metropolitan Opera	CD: Naxos Historical
1942	Set Svanholm; Marta Fuchs; Frederick Dalberg; Egmont Koch; Else Fischer; Robert Burg; Camilla Kailab	Karl Elmendorff; Bayreuth Festival Orchestra & chorus (Recording at Bayreuth Festival)	CD: Music & Arts; Cat: CD 1058; Mono, Live
1947	Set Svanholm; Astrid Varnay; Emanuel List; Herbert Janssen; Rose Bampton; Fred Destal; Lydia Kinderman	Erich Kleiber; Teatro Colon	CD: Gebhardt
1949	Günther Treptow; Gertrude Grob-Prandl; Ludwig Weber; Karl Kamann; Hilde Konetzni; Adolf Vogel; Rosette Anday	Rudolf Moralt; Vienna Symphony Orchestra & chorus	CD: Myto; Cat: 4MCD 973.159; Mono
1950	Max Lorenz; Kirsten Flagstad; Ludwig Weber; Josef Herrmann; Hilde Konetzni; Alois Pernerstorfer; Elisabeth Höngen	Wilhelm Furtwängler; Teatro alla Scala orchestra & chorus	CD: Opera d'Oro; Cat: OPD1501 (complete Ring) Mono, Live
1951	Bernd Aldenhoff; Astrid Varnay; Ludwig Weber; Hermann Uhde; Martha Mödl; Heinrich Pflanzl; Elisabeth Höngen	Hans Knappertsbusch; Bayreuth Festival Orchestra & chorus (Recording at Bayreuth Festival)	CD: Testament; Cat: SBT4175; Mono, Live
1951	Set Svanholm; Helen Traubel; Dezső Ernster; Herbert Janssen; Regina Resnik; Gerhard Pechner; Margaret Harshaw	Fritz Stiedry; Orchestra of the Metropolitan Opera	CD: Gebhardt
1952	Max Lorenz; Astrid Varnay; Josef Greindl; Hermann Uhde; Martha Mödl; Gustav Neidlinger; Ruth Siewert	Joseph Keilberth; Bayreuth Festival Orchestra & chorus (Recording at Bayreuth Festival)	CD: Myto; Cat: 4CD 00206; Mono, Live
1953	Wolfgang Windgassen; Astrid Varnay; Josef Greindl; Hermann Uhde; Natalie Hinsch-Gröndahl; Gustav Neidlinger; Ira Malaniuk	Clemens Krauss; Bayreuth Festival Orchestra & chorus (Recording at Bayreuth Festival)	CD: Opera d'Oro; Cat: OPD1500 (complete Ring) Mono, Live
1953	Ludwig Suthaus; Martha Mödl; Josef Greindl; Alfred Poell; Sena Jurinac; Alois Pernerstorfer; Margarete Klose	Wilhelm Furtwängler; Orchestra Sinfonica e Coro della RAI	CD: EMI; Cat: CZS 7 67136 2 Mono
1955	Wolfgang Windgassen; Astrid Varnay; Josef Greindl; Hermann Uhde; Gré Brouwenstijn; Gustav Neidlinger; Maria von Ilosvay	Joseph Keilberth; Bayreuth Festival Orchestra & chorus (Recording at Bayreuth Festival)	CD: Testament; Cat: SBT41393; Stereo, Live
1955	Wolfgang Windgassen; Martha Mödl; Josef Greindl; Hermann Uhde; Gré Brouwenstijn; Gustav Neidlinger; Maria von Ilosvay	Joseph Keilberth; Bayreuth Festival Orchestra & chorus (Recording at Bayreuth Festival)	CD: Testament; Cat: SBT41433; Stereo, Live
1955	Bernd Aldenhoff; Birgit Nilsson; Gottlob Frick; Hermann Uhde; Leonie Rysanek; Otakar Kraus; Ira Malaniuk	Hans Knappertsbusch; Bavarian Radio Symphony Orchestra	CD: Orfeo
1956	Set Svanholm; Kirsten Flagstad; Egil Nordsjø; Waldemar Johnsen; Ingrid Bjoner; Per Grönneberg; Eva Gustavson	Øivin Fjeldstad; Norwegian Radio Chorus & Orchestra	CD: Naxos; Cat: 8.112066-69; Mono, Live
1957	Wolfgang Windgassen; Birgit Nilsson; Kurt Böhme; Hermann Uhde; Elisabeth Lindermeier; Otakar Kraus; Maria von Ilosvay	Rudolf Kempe; Royal Opera House orchestra & chorus	CD: Testament; Cat: SBT131426 (complete Ring) Mono, Live
1964	Wolfgang Windgassen; Birgit Nilsson; Gottlob Frick; Dietrich Fischer-Dieskau; Claire Watson; Gustav Neidlinger; Christa Ludwig	Georg Solti; Wiener Philharmoniker, Wiener Staatsoper chorus	CD: Decca; Cat: 455 569-2; Stereo
1967	Wolfgang Windgassen; Birgit Nilsson; Josef Greindl; Thomas Stewart; Ludmila Dvořáková; Gustav Neidlinger; Martha Mödl	Karl Böhm; Bayreuth Festival Orchestra & chorus (Recording at Bayreuth Festival)	CD: Philips; Cat: 412 488-2; Stereo, Live
1969	Helge Brilioth; Helga Dernesch; Karl Ridderbusch; Thomas Stewart; Gundula Janowitz; Zoltán Kelemen; Christa Ludwig	Herbert von Karajan; Berliner Philharmoniker, Deutsche Oper Berlin chorus	CD: Deutsche Grammophon; Cat: 457 795-2; Stereo
1977	Alberto Remedios; Rita Hunter; Aage Haugland; Norman Welsby; Margaret Curphey; Derek Hammond-Stroud; Katherine Pring	Reginald Goodall; English National Opera	CD: Chandos; Performed in English
1979	Manfred Jung; Gwyneth Jones; Fritz Hübner; Franz Mazura; Jeannine Altmeyer; Hermann Becht; Gwendolyn Killebrew	Pierre Boulez; Bayreuth Festival Orchestra & chorus (Recording at Bayreuth Festival)	CD: Philips; Cat: 434 424-2; Stereo
1983	René Kollo; Jeannine Altmeyer; Matti Salminen; Hans Günter Nöcker; Norma Sharp; Siegmund Nimsgern; Ortrun Wenkel	Marek Janowski; Staatskapelle Dresden, Staatsoper Dresden chorus	CD: Eurodisc / RCA; Cat: RCA B00011MJV6 (complete Ring) Stereo
1987	Elliot Palay; Laila Andersson-Palme; Aage Haugland; Lars Waage; Eva Johansson; Jorgen Klint; Margrethe Danielsen	Francesco Cristofoli; Aarhus Symphony Orchestra	CD: Sterling
1989	Reiner Goldberg; Hildegard Behrens; Matti Salminen; Bernd Weikl; Cheryl Studer; Ekkehard Wlaschiha; Hanna Schwarz	James Levine; Metropolitan Opera orchestra & chorus	CD: Deutsche Grammophon; Cat: 429 385-2; Stereo
1989	René Kollo; Hildegard Behrens; Matti Salminen; Hans Günter Nöcker; Lisbeth Balslev; Ekkehard Wlaschiha; Waltraud Meier	Wolfgang Sawallisch; Bavarian State Opera orchestra & chorus (Recorded at National Theater, Munich)	CD: EMI; Cat: 724357273121 (complete Ring) Stereo, Live
1990	Siegfried Jerusalem; Hildegard Behrens; Matti Salminen; Anthony Raffell; Hanna Lisowska; Ekkehard Wlaschiha; Christa Ludwig	James Levine; Metropolitan Opera Orchestra & Corus (Recorded live, 5 May; Otto Schenk/Günther Schneider-Siemssen production)	SD video: Met Opera on Demand (complete ring)
1991	Siegfried Jerusalem; Éva Marton; John Tomlinson; Thomas Hampson; Eva-Maria Bundschuh; Theo Adam; Marjana Lipovšek	Bernard Haitink; Bavarian Radio Symphony Orchestra; Bayerischen Rundfunks chorus	CD: EMI; Cat: CDS 7 54485 2 Stereo
1991	Siegfried Jerusalem; Anne Evans; Philip Kang; Bodo Brinkmann; Eva-Maria Bundschuh; Günter von Kannen; Waltraud Meier	Daniel Barenboim; Bayreuth Festival Orchestra & chorus (Recording at Bayreuth Festival)	CD: Teldec; Cat: 4509941942; Stereo, Live
1995	Edward Cook; Carla Pohl; Markku Tervo; Bodo Brinkmann; Gabriele Maria Ronge; Oleg Bryjak; Zlatomira Nikolova	Günter Neuhold; Badische Staatskapelle	CD: Brilliant Classics
2002–2003	Albert Bonnema; Luana DeVol; Roland Bracht; Hernan Iturralde; Eva-Maria Westbroek; Franz-Josef Kappellmann; Tichina Vaughn	Lothar Zagrosek; Staatsoper Stuttgart orchestra & chorus (Recording at Württembergische Staatsoper).	DVD: TDK "Mediactive", Cat: DV-OPRDNG; CD: Naxos Records; Cat: 8.660179-82; Stereo, Live
2003–2004	John Treleaven; Deborah Polaski; Matti Salminen; Falk Struckmann; Elisabete Matos; Günter von Kannen; Julia Juon	Bertrand de Billy; Orquestra Simfònica del Gran Teatre del Liceu	DVD: Opus Arte; ASIN: B000IFRPY6; Surround Sound, Live
2004	Timothy Mussard; Lisa Gasteen; Duccio Dal Monte; Jonathan Summers; Joanna Cole; John Wegner; Elizabeth Campbell	Asher Fisch; Adelaide Symphony Orchestra	CD: Melba
2006	Stig Fogh Andersen; Iréne Theorin; Peter Klaveness; Guido Paëvatalu; Ylva Kihlberg; Sten Byriel; Anette Bod	Michael Schønwandt; Royal Danish Orchestra	DVD: Decca
2009	Stephen Gould; Linda Watson; Hans-Peter König; Ralf Lukas; Edith Haller; Andrew Shore; Christa Mayer	Christian Thielemann; Bayreuth Festival Orchestra & chorus (Recording at Bayreuth Festival)	CD: Opus Arte; Cat: OA CD9000B D Stereo, Live
2010	Lance Ryan; Jennifer Wilson; Matti Salminen; Ralf Lukas; Elisabete Matos; Franz-Josef Kapellmann; Catherine Wyn-Rogers	Zubin Mehta; Orquestra de la Comunitat Valenciana; Cor de la Generalitat Valenciana	DVD Unitel Classica; ASIN: B002ZCUEKM
2013	Lance Ryan; Petra Lang; Matti Salminen; Markus Brück; Edith Haller; Jochen Schmeckenbecher; Marina Prudenskaya	Marek Janowski; Berlin Radio Symphony Orchestra	CD: Pentatone
2018	Daniel Brenna; Gun-Brit Barkmin; Eric Halfvarson; Shenyang; Amanda Majeski; Peter Kálmán; Michelle DeYoung	Jaap van Zweden; Hong Kong Philharmonic	CD: Naxos
2022	Corby Welch; Linda Watson; Sami Luttinen; Richard Šveda; Anke Krabbe; Jochen Schmeckenbecher; Sarah Ferede	Axel Kober; Duisburg Philharmonic	CD: cAvi
