= Elektra discography =

This is a list of recordings of Elektra, a one-act opera by Richard Strauss with a German-language libretto by Hugo von Hofmannsthal. The work was first performed at the Dresden State Opera on 25 January 1909.

== Recordings ==
Year	Cast (Elektra, Chrysothemis, Klytemnestra, Orestes, Aegisthus)	Conductor, Opera house and orchestra	Label
1947	Erna Schlüter; Ljuba Welitsch; Paul Schöffler; Walter Widdop	Thomas Beecham; Royal Philharmonic Orchestra & chorus (final scenes only, recorded on 13–15 October)	CD: Naxos Records; Cat: 8.111372
1949	Astrid Varnay; Irene Jessner; Elena Nicolaidi; Herbert Janssen; Frederick Jagel	Dimitri Mitropoulos; New York Philharmonic orchestra & chorus (recorded on 25 December)	CD: Guild Immortal; Cat: GHCD 2213/4
1953	Astrid Varnay; Leonie Rysanek; Res Fischer; Hans Hotter; Helmut Melchert	Richard Kraus; WDR Symphony Orchestra Cologne & chorus (recorded in studio on 22–28 August)	CD: Capriccio; Cat: C5008
1957	Inge Borkh; Lisa Della Casa; Jean Madeira; Kurt Böhme; Max Lorenz	Dimitri Mitropoulos; Vienna Philharmonic orchestra Vienna State Opera chorus	CD: Orfeo; Cat: C456972I
1957	Sigrid Ekkehard; Hedwig Müller-Bütow; Margarete Klose; Gerhard Niese; Günter Treptow	Lovro von Matačić; Staatskapelle Berlin & Chor der Deutschen Staatsoper Berlin (Mono, Live, October 3, 1957)	CD: Weitblick; Cat: SSS0049-2
1958	Gerda Lammers; Hedwig Müller-Bütow; Georgine von Milinković; Otakar Kraus; Edgar Evans	Rudolf Kempe; Royal Opera House orchestra & chorus	CD: Royal Opera House Heritage; Cat: ROHS 005
1960	Inge Borkh; Marianne Schech; Jean Madeira; Dietrich Fischer-Dieskau; Fritz Uhl	Karl Böhm; Staatskapelle Dresden; Dresden State Opera House chorus	CD: Deutsche Grammophon; Cat: 445329
1964	Astrid Varnay; Hildegard Hillebrecht; Martha Mödl; Eberhard Wächter; James King	Herbert von Karajan; Vienna Philharmonic orchestra Vienna State Opera chorus	CD: Orfeo; Cat: C298922I
1965	Birgit Nilsson; Leonie Rysanek; Regina Resnik; Eberhard Wächter; Wolfgang Windgassen	Karl Böhm; Vienna State Opera orchestra & chorus	CD: Orfeo; Cat: C886142I
1967	Birgit Nilsson; Marie Collier; Regina Resnik; Tom Krause; Gerhard Stolze	Georg Solti; Vienna Philharmonic orchestra Vienna State Opera chorus	CD: Decca Records; Cat: 830302
1980	Birgit Nilsson; Leonie Rysanek; Mignon Dunn; Donald McIntyre; Robert Nagy	James Levine; Metropolitan Opera orchestra & chorus	DVD: Deutsche Grammophon; Cat: 073 4111
1981	Leonie Rysanek; Catarina Ligendza; Astrid Varnay; Dietrich Fischer-Dieskau; Hans Beirer	Karl Böhm; Vienna Philharmonic orchestra Vienna State Opera chorus	DVD: Deutsche Grammophon; Cat: 073 4095
1988	Hildegard Behrens; Nadine Secunde; Christa Ludwig; Jorma Hynninen; Ragnar Ulfung	Seiji Ozawa; Boston Symphony Orchestra; Tanglewood Music Festival chorus	CD: Decca; Cat: 470583
1989	Éva Marton; Cheryl Studer; Brigitte Fassbaender; Franz Grundheber; James King	Claudio Abbado; Vienna State Opera orchestra & chorus	DVD: ArtHaus Musik; Cat: 100048
1990	Gwyneth Jones; Anne Evans; Leonie Rysanek; Wolfgang Schöne; Ronald Hamilton	Jeffrey Tate; Orchestre de la Suisse Romande; Grand Théâtre de Genève chorus (recorded on 10 March)	CD: Claves; Cat: 50-2514/15
1990	Éva Marton; Cheryl Studer; Marjana Lipovšek; Bernd Weikl; Hermann Winkler	Wolfgang Sawallisch; Bavarian Radio Symphony Orchestra & chorus	CD: EMI Classics; Cat: 9190
1994	Hildegard Behrens; Deborah Voigt; Brigitte Fassbaender; Donald McIntyre; James King	James Levine; Metropolitan Opera orchestra & chorus (telecast of 22 January)	DVD: The Met Opera; Cat: 811357013274
1995	Deborah Polaski; Alessandra Marc; Waltraud Meier; Falk Struckmann; Johan Botha	Daniel Barenboim; Berlin State Opera orchestra & chorus	CD: Teldec; Cat: 99175
1995	Hildegard Behrens; Luana DeVol; Leonie Rysanek; Wolfgang Schöne; Daniel Galvez-Vallejo	Friedemann Layer; Opéra national de Montpellier orchestra & chorus	CD: Actes Sud; Cat: AT 34109
1997	Alessandra Marc; Deborah Voigt; Hanna Schwarz; Samuel Ramey; Siegfried Jerusalem	Giuseppe Sinopoli; Vienna Philharmonic orchestra Vienna State Opera chorus	CD: Deutsche Grammophon; Cat: 453429
2004	Deborah Polaski; Anne Schwanewilms; Felicity Palmer; Franz Grundheber; Graham Clark	Semyon Bychkov; WDR Symphony Orchestra Cologne & chorus	CD: Profil Medien; Cat: PH 05022
2006	Eva Johansson; Melanie Diener; Marjana Lipovšek; Alfred Muff; Rudolf Schasching	Christoph von Dohnányi; Zürich Opera House orchestra & chorus	DVD: TDK; Cat: DVWW-OPELEK
2010	Jeanne-Michèle Charbonnet; Angela Denoke; Felicity Palmer; Matthias Goerne; Ian Storey	Valery Gergiev; London Symphony Orchestra and Chorus	CD: LSO Live
2010	Iréne Theorin; Eva-Maria Westbroek; Waltraud Meier; René Pape; Robert Gambill	Daniele Gatti; Vienna Philharmonic orchestra Vienna State Opera chorus (Stage director: Nikolaus Lehnhoff; recorded at Salzburg Festival)	Blu-ray/DVD: ArtHaus Musik
2014	Ingela Brimberg; Susanna Levonen; Ingrid Tobiasson; Thomas Lander; Magnus Kyhle	Rumon Gamba; NorrlandsOperan orchestra & chorus (recorded on 19 & 21 August)	DVD: Unitel Classica; Cat: 731808
2016	Nina Stemme; Adrianne Pieczonka; Waltraud Meier; Eric Owens; Burkhard Ulrich	Esa-Pekka Salonen; Metropolitan Opera orchestra & chorus (Production: Patrice Chéreau; recorded live on 30 April)	HD video: Met Opera on Demand
