= Josephine Veasey =

British mezzo-soprano (1930–2022)

Josephine Veasey CBE (10 July 1930 – 22 February 2022) was a British mezzo-soprano, particularly associated with Wagner and Berlioz roles.

== Early years ==
Josephine Veasey was born in Camberwell on 10 July 1930. She studied with Audrey Langford, and became a member of the Royal Opera House chorus in 1949. She made her debut as a soloist on 5 July 1955 as the Page in Salome, followed by Cherubino in Le nozze di Figaro, and later roles included Dorabella in Così fan tutte, Marina in Boris Godunov, Preziosilla in La forza del destino, Eboli in Don Carlos, Amneris in Aida, and the title role in Carmen, amongst others. Beginning in 1957, she became a regular guest at the Glyndebourne Festival, notably as Charlotte in Werther and Octavian in Der Rosenkavalier.

== Career ==
Noticed and encouraged by Georg Solti, Veasey began adding Wagner roles to her repertoire, notably Waltraute and Fricka in Die Walküre. She commercially recorded the role of Fricka for Deutsche Grammophon with Herbert von Karajan. Her other major roles included Brangäne in Tristan und Isolde, Venus in Tannhäuser, and Kundry in Parsifal. Under Colin Davis' guidance, she also became an illustrious interpreter of Berlioz's works, singing both Didon and Cassandre in Les Troyens, and Marguerite in La damnation de Faust, which she also recorded for him.

On the international scene, Veasey appeared at the Paris Opéra, the Aix-en-Provence Festival, at La Scala in Milan, the Vienna State Opera, the Salzburg Festival, the Metropolitan Opera, and the San Francisco Opera. In contemporary works, she created the role of Andromache in Michael Tippett's King Priam in 1962, and in 1976 created The Emperor in Hans Werner Henze's We Come to the River.

Although not associated with the bel canto repertoire, in 1966 Veasey recorded the role of Agnese in Beatrice di Tenda, opposite Joan Sutherland and Luciano Pavarotti, under Richard Bonynge, and appeared as Adalgisa in Norma, opposite Montserrat Caballé and Jon Vickers, in the 1974 production at the Théâtre Antique d'Orange. Veasey retired from the stage in 1982; her last performance was as Herodias at Covent Garden, in the same opera in which she began her solo career, Salome by Richard Strauss.

== Death ==
Veasey died at a care home in Whitchurch, Hampshire, on 22 February 2022, aged 91.

== Recordings ==
- 1962 – The Page of Herodias in Salome – with Birgit Nilsson, Gerhard Stolze, Grace Hoffman, Eberhard Wächter, Waldemar Kmentt – Wiener Philharmoniker, conducted by Sir Georg Solti (Decca Records).
- 1962 – Roßweiße in Die Walküre – with Jon Vickers, Birgit Nilsson, George London, David Ward, Rita Gorr – London Symphony Orchestra, conducted by Erich Leinsdorf (Decca Records).
- 1963 – Béatrice in Béatrice et Bénédict – with April Cantelo, Helen Watts, John Shirley-Quirk, Eric Shilling, John Cameron – St. Anthony Singers, London Symphony Orchestra, conducted by Sir Colin Davis (Decca Records).
- 1964 – Third Boy in Die Zauberflöte – with Nicolai Gedda, Gundula Janowitz, Walter Berry, Lucia Popp, Gottlob Frick, Franz Crass, Elisabeth Schwarzkopf, Christa Ludwig, Marga Höffgen, Gerhard Unger, Agnes Giebel, Anna Reynolds – Philharmonia Orchestra and Chorus, conducted by Otto Klemperer (EMI).
- 1964 – Geneviève in Pelléas et Mélisande – with Erna Spoorenberg, Camille Maurane, John Shirley-Quirk, George London – Le Chœur du Grand Théâtre de Genève, L'Orchestre de la Suisse Romande, conducted by Ernest Ansermet (Decca Records).
- 1966 – Hermia in A Midsummer Night's Dream – with Alfred Deller, Elizabeth Harwood, John Shirley-Quirk, Helen Watts, Peter Pears, Thomas Hemsley, Heather Harper, Owen Brannigan, Norman Lumsden, Robert Tear – London Symphony Orchestra, conducted by Benjamin Britten (Decca Records).
- 1966 – Agnese del Maino in Beatrice di Tenda – with Joan Sutherland, Cornelius Opthof, Luciano Pavarotti, Joseph Ward – Ambrosian Opera Chorus, London Symphony Orchestra, conducted by Richard Bonynge (Decca Records).
- 1967 – Fricka in Die Walküre – with Jon Vickers, Martti Talvela, Thomas Stewart, Gundula Janowitz, Régine Crespin – Berliner Philharmoniker, conducted by Herbert von Karajan (Deutsche Grammophon).
- 1968 – Fricka in Das Rheingold – with Dietrich Fischer-Dieskau, Robert Kerns, Donald Grobe, Gerhard Stolze, Zoltan Kelemen, Erwin Wohlfahrt, Martti Talvela, Karl Ridderbusch, Oralia Dominguez, Helen Donath, Edda Moser, Anna Reynolds – Berliner Philharmoniker, conducted by Herbert von Karajan (Deutsche Grammophon).
- 1969 – contralto soloist in a recording of Berlioz's song La captive, Op. 12 – other soloists include Sheila Armstrong, John Shirley-Quirk – London Symphony Orchestra, conducted by Sir Colin Davis (Philips Records).
- 1970 – contralto soloist in Verdi's Requiem – with Martina Arroyo, Plácido Domingo, Ruggero Raimondi – London Symphony Orchestra and Chorus, conducted by Leonard Bernstein (Columbia Records).
- 1970 – Dido in Les Troyens – with Jon Vickers, Berit Lindholm, Peter Glossop, Heather Begg, Roger Soyer, Anne Howells, Ian Partridge, Elizabeth Bainbridge, Ryland Davies, Raimund Herincx – Chorus and Orchestra of the Royal Opera House, Covent Garden, conducted by Sir Colin Davis (Philips Records).
- 1970 – Dido in Dido and Aeneas – with John Shirley-Quirk, Helen Donath, Elizabeth Bainbridge, Gillian Knight, Thomas Allen – John Alldis Choir, Academy of St. Martin in the Fields, conducted by Sir Colin Davis (Philips Records).
- 1970 – contralto soloist in Beethoven's Symphony No. 9 – with Jane Marsh, Plácido Domingo, Sherrill Milnes – New England Conservatory Chorus, Boston Symphony Orchestra, conducted by Erich Leinsdorf (RCA).
- 1973 – Marguerite in La Damnation de Faust – with Nicolai Gedda, Jules Bastin, Richard Van Allan, Gillian Knight – Wandsworth School Boys' Choir, Ambrosian Singers, London Symphony Orchestra and Chorus, conducted by Sir Colin Davis (Philips Records).
- 1975 – contralto soloist in Verdi's Requiem – with Heather Harper, Hans Sotin – London Philharmonic Orchestra and Choir, conducted by Carlos Païta (Lodia Records, reissued Decca Records).
- 1980 – Queen Gertrude in Hamlet – with Thomas Allen, Christine Barbaux – Buxton Festival Choir, The Manchester Camerata, conducted by Anthony Hose (private label; live recording from the Buxton Festival).

== Sources ==
- Pâris, Alain, Le Dictionnaire des interprètes, Paris: Éditions Robert Laffont, 1989 ISBN 2-221-06660-X
- Warrack, John and Ewan West, The Oxford Dictionary of Opera, (1992), ISBN 0-19-869164-5
