= Ekaterina Gubanova =

Mezzo-soprano opera singer

Ekaterina Gubanova (Russian: Екатерина Губанова; born 1979) is a Russian mezzo-soprano opera singer who has performed at major international opera houses, including the Teatro alla Scala in Milan, the Paris Opera, the Metropolitan Opera in New York, the Royal Opera in London, the Vienna State Opera, the Salzburg Festival, and the Bavarian State Opera in Munich.

== Early life and training ==
Gubanova was born in Moscow in 1979. Early in her life she studied piano, then branched into choral conducting and enrolled at the Moscow Conservatory, graduating with honors in that field. Later she switched gears and undertook singing studies at the Moscow Conservatory and then at the Sibelius Academy in Helsinki. In 2001 she won the Grand Prix and Audience awards at the Marmande International Singing Competition in France.

In 2002 she became a member of the Young Artists Program at the Royal Opera, Covent Garden, where she sang the supporting roles of Flora in Verdi's La traviata (beginning on 14 December 2002, conducted by Paolo Carignani), the Second Maid in Richard Strauss's Elektra (beginning on 31 March, conducted by Semyon Bychkov), the Third Lady in Mozart's Die Zauberflöte (23 and 27 June, conducted by Philippe Jordan), the Hostess of the Inn in Mussorgsky's Boris Godunov (beginning on 22 September, conducted by Bychkov), Suzuki in Puccini's Madama Butterfly (1 and 4 November, conducted by Paul Wynne Griffiths), Alisa in Donizetti's Lucia di Lammermoor (beginning on 29 November, conducted by Evelino Pidò), and Bianca in Britten's The Rape of Lucretia (beginning on 23 April 2004, conducted by Alexander Briger).

In 2004 she won second prize in the Mirjam Helin International Singing Competition in Helsinki.

In October 2004 she sang the minor role of Barbara in Walter Braunfels's Prinzessin Brambilla at the Wexford Festival Opera with Daniele Belardinelli conducting the Cracow Philharmonic Orchestra. The production was recorded, and David Gutman, writing in Gramophone, gave "a muted cheer for dusting off an opera, all too justly neglected" and remarks "the lacklustre orchestral playing and the heroine's raw and unfocused singing are enough to destroy any atmosphere that might be generated. Ekaterina Gubanova shows much more talent...."

== Career ==
She debuted with the Opéra National de Paris in 2005 at the Opéra Bastille in the minor role of the Third Lady in Die Zauberflöte, but gained critical notice there in the same year when she sang Brangäne in Wagner's Tristan und Isolde, in a production by Peter Sellars, conducted by Valery Gergiev. This became a signature role which she has performed all over the world, including in Baden-Baden, Rotterdam, Berlin, Tokyo, Saint Petersburg, Munich, Madrid, and Valencia.

Since her debut in Paris she has also performed at the Teatro alla Scala in Milan, the Metropolitan Opera, the Royal Opera, the Vienna State Opera , the Bavarian State Opera, the Deutsche Oper Berlin, the Semperoper in Dresden, the Teatro Real Madrid, the Moscow Bolshoi Theater, the Rome Opera, the Teatro San Carlo in Naples, the Teatro Comunale di Bologna, the Gran Teatre Barcelona, the Lyric Opera of Chicago, the National Opera Amsterdam, and the opera houses of Rotterdam, Florence, Valencia, Buenos Aires, Toronto, and Tokyo and in Israel.

She has also made guest appearances at the BBC Proms, in the Festspielhaus Baden-Baden, at the Salzburg Festival, at the Lucerne Festival and at the Maggio Musicale Fiorentino. At the Bayreuth Festival from 2019 to 2021 and in 2023 she sang the role of Venus in Tannhäuser. She has also performed there Brangäne in Tristan und Isolde (2022) and Kundry in Parsifal (2023).

Gubanova has worked with many well-known conductors, including Daniel Barenboim, Semyon Bychkov, Gustavo Dudamel, Valery Gergiev, Zubin Mehta, Riccardo Muti, James Levine, Kent Nagano, Simon Rattle, Mark Elder and Esa-Pekka Salonen.

Her role repertoire as an opera singer mainly includes operas by Wagner and Verdi as well as works by Russian and French composers. Due to the flexibility of her voice, she also took on alto roles such as Erda. Gubanova also performs in concerts, oratorios and art song recitals, her repertoire including Beethoven's 9th Symphony, Verdi's Messa da Requiem, Rossini's Stabat Mater , as well as in works by Gustav Mahler: the Symphony No. 2, Das Lied von der Erde and the Rueckert-Lieder.

== Awards ==
- 2001: International Marmande Competition, France (Grand Prix and audience award)
- 2004: Mirjam Helin International Singing Competition, Helsinki (2nd prize)
- 2020: Casta Diva Award in the category "Singer of the Year"

== Recordings ==
=== Video ===
- 2009: Offenbach's Les contes d'Hoffmann, Metropolitan Opera, conducted by James Levine, with Kathleen Kim (Olympia), Anna Netrebko (Antonia), Ekaterina Gubanova (Giulietta), Joseph Calleja (Hoffmann). Production: Bartlett Sher; TV director: Gary Halvorson. Recorded at the Metropolitan Opera House (Lincoln Center), New York City, on 15 October 2011. Streaming HD video: Met Opera on Demand.
- 2010: Wagner's Die Walküre, Teatro alla Scala, conducted by Daniel Barenboim, with Simon O'Neill (Siegmund), John Tomlinson (Hunding), Vitalij Kowaljow (Wotan), Waltraud Meier (Sieglinde), Nina Stemme (Brünnhilde), Ekaterina Gubanova (Fricka). Stage director: Guy Cassiers. Recorded live, 7 December 2010, Milan. Blu-ray: Arthaus Musik.
- 2011: Donizetti's Anna Bolena, Metropolitan Opera, conducted by Marco Armiliato, with Anna Netrebko (Anna Bolena), Ekaterina Gubanova (Giovanna), Stephen Costello (Riccardo), Ildar Abdrazakov (Enrico). Production: David McVicar; TV director: Gary Halvorson. Recorded at the Metropolitan Opera House (Lincoln Center), New York City, on 15 October 2011. Streaming HD video: Met Opera on Demand.
- 2015: Bellini's Norma, Gran Teatre del Liceu, conducted by Renato Palumbo, with Sondra Radvanovsky (Norma), Gregory Kunde (Pollione), Ekaterina Gubanova (Adalgisa), Raymond Aceto (Oroveso). Stage director: Kevin Newbury. Recorded live, Gran Teatre del Liceu, February 2015. Blu-ray: C Major.
- 2015: Bartók's Bluebeard's Castle, Paris Opera, conducted by Esa-Pekka Salonen, with John Relyea (Duke Bluebeard), Ekaterina Gubanova (Judith). Stage director: Krzysztof Warlikowski; Director: Stéphane Lissner. Recorded live, Palais Garnier, December 2015. Blu-ray: Arthaus Musik.
- 2016: Wagner's Tristan und Isolde, Metropolitan Opera, conducted by Simon Rattle, with Stuart Skelton (Tristan), Nina Stemme (Isolde), Ekaterina Gubanova (Brangäne), René Pape (König Marke), Evgeny Nikitin (Kurwenal). Stage direction: Mariusz Treliński; TV director: Gary Halvorson. Recorded at the Metropolitan Opera House (Lincoln Center), New York City, 8 October 2016. Streaming HD video: Met Opera on Demand.
- 2018: Wagner's Tristan und Isolde, Staatsoper Berlin, conducted by Daniel Barenboim, with Andreas Schager (Tristan), Anja Kampe (Isolde), Ekaterina Gubanova (Brangäne), Stephen Milling (König Marke), Boaz Daniel (Kurwenal). Stage direction: Dmitri Tcherniakov; video director: Andy Sommer. Recorded live at Staatsoper Unter den Linden, Berlin, April 2018. Staatsopernchor; Staatskapelle Berlin. DVD and Blu-Ray: Bel Air Classiques, [Paris], 2022.
- 2018: Mahler's Symphony No. 2 "Resurrection", Vienna Philharmonic, conducted by Andris Nelsons, with Lucy Crowe (soprano) and Ekaterina Gubanova (mezzo-soprano). Recorded live, 28–29 July, Salzburg Festival. Blu-ray: C Major.
- 2018: The Peace Concert, Vienna Philharmonic, conducted by Franz Welser-Möst, with Yuja Wang (piano), Elsa Dreisig (soprano), Ekaterina Gubanova (mezzo-soprano), Daniel Behle (tenor), Ryan Speedo Green (bass). Recorded live, November 2018, Versailles, France. Blu-ray: Deutsche Grammophon.
- 2020: Wagner's Lohengrin, Staatsoper Berlin, conducted by Matthias Pintscher, with Roberto Alagna (Lohengrin), Vida Mikneviciuté (Elsa), Ekaterina Gubanova (Ortrud), Martin Gantner (Telramund), René Pape (König Heinrich), Adam Kutny (Heerrufer). Stage director: Calixto Bieito. Recorded live, Staatsoper Berlin, 13 December 2020. HD video: EuroArts.
- 2022: Cherubini's Medea, Metropolitan Opera, conducted by Carlo Rizzi, with Sondra Radvanovsky (Medea), Matthew Polenzani (Giasone), Janai Brugger (Glauce), Ekaterina Gubanova (Neris), Michele Pertusi (Creonte). Production: David McVicar; Directed by: Gary Halvorson. Recorded at the Metropolitan Opera House (Lincoln Center), New York City, on 22 October 2022. Streaming HD video: Met Opera on Demand.

=== Audio ===
- 2012: Wagner's Das Rheingold, Mariinsky Orchestra, conducted by Valery Gergiev, with René Pape (Wotan), Nikolai Putilin (Alberich), Andrei Popov (Mime), Stephan Rügamer (Loge), Ekaterina Gubanova (Fricka), Alexei Markov (Donner), Sergei Semishkur (Froh), Viktoria Yastrebova (Freia), Zlata Bulycheva (Erda), Evgeny Nikitin (Fasolt), Mikhail Petrenko (Fafner), Zhanna Dombrovskaya (Woglinde), Irina Vasilieva (Wellgunde), Ekaterina Sergeeva (Flosshilde). Recorded June 7–10, 2010, and February 17–18, and April 10, 2012, Concert Hall of the Mariinsky Theatre, St. Petersburg, Russia. CD: Mariinsky.
- 2012: Wagner's Die Walküre, Mariinsky Orchestra, conducted by Valery Gergiev, with Anja Kampe (Sieglinde), Nina Stemme (Brünnhilde), Ekaterina Gubanova (Fricka), Jonas Kaufmann (Siegmund), René Pape (Wotan), Mikhail Petrenko (Hunding). Recorded June 2011, February and April 2012, Concert Hall of the Mariinsky Theatre. CD: Mariinsky.
- 2014: Dvořák's Rusalka, Lyric Opera of Chicago, conducted by Andrew Davis, with Ana María Martínez (Rusalka), Brandon Jovanovich (The prince), Eric Owens (Vodník), Ekaterina Gubanova (Foreign princess), Jill Grove (Ježibaba). Director: David McVicar. Recorded live, Chicago, 22 February 2014. Lyric Audio Streaming.
- 2023: Bellini's Norma, Metropolitan Opera, conducted by Maurizio Benini with Helena Dix (Norma), Michael Spyres (Pollione), Ekaterina Gubanova (Adalgisa), Christian Van Horn (Oroveso). Recorded live at the Metropolitan Opera on 25 March 2023. Streaming audio: Met Opera on Demand.

== Repertoire (selection) ==
Gubanova's engagements are documented by Operabase and Olyrix.

- Bartók: Judith in Bluebeard's Castle
- Bellini: Adalgisa in Norma
- Berlioz:
  - Cassandre in Les Troyens
  - Marguerite in La damnation de Faust
  - Mezzo-soprano in the symphonic poem Roméo et Juliette
- Bizet: title role in Carmen
- Cherubini: Neris in Medea
- Donizetti: Giovanna in Anna Bolena
- Dvořák: The foreign princess in Rusalka
- Enescu: Jocasta in Oedipe
- Gluck: Glitemnestre in Iphigénie en Aulide
- Mahler:
  - Das Lied von der Erde
  - Des Knaben Wunderhorn
  - Rückert-Lieder
  - Symphony No. 2
  - Symphony No. 3
- Massenet: Charlotte in Werther
- Mussorgsky: Marina Mniszech in Boris Godunov
- Offenbach: Giulietta in Les contes d'Hoffmann
- Poulenc: Mère Marie in Dialogues des Carmélites
- Prokofiev: Hélène Bezukhova in War and Peace
- Rimsky-Korsakov: Lyubasha in The Tsar's Bride
- Stravinsky: Jocasta in Oedipus Rex
- Tchaikovsky:
  - Olga in Eugene Onegin
  - Polina in Queen of Spades
  - Joan of Arc in The Maid of Orléans
- Verdi:
  - Eboli in Don Carlo
  - Amneris in Aida
  - Mezzo-soprano in the Messa da Requiem
- Wagner:
  - Brangäne in Tristan und Isolde
  - Venus in Tannhäuser
  - Ortrud in Lohengrin
  - Fricka and Erda in Das Rheingold
  - Fricka in Die Walküre
  - Kundry in Parsifal
