= Germán Villar =

Spanish tenor (born 1975)

Germán Villar (born 1975) is a Spanish tenor.

== Biography ==
Germán Villar was born in Valencia, Spain. The roots of his musical education lay in Madrid, where he started his education with Inés Ribadeneira. At the age of 20 he joined the Joaquim Rodrigo Conservatory in Valencia, where he was to finish his studies. Five years later he took part in the Young Artist Program of the Metropolitan Opera in New York City and worked with teachers such as Trish McCaffree, Renata Scotto and Pierre Vallet.

One year later, he made his stage debut singing Alfredo in La Traviata. In 2002 he won three awards at the Francisco-Vinas-Competition in Barcelona and joined the ensemble at the Stadttheater Gießen, Germany, where he successfully performed a number of prestigious roles, such as Pollione, Pinkerton, Lenskij and Mitch in the German premiere of André Previn's A Streetcar Named Desire.

He has a reputation as one of the leading tenors of the young generation. His outstanding stage appearance in connection with an enormous musicality makes Germán Villar a number 1 candidate for most major roles of the Italian and French repertoire.

His accession to the row of the world's finest tenors came with his role as Christian in Cyrano de Bergerac at the Teatro alla Scala in Milan, Italy in January 2008.

== Repertoire ==
- Franco Alfano - Cyrano de Bergerac (Christian)
- Vincenzo Bellini - Norma (Pollione)
- Georges Bizet - Carmen (Don Jose)
- Friedrich von Flotow - Martha (Lyonel)
- Umberto Giordano - Fedora (Loris Ipanov)
- Louis Joseph Ferdinand Hérold - Zampa (Zampa)
- Vicente Martín y Soler - Il Burbero di Buon Cuore (Valerio)
- Pietro Mascagni - Cavalleria Rusticana (Turiddu)
- Jules Massenet - Werther (Werther)
- Enric Palomar - Juana (Juan de Padilla)
- André Previn - Endstation Sehnsucht (Mitch)
- Giacomo Puccini - Madam Butterfly (Pinkerton)
- Giacomo Puccini - Il Tabarro (Luigi)
- Giacomo Puccini - Tosca (Cavaradossi)
- Johann Strauss II - Die Fledermaus (Alfred)
- Pyotr Ilyich Tchaikovsky - Eugene Onegin (Lenski)
- Pyotr Ilyich Tchaikovsky - The Maid of Orleans (Karl V)
- Giuseppe Verdi - La Traviata (Alfredo)
- Giuseppe Verdi - Nabucco (Ismaelle)
- Giuseppe Verdi - Falstaff (Fenton)
- Richard Wagner - Das Rheingold (Froh)
