= Richard Decker =

American cartoonist

Richard Decker (May 6, 1907 – November 1, 1988) a cartoonist and illustrator, studied at the Pennsylvania Museum School of Industrial Art and became famous for his cartoons published in The New Yorker.

== Works ==
Decker worked almost 40 years as a contract cartoonist for the New Yorker. He started out in 1929 with the magazine and then eventually worked his way up to becoming well known on the New Yorker's pages for cartoons. Decker's humor covers a broad spectrum from changing times to even his large family. Decker's work in ink and watercolor had been featured in several area exhibitions. He did illustrations for "Look" and the "Saturday Evening Post" and did a number of advertisements for the "Philadelphia Evening Bulletin".

== Recognition ==
Ben Yagoda has called Decker, along with Robert J. Day, "underrecognized New Yorker masters."

== Death ==
Decker died in November 1988 at Cathcart Health Care Center in Devon, Pennsylvania. He was a resident of Berwyn, Pennsylvania.
