= Frans Andersson =

Danish bass-baritone

Frans Andersson (23 May 1911, Copenhagen – 1988) was a Danish bass-baritone who sang major roles at the Cologne Opera, La Scala, Vienna Opera, Berlin State Opera, and Bayreuth.

== Early life ==
Frans Andersson was born in Copenhagen on 23 May 1911. Frans Andersson was born to Swedish parents and the eldest of their six children. His earliest memories dated back to summers spent in Småland at his grandparents' home and it was here that he found his love of nature. In his early years Andersson worked as a bank-clerk, gardener, commercial traveler, and as a soldier in Stockholm. While between employment in Sweden he became a vagrant.

Andersson discovered the range of his voice by chance while touring with a band. He decided to become a singer when he met Swedish tenor Torsten Ralf. After returning to Copenhagen, Andersson consulted the Danish tenor Vilhelm Herold who recognized his range of vocal ability and he studied with him until Herold's death in 1937. He was later admitted to Copenhagen's Royal Theatre Drama School and Opera Academy.

== Career ==
He made his debut in 1943 as Crown in the wartime production of Porgy and Bess. However, he considered King Philip in Don Carlos as his breakthrough role. A review described his stage appearance: "The figure had serenity and firmness. The screwed-up slits of his eyes and the tight lines of his mouth made his expression both sarcastically watchful and bitter at the same time. And he sang splendidly." Both performances were conducted by the Italian Egisto Tango who became an inspiration for Anderssons artistic development.

After World War II Andersson decided to study in Italy after being inspired by Italian tenor Beniamino Gigli's visit to Copenhagen, and a concert at the Albert Hall. In 1950 he moved to Germany, where he sang as Mefisto at Krefeld; followed by parts in other operas such as Don Giovanni and the Flying Dutchman. He joined the Cologne Opera, making his debut in Bizet's Ivan IV, and singing a succession of parts under the Romanian conductor Otto Ackermann.

During the following years he guest performed at the Vienna Opera and was appointed Kammersänger at the Berlin State Opera company. Here he sang with the Komische Oper troupe in Berlin under Walter Felsenstein in Richard Mohaupt's Wirtin von Pinsk, and as Sebastiano in Tiefland. He was engaged at Covent Garden, at La Scala where he sang Telramund in Lohengrin under the direction of André Cluytens, and at other theatres in Portugal, Czechoslovakia, the Netherlands, Mexico and France.

In 1958 he worked with director Wieland Wagner at the Bayreuth Festival. Here he sang as Alberich in The Ring, and as Kurwenal in Tristan and Isolde under conductor Hans Knappertsbusch. Andersson considered Wagner to be the most ingenious director in his time.

From 1959 he once more joined the Royal Theatre in Copenhagen and sang the Flying Dutchman in 1962 in Wieland Wagners mise-en-scene, and opposite Anja Silja who played the role of Senta. In 1968 he celebrated his 25th anniversary of his first association with the Royal Theatre as Boris in Mussorgsky's Boris Godunov. Critic Hans Georg Lenz described Andersson's performance as: "A Boris of breathtaking strength and unrelenting appeal both in tyrannic power and tortured humanity, a study in character expressed with great scenic authority."

In 1968 Andersson guest performed in Japan as Kurwenal in Tristan und Isolde, opposite Birgit Nilsson and Wolfgang Windgassen. He returned to Den Jyske Opera in Aarhus, Jutland, where he had sung Mozart's Don Giovanni and other major roles in 1951. He spent the last years of his life in Mols Bjerge.

A colleague once gave a description of his character as: "An unusual personality and a legend in Denmark. Wild as a viking, despotic and deep down very soft".

== Quote ==
The highest dramatic expression depends on the fact, that your voice obeys every feeling and every thought . Only through control one can reach fulfilment and perfection.

— Frans Andersson

== Major roles ==
- Tristan and Isolde – Kurwenal
- Das Rheingold – Alberich
- Lohengrin – Telramund
- Fidelio – Pizzaro
- Aida – Amonasro
- Don Carlos – King Philip
- Faust – Mefisto
- Tosca – Scarpia
- Der Freischütz – Kaspar
- Péléas and Mélisande – Golaud
- Saul and David – Saul
- Drot and Marsk – Marsk Stig

== Sources ==
- "Frans Andersson", Den Store Danske Encyklopædi
- Rying, Bent ed. (1974) Denmark: an official handbook, Volume 15, p. 831. Press and Cultural Relations Department, Royal Danish Ministry of Foreign Affairs. ISBN 87-85112-18-6
