= Enric Palomar =

Catalan composer

Enric Palomar (Badalona-Barcelona 1964) is a Catalan composer.

He studied at the Barcelona Conservatory and completed his training under Benet Casablancas and Joan Albert Amargós. His piece Interludio Alegórico (tribute to Claude Debussy) received an honourable mention in the Xth Composition Awards organized by the Catalan Government. He has written numerous chamber works for different ensembles and soloists, including the operas Ruleta, with a libretto by Anna Maria Moix and Rafael Sender, premiered at Mercat de les Flors, Barcelona, in 1998 and Juana, based on the life of Juana I of Castile, with a libretto by Rebecca Simpson, premiered at Oper Halle, Germany, in 2005, and performed afterwards at the Teatre Romea, Barcelona, and Staatstheater Darmstadt, Germany.

The Opera House of Barcelona, the Gran Teatre del Liceu, commissioned him to compose La cabeza del Bautista, based on the play of the same name by Ramón Maria del Valle-Inclán. It will be premiered on 20 April 2009.

On 2011 he has premiered also his first Piano Concerto (with Iván Martín as piano soloist) and Beceroles (cantata) at the Auditori, Barcelona.

He is also involved in jazz and popular music, specially flamenco, areas in which he is active as a composer, arranger and music director. His works include Lorca al piano a gypsy suite for four pianos, percussion, voice (flamenco and opera) and dance, as well as his collaboration with the flamenco singer Miguel Poveda in Poemas del exilio for which he wrote the music to poems by Rafael Alberti. Poemas del exilio was awarded the City of Barcelona Prize. He is currently the artistic director of the Taller de Musics.
