= Eberhard Waechter =

Austrian opera singer (1929-1992)

Eberhard Waechter

Eberhard Freiherr von Waechter (Note: The engraving on his grave stone is Waechter, different from his family "von Wächter") (9 July 1929 – 29 March 1992) was an Austrian lyric baritone (categorized as a Kavalierbariton in the German Vocal Fach System), celebrated for his performances in the operas of Mozart, Richard Wagner and Richard Strauss. After retiring from singing, he became intendant of the Vienna Volksoper and the Vienna State Opera.

== Career ==
Born in Vienna, Waechter studied at the University of Vienna and the Vienna Academy of Music. In 1953, he began voice lessons with Elisabeth Radó. That same year he made his operatic debut, as Silvio in Leoncavallo's Pagliacci, at the Vienna Volksoper. In 1954, he debuted at the Vienna State Opera. In 1956, he debuted at Covent Garden, as Count Almaviva in Mozart's The Marriage of Figaro, and at the Salzburg Festival, as Arbace in Mozart's Idomeneo; in 1958, at Bayreuth, as Amfortas in Wagner's Parsifal; in 1959, at the Paris Opera, as Wolfram in Wagner's Tannhäuser; in 1960, at both La Scala and the Lyric Opera of Chicago, as Count Almaviva; and, in January 1961, at the Metropolitan Opera, as Wolfram.

Awarded in 1963 the title Kammersänger, Waechter created in 1980 the role of Joseph in Gottfried von Einem's Jesu Hochzeit, opposite Karan Armstrong. Appropriately enough, given the fame of his 1959 recording in the title role of Mozart's Don Giovanni title role, Waechter appeared in 1969, depicted as Don Giovanni, on the set of postal stamps issued by Austria to commemorate the centenary of the Vienna State Opera.

In 1987 Waechter was appointed general manager of the Vienna Volksoper. Four years later he also became head of the Vienna State Opera, a position he held at the time of his death. He suffered a fatal heart attack while walking in the woods of Vienna.

== Work ==
External audio
- Eberhard Waechter as Count Danilo Danilovitsch in a recording of Franz Lehár's opera The Merry Widow, Lovro von Matačić conducting the Philharmonia Orchestra with Elisabeth Schwarzkopf and Nicolai Gedda in 1963

Waechter features in several opera recordings that enjoy classic status:

- As Faninal in Walter Legge's 1956 production of Der Rosenkavalier with the Philharmonia, conducted by Herbert von Karajan and starring Elisabeth Schwarzkopf, Christa Ludwig, Teresa Stich-Randall, Ljuba Welitsch, Otto Edelmann, and Nicolai Gedda (EMI 7243 5 67869 2 9 (3CD)
- As Donner in John Culshaw's 1958 production of Das Rheingold with the Vienna Philharmonic, conducted by Sir Georg Solti and starring Kirsten Flagstad, George London, and Gustav Neidlinger (Decca 028945555621)
- In the title role of Legge's 1959 production of Don Giovanni with the Philharmonia Orchestra and Chorus, conducted by Carlo Maria Giulini and starring Schwarzkopf, Joan Sutherland, Graziella Sciutti, Luigi Alva, Gottlob Frick, Giuseppe Taddei, and Piero Cappuccilli (EMI 7243 5 67869 2 9 (3CD)
- As the Count in Legge's production of Capriccio, conducted by Wolfgang Sawallisch and featuring Schwarzkopf, Christa Ludwig, Hans Hotter, Dietrich Fischer-Dieskau and Anna Moffo (EMI, 1959)
- As Count Almaviva in a 1959 Le nozze di Figaro conducted by Carlo Maria Giulini and featuring Schwarzkopf, Anna Moffo, Giuseppe Taddei, Fiorenza Cossotto and Ivo Vinco. (EMI 7 63266 2) (2 CD). For details, see Le Nozze di Figaro (Giulini 1959 recording).
- As the Speaker of the Temple in a live performance of The Magic Flute from the 1961 Salzburg Festival, conducted by Joseph Keilberth, with Fritz Wunderlich, Gottlob Frick, Walter Berry, Erika Köth, and Lisa Otto. (Golden Melodram, GM 5.00.44) (3 CD)
- As Frank in the 1960 "gala" production of Die Fledermaus with the Vienna Philharmonic conducted by Herbert von Karajan, featuring an all-star cast of guest singers performing hits from operetta, light opera and the Broadway stage. (Decca 4210462 – 2 CDs)
- As Eisenstein in several other recordings of Die Fledermaus, conducted by Carlos Kleiber, Karl Böhm, Oscar Danon, and Herbert von Karajan.
- As Kurwenal in Tristan und Isolde conducted at the Bayreuth Festival by Karl Böhm (Deutsche Grammophon, 1966), alongside Birgit Nilsson, Wolfgang Windgassen, Christa Ludwig and Martti Talvela
- As John the Baptist in Salome, conducted by Solti, with Birgit Nilsson and Gerhard Stolze (Decca Records, 1961)
- In the title role of Wozzeck, conducted by Christoph von Dohnányi, with Anja Silja as Marie (Decca Records, 1979)

On DVD, Waechter can be seen in a 1987 Die Fledermaus from Munich, opposite Pamela Coburn, Janet Perry and Brigitte Fassbaender, conducted by Carlos Kleiber and directed by Otto Schenk.

== Repertoire ==
- Claude Debussy
  - Golaud in Pelléas et Mélisande
- Gaetano Donizetti
  - Il dottore Dulcamara in L'elisir d'amore
- Gottfried von Einem
  - Danton in Dantons Tod
  - Alfred Ill in Der Besuch der alten Dame (Uraufführung)
- Charles Gounod
  - Valentin in Faust
- Franz Lehár
  - Count Danilo Danilovitch in Die lustige Witwe
  - Count René von Luxemburg in Der Graf von Luxemburg
- Ruggero Leoncavallo
  - Silvio in Der Bajazzo
- Albert Lortzing
  - The Tsar in Zar und Zimmermann
  - Count von Eberbach in Der Wildschütz
- Wolfgang Amadeus Mozart
  - Don Alfonso in Così fan tutte
  - Don Giovanni in Don Giovanni
  - Count Almaviva in Die Hochzeit des Figaro
  - Sprecher in Die Zauberflöte
- Jacques Offenbach
  - The 4 villains in Hoffmanns Erzählungen
  - Baron Gondremark in Pariser Leben
- Giacomo Puccini
  - Marcello in La Bohème
  - Gianni Schicchi in Gianni Schicchi
  - Scarpia in Tosca
  - Sharpless in Madama Butterfly
- Gioachino Rossini
  - Figaro and Don Bartolo in Der Barbier von Sevilla
- Johann Strauss II
  - Gabriel von Eisenstein in Die Fledermaus
  - Caramello and Pappacoda in Eine Nacht in Venedig
  - Count Homonay in Der Zigeunerbaron
- Richard Strauss
  - Jochanaan in Salome
  - Orest in Elektra
  - Faninal in Der Rosenkavalier
  - Mandryka in Arabella
  - Barak in Die Frau ohne Schatten
  - Count in Capriccio
- Giuseppe Verdi
  - Renato in Un ballo in maschera
  - Rigoletto in Rigoletto
  - Rodrigo di Posa in Don Carlo
  - Ford in Falstaff
  - Simon Boccanegra in Simon Boccanegra
- Richard Wagner
  - Amfortas in Parsifal
  - Wolfram in Tannhäuser
  - Kothner in Die Meistersinger von Nürnberg
  - Donner in Das Rheingold
- Carl Maria von Weber
  - Ottokar in Der Freischütz
