= Paul Kuën =

German opera singer

Paul Kuën (8 April 1910 – April 1997) was a German operatic tenor known for character roles. One example among many such portrayals would be Mime in Wagner's Der Ring des Nibelungen.

Kuën was born at Sulzberg, Oberallgäu. He had originally wanted to be an organ-builder, but then studied singing with Heinrich Knote and Adalbert Ebner in Munich. He made his stage debut at the State Theatre in Konstanz in 1933 and went on to sing in many European opera houses, including Munich State Opera from 1946, Bayreuth where he sang from 1951–1957, Salzburg, the Vienna State Opera, the Bavarian State Opera, and London's Royal Opera House. He made his debut at the New York Metropolitan Opera on 16 December 1961 as Mime in Das Rheingold. He also sang Mime in the Met's 1962 Siegfried and the multiple roles of Andrès, Cochenille, Pitichinaccio, and Frantz in the company's 1962 production of The Tales of Hoffmann.

A Kammersänger of the Federal Republic of Germany, Paul Kuën taught singing following his retirement from the operatic stage. Amongst his pupils was the noted lieder singer, Christian Gerhaher. In 1976, he published his autobiography, Allgäuer Lausbub erobert die Bühnen der Welt (A rascal from Allgäu conquers the stages of the world).

== Recordings ==
Kuën can be heard on many recordings of Wagner's operas, including performances conducted by Herbert von Karajan, Joseph Keilberth, Clemens Krauss, Hans Knappertsbusch, and Sir Georg Solti. He also appears on recordings of several rarely performed German operas such as Goetz's Der Widerspenstigen Zähmung, Lortzing's Die beiden Schützen, Nicolai's Die lustigen Weiber von Windsor, and Orff's Der Mond, Die Kluge and Antigonae.
