= Peter Klein (tenor) =

German opera singer

Peter Klein (January 25, 1907 – October 3, 1992) was a German lyric and light-operatic tenor. He was born in Zündorf (near Cologne), and died in Vienna. He achieved the prestigious rank of Kammersänger. Beginning in 1942, he sang at the Vienna State Opera, and performed in several Salzburg Festivals. He made his debut at New York's Metropolitan Opera on 21 November 1949 as Valzacchi in Der Rosenkavalier and sang there for three seasons in roles including Don Basilio in Le nozze di Figaro, Mime in Siegfried, and Jaquino in Fidelio. In 1956, he was hired as professor at the Konservatorium der Stadt Wien.

He left recordings including Monostatos, Pedrillo, Mime, and the Dance-Master.

== Sources ==
- Encyclopedia of Austria (Österreich-Lexikons), "Klein, Peter"
- Metropolitan Opera, Klein, Peter (Tenor), performance record on the MetOpera Database
