= Helmut Pampuch =

German opera singer

Helmut Pampuch (30 January 1940 – 20 March 2008) was a German opera singer.

Pampuch, a native of Upper Silesia, was a member, from 1973 to 2005, of the Deutsche Oper am Rhein in Düsseldorf, where he sang numerous parts of the tenor buffo repertoire, for instance Dr. Blind in Die Fledermaus. His most famous role was that of Mime in Patrice Chéreau's production of Richard Wagner's Der Ring des Nibelungen 1976 at the Bayreuth Festival.

He died in 2008, aged 68, after long illness.
