= Gerhard Stolze =

German operatic tenor (1926-1979)

- Born: 1 October 1926; Dessau
- Died: 11 March 1979 (aged 52)
- Burial place: Garmisch-Partenkirchen
- Citizenship: German
- Occupation: operatic tenor

Gerhard Stolze (1 October 1926, Dessau – 11 March 1979, Garmisch-Partenkirchen) was a German operatic tenor.

He was a character tenor best known as a Wagner singer. His signature role was Mime (Das Rheingold, Siegfried). Other important roles were David (Die Meistersinger von Nürnberg), Loge (Das Rheingold), Aegisth (Elektra) and Herod (Salome). He also sang the Captain in Wozzeck and, the roles of Oberon (A Midsummer Night's Dream) and the Emperor Nero, both of which were originally written for countertenor. He recorded Mozart's high-tenor Singspiel roles, Monostatos and Pedrillo.

He portrays Mime on both the studio recordings of Siegfried by Herbert von Karajan and Georg Solti.

His voice was very high, thin, and piercing, and capable of an extraordinary range of colors. His style sharply divided critics and audiences, especially in the roles of Mime and Herod. It was denigrated as being over-neurotic, glorified sprechstimme by some, while others praised it for its deep characterization and astonishing virtuosity.

He made his debut in 1949 at the State Opera in Dresden as Moser, one of the Mastersingers in Die Meistersinger von Nürnberg, the same role in which he made his first appearance at the Bayreuth Festival in 1951. He was a member of the Berlin State Opera from 1953–1961. Other house debuts include the Vienna State Opera in 1957, the Covent Garden in 1960 (as Mime in a complete Ring under Solti), and the Metropolitan Opera in 1968 as Loge. He sang in the first performances or first stagings of Werner Egk's Der Revisor, Heimo Erbse's Julietta, Carl Orff's Oedipus der Tyrann, Frank Martin's Le mystère de la Nativité, and Giselher Klebe's Jacobowsky und der Oberst.

== Discography ==
- 1951 - Die Meistersinger von Nürnberg (Wagner), conducted by Herbert von Karajan (Role: Moser)
- 1951 - Die Meistersinger von Nürnberg (Wagner), conducted by Rudolf Kempe (Role: Moser)
- 1951 - Parsifal (Wagner), conducted by Hans Knappertsbusch (Role: Knappe 4)
- 1952 - Die Meistersinger von Nürnberg (Wagner), conducted by Hans Knappertsbusch (Role: Moser)
- 1952 - Tristan und Isolde (Wagner), conducted by Herbert von Karajan (Role: Hirte)
- 1952 - Parsifal (Wagner), conducted by Hans Knappertsbusch (Role: Knappe 3)
- 1953 - Parsifal (Wagner), conducted by Clemens Krauss (Role: Knappe)
- 1953 - Tristan und Isolde (Wagner), conducted by Eugen Jochum (Role: Hirte)
- 1953 - Das Rheingold (Wagner), conducted by Clemens Krauss (Role: Froh)
- 1953 - Das Rheingold (Wagner), conducted by Joseph Keilberth (Role: Froh)
- 1953 - Lohengrin (Wagner), conducted by Joseph Keilberth (Role: ein Edler)
- 1954 - Lohengrin (Wagner), conducted by Eugen Jochum (Role: ein Edler)
- 1954 - Parsifal (Wagner), conducted by Hans Knappertsbusch (Role: Knappe)
- 1954 - Otello (Verdi), conducted by Herbert Kegel (Role: Cassio)
- 1954 - Tannhäuser (Wagner), conducted by Joseph Keilberth (Role: Heinrich)
- 1955 - Tannhäuser (Wagner), conducted by André Cluytens (Role: Heinrich)
- 1956 - Die Meistersinger von Nürnberg (Wagner), conducted by André Cluytens (Role: David)
- 1956 - Parsifal (Wagner), conducted by Hans Knappertsbusch (Role: Knappe 3)
- 1956 - Luisa Miller (Verdi), conducted by Herbert Kegel (Role: Rodolfo)
- 1957 - Die Meistersinger von Nürnberg (Wagner), conducted by André Cluytens (Role: David)
- 1958 - Lohengrin (opera), conducted by André Cluytens (Role: ein Edler)
- 1958 - Parsifal (Wagner), conducted by Hans Knappertsbusch (Role: Knappe)
- 1958 - Das Rheingold (Wagner), conducted by Hans Knappertsbusch (Role: Mime)
- 1958 - Siegfried (Wagner), conducted by Hans Knappertsbusch (Role: Mime)
- 1959 - Die Meistersinger von Nürnberg (Wagner), conducted by Erich Leinsdorf (Role: David)
- 1960 - Die Meistersinger von Nürnberg (Wagner), conducted by Hans Knappertsbusch (Role: David)
- 1960 - Die Fledermaus (Johann Strauss), conducted by Herbert von Karajan (Role: Orlofsky)
- 1960 - Das Rheingold (Wagner), conducted by Rudolf Kempe (Role: Loge)
- 1960 - Tristan und Isolde (Wagner), conducted by Karl Böhm (Role: Hirte)
- 1961 - Parsifal (Wagner), conducted by Hans Knappertsbusch (Role: Knappe 4)
- 1961 - Antigonae (Orff), conducted by Ferdinand Leitner (Role: ein Wächter)
- 1961 - Tannhäuser (Wagner), conducted by Wolfgang Sawallisch (Role: Walter)
- 1962 - Tannhäuser (Wagner), conducted by Wolfgang Sawallisch (Role: Walter)
- 1962 - Parsifal (Wagner), conducted by Hans Knappertsbusch (Role: Knappe)
- 1962 - Lohengrin (opera), conducted by Wolfgang Sawallisch (Role: ein Edler)
- 1962 - Tristan und Isolde (Wagner), conducted by Karl Böhm (Role: Hirte)
- 1962 - Siegfried (Wagner), conducted by Georg Solti (Role: Mime)
- 1963 - L'incoronazione di Poppea (Monteverdi), conducted by Herbert von Karajan (Role: Nerone)
- 1965 - Wozzeck (Berg), conducted by Karl Böhm (Role: Captain)
- 1965 - Salome (Richard Strauss), conducted by Georg Solti (Role: Herodes)
- 1966 - Falstaff (Verdi), conducted by Leonard Bernstein (Role: Dr. Caius)
- 1966 - Boris Godunov (Mussorgsky), conducted by Herbert von Karajan (Role: Shuiski, The Simpleton)
- 1966 - Oedipus der Tyrann (Orff), conducted by Rafael Kubelík (Role: Oedipus)
- 1966 - Messe solennelle de Sainte Cécile (Gounod), conducted by Igor Markevitch (Tenor)
- 1967 - Das Rheingold (Wagner), conducted by Herbert von Karajan (Role: Loge)
- 1967 - Elektra (R. Strauss), conducted by Georg Solti (Role: Aegisth)
- 1968 - Siegfried (Wagner), conducted by Herbert von Karajan (Role: Mime)
- 1968 - Carmina Burana (Orff), conducted by Eugen Jochum (Tenor)
- 1969 - Die Zauberflöte (Mozart), conducted by Georg Solti (Role: Monostatos)
- 1973 - Das Rheingold (Wagner), conducted by Herbert von Karajan (Role: Mime)
- 1976 - Tristan und Isolde (Wagner), conducted by Horst Stein (Role: Hirte)

== External sources ==
- Wagnerian Tenors and Heldentenors
- Entry in Oxford Dictionary of Music via Oxford Music Online.
- As Loge on YouTube (audio only)
- As Nero in THE CORONATION OF POPPEA, with Carlo Cava, on YouTube (audio only)
- As Monostatos on YouTube (audio only)
