= Hermann Winkler (tenor) =

German operatic tenor

Hermann Winkler (3 March 1924 – 21 January 2009) was a German operatic tenor.

== Life ==
Born in Duisburg, Winkler studied at the Musikhochschule Hannover and began his singing career at the Staatsoper Hannover. The following engagements took him to Bielefeld (1954–1958), Zurich and Cologne, where he was a permanent ensemble member between 1959 and 1986. In Cologne, he sang in the Mozart cycle of the director Jean-Pierre Ponnelle as well as the Kaiser in his production of the Die Frau ohne Schatten by Richard Strauss. This production could also be seen at the Milanese La Scala. Parallel to his Cologne engagements, Winkler had a guest contract at the Oper Frankfurt, where he appeared as Ritter the knight in Barbe-bleue in Offenbach's operetta of the same name directed by Walter Felsenstein, among others. In Frankfurt, he made his debut as Florestan in Beethoven's Fidelio with Hildegard Behrens under the direction of Christoph von Dohnanyi.

In 1964, he sang Tannhäuser for the first time at the Bayreuth Festival. There he appeared in Der fliegende Holländer (Steuermann) and in 1976/1977 as Parsifal, which he also sang at the Salzburg Easter Festival under Herbert von Karajan's conduct. At the Salzburg Summer Festival, he sang Don Ottavio in Mozart's Don Giovanni. Under the direction of Herbert von Karajan, he sang in Berlin and Tokyo in Beethoven's 9th Symphony and Mahler's Lied von der Erde.

In 1975 he took part in the film The Flying Dutchman (Erik). His partners were Catarina Ligendza and Donald McIntyre. It was conducted by Wolfgang Sawallisch.

Winkler's repertoire ranged from the lyrical Mozart parts to Wagner (title roles in Lohengrin and Parsifal), Beethoven (Florestan in Fidelio), Weber (Max in Der Freischütz) and Richard Strauss (Kaiser in Die Frau ohne Schatten, Bacchus in Ariadne auf Naxos). At the end of his career, he changed to the character subjects.

In 1989, he made his debut at the Zürich Opera House in the title role of Britten's Peter Grimes, and in 1991 at the Lower Saxony State Theatre in Hannover in the title role of Pfitzner's Palestrina.

Guest engagements took him to Hamburg, Berlin, Munich, Vienna, Buenos Aires, Tokyo, Chicago, Milan, Rome, Paris, Brussels, Amsterdam, London, Geneva.

From 1988 onwards, he directed the opera studio in Hamburg for several years.

Winkler died in Gauting at the age of 84 after a short, serious illness. He was buried at the Ostfriedhof (Munich).
