= Michaela Schuster =

German operatic mezzo-soprano

Michaela Schuster is a German operatic mezzo-soprano. She debuted at The Royal Opera as Herodias in Salome in 2008, and has since sung Princesse de Bouillon in Adriana Lecouvreur, and Venus in Tannhäuser. In the 2013/14 season, she sang Klytämnestra in Elektra and the Nurse in Die Frau ohne Schatten. In Gran Teatre del Liceu, 2016, she performed the role of Waltraute in Götterdämmerung.
