= Bayreuth Festival Orchestra =

The Bayreuth Festival Orchestra is a seasonal German orchestra based at the Bayreuth Festspielhaus for the annual summer festival Bayreuth Festival. It is reconstituted each season in order to perform Richard Wagner's Der Ring des Nibelungen and other of his stage works, as envisaged by the composer and festival founder. The festival occurs annually, although in some years it was cancelled because of war or other reasons.

Although otherwise entirely devoted to the works of Wagner, the inaugural festival in 1876 was opened with a performance of Beethoven's Choral Symphony, and this practice has often been followed subsequently. It has become something of a tradition since Wilhelm Furtwängler reintroduced it in the 1930s.

The Bayreuth Festival Orchestra does not have a permanent membership but each year the festival organisers recruit leading musicians from other German orchestras, depending on their availability. Some musicians always arrange their schedules so as to be available for the orchestra; others participate less frequently.

== Conductors ==
Conductors of the Bayreuth Festival Orchestra at the Bayreuth Festival have been:

- Hans Richter: 1876, 1896–97, 1901–02, 1904, 1906, 1908
- Hermann Levi: 1882 (premiere of Parsifal) et al.
- Felix Mottl: 1896
- Siegfried Wagner: 1896–97, 1899, 1901–02, 1906, 1928
- Franz Beidler: 1904 (Cosima Wagner's son-in-law)
- Michael Balling: 1909, 1911–12, 1914, 1924–25
- Franz von Hoesslin: 1927–28, 1940
- Karl Elmendorff: 1930–31, 1933–34, 1942
- Heinz Tietjen: 1934, 1936, 1938–39, 1941
- Wilhelm Furtwängler: 1936-37
- Hans Knappertsbusch: 1951, 1956–58
- Herbert von Karajan: 1951
- Joseph Keilberth: 1952-56
- Clemens Krauss: 1953
- Rudolf Kempe: 1960-63
- Berislav Klobučar: 1964
- Karl Böhm: 1965-67
- Otmar Suitner: 1966-67
- Lorin Maazel: 1968-69
- Horst Stein: 1970-75
- Pierre Boulez: 1976-80 (the centenary production Jahrhundertring)
- Georg Solti: 1983
- Peter Schneider: 1984-86
- Daniel Barenboim: 1988-92
- James Levine: 1994-98
- Giuseppe Sinopoli: 2000
- Ádám Fischer: 2001-04
- Christian Thielemann: 2006-10, 2026
- Kirill Petrenko: 2013-15
- Marek Janowski: 2016-17
- Plácido Domingo: 2018 (3 performances of Die Walküre only)
- Cornelius Meister: 2022
- Pietari Inkinen: 2023
- Simone Young: 2024-25

A number of other notable conductors have conducted the orchestra for recordings and broadcasts.
