= Viktoria Yastrebova =

Russian operatic soprano

Viktoria Yastrebova (Russian: Виктория Ястребова, also known as Victoria Yastrebova) is a Russian operatic soprano. She is currently a principal of the Mariinsky Theatre in Saint Petersburg, Russia.

Born in Rostov on Don, Russia, Yastrebova graduated from the music faculty of the Taganrog Pedagogical Institute and later, in 2000, from the Rostov State Rakhmaninov Conservatoire under Khudoverdova. In 2002 she joined the Mariinsky Academy of Young Singers, and in 2008 became soloist of the Mariinsky Theatre. Yastrebova is Honoured Artist of the Republic of Northern Osetia-Alania, Russia, prize-winner at the International Moniuszko Vocalists' Competition in 2004, and the prize-winner at the VI International Rimsky-Korsakov Young Opera Singers' Competition in 2004.

In 2009 Yastrebova made her debut at Royal Opera House in London as Oksana in Tchaikovsky's opera Cherevichki (The Tsarina's Slippers). She frequently performs in operas and concerts in countries including Russia, the United Kingdom, the United States, Germany, Finland, Spain, Austria, Switzerland, Israel, Japan, France, Italy and Netherlands. She has performed at international venues and opera festivals including Carnegie Hall, John F. Kennedy Center, Festspielhaus Baden-Baden, Bayerische Staatsoper, Savonlinna Festival and Barbican Hall. On the concert platform, Yastrebova has frequently performed Verdi's Requiem and Beethoven's Ninth Symphony under Valery Gergiev and Adrian Leaper. She has also recorded Mahler's Eighth Symphony with Valery Gergiev. 2011 saw her debut at La Scala.

The Times wrote of her, following her performance in London of Rimsky-Korsakov's Tsar Saltan in 2008, "The best of the young bunch was Viktoria Yastrebova, whose dark, rich and powerful soprano made one wonder if the phrase “the next Anna Netrebko” might finally be justly deployed."

Donna Anna in Don Giovanni, Micaëla in Carmen, the title role of Tosca, Cio-Cio-San in Madama Butterfly, Tatiana in Eugene Onegin, Violetta in La Traviata, Desdemona in Otello, both Mimi and Musetta in La bohème, Elettra in Idomeneo, the title role of Iolanta, Maria in Mazepa, Corinna in Il viaggio a Reims, Amelia in Simon Boccanegra, Elisabeth de Valois in Don Carlo, Nedda in I pagliacci, Freia in Das Rheingold are amongst her operatic repertoire.
