= Karl Laufkötter =

German opera singer

Karl Laufkötter (18 May 1899 in Düsseldorf, Germany – 14 December 1993), was a German operatic tenor who specialised in character-tenor roles.

In the 1930s and 40s he was engaged by the Metropolitan Opera as one of their leading tenors, famously performing Mime in Siegfried (opera) alongside Lauritz Melchior. Other roles sung during his time at the company include: Vashek in The Bartered Bride, Narraboth in Salome (opera), Walther in Tannhauser (opera), Valzacchi in Der Rosenkavalier, Monostatos in The Magic Flute, and Jacquino in Fidelio.
