= Erwin Wohlfahrt =

German opera singer (1932–1968)

Erwin Wohlfahrt (13 January 1932 – 28 November 1968) was a German operatic tenor, best known for the non-heroic roles for tenor in Wagner operas, such as Mime the dwarf and David the shoemaker's apprentice.

Wohlfahrt studied at the Music Academy in his native Nuremberg. He sang numerous character-tenor roles in Wagner operas at Bayreuth from 1963 through 1967, including the very demanding role of Mime the evil dwarf. Several of his performances are available on CD, including Mime, David, Pedrillo, the Hirt in Tristan und Isolde, and the Painter in Lulu. He sings Mime on the recorded 1967 performance of the Ring Cycle from Bayreuth conducted by Karl Böhm, which has been available since the vinyl days.

Like his fellow German tenor Fritz Wunderlich, Wohlfahrt died in his mid-thirties. The two vocalists can be heard together in a recorded performance of Die Entführung aus dem Serail from Salzburg 1961. Wohlfahrt died in Hamburg, and was buried at the Ohlsdorf Cemetery there.
