= Gustav Neidlinger =

German opera singer (1910–1991)

Gustav Neidlinger (21 March 1910 – 26 December 1991) was a German bass-baritone, known as a performer of Wagner's villains, especially Alberich and Klingsor, from the early 1950s to the early 1970s. Born in Mainz, Neidlinger studied at the Frankfurt conservatory, where he was trained by Otto Rottsieper. He debuted in 1931 at the Stadttheater in Mainz, where he sang until 1934. In 1934 and 1935, he performed at the Stadttheater in Plauen, Sachsen. From 1935 to 1950, he was a member of the Hamburg opera, where In 1937 he took part in the world premiere of the opera Schwarzer Peter by Norbert Schultze. In 1950, he joined the Stuttgart Staatsoper, where he became very popular and was, in 1977, named an honorary member. In Stuttgart, he sang in Igor Stravinsky's The Rake's Progress. In 1956 he moved to the Vienna Staatsoper, where he had sung as early as 1941. He also sang at the Paris Opéra (1953–67) and at Covent Garden in London in tandem with the Stuttgart ensemble (1955, 1963 (Telramund), and 1965 (Alberich)). He was honored with the title German Kammersänger in 1952.

Neidlinger's portrayal of the villainous Alberich in Der Ring des Nibelungen was recorded in Georg Solti's Decca studio recording (1958–1965), and Karl Böhm's 1967 performance taped live at the Bayreuth Festival. He sang at Bayreuth from 1952 to 1975, mainly Alberich, but also Klingsor in Parsifal, Kurwenal in Tristan und Isolde, Fritz Kothner in Die Meistersinger von Nürnberg, and occasionally Hans Sachs and Friedrich von Telramund. He sang Alberich at New York's Metropolitan Opera in 1972. In addition to his performances in Wagner he was also seen in buffo roles. He died in Bad Ems.

== Partial discography ==
- Bass solos in Johann Sebastian Bach: Mass in B Minor. Vienna 1959, Dir.: Hermann Scherchen (Deutsche Grammophon).
- Jules Massenet: Manon. 1950, Dir.: Wilhelm Schüchter (Myto).
- van Bett in Albert Lortzing: Zar und Zimmermann. Stuttgart 1952, Dir.: Ferdinand Leitner (Deutsche Grammophon).
- Ollendorf in Karl Millöcker: Der Bettelstudent, Dir.: Werner Schmidt-Bölcke.
- Wolfgang Amadeus Mozart: The Marriage of Figaro. Sung in German translation. Vienna, Dir.: Clemens Krauss (Preiser). He plays Doctor Bartolo.
- W.A. Mozart: Don Giovanni. NDR Hamburg 1951, Dir.: Leopold Ludwig (Urania). He plays Masetto.
- Strolch in Carl Orff: Die Kluge. London 1956, Dir.: Wolfgang Sawallisch (EMI).
- Richard Strauss: Daphne. NDR, Dir.: Arthur Grüber (Myto).
- Colonna in Richard Wagner: Rienzi. Stuttgart 1957, Dir.: Lovro von Matačić (Living Stage).
- Telramund in Richard Wagner: Lohengrin. La Scala 1965, Dir.: Wolfgang Sawallisch (Living Stage).
- Kurwenal in Richard Wagner: Tristan and Isolde. Bayreuth 1953, Dir.: Eugen Jochum (Melodram).
- Kurwenal, Holland Festival The Hague 1959, Dir.: Ferdinand Leitner (Myto).
- Kurwenal, Bayreuth 1964, Dir.: Karl Böhm. (Operadepot-dot-com)
- Kurwenal, Staatsoper Stuttgart 1973, Dir.: Carlos Kleiber (Living Stage).
- The Night-Watchman (a comprimario role) in Die Meistersinger von Nürnberg. Bayreuth 1952, Dir.: Knappertsbusch (Melodram).
- Fritz Kothner in Richard Wagner: Die Meistersinger von Nürnberg 1956, Dir.: Rudolf Kempe (EMI).
- Hans Sachs in Die Meistersinger von Nürnberg. Bayreuth 1957, Dir.: Clutyens (Walhall).
- Hans Sachs in Die Meistersinger von Nürnberg. Buenos Aires 1968, Dir.: Ferdinand Leitner (Living Stage).
- Alberich, Das Rheingold, 1952, Dir.: Wilhelm Schüchter (Gebhardt Records).
- Alberich, Das Rheingold. RAI 1953, Dir.: Wilhelm Furtwängler (EMI).
- Alberich, Der Ring des Nibelungen. Bayreuth 1953, Dir.: Clemens Krauss (Gala)
- Alberich, Der Ring des Nibelungen. Bayreuth 1953, Dir.: Joseph Keilberth (Andromeda)
- Alberich, Der Ring des Nibelungen. Bayreuth 1955, Joseph Keilberth (Testament)
- Alberich, Der Ring des Nibelungen. Bayreuth 1965 Dir.: Karl Böhm (operadepot.com).
- Alberich, Der Ring des Nibelungen. Bayreuth 1967 Dir.: Karl Böhm (Philips).
- Alberich, Der Ring des Nibelungen. Vienna 1958/1962/1964. Dir.: Georg Solti (The famous Decca studio recording).
- Alberich, Der Ring des Nibelungen, Bayreuth 1968. Dir.: Lorin Maazel (operadepot.com).
- Alberich, Der Ring des Nibelungen, Bayreuth 1969. Dir.: Lorin Maazel (operadepot.com).
- Alberich, Der Ring des Nibelungen, Bayreuth 1970. Dir.: Horst Stein (operadepot.com).
- Alberich, Der Ring des Nibelungen, Bayreuth 1971. Dir.: Horst Stein (operadepot.com).
- Alberich, Der Ring des Nibelungen, Bayreuth 1973. Dir.: Horst Stein (operadepot.com).
- Alberich, Der Ring des Nibelungen, Bayreuth 1975. Dir.: Horst Stein (operadepot.com).
- Klingsor, Parsifal. Bayreuth 1954. Dir.: Hans Knappertsbusch (Melodram).
- Klingsor, Parsifal. Bayreuth 1956. Dir.: Hans Knappertsbusch (Melodram).
- Klingsor, Parsifal. Bayreuth 1960. Dir.: Hans Knappertsbusch (Melodram).
- Klingsor, Parsifal. Bayreuth 1961. Dir.: Hans Knappertsbusch (Melodram).
- Klingsor, Parsifal. Bayreuth 1962. Dir.: Hans Knappertsbusch (Melodram).
- Klingsor, Parsifal. Bayreuth 1963. Dir.: Hans Knappertsbusch (Melodram).
- Klingsor, Parsifal. Bayreuth 1964. Dir.: Hans Knappertsbusch (Melodram).
- Klingsor, Parsifal. Bayreuth 1965. Dir.: Pierre Boulez. (operadepot.com).
- Klingsor, Parsifal. Bayreuth 1965. Dir.: Andre Cluytens. With Astrid Varnay. (operadepot.com).
- Klingsor, Parsifal. Bayreuth 1966. Dir.: Pierre Boulez. (Melodram).
- Amfortas in Parsifal. Grand Opera, Paris. March 26, 1954. Dir: Ferdinand Leitner. (Profil).
- Amfortas in Parsifal. La Scala, Milan. May 2, 1960. Dir: Andre Cluytens. (Melodram).
- Debussy - Pelléas et Mélisande, sung in German. (Wissmann, Windgassen, Welitsch, Hagner Rec. 1948 (Stuttgart, broadcast) Dir. Wetzelsberger (Walhall Eternity)
- Beethoven - Don Pizarro in Fidelio (King, Jones, Greindl) Berlin 1970 Dir: Böhm (Deutsche Grammophone DVD)
- Beethoven - Don Pizarro in Fidelio (Jurinac, Peerce, Ernster) Baveria 1961 Dir: Knappertsbusch (Theorama Records)
- Franz von Suppé - Boccaccio (Glawitsch, Streich, Fiedler) recorded Oct-1949 & bonus Dec-1949 Dir. Schuchter and Marszalek (Membran)
- Carl Maria von Weber - Euryanthe (Eipperle, Windgassen, Kinasiewicz) recorded 8-Jan-1954 Dir. Leitner (Walhall Eternity)
- Mussorgsky - Father Varlaam in Boris Godunov, sung in German by Welitsch, Hann, Moedl, Schock, Rothenberger, conducted by Wilhelm Schüchter in Hamburg, 1950 (Walhall)
- Gustav Neidlinger: Dokumente einer Sangerkarriere, an anthology of excerpts from Preiser Records
- Can be seen on film/DVD in rehearsal as Alberich, also performing in the Choral Symphony under Klemperer.
