= Horst Stein =

German conductor

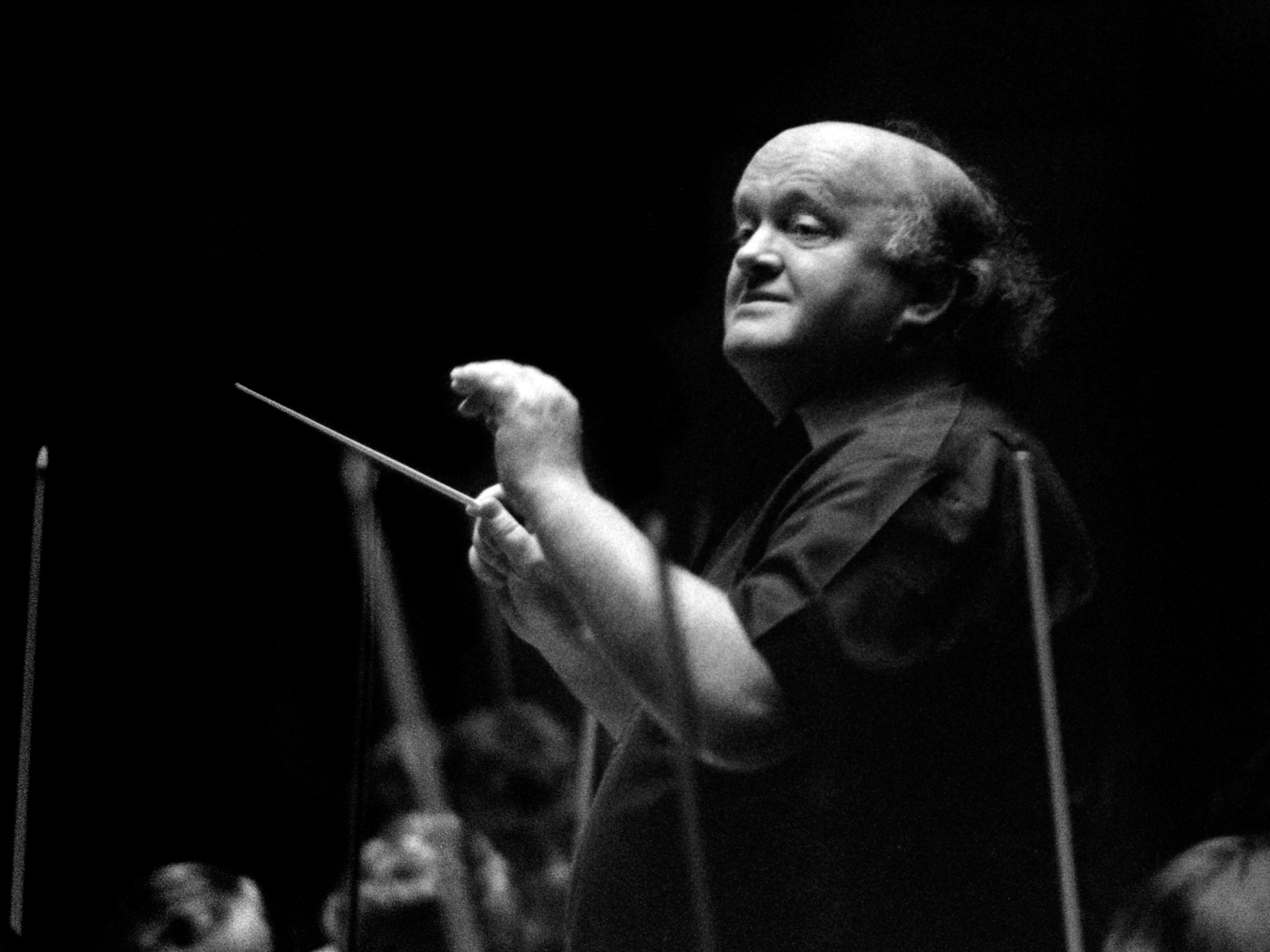
Horst Stein

Horst Walter Stein (2 May 1928 – 27 July 2008) was a German conductor.

== Biography ==
Stein was born in Elberfeld, Germany; his father was a mechanic. At school in Frankfurt, he studied piano, oboe, and singing. Later, he continued studies at the university in Cologne, including lessons in composition with Busoni's disciple Philipp Jarnach. From 1947 to 1951, he was a répétiteur at Wuppertal Opera.

In 1955, at the invitation of Erich Kleiber Stein conducted at the opening of the restored Berlin State Opera (Unter den Linden), and subsequently worked there as a Staatskapellmeister. From 1961 to 1963, he worked under the leadership of Rolf Liebermann as deputy chief conductor at the Hamburg State Opera. From 1963 to 1970, Stein was chief conductor and director of opera at the Mannheim National Theatre. Stein held a regular post at the Vienna State Opera from 1969 to 1971, where he conducted 500 performances. He returned to the Hamburg State Opera as general music director from 1972 to 1977.

In 1952, Stein began work as a conducting assistant at the Bayreuth Festival to such conductors as Joseph Keilberth, Hans Knappertsbusch, Clemens Krauss and Herbert von Karajan. One source estimates that he subsequently conducted 76 performances there from 1969 to 1986, including the 1983 Bayreuth centenary production of Die Meistersinger von Nürnberg, but this figure is clearly mistaken since Stein had already led 81 in his first seven seasons. More plausibly, Gramophone magazine gives the remarkable total of 138 performances, a number that jibes with the Festspielhaus database.

He held principal conducting positions with the Bamberg Symphony, l'Orchestre de la Suisse Romande in Geneva, the Basel Symphony Orchestra and the NHK Symphony Orchestra Tokyo. He was especially associated with the music of Max Reger and recorded several Reger works, besides many works of the German Romantic period (the Second and Sixth symphonies of Bruckner with the Vienna Philharmonic, as well as several works by Sibelius, all for Decca).

He spent much time training young conductors.

== Honours and awards ==
- Anton-Bruckner-Ring (Vienna Symphony, 1996)
- Honorary member of the National Theatre Mannheim, the Friends of the Vienna State Opera and the Richard Wagner Society Linz
- Austrian Decoration for Science and Art (1995)
- Bavarian Maximilian Order for Science and Art (2003)

He died in Vandœuvres, Switzerland.

Preceded by Witold Rowicki	Principal conductor, Bamberg Symphony; 1985–1996	Succeeded by Jonathan Nott
