= Fritz Hübner =

German opera singer

Fritz Hübner (25 April 1933 – 16 June 2000) was a German operatic bass. Active from the late 1950s through the 1980s, he was particularly known for his performances in operas by Richard Wagner.

He was born in Sachsengrün, Sudetenland (Zakšov in the Doupov Mountains of the former Czechoslovakia), and studied at the Dessau Conservatory before making his opera debut as Sparafucile in Rigoletto at the Bernburg Landestheater in 1957. He sang the roles of Fafner and Hagen in Der Ring des Nibelungen at the Bayreuth Festival (1976–1980), performing in the "Hundredth Anniversary Ring" conducted by Pierre Boulez and recorded for Philips Records.

Hübner sang in the world premieres of Siegfried Matthus's Der letzte Schuss (The Last Shot) 1966, Ernst Hermann Meyer's Reiter in der Nacht (Rider in the Night) 1973, and Rainer Kunad's Sabellicus 1974. Although he performed primarily in German opera houses, he sang at New York's Metropolitan Opera as Hermann in seven performances of Tannhäuser during the 1982-1983 season.

Hübner died aged 67 in Berlin.

== Recordings ==
- Götterdämmerung – Orchestra and Chorus of the Bayreuth Festival; Pierre Boulez, conductor (1979) Label: Philips Records
- Siegfried – Orchestra and Chorus of the Bayreuth Festival; Pierre Boulez, conductor (1980) Label: Philips Records
- Das Rheingold – Orchestra and Chorus of the Bayreuth Festival; Pierre Boulez, conductor (1980) Label: Philips Records
