= Zoltán Kelemen (baritone) =

Hungarian bass-baritone (1926–1979)

Zoltán Kelemen (March 12, 1926 – May 9, 1979) was a Hungarian bass-baritone. He was born in Budapest and died in Zurich. He began studying music at the Franz Liszt Academy of Music before leaving Hungary in order to study in Rome. When he left Rome in 1959, he established himself in Germany, first in Augsburg and later in Cologne.

In the late 1960s and early 1970s, Kelemen was a favorite singer of Herbert von Karajan, with whom he recorded Fidelio in the role of Don Pizarro, Der Ring des Nibelungen as Alberich, Boris Godunov as Rangoni, Die Meistersinger von Nürnberg as Fritz Kothner, The Merry Widow as Mirko Zeta, and others. Kelemen also recorded the role of Klingsor in Parsifal with Georg Solti (1971). At the Bayreuth Festival, Kelemen succeeded Gustav Neidlinger in the role of Alberich, in which he debuted in 1964 and with which he became identified. He sang it several times under the direction of Pierre Boulez, as well as at Covent Garden in 1976 with Sir Colin Davis conducting.

Like Neidlinger, who had long enjoyed universal acclaim for his portrayals of Alberich, Kelemen came to be identified by critics with this role more than with any other; one reviewer called his portrayal "as ever, a nasty little thing." But Kelemen had a substantial non-Wagnerian repertoire as well, although (except for the Karajan productions mentioned above) not much of it was captured for posterity in studio recordings. He can be seen on DVD as Bartolo in Le nozze di Figaro, opposite Walter Berry as Figaro and Claire Watson as the Countess, conducted by Karl Böhm.
