= Rudolf Kempe =

German conductor

Rudolf Kempe (photo with dedication)

Rudolf Kempe (14 June 1910 – 12 May 1976) was a German conductor.

== Biography ==
Kempe was born in Dresden, where from the age of fourteen he studied at the Dresden State Opera School. He played oboe in the opera orchestra of Dortmund and then in the Leipzig Gewandhaus orchestra, from 1929. In addition to oboe, he played the piano regularly, as a soloist, in chamber music or accompanying, as a result of which, in 1933, the new director of the Leipzig Opera invited Kempe to become a répétiteur, and later a conductor, for the opera.

During the Second World War Kempe was conscripted into the army, but instead of active service was directed into musical activities, playing for the troops and later taking over the chief conductorship of the Chemnitz opera house.

== Career ==
=== Opera ===
Kempe directed the Dresden Opera and the Staatskapelle Dresden from 1949 to 1952, making his first records, including Der Rosenkavalier, Die Meistersinger and Der Freischütz. 'He obtains some superlative playing from the Dresden orchestra,' commented The Record Guide. He maintained a relationship with the Dresden orchestra for the rest of his life, making some of his best-known records with them during the stereo era.

His international career began with engagements at the Vienna State Opera in the 1951 season, for which he conducted Die Zauberflöte, Simon Boccanegra, and Capriccio.

He was invited to succeed Georg Solti as chief conductor of the Bavarian State Opera in Munich from 1952 to 1954, and was permitted by the East German authorities to do so without severing his ties with Dresden. In 1953 Kempe appeared with the Munich company at the Royal Opera House in London, where the General Administrator, Sir David Webster, quickly decided that Kempe would be an ideal music director for Covent Garden. Kempe declined the appointment, and did not accept the top job at any opera house after leaving Munich in 1954. He nonetheless conducted frequently at Covent Garden and was immensely popular there, leading among other works, Salome, Elektra, Der Rosenkavalier, Der Ring des Nibelungen, Un Ballo in Maschera and Madama Butterfly, of which the critic Andrew Porter compared Kempe's operatic conducting favourably with that of Arturo Toscanini and Victor de Sabata. As a guest conductor, Kempe frequently revisited Munich conducting mostly the Italian repertory.

Kempe's début at the Bayreuth Festspielhaus was in 1960. The Ring cycle he conducted there in that year was notable for multiple casting, with the role of Wotan split between Hermann Uhde and Jerome Hines, and Brünnhilde between Astrid Varnay and Birgit Nilsson.

=== Orchestral ===
Kempe was associated with the Royal Philharmonic (RPO) from 1955. In 1960, he became its associate conductor, chosen by the orchestra's founder, Sir Thomas Beecham. In 1961 and 1962 he was principal conductor of the RPO, and from 1963 to 1975 its artistic director. A member of the RPO later said of Kempe, "He was a wonderful controller of the orchestra, and a very great accompanist ... Kempe was like someone driving a racing-car, following the piano round the bends." Kempe abolished Beecham's male-only rule, introducing women into the RPO: an orchestra without them, he said, "always reminds me of the army." The first was violinist Christa Ruppert. In 1970, the RPO named him conductor for Life, but in 1975, he resigned his post with the orchestra.

From 1965 to 1972 Kempe worked with Tonhalle-Orchester Zürich, and from 1967 to his death conducted the Munich Philharmonic, with whom he made international tours and recorded the first quadraphonic set of the Beethoven symphonies.

In the final months of his life, Kempe was the chief conductor of the BBC Symphony Orchestra. The opening concert of the Henry Wood Promenade Concerts on 16 July 1976, in which he was to have conducted his BBC forces in Beethoven's Missa solemnis, became a memorial concert for him following Kempe's death in Zürich, two months earlier, aged 65.

== Recordings ==
Among Kempe's acclaimed recordings are a near-complete set of the orchestral works of Richard Strauss, which have been called a "benchmark" that "prompted some critics to wonder whether he had been the most naturally gifted Straussian of them all"; Lohengrin, which similarly has been called a "reference" and "untouchable"; Die Meistersinger; Ariadne auf Naxos; Scheherazade; and the Glagolitic Mass.

Cultural offices
Preceded by Georg Solti	General Music Director, Bavarian State Opera; 1952–1954	Succeeded by Ferenc Fricsay
