= Joseph Keilberth =

German conductor (1908–1968)

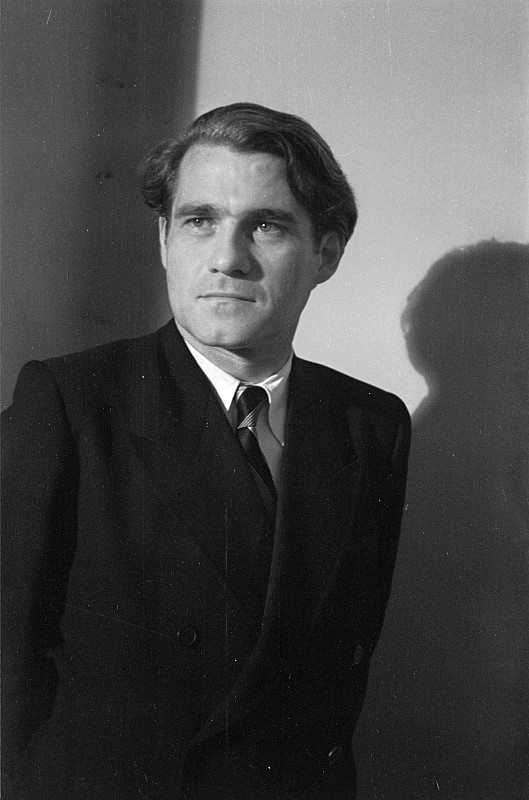
Keilberth photographed by Avraham Pisarek, 1945

Joseph Keilberth (19 April 1908 – 20 July 1968) was a German conductor who specialised in opera.

== Career ==
Keilberth began his career in the State Theatre of his native city, Karlsruhe, joining as a répétiteur in 1925 and conducting from 1935 to 1940. In 1940, he became director of the German Philharmonic Orchestra of Prague. In 1945, near the end of World War II, he was appointed principal conductor of the venerable Saxon State Opera Orchestra in Dresden. In 1949, he became chief conductor of the Bamberg Symphony, formed mainly of German musicians expelled from postwar Czechoslovakia under the Beneš decrees. Starting in 1950, Keilberth became a guest conductor at the Berlin State Opera, and was named chief conductor of the Hamburg Philharmonic Orchestra. Keilberth became a conductor of the Bavarian State Opera in 1951, and he succeeded Ferenc Fricsay as its artistic director in 1959.

== Ring Cycles at Bayreuth and in recording ==
Keilberth conducted at the Bayreuth Festival from 1952 until 1956, with complete Wagner Ring Cycles from 1952, 1953 and 1955, as well as a well-regarded recording of Die Walküre from 1954 (the whereabouts of rest of the cycle are unclear) in which Martha Mödl, perhaps the greatest Wagnerian actress and tragedian of her time, sang her only recorded Sieglinde. He made the first stereo recording of the Ring Cycle in 1955, as well as a so-called "second cycle" with Mödl, rather than Astrid Varnay, as Brünnhilde. Mödl's accounts of Brünnhilde, from the 1953 Ring as well as the 1955 "second cycle," are her only recordings of the role other than Wilhelm Furtwängler's 1953 Rome Ring and commercial Walküre in 1954.

== Other recordings ==
Among his other recordings, his outstanding interpretations of Wagner's Lohengrin at the 1953 Bayreuth Festival released on Decca-London and Weber's Der Freischütz made in 1958 for EMI, as well as a 'live' set of Richard Strauss's Arabella (featuring Lisa della Casa and Dietrich Fischer-Dieskau) made in 1963 for DG are still considered among the best versions. He conducted the TV-broadcast German-translation performance of Rossini's The Barber of Seville, featuring Fritz Wunderlich, Hermann Prey and Hans Hotter. His Haydn 85th Symphony and Brahms Fourth Symphony recordings on Telefunken are no less distinguished. Two modern operas are available on Deutsche Grammophon a 1963 live performance of Richard Straus's Die Frau ohne Schatten to mark the official re-opening of the National Theatre opera in Munich after its complete postwar restoration starring Ingrid Bjoner, Inge Borkh, Jess Thomas and Dietrich Fischer-Dieskau. Ariola-Eurodisc subsequently released a recording of the back to back performance of Wagner's Die Meistersinger from the same occasion. The other DG recording is the 1969 WDR radio broadcast with the Kölner Rundfunk-Sinfonie-Orchester of Cardillac by Paul Hindemith starring again Dietrich Fischer-Dieskau.

== Death ==
He died in Munich in 1968 after collapsing while conducting Wagner's opera Tristan und Isolde in exactly the same place as Felix Mottl was similarly fatally stricken in 1911. His final recording, a Meistersinger, came a month before his death—at the Bavarian State Opera on 21 June.

== Decorations and awards ==
- 1945 Title of Professor by the Saxon government
- 1949 National Prize of the German Democratic Republic, 1st class
- 1956 Commander's Cross of the Order of the Phoenix (Greece)
- 1961 Bavarian Order of Merit
- 1964 Austrian Cross of Honour for Science and Art, 1st class
- 1967 Culture Prize of Winterthur
- 1967 Honorary Conductor of the NHK Symphony Orchestra, Tokyo (as second conductor in the history of the orchestra)

Cultural offices
Preceded by Herbert von Karajan	Music Director, Berlin State Opera; 1948–1951	Succeeded by Erich Kleiber
Preceded by none	Principal Conductor, Bamberg Symphony Orchestra; 1949–1968	Succeeded by Eugen Jochum
