= Der Ring des Nibelungen (Georg Solti recording) =

1958–1965 Wagner opera recording

The Decca Ring
- 1997 CD release

Studio album by Georg Solti Vienna Philharmonic Orchestra Birgit Nilsson Hans Hotter Wolfgang Windgassen Gottlob Frick and 35 other soloists
- Released: 1959–1966
- Recorded: 1958–1965
- Studios: Sofiensaal, Vienna
- Label: Decca
- Producer: John Culshaw

Between 1958 and 1965 the Decca record company made the first complete recording to be released of Richard Wagner's operatic tetralogy, Der Ring des Nibelungen ("The Nibelung's Ring"), comprising Das Rheingold ("The Rhinegold"), Die Walküre ("The Valkyrie"), Siegfried and Götterdämmerung ("Twilight of the Gods"). Of the four component operas, there had been two previous studio recordings of Die Walküre, and a radio recording of Götterdämmerung that was released on record in 1956, but the Decca Ring was the first recording of the cycle planned and recorded for the gramophone.

The recording of The Ring was conceived and produced by Decca's senior producer, John Culshaw, who engaged the Vienna Philharmonic, the conductor Georg Solti and leading Wagner singers including Birgit Nilsson, Wolfgang Windgassen, Hans Hotter and Gottlob Frick and, in roles they did not play onstage, well-known singers such as Kirsten Flagstad, and Dietrich Fischer-Dieskau. Dame Joan Sutherland sang the Woodbird, a role she only sang occasionally at the start of her career. Culshaw and his engineering colleagues set out to capture on disc performances that would recreate in listeners' minds the drama that Wagner intended, compensating for the lack of visual images with imaginative production, making use of stereophonic techniques that became possible shortly before the start of the recording of the cycle.

The recordings were made in the Sofiensaal, Vienna, and issued on long-playing records. They were subsequently transferred to compact disc, in which form they have been continuously available since 1984. In polls for BBC Music and Gramophone magazines the Decca Ring has been voted the greatest recording ever made, and it has won numerous honours, including Grand Prix du Disque and Grammy awards.

== Background ==
Before the introduction of the long playing disc (LP) in the late 1940s a complete recorded Ring was, as the Decca producer John Culshaw put it, "unthinkable". Piecemeal excerpts had been issued on 78 rpm records, but a complete Ring would have required well over a hundred discs. (Note: A 12-inch 78 disc could hold about five minutes per side of music. The total playing time of the Ring cycle in Decca's recording is a little over fourteen and a half hours.) The Decca record company began recording complete operas on LP in 1950, starting with Mozart's Die Entführung aus dem Serail ("The Seraglio"), but it was believed throughout the industry that studio recordings of Wagner operas would generally be uneconomic. There were two such recordings – Die Meistersinger ("The Mastersingers") (Decca, 1950–51), and Tristan und Isolde (EMI, 1952) (Note: Neither set was made in the recording company's own studios: the Decca set was taped in the Großer Musikvereinssaal, Vienna, and the EMI set at Kingsway Hall, much used by EMI and Decca as a central London recording venue.) – but in general it was thought that the only financially viable course was to tape live performances. (Note: In addition to live theatre recordings, some studio recordings made by broadcasting companies were later issued on disc, including a complete cycle conducted by Wilhelm Furtwängler for an Italian station (recorded in 1953 and released in 1972) and the cut Norwegian Radio Götterdämmerung with Kirsten Flagstad starring as Brünnhilde, recorded by a Norwegian station.) Decca taped the 1951 and 1955 Ring cycles at the Bayreuth Festival, but the results were not considered satisfactory and were not issued at the time. (Note: Götterdämmerung from the 1951 cycle was eventually issued in 1999 and the complete 1955 cycle in 2006.)

Culshaw believed that recording live performances was a second-best approach: he strongly advocated studio recordings in which the absence of the action and staging seen in the theatre would be redressed by imaginative production, "creating something like a 'theatre of the mind' which enabled the listener at home to get involved with Wagner's characters and the sweep of his great music-drama". (Note: On the title page of Ring Resounding, his book about the recording of the cycle, Culshaw quoted the "Perfect Wagnerite" Ernest Newman: "Cannot we dispense altogether with the stage and the visible actor, such external coherence as the music needs being afforded by impersonal voices floating through a darkened auditorium?") For this, he believed, stereophonic recording, developed in the mid-1950s, was a key factor. Alan Rich, music critic of the New York Herald-Tribune, later concurred; having heard the Decca set of Götterdämmerung he wrote that few opera house productions were able to "rekindle the flame of the composer's plan", but in this recording "the most difficult to stage music drama, perhaps, in the entire repertory becomes a complete experience with no staging at all".

Decca hoped to record Die Walküre with Kirsten Flagstad in the central role of Brünnhilde, but she had retired from the operatic stage in the early 1950s, and when Culshaw invited her to record the opera in 1957 she declined to attempt a complete recording. The result was a set of Act I conducted by Hans Knappertsbusch with Flagstad as Sieglinde, and a separate one of the Todesverkündigung ("Announcement of death") scene from Act II, and the whole of Act III, conducted by Georg Solti with Flagstad as Brünnhilde. Both sets were recorded in the Sofiensaal, Vienna; the orchestra was the Vienna Philharmonic.

== 1958: Das Rheingold ==
By 1958 Decca, with its pre-eminent technical team −The Times called them "Decca's incomparable engineers" − was ready to embark on a complete studio recording of the four Ring operas. At Culshaw's instigation the company decided to begin with Das Rheingold, the first and shortest of the four. Culshaw engaged Solti (whom he regarded as "the great Wagner conductor of our time"), the Vienna Philharmonic and a roster of established Wagner singers. The cast included Flagstad in one of her last recorded performances, in the role of Fricka, which she had never sung on stage.

With the help of his engineering colleagues Gordon Parry and James Brown, Culshaw took exceptional pains to meet Wagner's musical requirements. Where the score calls for eighteen anvils to be hammered during two brief orchestral interludes – an instruction never followed in opera houses (Note: Culshaw wrote, "Sometimes you get fobbed off with a sort of electronic compromise; sometimes you get a tinkling sound made by a few people beating metal bars together: but you never get the firm, frightening sound of eighteen anvils hit with rhythmical precision and building into a deafening assault on the nerves.") – Culshaw arranged for eighteen anvils to be hired and hammered, and Parry and Brown successfully captured the sound. There and elsewhere in the score the volume and clarity of sound were unprecedented on disc; the hi-fi aspects of the recording added to its appeal to the LP-buying public, as Culshaw recognised.

=== Cast ===
- Wotan – George London
- Donner – Eberhard Wächter
- Froh – Waldemar Kmentt
- Loge – Set Svanholm
- Alberich – Gustav Neidlinger
- Mime – Paul Kuen
- Fasolt – Walter Kreppel
- Fafner – Kurt Böhme
- Fricka – Kirsten Flagstad
- Freia – Claire Watson
- Erda – Jean Madeira
- Woglinde – Oda Balsborg
- Wellgunde – Hetty Plümacher
- Flosshilde – Ira Malaniuk

- Recorded in the Sofiensaal, Vienna
  24 September − 8 October 1958
- Orchestra: Vienna Philharmonic
- Conductor: Georg Solti
- Producers: John Culshaw and Erik Smith (Note: In the early days of stereo, separate mono and stereo recordings were made on different recording systems. In this case, under Culshaw's overall direction, Parry controlled the mono recording, and Smith and Brown the stereo.)
- Engineers: Gordon Parry and James Brown
- Playing time: 2h 25m 46s
- Original issue: Decca LXT5495−97/SXL2101−3, March 1959

Before the recording sessions, Culshaw's opposite number from EMI, Walter Legge, had remarked to Solti and Culshaw, "Rheingold? A beautiful work, but you won't sell fifty copies". (Note: This is Solti's recollection of the exchange. Culshaw recalled similar sentiments from Legge, but slightly differently phrased: "Very nice, very interesting. But of course you won't sell any".) His prediction was wrong: the LP set won enthusiastic praise from reviewers − The Gramophone described the recording quality as "stupendous" and called the set "wonderful … surpass[ing] anything done before" − and the recording sold in exceptional numbers. It entered the Billboard charts of best-selling LPs, "surrounded by Elvis Presley and Pat Boone, and without another classical recording in sight". But the progress of the Decca Ring was interrupted by contractual considerations. It was agreed by all concerned that for the other three Ring operas the participation of Birgit Nilsson as Brünnhilde was essential. Decca secured an exclusive contract with her, but she made it plain that her first priority was that Decca should record her in Tristan und Isolde. At around the same time she agreed to record Die Walküre for RCA Records, with whom Decca had a reciprocal agreement to share artists. These projects were both brought to fruition, in 1960 and 1961 respectively. Although Die Walküre comes next after Das Rheingold in the tetralogy there was no appetite for another version of it so soon after RCA's, and so the next instalment in the Decca Ring was Siegfried, four years after Das Rheingold.

== 1962: Siegfried ==
For Siegfried, Culshaw had under contract the leading Brünnhilde of the day and, in Hans Hotter, the leading Wotan/Wanderer, but casting the title role caused difficulty. The best-known singer of Siegfried at the time was Wolfgang Windgassen, but in Culshaw's view the performer's voice was showing "distinct signs of wear and tear" after more than ten years of singing Wagner's exceptionally demanding tenor roles. Culshaw found a younger singer, Ernst Kozub, for the role, but despite a fine voice Kozub failed to master the part and Culshaw turned to Windgassen, who stepped in at the last moment. Joan Sutherland undertook the role of the Woodbird (Waldvogel), far removed from her usual repertoire.

=== Cast ===
- Siegfried – Wolfgang Windgassen
- Mime – Gerhard Stolze
- Brünnhilde – Birgit Nilsson
- Wanderer (Wotan) – Hans Hotter
- Alberich – Gustav Neidlinger
- Fafner – Kurt Böhme
- Erda – Marga Höffgen
- Waldvogel – Joan Sutherland

- Recorded in the Sofiensaal, Vienna
  8–11 May and 22 October–5 November 1962
- Orchestra: Vienna Philharmonic
- Conductor: Georg Solti
- Producer: John Culshaw
- Engineers: Gordon Parry and James Brown
- Playing time: 3h 56m 57s
- Original issue: Decca MET242−46/SET242−46; April 1963

The reviews were highly favourable. In The Gramophone Alec Robertson described the set as "the finest recording, as such, of opera that we have had so far, and one that embodies a magnificent performance of the great work". The Stereo Record Guide commented, "Solti's array of singers could hardly be bettered. Windgassen is at the very peak of his form, lyrical as well as heroic. Hotter has never been more impressive on records, his Wotan at last captured adequately. Stolze, Neidlinger and Böhme are all exemplary and, predictably, Joan Sutherland makes the most seductive of woodbirds". In High Fidelity Conrad L. Osborne called the set "Solti's finest recorded accomplishment to date", and added, "On to Götterdämmerung, please".

== 1964: Götterdämmerung ==
Culshaw wrote, "Nilsson, Windgassen and Gottlob Frick (Hagen) had to be in the cast or there was no point in starting", and they were duly cast. The only major role in the piece for which no singer was the obvious choice was Gunther, "an important but weak character", who Culshaw considered needed a strong singer to prevent him from being overshadowed. Dietrich Fischer-Dieskau agreed to sing the part. As Wagner called for steerhorns in Act II, Culshaw determined not to resort to the trombones usually played in the opera house, and commissioned a set of specially made steerhorns to produce the requisite "primitive, uncouth sound". Another, more controversial, attempt to represent Wagner's intentions was near the end of Act I, where the tenor Siegfried impersonates the baritone Gunther: the engineers subjected Windgassen's recorded voice to technological intervention to make it temporarily sound more like that of Fischer-Dieskau.

=== Cast ===
- Brünnhilde – Birgit Nilsson
- Siegfried – Wolfgang Windgassen
- Waltraute – Christa Ludwig
- Gunther – Dietrich Fischer-Dieskau
- Gutrune – Claire Watson
- Alberich – Gustav Neidlinger
- Hagen – Gottlob Frick
- First Norn – Helen Watts
- Second Norn – Grace Hoffman
- Third Norn – Anita Välkki
- Woglinde – Lucia Popp
- Wellgunde – Gwyneth Jones
- Flosshilde – Maureen Guy

- Recorded in the Sofiensaal, Vienna
  20–27 May, 1–2 June, 27–31 October, 3–5, 17–20 and 22–24 November 1964.
- Orchestra: Vienna Philharmonic
- Chorus: Vienna State Opera Chorus
- Conductor: Georg Solti
- Producers: John Culshaw and Christopher Raeburn
- Engineers: Gordon Parry and James Brown
- Playing time: 4h 24m 52s
- Original issue: Decca MET292–97/SET292−97; May 1965

The reception of the set surpassed that given to its two predecessors. In The Gramophone, Robertson called it "the greatest achievement in gramophone history yet", and Desmond Shawe-Taylor described it as "a glorious achievement, which it will be difficult to equal and almost impossible to surpass". Andrew Porter called it a "landmark in gramophone history". In The Sydney Morning Herald, Roger Covell wrote of "the alchemy of Decca's magnificent, stunning, overwhelming new recording", and The New York Herald-Tribune's Rich wrote, "It is not only Wagner and Götterdämmerung that are justified by this new album. Suddenly the whole concept of recorded opera seems to make a new kind of sense".

== 1965: Die Walküre ==
For the last of the four Ring operas to be recorded for Decca's cycle, Nilsson and Hotter were cast as before. Windgassen did not wish to record Siegmund, the tenor lead, and James King took the role. For Sieglinde, Culshaw cast Régine Crespin. Flagstad had died in 1962 and for Fricka, which she had played in Das Rheingold, Culshaw hoped to cast another former Brünnhilde, Astrid Varnay, but she declined and Christa Ludwig sang the part. Among the nine Valkyries were well-known singers including Helga Dernesch, Brigitte Fassbaender and Berit Lindholm.

=== Cast ===
- Siegmund – James King
- Sieglinde – Régine Crespin
- Wotan – Hans Hotter
- Brünnhilde – Birgit Nilsson
- Hunding – Gottlob Frick
- Fricka – Christa Ludwig
- Gerhilde – Vera Schlosser
- Ortlinde – Helga Dernesch
- Waltraute – Brigitte Fassbaender
- Schwertleite – Helen Watts
- Helmwige – Berit Lindholm
- Siegrune – Vera Little
- Grimgerde – Marilyn Tyler
- Rossweisse – Claudia Hellmann

- Recorded in the Sofiensaal, Vienna
  31 October, 2–5, 8–12 and 15–19 November 1965
- Orchestra: Vienna Philharmonic
- Conductor: Georg Solti
- Producer: John Culshaw
- Engineers: Gordon Parry and James Brown
- Playing time: 3h 48m 59s
- Original issue: Decca MET312–16/SET312–16; September 1966

The set was well received, but the predominantly lyrical Die Walküre could not make the impact that Götterdämmerung had done; The Times commented, "After Götterdämmerung' anything is an anticlimax. Solti has not attempted to overtrump, but to complete a satisfying Ring". Unlike its three predecessors it did not have the field to itself: Die Walküre was already available on disc in recordings conducted by Wilhelm Furtwängler and Erich Leinsdorf. Some reviewers felt that Hotter's Wotan, recorded late in his career, did not show him in his finest voice. (William Mann complained of "Hotter's foggy Wotan" as well as Crespin's "blowsy Sieglinde", although Robertson, acknowledging Hotter's "uncomfortable patches", felt that no other singer could "invest the part with such authority".) (Note: Other less than admiring remarks about the participants included Walter Legge's comment that Wieland Wagner had complained about "Solti's orgasms in every second bar" as a Wagner conductor. Solti was invited to conduct at Bayreuth, but not until long after Wieland Wagner's death.)

== 1968: complete cycle ==
In 1968 Decca issued the cycle as an integral set on 19 LPs, together with a three-disc addendum consisting of Wagner's Siegfried Idyll and Kinderkatechismus ("Children's Catechism") both conducted by Solti, and an illustrated musical analysis of The Ring by the musicologist Deryck Cooke. Porter commented, "The magnificent Decca Ring des Nibelungen has been generally hailed as the gramophone's greatest achievement". The recordings were later transferred from analogue to digital for issue on CD. Decca made four digital transfers, the first in 1984, two years after CDs became generally available; later transfers, taking advantage of technological developments, were made in 1997, 2012 and 2022. Reviewing a 2015 reissue, Paul Robinson, writing in the journal of the Music Critics Association of North America, judged it to be the "benchmark recording … by which all others are judged". In polls for Gramophone (1999) and BBC Music Magazine (2012) the Decca Ring was voted "the greatest recording of all time", and the phrase has been echoed by writers in the US and Australia. In 2008 The Penguin Guide to Recorded Classical Music said of the set, "Whether in performances or in vividness of sound, it remains the most electrifying account of the tetralogy on disc, with Götterdämmerung "a peak of achievement for [Solti], commanding and magnificent". The complete cycle and its component parts have won numerous honours, including Grand Prix du Disque Mondiale and Grammy awards.

== Notes, references and sources ==
=== Sources ===
==== Books ====
- Blyth, Alan (1979). Opera on Record. London: Hutchinson. ISBN 978-0-09-139980-1.
- Culshaw, John (1967). Ring Resounding. London: Secker & Warburg. ISBN 978-0-436-11800-5.
- Greenfield, Edward; Ivan March; Denis Stevens (1966). The Stereo Record Guide. Vol. 4. Blackpool: Long Playing Record Library. OCLC 873096263.
- March, Ivan; Edward Greenfield; Robert Layton; Paul Czajkowski (2008). The Penguin Guide to Recorded Classical Music 2009. London: Penguin. ISBN 978-0-141-03335-8.
- March, Ivan, ed. (1967). The Great Records. Blackpool: Long Playing Record Library. OCLC 4195421.
- Pettitt, Stephen (1985). Philharmonia Orchestra: A Record of Achievement 1945–1985. London: Robert Hale. ISBN 978-0-7090-2371-5.
- Schwarzkopf, Elisabeth (1982). On and Off the Record: A Memoir of Walter Legge. London: Faber and Faber. ISBN 978-0-571-11928-8.
- Solti, Georg (1997). Solti on Solti. London: Chatto and Windus. ISBN 978-0-7011-6630-4.

==== Web ====
- Stuart, Philip (July 2009). "Decca Classical, 1929–2009" (PDF). CHARM. AHRC Research Centre for the History and Analysis of Recorded Music. Archived from the original (PDF) on 23 September 2024.
