= Oda Balsborg =

Danish operatic soprano

Oda Balsborg was a Danish operatic soprano.

== Biography ==
Oda Balsborg was born in Copenhagen on 12 January 1934. She began her career at the Hamburg State Opera.

Her repertoire included the roles of Clorinda in La Cenerentola, the First Lady in The Magic Flute and Woglinde in Das Rheingold. On record, in the last of these roles, she is heard singing the opening words in the first published recording of the work, conducted by Georg Solti in 1958. Earlier, Balsborg sang Gerhilde in Solti's recording of act 3 of Die Walküre in which Kirsten Flagstad sang Brünnhilde.

Balsborg died in Copenhagen on 2 September 2014, aged 80.

== Sources ==
- Culshaw, John (1967). Ring Resounding. London: Secker & Warburg. ISBN 978-0-436-11800-5.
- Ross, Anne (1961). The Opera Directory. London and New York: John Calder and Sterling. OCLC 1036766466.
