= Ernst Kozub =

German opera singer

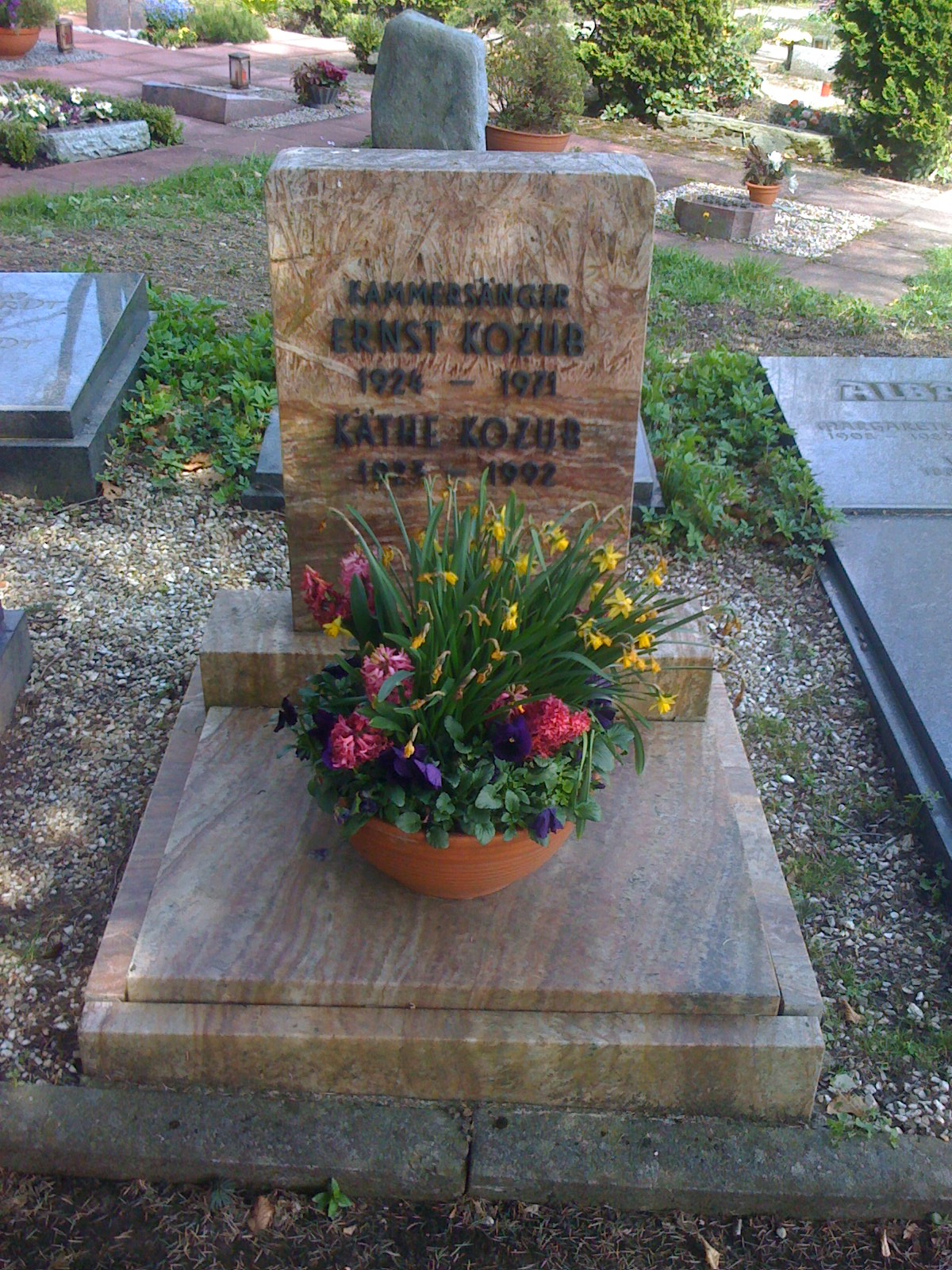
Kozub's grave at the Königstein cemetery

Ernst Kozub (January 24, 1924 – December 27, 1971) was a German tenor and opera singer.

Kozub was born in Duisburg, Germany. Though his early death prevented him from fully realising his promise, he stands out as one of the notable heldentenor voices of the 1960s. He is best known for his Wagnerian roles, including Erik in Der fliegende Holländer (which he recorded with Theo Adam and Anja Silja in 1968). Because of the quality of his voice, John Culshaw initially cast him as Siegfried in the Decca recording of Der Ring des Nibelungen, but his failure to learn the role caused him to be replaced at the last minute by Wolfgang Windgassen.

Kozub died in 1971 in Bad Soden, having only performed his last Tannhäuser in Italy three weeks before his death.
