= Georg Solti =

British conductor (1912–1997)

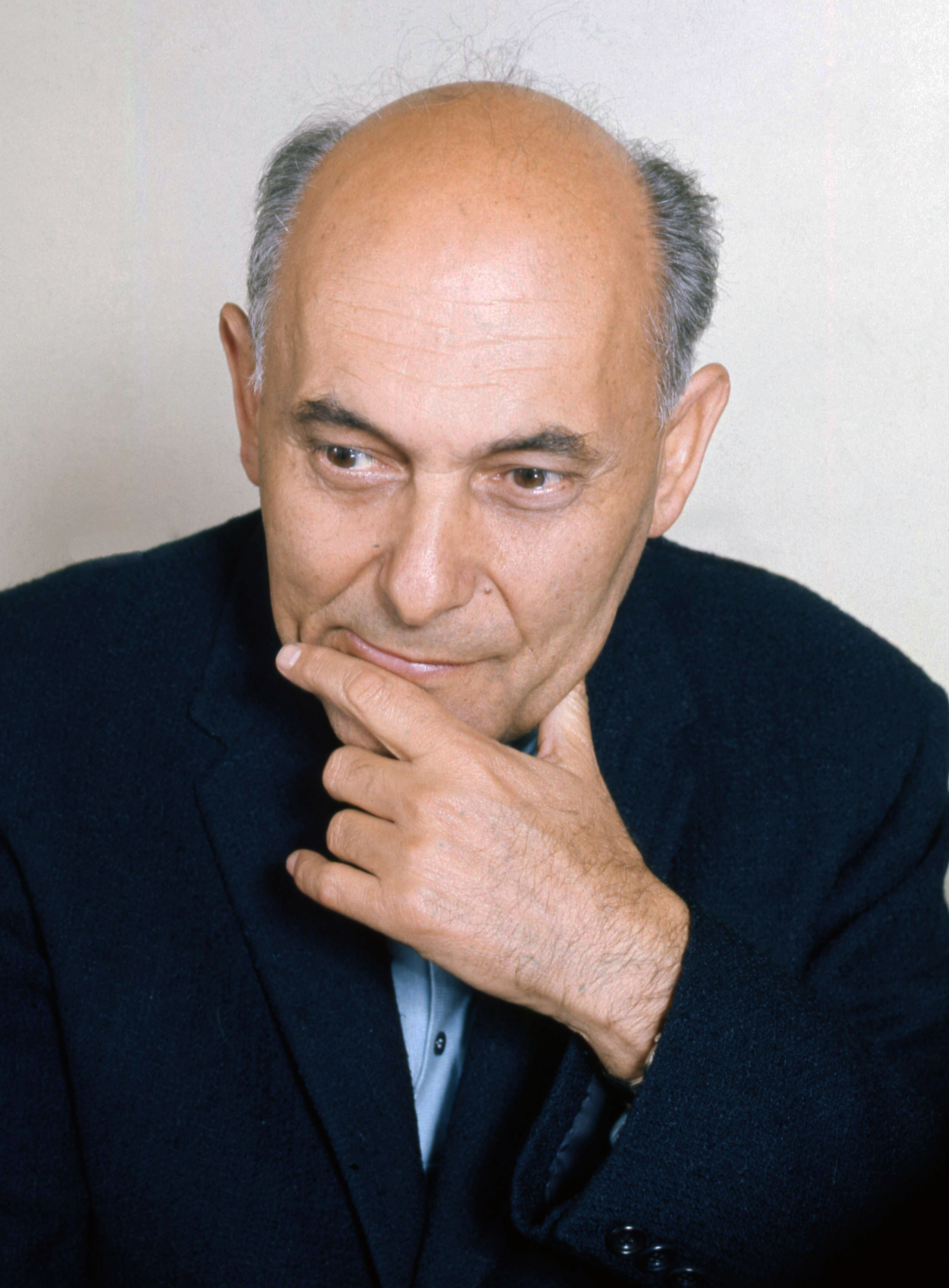
Solti by Allan Warren, 1975

Sir Georg Solti (/dʒɔːrdʒ ˈʃɒlti/ jorj SHOL-tee, Hungarian: [ˈʃolti]; born György Stern; 21 October 1912 – 5 September 1997) was a Hungarian and British orchestral and operatic conductor, known for his appearances with opera companies in Munich, Frankfurt, and London, and as a long-serving music director of the Chicago Symphony Orchestra. Born in Budapest, he studied there with Béla Bartók, Leó Weiner, and Ernő Dohnányi. In the 1930s, he was a répétiteur at the Hungarian State Opera and worked at the Salzburg Festival for Arturo Toscanini. His career was interrupted by the rise of the Nazis' influence on Hungarian politics, and being Jewish, he fled the increasingly harsh Hungarian anti-Jewish laws in 1938. After conducting a season of Russian ballet in London at the Royal Opera House, he found refuge in Switzerland, where he remained during the Second World War. Prohibited from conducting there, he earned a living as a pianist.

After the war, Solti was appointed musical director of the Bavarian State Opera in Munich in 1946. In 1952, he moved to the Oper Frankfurt, where he remained in charge for nine years. He took West German citizenship in 1953. In 1961, he became musical director of the Covent Garden Opera Company, London. During his 10-year tenure, he introduced changes that raised standards to the highest international levels. Under his musical directorship, the status of the company was recognised with the grant of the title "the Royal Opera". He became an honorary citizen of the coastal holiday town of Castiglione della Pescaia, and a British citizen in 1972.

In 1969, Solti became music director of the Chicago Symphony Orchestra, a post he held for 22 years. He conducted many recordings and high-profile international tours with the orchestra. Solti relinquished the position in 1991 and became the orchestra's music director laureate, a position he held until his death. During his time as the Chicago Symphony Orchestra's eighth music director, he also served as music director of the Orchestre de Paris from 1972 until 1975 and principal conductor of the London Philharmonic Orchestra from 1979 until 1983.

Known in his early years for the intensity of his music making, Solti was widely considered to have mellowed as a conductor in later years. He recorded many works two or three times at various stages of his career, and was a prolific recording artist, making more than 250 recordings, including 45 complete opera sets. The best-known of his recordings is probably Decca's complete set of Richard Wagner's Der Ring des Nibelungen, made between 1958 and 1965. Solti's Ring has twice been voted the greatest recording ever made, in polls for Gramophone magazine in 1999 and the BBC's Music Magazine in 2012. Solti was repeatedly honoured by the recording industry with awards throughout his career. From 1963 to 1998, he won 31 Grammy Awards as a recording artist, making him the Grammy Awards' most-awarded artist until Beyoncé surpassed his record in 2023.

== Life and career ==
=== Early years ===
Solti was born György Stern on Maros utca, in the Hegyvidék district of the Buda side of Budapest. He was the younger of the two children of Teréz (née Rosenbaum) and Móricz "Mór" Stern, both of whom were Jewish. In the aftermath of the First World War it became the accepted practice in Hungary for citizens with Germanic surnames to adopt Hungarian ones. The territorial revisionist regime of Admiral Horthy enacted a series of Hungarianisation laws, including a requirement that state employees with foreign-sounding names must change them. Mór Stern, a self-employed merchant, felt no need to change his surname, but thought it prudent to change that of his children. He renamed them after Solt, a small town in central Hungary. (Note: The family had no connection with Solt, and Stern appears to have selected it at random.) His son's given name, György, was acceptably Hungarian and was not changed.

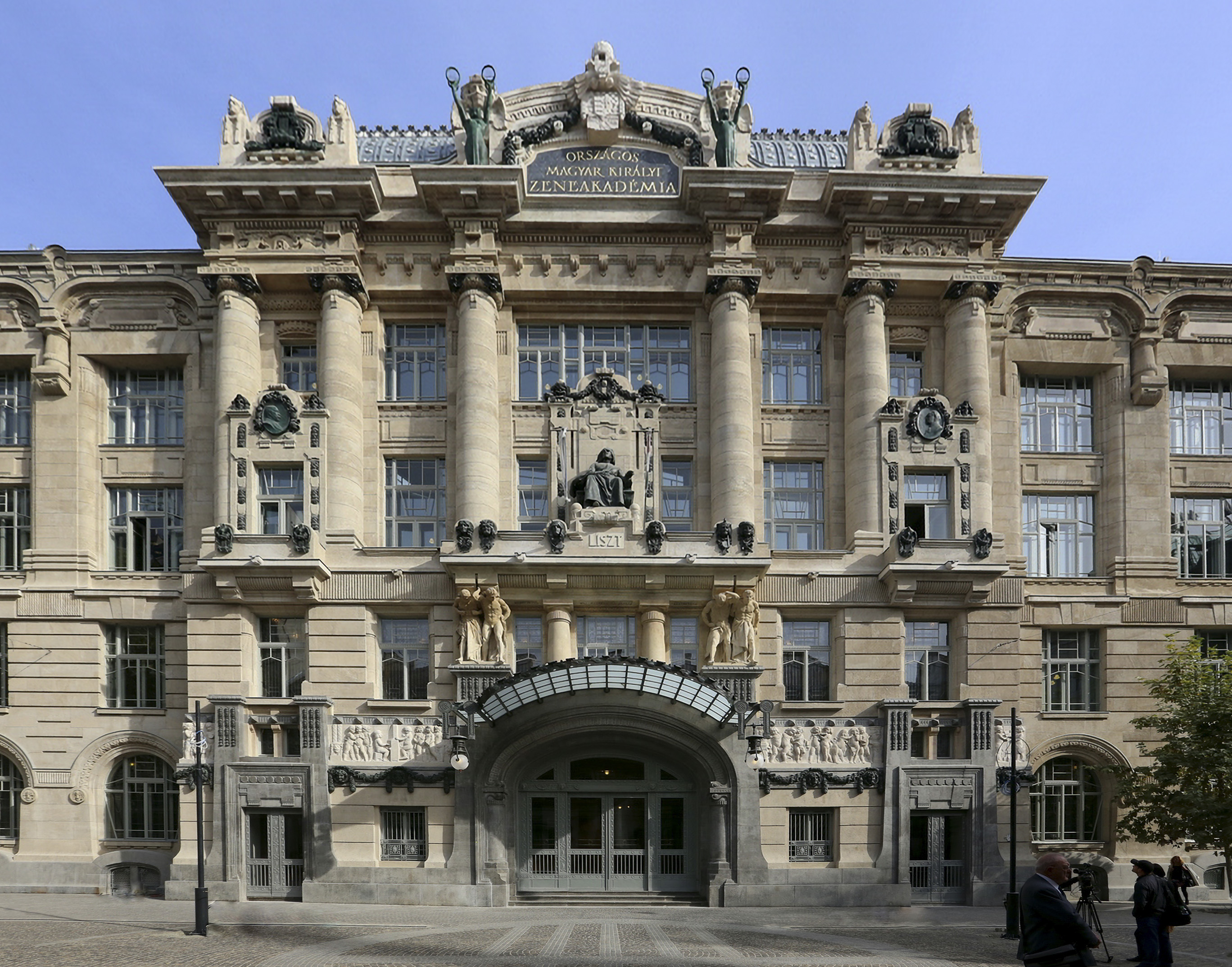
Franz Liszt Academy, Budapest

Solti described his father as "a kind, sweet man who trusted everyone. He shouldn't have, but he did. Jews in Hungary were tremendously patriotic. In 1914, when war broke out, my father invested most of his money in a war loan to help the country. By the time the bonds matured, they were worthless." Mór Stern was a religious man, but his son was less so. Late in life, Solti recalled, "I often upset him because I never stayed in the synagogue for longer than 10 minutes." Teréz Stern was from a musical family, and encouraged her daughter Lilly, by eight years the elder of the children, to sing, and György to accompany her on the piano. Solti remembered, "I made so many mistakes, but it was invaluable experience for an opera conductor. I learnt to swim with her." He was not a diligent student of the piano: "My mother kept telling me to practise, but what 10-year-old wants to play the piano when he could be out playing football?"

Solti enrolled at the Ernő Fodor School of Music in Budapest at the age of 10, transferring to the more prestigious Franz Liszt Academy two years later. When he was 12, he heard a performance of Beethoven's Fifth Symphony conducted by Erich Kleiber, which gave him the ambition to become a conductor. His parents could not afford to pay for years of musical education, and his rich uncles did not consider music a suitable profession; from the age of 13, Solti paid for his education by giving piano lessons.

The faculty of the Franz Liszt Academy included some of the most eminent Hungarian musicians, including Béla Bartók, Leó Weiner, Ernő Dohnányi, and Zoltán Kodály. Solti studied under the first three, for piano, chamber music, and composition, respectively. Some sources state that he also studied with Kodály, but in his memoirs, Solti recalled that Kodály, whom he would have preferred, turned him down, leaving him to study composition first with Albert Siklós and then with Dohnányi. Not all the academy's tutors were equally distinguished; Solti remembered with little pleasure the conducting classes run by Ernő Unger, "who instructed his pupils to use rigid little wrist motions. I attended the class for only two years, but I needed five years of practical conducting experience before I managed to unlearn what he had taught me".

=== Pianist and conductor ===
After graduating from the academy in 1930, Solti was appointed to the staff of the Hungarian State Opera. (Note: This appointment came under the scope of another of Horthy's laws, requiring that state employees must be able to prove that their families had lived in Hungary for at least 50 years. Mor Stern went to the records office in his native village of Balatonfőkajár and found documents showing that his family had lived there for more than 250 years.) He found that working as a répétiteur, coaching singers in their roles and playing at rehearsals, was a more fruitful preparation than Unger's classes for his intended career as a conductor. In 1932, he went to Karlsruhe in Germany as assistant to Josef Krips, but within a year, Krips, anticipating the imminent rise to power of Hitler and the Nazis, insisted that Solti should go home to Budapest, where at that time Jews were not in danger. Other Jewish and anti-Nazi musicians also left Germany for Budapest. Among other musical exiles with whom Solti worked there were Otto Klemperer, Fritz Busch, and Kleiber. Before Austria fell under Nazi control, Solti was assistant to Arturo Toscanini at the 1937 Salzburg Festival:

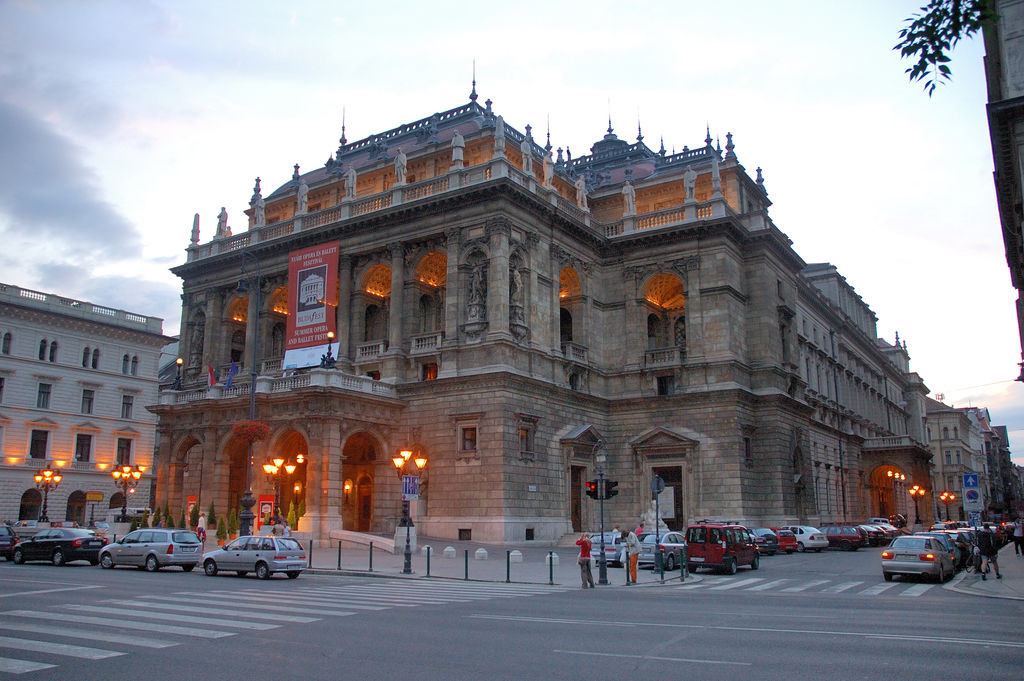
Hungarian State Opera House

Toscanini was the first great musical impression in my life. Before I heard him live in 1936, I had never heard a great opera conductor, not in Budapest, and it was like a lightning flash. I heard his Falstaff in 1936 and the impact was unbelievable. It was the first time I heard an ensemble singing absolutely precisely. It was fantastic. Then I never expected to meet Toscanini. It was a chance in a million. I had a letter of recommendation from the director of the Budapest Opera to the president of the Salzburg Festival. He received me and said: "Do you know Magic Flute, because we have an influenza epidemic and two of our repetiteurs are ill? Could you play this afternoon for the stage rehearsals?"

After further work as a répétiteur at the opera in Budapest, and with his standing enhanced by his association with Toscanini, Solti was given his first chance to conduct, on 11 March 1938. (Note: Solti wrote that, as far as he knew, he was the first unconverted Jew to conduct at the State Opera.) The opera was Mozart's The Marriage of Figaro. During that evening, news came of the German invasion of Austria. Many Hungarians feared that Hitler would next invade Hungary; he did not do so, but Horthy, to strengthen his partnership with the Nazis, instituted anti-semitic laws, mirroring the Nuremberg Laws, restricting Hungary's Jews from engaging in professions. Solti's family urged him to move away. He went first to London, where he made his Covent Garden debut, conducting the London Philharmonic for a Russian ballet season. The reviewer in The Times was not impressed with Solti's efforts, finding them "too violent, for he lashed at the orchestra and flogged the music so that he endangered the delicate, evocative atmosphere." At about this time Solti dropped the name "György" in favour of "Georg".

After his appearances in London, Solti went to Switzerland to seek out Toscanini, who was conducting in Lucerne. Solti hoped that Toscanini would help find him a post in the U.S. He was unable to do so, but Solti found work and security in Switzerland as vocal coach to tenor Max Hirzel, who was learning the role of Tristan in Wagner's opera. Throughout the Second World War, Solti remained in Switzerland. He did not see his father again; Mór Stern died of diabetes in a Budapest hospital in 1943. Solti was reunited with his mother and sister after the war. In Switzerland, he could not obtain a work permit as a conductor, but earned his living as a piano teacher. After he won the 1942 Geneva International Piano Competition, he was permitted to give piano recitals, but was still not allowed to conduct. During his exile, he met Hedwig (Hedi) Oeschli, daughter of a lecturer at Zürich University; they married in 1946. In his memoirs, he wrote of her, "She was very elegant and sophisticated. ... Hedi gave me a little grace and taught me good manners – although she never completely succeeded in this. She also helped me enormously in my career".

=== Munich and Frankfurt ===
With the end of the war, Solti's luck changed dramatically. He was appointed musical director of the Bavarian State Opera in Munich in 1946. In normal circumstances, this prestigious post would have been an unthinkable appointment for a young and inexperienced conductor, (Note: Solti's predecessors included prominent conductors such as Hans von Bülow, Hermann Levi, Richard Strauss, Bruno Walter, Hans Knappertsbusch, and Clemens Krauss.) but the leading German conductors such as Wilhelm Furtwängler, Clemens Krauss, and Herbert von Karajan were prohibited from conducting pending the conclusion of denazification proceedings against them. Under Solti's direction, the company rebuilt its repertoire and began to recover its prewar eminence. He benefited from the encouragement of the elderly Richard Strauss, in whose presence he conducted Der Rosenkavalier. Strauss was reluctant to discuss his own music with Solti, but gave him advice about conducting.

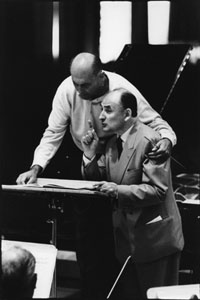
Solti (l) with the pianist Nikita Magaloff

In addition to the Munich appointment, Solti gained a recording contract in 1946. He signed for Decca Records, not as a conductor, but as a piano accompanist. He made his first recording in 1947, playing Brahms's First Violin Sonata with violinist Georg Kulenkampff. He was insistent that he wanted to conduct, and Decca gave him his first recording sessions as a conductor later in the same year, with the Zurich Tonhalle Orchestra in Beethoven's Egmont overture. Twenty years later, Solti said, "I'm sure it's a terrible record, because the orchestra was not very good at that time and I was so excited. It is horrible, surely horrible – but by now it has vanished." He had to wait two years for his next recording as a conductor, in London, Haydn's Drum Roll symphony, in sessions produced by John Culshaw, with whose career Solti's became closely linked over the next two decades. Reviewing the record, The Gramophone said, "The performance of the London Philharmonic Orchestra under Georg Solti (a fine conductor who is new to me) is remarkable for rhythmic playing, richness of tone, and clarity of execution." The Record Guide compared it favourably with EMI's rival recording by Sir Thomas Beecham and the Royal Philharmonic.

In 1951, Solti conducted at the Salzburg Festival for the first time, partly through the influence of Furtwängler, who was impressed by him. The work was Mozart's Idomeneo, which had not been given there before. In Munich, Solti achieved critical and popular success, but for political reasons, his position at the State Opera was never secure. The view persisted that a German conductor should be in charge; pressure mounted, and after five years, Solti accepted an offer to move to Frankfurt in 1952 as musical director of the Oper Frankfurt. (Note: Solti's successor at Munich was the German Rudolf Kempe.) The city's opera house had been destroyed in the war, and Solti undertook to build a new company and repertoire for its recently completed replacement. He also conducted the symphony concerts given by the opera orchestra. Frankfurt's was a less prestigious house than Munich's and he initially regarded the move as a demotion, but he found the post fulfilling and remained at Frankfurt from 1952 to 1961, presenting 33 operas, 19 of which he had not conducted before. Frankfurt, unlike Munich, could not attract many of the leading German singers. Solti recruited many rising young American singers such as Claire Watson and Sylvia Stahlman, to the extent that the house acquired the nickname "Amerikanische Oper am Main". (Note: "The American Opera on the Main", a play on the title of the Deutsche Oper am Rhein – the German Opera on the Rhine – at Düsseldorf.) In 1953, the West German government offered Solti German citizenship, which, being effectively stateless as a Hungarian exile, he gratefully accepted. He believed he could never return to Hungary, by then under communist rule. He remained a German citizen for two decades.

During his Frankfurt years, Solti made appearances with other opera companies and orchestras. He conducted in the Americas for the first time in 1952, giving concerts in Buenos Aires. In the same year, he made his debut at the Edinburgh Festival as a guest conductor with the visiting Hamburg State Opera. The following year, he was a guest at the San Francisco Opera with Elektra, Die Walküre, and Tristan und Isolde. In 1954, he conducted Don Giovanni at the Glyndebourne Festival. The reviewer in The Times said that no fault could be found in Solti's "vivacious and sensitive" conducting. In the same year Solti made his first appearance with the Chicago Symphony Orchestra, at the Ravinia Festival. In 1960, he made his debut at the Metropolitan Opera in New York City, conducting Tannhäuser, and he continued to appear there until 1964.

In the recording studios, Solti's career took off after 1956, when John Culshaw was put in charge of Decca's classical recording programme. Culshaw believed Solti to be "the great Wagner conductor of our time", and was determined to record the four operas of Der Ring des Nibelungen with Solti and the finest Wagner singers available. The cast Culshaw assembled for the cycle included Kirsten Flagstad, Hans Hotter, Birgit Nilsson and Wolfgang Windgassen. Apart from Arabella in 1957, in which he substituted when Karl Böhm withdrew, Solti had made no complete recording of an opera until the sessions for Das Rheingold, the first of the Ring tetralogy, in September and October 1958. In their respective memoirs, Culshaw and Solti told how Walter Legge of Decca's rival EMI predicted that Das Rheingold would be a commercial disaster ("'Very nice,' he said, 'Very interesting. But of course you won't sell any.'") (Note: Solti and Culshaw recalled Legge's words slightly differently, though the import was the same; Solti remembered Legge's words as, "A beautiful work, but you won't sell fifty copies.") The success of the recording took the record industry by surprise. It featured for weeks in the Billboard charts, the sole classical album alongside best sellers by Elvis Presley and Pat Boone, and brought Solti's name to international prominence. He appeared with leading orchestras in New York City, Vienna, and Los Angeles, and at Covent Garden, he conducted Der Rosenkavalier and Britten's A Midsummer Night's Dream.

=== Covent Garden ===
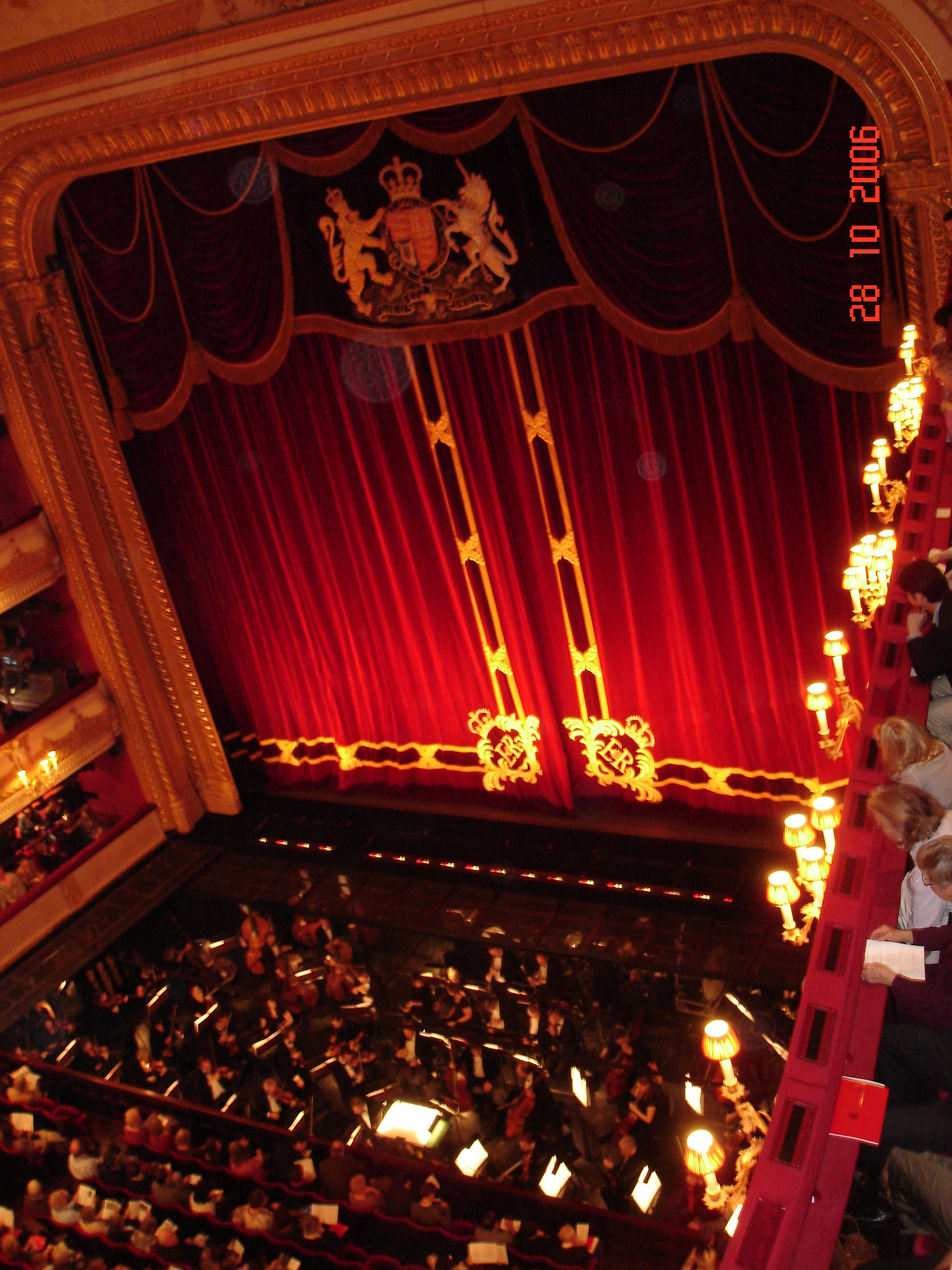
Royal Opera House, Covent Garden

In 1960, Solti signed a three-year contract to be music director of the Los Angeles Philharmonic from 1962. Even before he took the post, the philharmonic's autocratic president, Dorothy Chandler, breached his contract by appointing a deputy music director without Solti's approval. Although he admired the chosen deputy, Zubin Mehta, Solti felt he could not have his authority undermined from the outset, and he withdrew from his appointment. He accepted an offer to become musical director of Covent Garden Opera Company, London. When first sounded out about the post, he had declined it. After 14 years of experience at Munich and Frankfurt, he was uncertain that he wanted a third successive operatic post. Moreover, founded only 15 years earlier, the Covent Garden company was not yet the equal of the best opera houses in Europe. Bruno Walter convinced Solti that it was his duty to take on Covent Garden.

Biographer Montague Haltrecht suggests that Solti seized the breach of his Los Angeles contract as a convenient pretext to abandon the philharmonic in favour of Covent Garden. In his memoirs, though, Solti wrote that he wanted the Los Angeles position very much indeed. He originally considered holding both posts in tandem, but later acknowledged that he had had a lucky escape, as he could have done justice to neither post had he attempted to hold both simultaneously. Coinciding with his first season at Covent Garden in 1961-62, he also served as music director of the Dallas Symphony Orchestra for one season. In Dallas he conducted 21 concerts over two one-month periods.

Solti took up the musical directorship of Covent Garden in August 1961. The press gave him a cautious welcome, but some concern arose that under him a drift away from the company's original policy of opera in English might occur. Solti, however, was an advocate of opera in the vernacular, (Note: At Munich and Frankfurt, the usual practice had been to give non-German operas in German translation.) and he promoted the development of British and Commonwealth singers in the company, frequently casting them in his recordings and important productions in preference to overseas artists. He demonstrated his belief in vernacular opera with a triple bill in English of Ravel's L'heure espagnole, Schoenberg's Erwartung, and Puccini's Gianni Schicchi. As the decade went on, however, more and more productions had to be sung in the original language to accommodate international stars.

[Solti] announced his intention of making Covent Garden "quite simply, the best opera house in the world", and in the opinion of many he succeeded.

— Grove Dictionary of Music and Musicians

Like his predecessor Rafael Kubelík, and his successor Colin Davis, Solti found his early days as musical director marred by vituperative hostility from a small clique in the Covent Garden audience. Rotten vegetables were thrown at him, and his car was vandalised outside the theatre, with the words "Solti must go!" scratched on its paintwork. Some press reviews were strongly critical; Solti was so wounded by a review in The Times of his conducting of The Marriage of Figaro that he almost left Covent Garden in despair. (Note: The anonymous Times reviewer had complained of Solti's "supercharged, chromium-plated account of the score ... many details were simply glossed over ... heartless and featureless." The Observer, however, had praised the conductor's "intelligence and sensitivity". and The Guardian spoke of "tremendous verve plus real security in the ensemble on stage".) The chief executive of the Opera House, Sir David Webster, persuaded him to stay with the company, and matters improved, helped by changes on which Solti insisted. The chorus and orchestra were strengthened, and in the interests of musical and dramatic excellence, Solti secured the introduction of the stagione system of scheduling performances, rather than the traditional repertory system. (Note: Under the old repertory system, a company would have a certain number of operas in its repertoire, and they would be played throughout the season in a succession of one- or two-night performances, with little or no rehearsal each time. Under the stagione system, works would be revived in blocks of perhaps 10 or more performances, fully rehearsed for each revival.) By 1967, The Times commented that "Patrons of Covent Garden today automatically expect any new production, and indeed any revival, to be as strongly cast as anything at the Met in New York, and as carefully presented as anything in Milan or Vienna".

The company's repertory in the 1960s combined the standard operatic works with less familiar pieces. Among the most celebrated productions during Solti's time in charge was Schoenberg's Moses and Aaron in the 1965–66 and 1966–67 seasons. In 1970, Solti led the company to Germany, where they gave Don Carlos, Falstaff, and Victory, a new work by Richard Rodney Bennett. The public in Munich and Berlin were, according to the Frankfurter Allgemeine Zeitung, "beside themselves with enthusiasm".

Solti's bald head and demanding rehearsal style earned him the nickname "The Screaming Skull". A music historian called him "the bustling, bruising Georg Solti – a man whose entire physical and mental attitude embodied the words 'I'm in charge'." Singers such as Peter Glossop described him as a bully, and after working with Solti, Jon Vickers refused to do so again. (Note: Solti later expressed doubt about this view of his tenure at Covent Garden. He maintained that if he had been an autocrat, he was a benign one, and stories that he terrified singers were exaggerated: "There were not many scandals in my Covent Garden career; a few, but not serious – not à la Toscanini or à la Karajan. I didn't have those, not really.") Nevertheless, under Solti, the company was recognised as having achieved parity with the greatest opera houses in the world. Queen Elizabeth II conferred the title "the Royal Opera" on the company in 1968. By this point, Solti was, in the words of his biographer Paul Robinson, "after Karajan, the most celebrated conductor at work". By the end of his decade as music director at Covent Garden Solti had conducted the company in 33 operas by 13 composers. (Note: The operas new to the company's repertoire were: La damnation de Faust, A Midsummer Night's Dream, Iphigénie en Tauride, Orfeo ed Euridice, Gianni Schicchi, L'heure espagnole, Erwartung, Moses and Aaron, Arabella, Die Frau ohne Schatten, Eugene Onegin, Falstaff and La forza del destino. The other operas Solti conducted before stepping down in 1972 were: Fidelio, Billy Budd, Così fan tutte, Don Giovanni, Le nozze di Figaro, The Magic Flute, The Tales of Hoffmann, Der Rosenkavalier, Elektra, Salome, Don Carlos, Otello, Rigoletto, Der fliegende Holländer, Das Rheingold, Die Walküre, Siegfried, Götterdämmerung, Tristan und Isolde and Die Meistersinger.)

In 1964, Solti separated from his wife. He moved into the Savoy Hotel, where not long afterwards he met Valerie Pitts, a British television presenter, sent to interview him. She, too, was married, but after pursuing her for three years, Solti persuaded her to divorce her husband. Solti and Valerie Pitts married on 11 November 1967. They had two daughters.

=== Chicago Symphony Orchestra ===
In 1967, Solti was invited to become music director of the Chicago Symphony Orchestra. It was the second time he had been offered the post. The first had been in 1963 after the death of the orchestra's conductor, Fritz Reiner, who made its reputation in the previous decade. Solti told the representatives of the orchestra that his commitments at Covent Garden made it impossible to give Chicago the eight months a year they sought. He suggested giving them three and a half months a year and inviting Carlo Maria Giulini to take charge for a similar length of time. The orchestra declined to proceed on these lines.

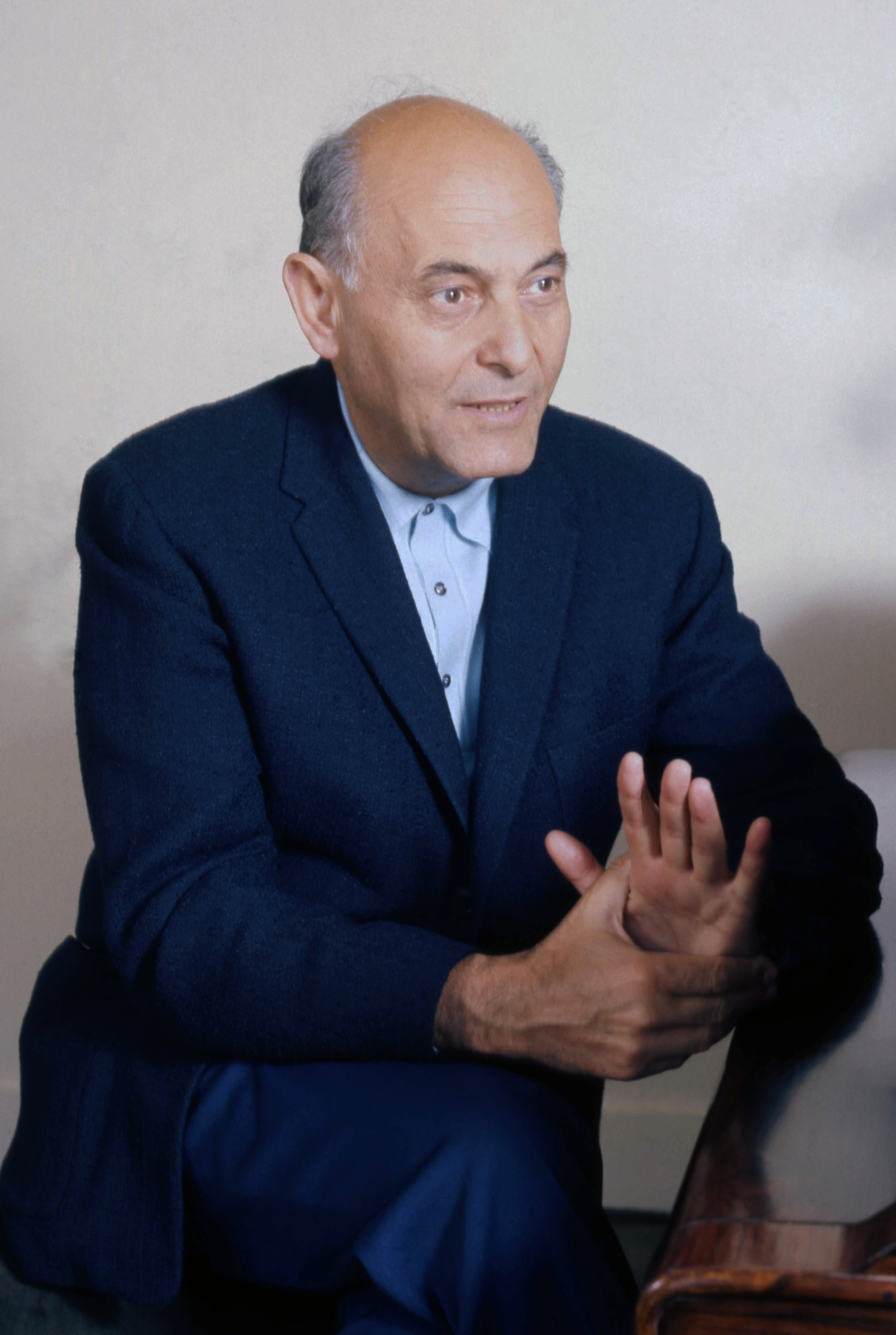
Solti (1975)

When Solti accepted the orchestra's second invitation, they agreed that Giulini should be appointed to share the conducting. (Note: The management of the orchestra had privately hoped for a triumvirate of famous conductors, with Karajan as chief and Solti and Giulini as guests, but Karajan declined. Karajan's biographer Richard Osborne comments that the outcome was probably fortunate for the Chicago Symphony, as it gained "a music director who in the fullness of time would devote a large part of his life to the orchestra.") Both conductors signed three-year contracts with the orchestra, effective from 1969.

One of the members of the Chicago Symphony described it to Solti as "the best provincial orchestra in the world." Many players remained from its celebrated decade under Reiner, but morale was low, and the orchestra was $5M in debt. Solti concluded that raising the orchestra's international profile was essential. He ensured that it was engaged for many of his Decca sessions, and Giulini and he led it in a European tour in 1971, playing in 10 countries. This was the first time in its 80-year history that the orchestra had played outside of North America. The orchestra received plaudits from European critics, (Note: After the orchestra played at the Edinburgh Festival, critic William Mann wrote, "I am tempted to describe it as the United States' most completely accomplished orchestra. It has the fine attack of the New York Phil under Bernstein, the radiance of the Boston under Leinsdorf, the classic elegance of the Cleveland under Szell, and to these qualities it adds, under Solti, a warm, human musical expressiveness that one associates with European rather than modern American orchestras." After one of the London concerts, Alan Blyth wrote, "nobody could doubt that this is about the most formidably equipped orchestra in the world at present".) and was welcomed home at the end of the tour with a ticker-tape parade.

The orchestra's principal flute player, Donald Peck, commented that the relationship between a conductor and an orchestra is difficult to explain: "Some conductors get along with some orchestras and not others. We had a good match with Solti and he with us." Peck's colleague, violinist Victor Aitay, said, "Usually conductors are relaxed at rehearsals and tense at the concerts. Solti is the reverse. He is very tense at rehearsals, which makes us concentrate, but relaxed during the performance, which is a great asset to the orchestra." Peck recalled Solti's constant efforts to improve his own technique and interpretations, at one point experimentally dispensing with a baton, drawing a "darker and deeper, much more relaxed" tone from the players.

It's a marvelous thing to be musically happily married. ... I am and I know. I'm a romantic type of musician, and this is a romantic orchestra. That is our secret...

— Sir Georg Solti (1973)

As well as raising the orchestra's profile and helping it return to prosperity, Solti considerably expanded its repertoire. Under him, the Chicago Symphony gave its first cycles of the symphonies of Bruckner and Mahler. He introduced new works commissioned for the orchestra, such as Lutosławski's Third Symphony, and Tippett's Fourth Symphony, which was dedicated to Solti. Another new work was Tippett's Byzantium, an orchestral song-cycle, premiered by Solti and the orchestra with soprano Faye Robinson. Solti frequently programmed works by American composers, including Charles Ives and Elliott Carter.

Solti's recordings with the Chicago Symphony included the complete symphonies of Beethoven, Brahms, Bruckner, and Mahler. Most of his operatic recordings were with other orchestras, but his recordings of Wagner's Der fliegende Holländer (1976), Beethoven's Fidelio (1979), Schoenberg's Moses und Aron (1984) and his second recordings of Die Meistersinger (1995) and Verdi's Otello (1991) were made with the Chicago players.

After relinquishing the position of music director in 1991, Solti continued to conduct the orchestra, and was given the title of music director laureate. He conducted 999 concerts with the orchestra. His 1,000th concert was scheduled for October 1997, around the time of his 85th birthday, but Solti died that September.

=== Later years ===
In addition to his tenure in Chicago, Solti was music director of the Orchestre de Paris from 1972 to 1975. From 1979 until 1983, he was also principal conductor of the London Philharmonic Orchestra. He continued to expand his repertoire. With the London Philharmonic, he performed many of Elgar's major works in concert and on record. Before performing Elgar's two symphonies, Solti studied the composer's own recordings made more than 40 years earlier, and was influenced by their brisk tempi and impetuous manner. Edward Greenfield, music critic for The Guardian, wrote that Solti "conveys the authentic frisson of the great Elgarian moment more vividly than ever before on record." Late in his career he became enthusiastic about the music of Shostakovich, whom he admitted he failed to appreciate fully during the composer's lifetime. He made commercial recordings of seven of Shostakovich's fifteen symphonies. (Note: His commercial recordings of Shostakovich symphonies were Nos. 1, 5, 8, 9, 10, 13 and 15.)

His podium personality, exuberant and forceful, was clearly imprinted upon his music-making as he snarled and ferociously stabbed his baton. ... It became a cliché to say he mellowed as he got older, but his performances remained thrilling right to the end.

— Grove Dictionary of Music and Musicians

In 1983, Solti conducted for the only time at the Bayreuth Festival. By this stage in his career, he no longer liked abstract productions of Wagner, or modernistic reinterpretations, such as Patrice Chéreau's 1976 Bayreuth Centenary Ring, which he found grew boring on repetition. Together with the director Sir Peter Hall and designer William Dudley, he presented a Ring cycle that aimed to represent Wagner's intentions. The production was not well received by German critics, who expected radical reinterpretation of the operas. Solti's conducting was praised, but illnesses and last-minute replacements of leading performers affected the standard of singing. He was invited to return to Bayreuth for the following season, but was unwell and withdrew on medical advice before the 1984 festival began.

In 1991, Solti collaborated with actor and composer Dudley Moore to create an eight-part television series, Orchestra!, which was designed to introduce audiences to the symphony orchestra. In 1994, he directed the "Solti Orchestral Project" at Carnegie Hall, a training workshop for young American musicians. The following year, to mark the 50th anniversary of the United Nations, he formed the World Orchestra for Peace, which consisted of 81 musicians from 40 nations. The orchestra has continued to perform after his death, under the conductorship of Valery Gergiev.

Solti regularly returned to Covent Garden as a guest conductor in the years after he relinquished the musical directorship, greeted with "an increasingly boisterous hero's welcome" (Grove). From 1972 to 1997, he conducted 10 operas, some of them in several seasons. Five were operas he had not conducted at the Royal Opera House before: Bizet's Carmen, Wagner's Parsifal, Mozart's Die Entführung aus dem Serail, Verdi's Simon Boccanegra, and a celebrated production of La traviata (1994), which propelled Angela Gheorghiu to stardom. On 14 July 1997 he conducted the last operatic music to be heard in the old house before it closed for more than two years for rebuilding. (Note: Solti conducted the finale of Falstaff, with the singers led by Bryn Terfel, in a joint opera and ballet farewell. His successors, Sir Colin Davis and Bernard Haitink also conducted at this gala.) The previous day he had conducted what proved to be his last symphony concert. The work was Mahler's Fifth Symphony; the orchestra was the Zurich Tonhalle, with whom he had made his first orchestral recording 50 years earlier.

Solti died suddenly, in his sleep, on 5 September 1997 while on holiday in Antibes in the south of France. He was 84. After a state ceremony in Budapest, his ashes were interred beside the remains of Bartók in Farkasréti Cemetery.

== Recordings ==
Solti recorded throughout his career for the Decca Record Company. He made more than 250 recordings, including 45 complete opera sets. During the 1950s and 1960s, Decca had an alliance with RCA Victor, and some of Solti's recordings were first issued on the RCA label.

Solti was one of the first conductors who came to international fame as a recording artist before being widely known in the concert hall or opera house. Gordon Parry, the Decca engineer who worked with Solti and Culshaw on the Ring recordings, observed, "Many people have said 'Oh well, of course John Culshaw made Solti.' This is not true. He gave him the opportunity to show what he could do."

Solti's first recordings were as a piano accompanist, playing at sessions in Zurich for violinist Georg Kulenkampff in 1947. Decca's senior producer, Victor Olof did not much admire Solti as a conductor (nor did Walter Legge, Olof's opposite number at EMI's Columbia Records), but Olof's younger colleague and successor, Culshaw, held Solti in high regard. As Culshaw, and later James Walker, produced his recordings, Solti's career as a recording artist flourished from the mid-1950s. Among the orchestras with whom Solti recorded were the Berlin Philharmonic, Chicago Symphony, London Philharmonic, London Symphony and Vienna Philharmonic orchestras. Soloists in his operatic recordings included Birgit Nilsson, Joan Sutherland, Régine Crespin, Plácido Domingo, Gottlob Frick, Carlo Bergonzi, Kiri Te Kanawa, Ben Heppner and José van Dam. In concerto recordings, Solti conducted for, among others, András Schiff, Julius Katchen, Clifford Curzon, Vladimir Ashkenazy, and Kyung-wha Chung.

Solti's most celebrated recording was Wagner's Der Ring des Nibelungen made in Vienna, produced by Culshaw, between 1958 and 1965. It has twice been voted the greatest recording ever made, the first poll being among readers of Gramophone magazine in 1999, and the second of professional music critics in 2011, for the BBC's Music Magazine. A brief excerpt taken from this recording is heard in the film Apocalypse Now during the helicopter attack scene.

== Honours and memorials ==
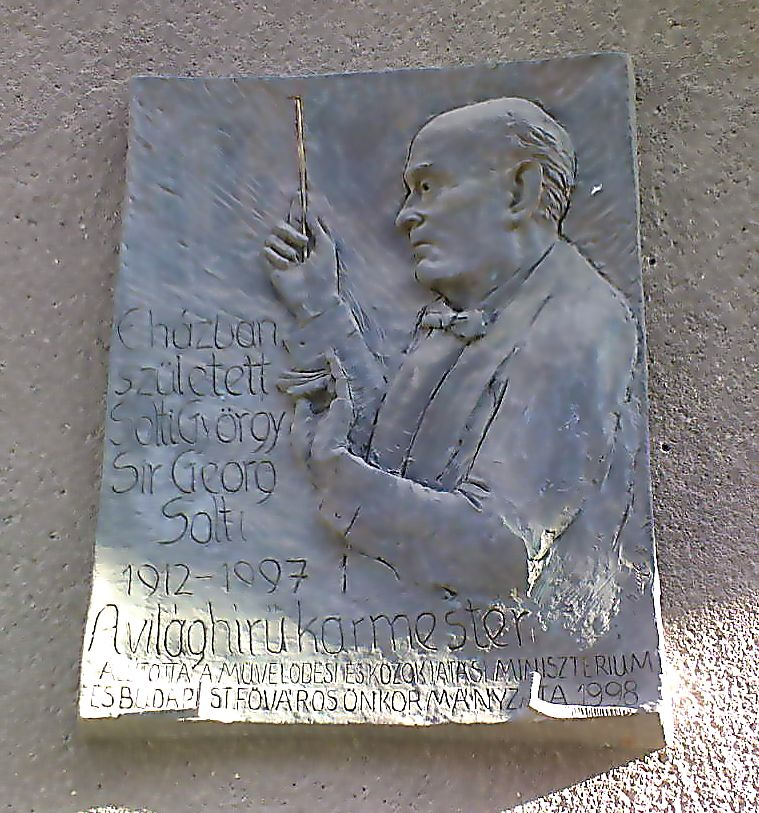
Commemorative plaque on the Maros utca building where Solti was born, Budapest

Honours awarded to Solti included the British CBE (honorary), 1968, and an honorary knighthood (KBE), 1971, which became a substantive knighthood when he took British citizenship in 1972, after which he was known as Sir Georg Solti. He was also awarded honorary citizenship from the coastal town of Castiglione della Pescaia, in Tuscany, a holiday destination particularly frequented by celebrities where he owned a holiday house and used to spend the summer holidays with his wife and daughters. In Castiglione, the Georg Solti Accademia and the main piazza within the town's historic hamlet are named after Solti. Furthermore, Solti received a number of honours from Austria, Belgium, Denmark, France, Germany, Hungary, Italy, Portugal and the US. (Note: The international honours included the Médaille de Vermeil de la Ville de Paris, 1985; Loyola-Mellon Humanities Award, 1987; Medal of Merit, City of Chicago, 1987; Order of the Flag (Hungary), 1987; Gold Medal of the Royal Philharmonic Society, 1989; Frankfurt Music Prize, 1992; Léonie Sonning Music Prize, 1992; Kennedy Center Award, 1993; Hans Richter Medal, Vienna Philharmonic Orchestra, 1993; Von Bülow Medal, Berlin Philharmonic Orchestra, 1993; Commander, Order of Leopold (Belgium), 1993; Middle Cross, Order of Merit with Star (Hungary), 1993; Grosses Verdienstkreuz mit Stern und Schulterband (Germany), 1993; Ordem Militar de Sant'Iago da Espada (Portugal), 1994; Commandeur, Ordre des Arts et des Lettres (France), 1995; and Knight Grand Cross, Order of Merit of the Italian Republic, 1996.) He received honorary fellowships or degrees from the Royal College of Music and DePaul, Furman, Harvard, Leeds, London, Oxford, Surrey and Yale universities.

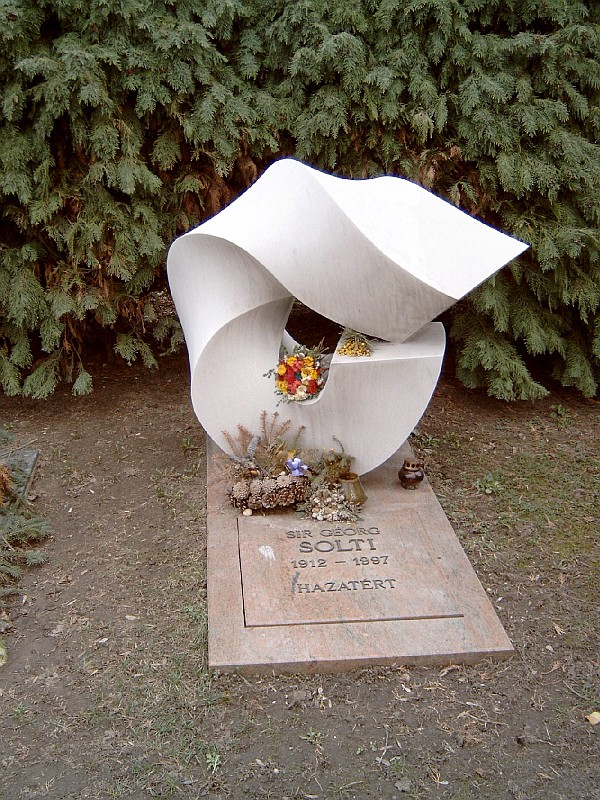
Solti's grave, Budapest

In celebration of his 75th birthday in 1987, a bronze bust of Solti by Dame Elisabeth Frink was dedicated in Lincoln Park, Chicago, outside the Lincoln Park Conservatory. It was first displayed temporarily at the Royal Opera House in London. The sculpture was moved to Grant Park in 2006 in a new Solti Garden, near Orchestra Hall in Symphony Center. In 1997, to commemorate the 85th anniversary of his birth, the City of Chicago renamed the block of East Adams Street adjacent to Symphony Center as "Sir Georg Solti Place" in his memory.

Record industry awards to Solti included the Grand Prix Mondial du Disque (14 times) and 31 Grammy Awards (besides a special Trustees' Grammy Award, shared with John Culshaw, for the recording of The Ring (1967) and a Grammy Lifetime Achievement Award (1996)). He held the record for most Grammy wins of all time, until Beyoncé tied and later beat the record in 2023. In September 2007, as a tribute on the 10th anniversary of his death, Decca published a recording of his final concert.

After Solti's death, his widow and daughters set up the Solti Foundation to assist young musicians. Solti's memoirs, written with the assistance of Harvey Sachs, were published the month after his death. Solti's life was also documented in a 1997 film by Peter Maniura, Sir Georg Solti: The Making of a Maestro.

In 2012, a series of events under the banner of "Solti @ 100" was announced, to mark the centenary of Solti's birth. Among the events were concerts in New York City and Chicago, and commemorative exhibitions in London, Chicago, Vienna, and New York City. In the same year, Solti was voted into the inaugural Gramophone "Hall of Fame".

The Sir Georg Solti International Conductors' Competition, which occurs every two years in Frankfurt, is named in his honour.

== Notes ==
Cultural offices
Preceded by Rafael Kubelík	Music Director, Royal Opera House, Covent Garden; 1961–1971	Succeeded by Colin Davis
