= Walter Kreppel =

German musician and singer (1923–2003)

Walter Kreppel (3 June 1923 – 18 October 2003) was a German bass singer, known for his performances in operatic roles in Europe and the US. Starting his career in his native Nuremberg he progressed to membership of major opera companies, including the Bavarian State Opera and the Vienna State Opera. Among his roles on record, the best known is Fasolt in the first published recording of Das Rheingold (1958).

== Life and career ==
Kreppel was born in Nuremberg on 3 June 1923. Attracted to the stage as a career, he studied singing at the Nuremberg Conservatory, making his debut in that city in 1945 as Tommaso in Eugen d'Albert's Tiefland. He remained with the Nuremberg company until 1948, continually adding roles to his repertoire. He progressed through the provincial German houses including Hanover (1953–1956) and Frankfurt-am-Main (1956–1959); he joined the Bavarian State Opera in Munich in 1959. During these years he began to build an international career, not only in the German repertoire but in roles including Bartolo in The Marriage of Figaro, King Philip in Don Carlos, Sparafucile in Rigoletto, Ramphis in Aida, Gremin in Eugene Onegin, and Arkel in Pelléas et Mélisande.

In 1960 Kreppel moved to Vienna, joining the State Opera, where he remained based until his retirement in 1973. He sang in a wide range of roles, the most frequent of which was Rocco in Fidelio. During this period he made guest appearances at Covent Garden (as Sarastro in Die Zauberflöte, conducted by Otto Klemperer, 1962), Bayreuth (Fasolt in Das Rheingold, conducted by Rudolf Kempe, 1962), Salzburg (Sarastro, conducted by István Kertész, 1963 and 1964) and San Francisco (Ramphis, Sparafucile, Hunding in Die Walküre, Padre Guardiano in La forza del destino, Hermann in Tannhäuser, 1963 and 1966). Other parts in his repertoire included Daland in Der fliegende Holländer, Pogner in Die Meistersinger and Gurnemanz in Parsifal.

In 1967 Kreppel sang the Commendatore in Don Giovanni when the Vienna company visited Montreal for Expo 67. The following year he appeared at the Deutsche Oper, Berlin as King Marke in Tristan und Isolde. Towards the end of his career he sang Wotan in Das Rheingold at Graz, in 1972, receiving excellent notices.

Kreppel died on 18 October 2003, aged 80.

=== Recordings ===
Kreppel features in several recordings, including Don Giovanni (conducted by Ferenc Fricsay), Martha (Wilhelm Schuchter), Tristan und Isolde (Horst Stein), Fidelio (Herbert von Karajan), Dalibor (Josef Krips), Der Freischütz (Eugen Jochum), La forza del destino (Dimitri Mitropoulos) and Aida (Lovro von Matačić), but in the view of Kreppel's obituarist in The Times, "the best and the best-known" is his Fasolt in Georg Solti's recording of Das Rheingold, made in Vienna in 1958.

== Sources ==
- Culshaw, John (1967). Ring Resounding. London: Secker & Warburg. ISBN 978-0-436-11800-5.
- Ross, Anne (1961). The Opera Directory. London and New York: John Calder and Sterling. OCLC 1036766466.
