= Walter Legge =

English music producer (1906–1979)

Walter Legge, c. 1960

Harry Walter Legge (1 June 1906 – 22 March 1979) was an English classical music record producer, most especially associated with EMI. His recordings include many sets later regarded as classics and reissued by EMI as "Great Recordings of the Century". He worked in the recording industry from 1927, combining this with the post of junior music critic of The Manchester Guardian. He was assistant to Sir Thomas Beecham at the Royal Opera House, Covent Garden, and in World War II played a role in bringing music to the armed forces and civilians.

After the war, Legge founded the Philharmonia Orchestra and worked for EMI as a recording producer. In the 1960s, he quarrelled with EMI and resigned. He attempted to disband the Philharmonia in 1964, but it continued as an independent body without him. After this he had no permanent job, and confined himself to giving masterclasses with, and supervising the recordings of, his second wife, Elisabeth Schwarzkopf.

== Life ==
=== Early years ===
Legge was born in Shepherd's Bush, London, where his father was a tailor. He was educated at the Latymer Upper School in Hammersmith. He excelled in Latin and French, but received no musical training. He left school at 16 and had no further formal education. Encouraged by his father he developed a taste for music, and Richard Wagner in particular, in pursuit of which he taught himself to read music and to speak German.

Legge first joined His Master's Voice in 1927, writing album and analytical notes and copy for the company's monthly retailing magazine, The Voice, but he caught the eye of the leading record producer, Fred Gaisberg, and was soon taking an active role in His Master's Voice recording procedures. Between 1933 and 1938, Legge also worked as a music critic for The Manchester Guardian.

In the pre-war years, Legge pioneered "subscription" recordings, by which the public were invited to pay in advance for their copies of future recordings, thus making it economically possible for EMI to make such "niche" but classic recordings as the songs of Hugo Wolf and the complete piano works of Beethoven (played by Artur Schnabel). Another pre-war recording supervised by Legge, which has been reissued on LP and CD, was Sir Thomas Beecham's set of The Magic Flute, made in Berlin in 1937. Beecham invited Legge to join him at the Opera as assistant artistic director. Given a free hand by Beecham he engaged Richard Tauber, Jussi Björling, Maria Reining, Hilde Konetzni, Julius Patzak and Helge Roswänge in their Covent Garden debuts.

During World War II, Legge's poor eyesight prevented him from serving in the armed forces. At Beecham's instigation he took on the musical side of ENSA, arranging concerts for British troops all over the world, and securing the services of musicians such as Solomon, Sir Adrian Boult and John Barbirolli. In 1941 Legge married the singer Nancy Evans; they divorced in 1948.

=== EMI and the Philharmonia ===
After the war Legge set to work to refresh EMI's catalogue and its roster of star performers. He set up his base in Vienna, then still occupied by the Allies, and contracted German and Austrian artists who were then seriously short of work. These performers included Josef Krips, Irmgard Seefried, Ljuba Welitsch, Hans Hotter, Ludwig Weber, Herbert von Karajan and Elisabeth Schwarzkopf (whom Legge married in 1953). Later he was among the first to spot the potential of Maria Callas, whose studio recordings he produced for EMI. The repertoire he chose to record was broad, though not extending much earlier than Handel and among modern composers concentrating on the approachable and diatonic. From the 1940s to the 1960s he supervised a long series of recordings of the works of William Walton.

Legge had promoted some Lieder recitals before the war, but in 1945, finding his influence at Covent Garden much diminished under the management of David Webster he again ventured into promoting concerts. For these, and for recordings, he founded a new orchestra, the Philharmonia. Beecham conducted its first concert (for the fee of one cigar) but was unwilling to be the employee of his former assistant and soon founded the Royal Philharmonic in competition with the Philharmonia. In its early years the Philharmonia became closely identified with Karajan, but when he turned his attentions to the Berlin Philharmonic, Legge worked more and more with Otto Klemperer, a prominent conductor in the 1920s and '30s whose career Legge revitalised. Other eminent musicians of the time whom Legge persuaded to conduct the Philharmonia were Wilhelm Furtwängler, Arturo Toscanini and Richard Strauss. At its peak in the 1950s the Philharmonia was widely rated as the finest British orchestra and one of the finest orchestras in the world. In 1964, concerned at what he saw as falling standards, Legge disbanded the orchestra, which at once re-formed as the New Philharmonia, without him but with Klemperer as chief conductor.

=== Last years ===
Legge's employer, EMI, tolerated his independent ways for many years, but in the 1960s attempts were made to curtail his freedom of choice of repertoire, and finally in 1964 he resigned. His memoirs, edited by Elisabeth Schwarzkopf and published in 1982, set out his disenchantment with EMI and its increasingly powerful internal committees:

I am convinced that in the arts, committees are useless. What is necessary are people like Karajan, Culshaw and me; we know not only how to achieve the best artistic results but how to attract the public and carry out the whole operation with carefully chosen collaborators. Democracy is fatal for the arts; it leads only to chaos or the achievement of new and lower common denominators of quality.

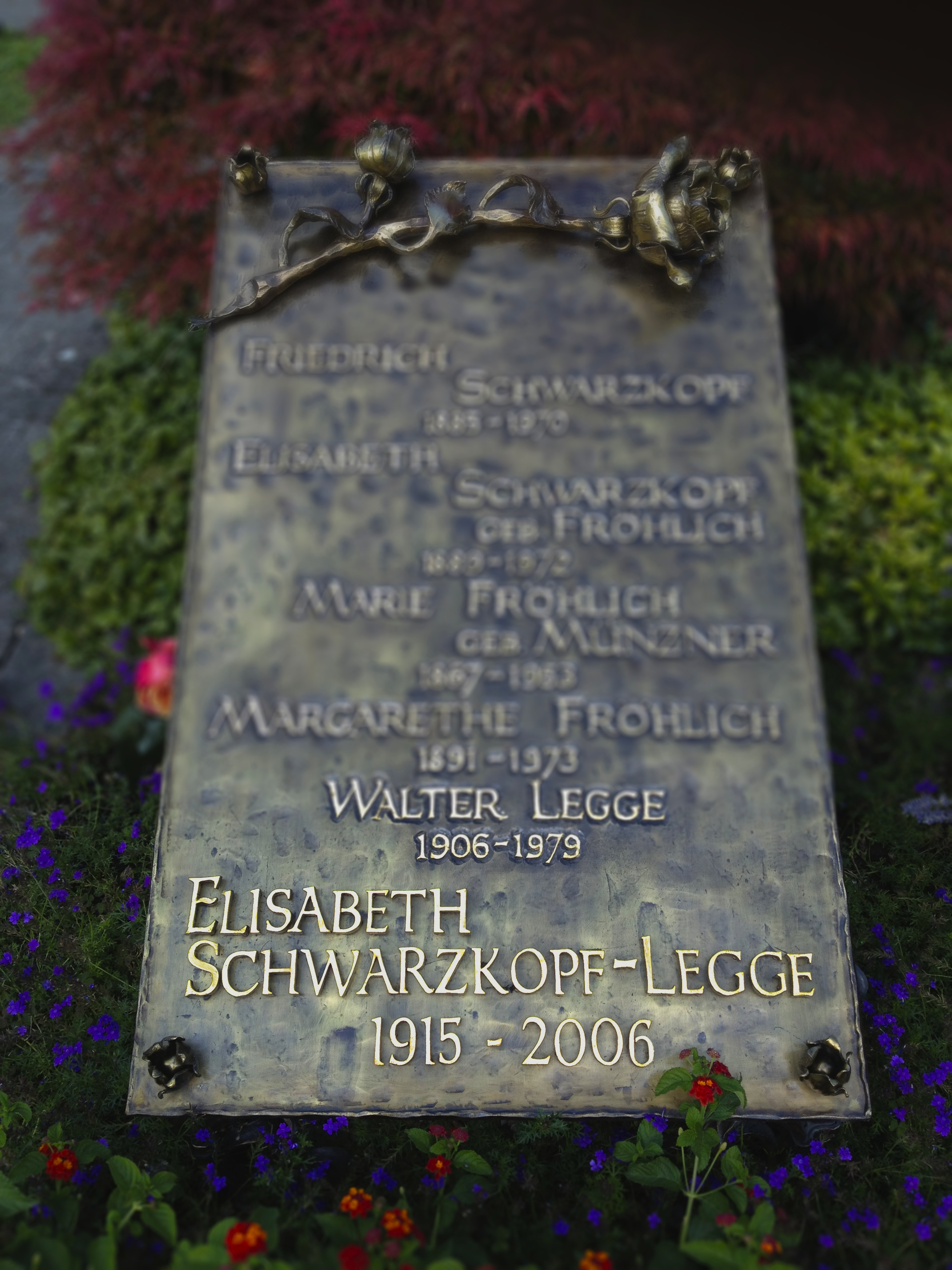
Grave in Zumikon

In retirement Legge, together with Schwarzkopf, gave many joint masterclasses for young singers but he failed to find a permanent job. He was offered, and accepted, the directorship of the Wexford Festival, but he suffered a disabling heart attack in 1967 before he could take up the post, and he withdrew. He continued to supervise the EMI recordings made by his wife, but the breach with the company was complete when in 1977 and 1979 he produced her last recordings not for EMI but for Decca, EMI's great rival.

Legge attended Schwarzkopf's final appearance, a recital at Zürich Opera House on 19 March 1979, despite having suffered a heart attack two days earlier. Three days after the recital, he died in Saint-Jean-Cap-Ferrat, France, at the age of 72. He was cremated, and his ashes were initially placed near those of Hugo Wolf in Vienna, as he had requested. After Elisabeth Schwarzkopf's death in 2006, their ashes were buried next to her parents in Zumikon near Zürich, where she had lived from 1982 to 2003.

== Musical legacy ==
Legge's artistic judgment was sometimes questioned. He was aesthetically conservative; he wrote to a friend, "If producers and scenic designers are allowed to continue their writing of graffiti and vulgarity and stupidity on masterpieces … not to mention Chéreau at Bayreuth – we shall be forced to insist that they write the libretto and music to match the rubbish they put on the stage!" Legge predicted to John Culshaw and Georg Solti that their Decca recording of Das Rheingold would not sell; it became a classical best-seller. He was responsible for three recordings of The Magic Flute, conducted by Beecham, Karajan and Klemperer, each of which has incurred the disapproval of critics for omitting the spoken dialogue. His recording of Fidelio under Klemperer has been compared unfavourably with Klemperer's contemporaneous live recording from Covent Garden, on the grounds that Legge's chosen singers were less effective than their ROH rivals. He was suspicious of stereo recording, and resisted it for as long as he could.

Nevertheless Legge's legacy is "a vast number of outstanding recordings that set standards unlikely ever to be surpassed". His recordings of The Dream of Gerontius (Sargent), Tristan und Isolde (Furtwängler), Tosca (De Sabata), Der Rosenkavalier and Falstaff (Karajan), Così fan tutte (Böhm) and the core German symphonic repertory (Klemperer, Furtwängler, Karajan…) have remained in the catalogue for decades, first on LP and then on CD.
