= John Culshaw =

Classical record producer from England

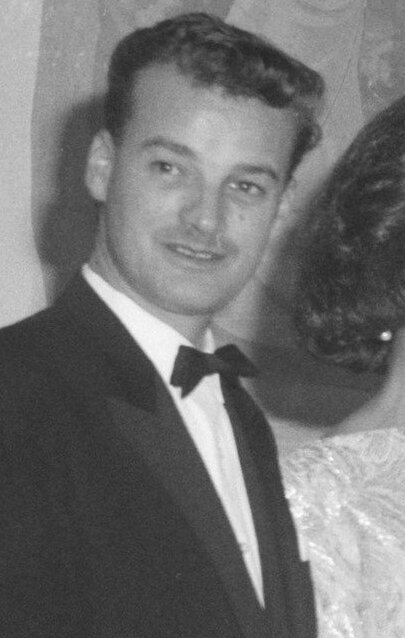
John Culshaw in 1963

John Royds Culshaw, OBE (28 May 1924 – 27 April 1980) was a pioneering English classical record producer for Decca Records. He produced a wide range of music, but is best known for masterminding the first studio recording of Wagner's Der Ring des Nibelungen, begun in 1958.

Largely self-educated musically, Culshaw worked for Decca from the age of 22, first writing album liner notes and then becoming a producer. After a brief period working for Capitol Records, Culshaw returned to Decca in 1955 and began planning to record the Ring cycle, employing the new stereophonic technique to produce recordings of unprecedented realism and impact. He disliked live recordings from opera houses, and sought to put on disc specially made studio recordings that would bring the operas fully to life in the listener's mind. In addition to his Wagner recordings, he supervised a series of recordings of the works of Benjamin Britten, with the composer as conductor or pianist, and recordings of operas by Verdi, Richard Strauss and others.

Culshaw left Decca in 1967 and was appointed head of music programmes for BBC Television, where he remained until 1975, employing a series of innovations to bring classical music to the television viewer. He later undertook several academic posts. He remains best remembered for his Decca records; along with Fred Gaisberg and Walter Legge, he was one of the most influential producers of classical recordings. The Times said of him that "he stood in that great tradition of propagandists from Henry Wood to Leonard Bernstein, who seek to bring their love and knowledge of music to the widest audience."

== Biography ==
=== Early years ===
Culshaw was born in Southport, Lancashire, one of at least two children of Percy Ellis Culshaw, a bank inspector, and his first wife, Dorothy née Royds. He was educated first at Merchant Taylors' School, Crosby, which he despised for its snobbery and its sports-obsessed philistinism. His father then sent him to King George V Grammar School, Southport. When he left school in 1940, aged 16, he followed his father into the staff of the Midland Bank as a clerk, working at a branch in Liverpool. He had little aptitude or liking for banking, failing to pass the company's examination in banking theory, and in 1941 he volunteered to join the Fleet Air Arm as soon as he reached the minimum recruitment age in May 1942. He trained as a navigator, was commissioned as an officer, and promoted to lieutenant as a radar instructor. What spare time he had, he devoted to his passionate interest in music.

Apart from piano lessons as a child, Culshaw was self-taught musically, and had no ambitions to be a performer. The critic and biographer Richard Osborne wrote of him, "Like many people for whom music is an obsession, Culshaw was a lonely and meticulous person, jealously guarding the sense of personal integrity which his precocious interest in music had helped form and deepen." While in the Fleet Air Arm, Culshaw "wrote articles on music by the dozen and – quite rightly – they came back by the dozen." After many rejections, his first substantial article to be accepted for publication was a piece on Sergei Rachmaninoff, for The Gramophone, published in March 1945. This led to invitations to broadcast musical talks for the BBC and to contribute articles to classical music magazines.

=== Decca ===
After demobilisation from the forces, Culshaw joined the Decca recording company in November 1946, writing musical analyses and biographies of recording artists for Decca's classical albums. His first book, a short biography of Rachmaninoff, was published in 1949 and was well received. The critic of The Times praised it for its discriminating judgment, conciseness and discretion. It was followed by two further books; a popular introduction to concertos (The Concerto in "The World of Music" series in 1949), and a guide to modern music (A Century of Music in 1952).

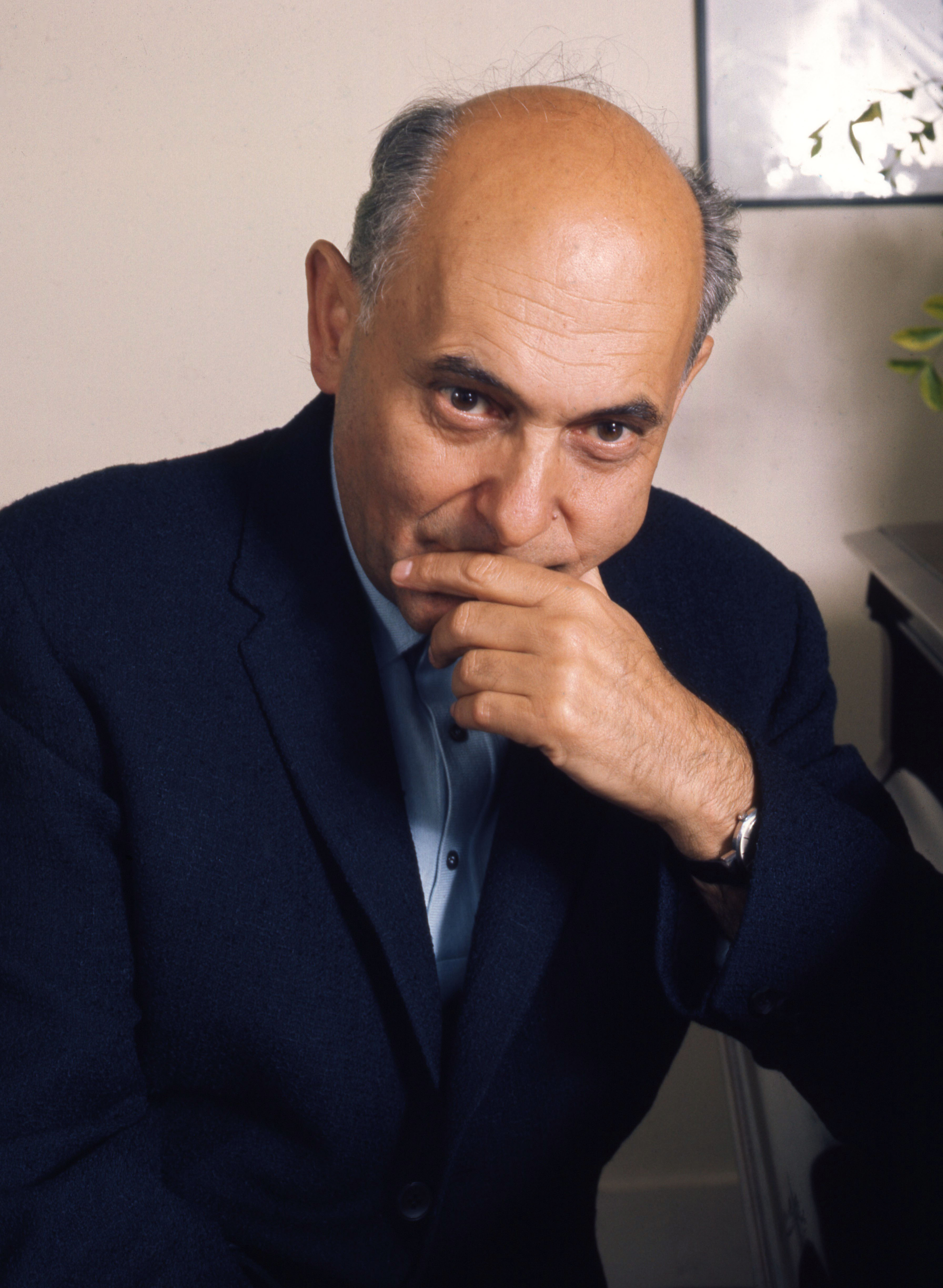
Georg Solti, conductor of the Decca Ring cycle

By 1947 Culshaw had been given the chance to produce classical sessions for Decca's rapidly expanding catalogue. At Decca, the musicians whom he recorded included Ida Haendel, Eileen Joyce, Kathleen Ferrier and Clifford Curzon. In 1948 he first worked with Georg Solti, a pianist and aspiring conductor. In 1950, after the introduction of the long-playing record (LP), he produced the first LP versions of the Savoy Operas with the D'Oyly Carte Opera Company.

In 1951, Culshaw and one of Decca's senior engineers, Kenneth Wilkinson, were sent to the Bayreuth Festival to record Wagner's Parsifal. For Culshaw, Wagner was an abiding passion, and he persuaded Decca and the Bayreuth management to let him record that year's Ring cycle in addition to Parsifal. The Ring recording could not be released, probably for contractual reasons. (Note: The recordings of the first three operas in the cycle were not successful, musically or technically, and have never been officially released. The Götterdämmerung recording was more successful and was finally released, in 1999, when Gramophone described it as "an experience from the opera house that nobody ought to miss.") The Parsifal recording, on the other hand, was released to great acclaim in 1952. (Note: Alec Robertson wrote in The Gramophone, "All concerned with this issue have done a magnificent piece of work, but my last word of praise must be for Hans Knappertsbusch whose superb musicianship and deep insight into the opera must have inspired the whole of the cast – in which there is not a weak member – and the orchestra to give of their best." In The Manchester Guardian, Andrew Porter wrote, "...the most moving and profound of spiritual experiences ... Decca have recorded, superbly, a superb performance".) The Decca team returned to Bayreuth to record the 1953 performances of Lohengrin. The resultant recording was well reviewed, (Note: Porter wrote of its "sumptuous, spacious sound" and "inspired and inspiring performance") but Culshaw wrote of it:

... the cast was only of moderate ability, and we had access to far too few performances to make up anything really worth while. It was still felt that this was the only economic way to record Wagner, for the expense involved in taking his major works to the studio did not seem to be justified by the sales potential. But after the Lohengrin experience I found myself fervently hoping that I would never return to Bayreuth, at least in a recording capacity.

=== Capitol ===
From 1953 to 1955 Culshaw headed the European programme for Capitol Records. As Capitol at that time had commercial ties with Decca, Culshaw's move did not estrange him from the head of Decca, Edward Lewis, who generally took a dim view when his employees left Decca to join its competitors. Culshaw found his attempts to build up a roster of classical artists for Capitol frustrated by bureaucracy at the company's headquarters in Los Angeles. He was prevented from encouraging the soprano Kirsten Flagstad to emerge from retirement, or from signing the conductor Otto Klemperer. The latter misjudgment, as Culshaw noted in his memoirs, was not repeated by Walter Legge of EMI, who signed Klemperer up with great artistic and commercial success. Capitol further frustrated Culshaw by ignoring the impending introduction of stereophony which the major companies were working on. Among the recordings Culshaw was able to make for Capitol were a Brahms Requiem conducted by Solti in Frankfurt, and what Peter Martland in the Oxford Dictionary of National Biography calls "a series of remarkable recordings of performances by Eduard van Beinum and the Concertgebouw Orchestra of Amsterdam."

In early 1955, Lewis warned Culshaw that he had heard rumours that Capitol was on the point of severing its ties with Decca. Within days it was announced that Capitol had been taken over by EMI. Capitol sessions already booked were completed, including two records of Jacques Ibert conducting his own works, but EMI made it clear that it would put an end to Capitol's classical activity, which was regarded as superfluous. Lewis invited Culshaw to rejoin Decca, which he did in the autumn of 1955.

=== Stereo and the Decca Ring ===
Finding on his return to Decca that other recording producers were capably filling his former role, Culshaw concentrated on the emerging stereophonic recording technology, and stereo opera in particular. A year after his return he was made manager of the company's classical recording division, a position of great influence in the classical music world. The Gramophone obituarist wrote of him in 1980: "To meet John Culshaw for the first time, quiet, charming, sharp-eyed but with no signs of aggressiveness about him, was to marvel that here was one of the two great dictators of recording art. If Walter Legge in a flash had one registering extrovert forcefulness in the very picture of a dictator, John Culshaw's comparable dominance was something to appreciate over a longer span. … [H]e transformed the whole concept of recording."

Culshaw hoped to record Die Walküre with Flagstad, whom he persuaded out of retirement, as Brünnhilde. Flagstad, however, was over sixty, and would not agree to sing the whole opera. To capture as much of her Wagner as she was willing to record, Culshaw produced separate sets of parts of the opera in 1957. Act 1 was conducted by Hans Knappertsbusch with Flagstad in the role of Sieglinde; in the other set the "Todesverkündigung" scene from Act 2 and the whole of Act 3 were conducted by Solti with Flagstad as Brünnhilde. In those early years of stereo, Culshaw worked with Pierre Monteux in recordings of Stravinsky and Ravel, and with Solti in a recording of Richard Strauss's Arabella. He also recorded the first of many New Year's Day concerts by the Vienna Philharmonic and Willi Boskovsky.

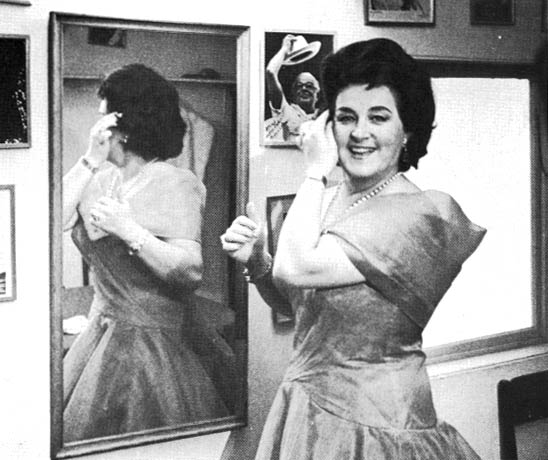
Birgit Nilsson, Culshaw's chosen Brünnhilde

By 1958 Decca, with its pre-eminent technical team (The Times called them "Decca's incomparable engineers") was in a position to embark on a complete studio recording of Wagner's Ring cycle. Decca decided to begin its cycle with Das Rheingold, the shortest of the four Ring operas. It was recorded in 1958 and released in the spring of 1959. Culshaw engaged Solti, the Vienna Philharmonic and a cast of established Wagner singers. The performance won enthusiastic praise from reviewers, and the engineers were generally acknowledged to have surpassed themselves. The Gramophone described the recording quality as "stupendous" and called the set "wonderful … surpass[ing] anything done before." To the astonishment and envy of Decca's rivals the set outsold popular music releases such as those of Elvis Presley and Pat Boone. The cast included Flagstad in one of her last recorded performances, in the role of Fricka, which she had never sung on stage. Culshaw hoped to record her as Fricka in Die Walküre and Waltraute in Götterdämmerung, but her health did not permit it. His cast for the remaining three Ring operas included Birgit Nilsson, Hans Hotter, Gottlob Frick, Wolfgang Windgassen, Dietrich Fischer-Dieskau and Régine Crespin, with even minor roles sung by such stars as Joan Sutherland.

In these productions Culshaw put into practice his belief that a properly-made sound recording should create what he called "a theatre of the mind". He disliked live recordings such as those attempted at Bayreuth; to him they were technically flawed and, crucially, were merely sound recordings of a theatrical performance. He sought to make recordings that compensated for the lack of the visual element by subtle production techniques, impossible in live recordings, that conjured up the action in the listener's head. (Note: Decca's marketing department promoted Culshaw's recording technique under the name "Sonic Stage")

Culshaw took unprecedented pains to meet Wagner's musical requirements. Where in Das Rheingold the score calls for eighteen anvils to be hammered during two brief orchestral interludes – an instruction never followed in opera houses (Note: Culshaw wrote, "Sometimes you get fobbed off with a sort of electronic compromise; sometimes you get a tinkling sound made by a few people beating metal bars together: but you never get the firm, frightening sound of eighteen anvils hit with rhythmical precision and building into a deafening assault on the nerves.") – Culshaw arranged for eighteen anvils to be hired and hammered. Similarly, where Wagner called for steerhorns, Culshaw arranged for them to be used instead of the trombones habitually substituted at Bayreuth and other opera houses. (Note: Bayreuth and Covent Garden had used steerhorns or similar instruments until World War II, but the instruments went missing during the war years and were not replaced.) In The Gramophone, Edward Greenfield wrote:

It was thanks to Culshaw's devotion to Wagnerian intentions – ever encouraged by the engineer who was at his right hand through the whole project, Gordon Parry, himself a devoted Wagnerian – that in the Solti Ring cycle one is able to hear the scores in a way literally impossible in the theatre. Siegfried's voice made to sound like Gunther's, the voice of Fafner from his cave, not to mention the splendour of anvils and rainbow bridge harps in Rheingold, all transcend what is heard in the opera-house.

In 1967, after the Decca Ring was complete, Culshaw wrote a memoir, Ring Resounding, about the making of the recording. (Note: Reviewing the book, Lord Harewood included Culshaw among "the great impresarios of musical history".) In 1999, Gramophone ran a poll of its readers to find "the ten greatest recordings ever made." The Decca Ring topped the poll.

=== Britten, Karajan and others ===
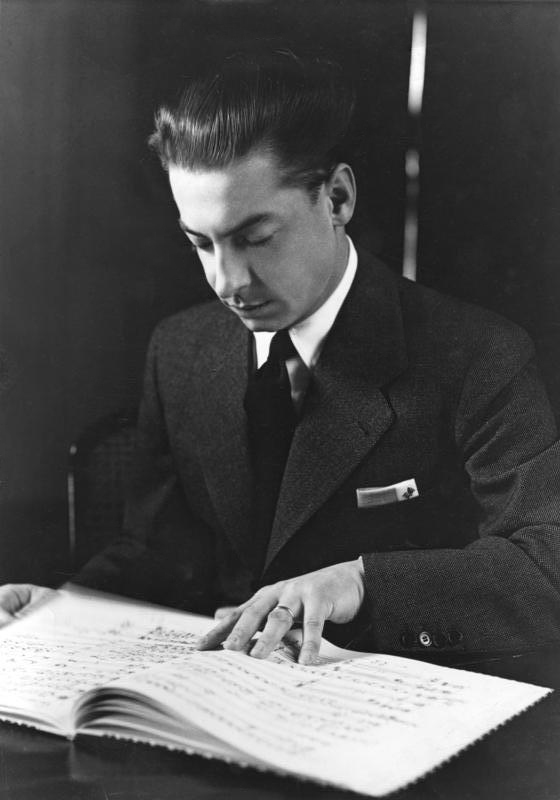
Herbert von Karajan recorded for Decca in the 1960s

Culshaw produced a series of Decca recordings of Britten's music with the composer as conductor or pianist. The Times described them as "a priceless heritage for posterity." Culshaw persuaded Decca to make the first complete recording of Peter Grimes, arguing that unless they did so they should abandon their exclusive agreement with the composer and so "give him a chance to try his luck with other companies". Decca, unwilling to lose out to competition, gave the go-ahead. Culshaw, who was then responsible for recordings in Vienna, was unavailable to produce that pioneering recording, which was also the first modern opera to be recorded in stereo: instead, he "planned it down to the last detail", and passed his detailed instructions to Erik Smith, who produced the recording. Among the works Culshaw himself recorded with Britten were the operas Albert Herring (1964), A Midsummer Night's Dream (1967), and Billy Budd (1968). Culshaw wrote, "The happiest hours I have spent in any studio were with Ben, for the basic reason that it did not seem that we were trying to make records or video tapes; we were just trying to make music."

Culshaw thought of all his recordings, that of Britten's War Requiem was the finest. Greenfield says of it, "another recording which confounded the record world not just by its technical brilliance but by the way it sold in huge quantities." The recording was made in London in 1963, the year after the premiere of the Requiem at the consecration of the new Coventry Cathedral. For the recording Culshaw managed to assemble the three singers whom Britten had in mind when writing the work, uniting Russian, German and English soloists to represent the former enemy nations – Galina Vishnevskaya, Dietrich Fischer-Dieskau and Peter Pears.

One composer Culshaw had nothing to do with was Mahler. He had a strong aversion to Mahler's music, writing that it made him feel sick: "not metaphorically but physically sick. I find his strainings and heavings, juxtaposed with what always sounds (to me) like faux-naif music of the most calculated type, downright repulsive".

Culshaw produced many of the conductor Herbert von Karajan's best-known operatic and orchestral sets, which remain in the catalogues six decades later. The opera sets include Tosca, Carmen, Aida, Die Fledermaus and Otello; among the orchestral sets were Holst's The Planets and several Richard Strauss works including the then rarely heard Also sprach Zarathustra.

In the late 1950s Decca entered into a commercial partnership with RCA, by which Decca teams recorded classical works in European venues on RCA's behalf. Among the recordings supervised by Culshaw for RCA were Sir Thomas Beecham's lavishly re-orchestrated version of Handel's Messiah. Other artists with whom he worked for Decca and RCA included pianists such as Wilhelm Backhaus, Arthur Rubinstein and Julius Katchen; conductors including Karl Böhm, Sir Adrian Boult, Pierre Monteux, Fritz Reiner, and George Szell; and singers such as Carlo Bergonzi, Jussi Björling, Lisa Della Casa, Leontyne Price, and Renata Tebaldi.

== Later years ==
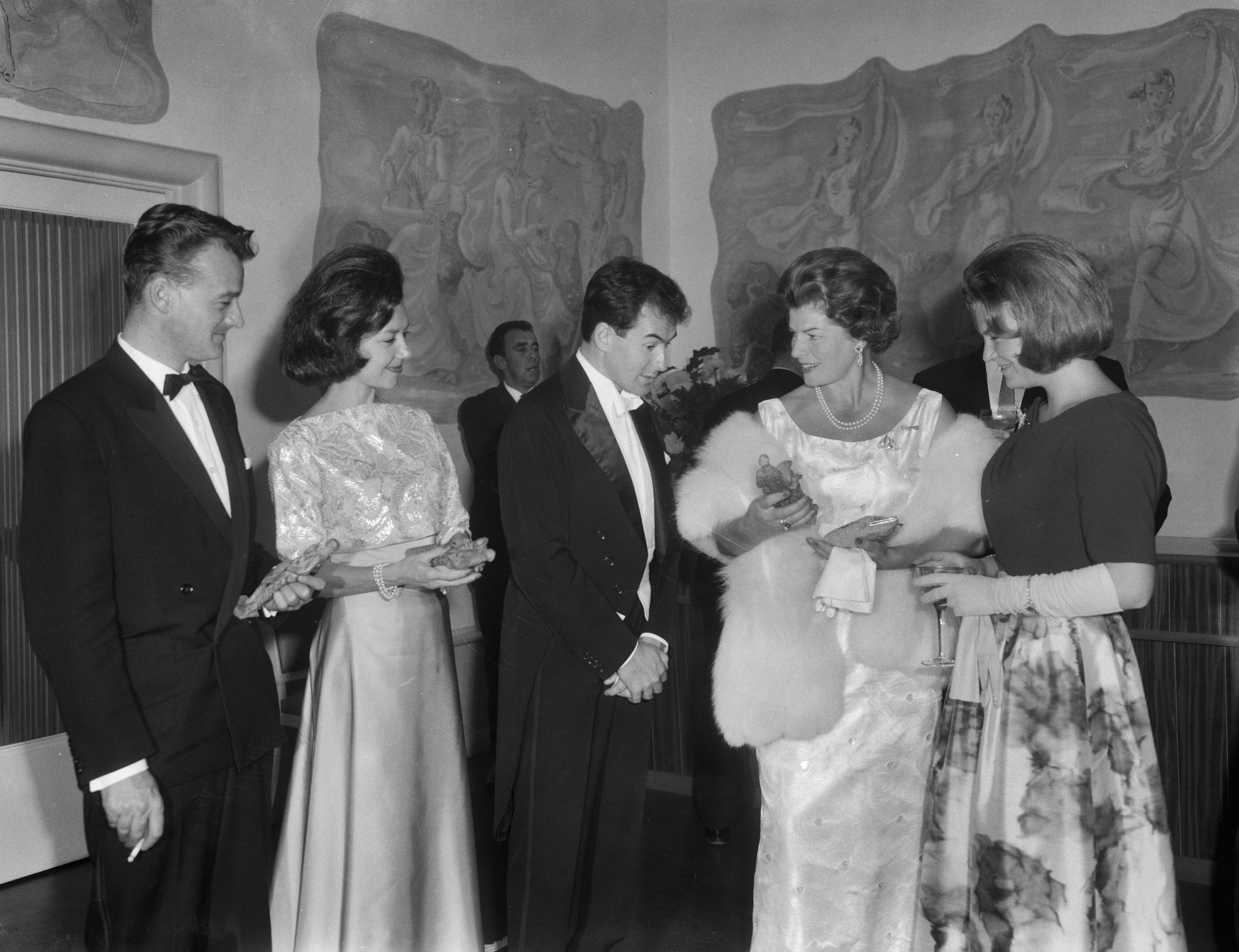
Culshaw (left) in the Netherlands in 1963

By 1967 Culshaw wished for a change. He was growing disenchanted with the top management of Decca, which he believed had lost its pioneering enthusiasm. He moved from the record industry to become BBC Television's head of music programmes. He inaugurated, and supervised several series of, André Previn's Music Night, in which Previn would talk informally direct to camera and then turn and conduct the London Symphony Orchestra (LSO), whose members were dressed not in evening clothes but in casual sweaters or shirts. The programme attracted unprecedented viewing figures for classical music; an historian of the orchestra wrote, "More British people heard the LSO play in Music Night in one week than in sixty-five years of LSO concerts." Culshaw also screened more formal concerts, including Klemperer's 1970 Beethoven symphony cycle from the Royal Festival Hall. In 1973 he sought to arrange for BBC television to broadcast a complete performance of Wagner's Siegfried conducted by Reginald Goodall, but the project never happened. In 1974 Verdi's Un ballo in maschera was broadcast from Covent Garden. Culshaw also set up BBC studio productions of The Marriage of Figaro, The Yeomen of the Guard, The Flying Dutchman and La traviata.

Culshaw commissioned Britten's opera Owen Wingrave, written expressly for television. He also persuaded Britten to conduct television productions of Peter Grimes and Mozart's Idomeneo, and to accompany Pears in Schubert's Winterreise. Britten and Pears invited him to Snape, not far from their base at Aldeburgh in Suffolk and he encouraged them to transform Snape Maltings into a concert-hall. He later initiated the Benson and Hedges music festival at Snape and was planning the fourth season at the time of his death. Some of his BBC programmes have been preserved on DVD, including films of the Amadeus Quartet playing works by Schubert and Britten. He took time off from the BBC to return to the recording studio, rejoining his old Decca engineering team in 1971 to produce Der Rosenkavalier, conducted by Leonard Bernstein.

In 1975, Culshaw left the BBC and worked freelance as a record and stage producer, writer and broadcaster. He was invited to serve on the Arts Council of Great Britain in 1975 and was chairman of its music panel from 1975 to 1977. In 1977 he became a senior fellow in the creative arts at the University of Western Australia, and was visiting professor at the University of Houston, the University of Southern California and the University of Melbourne. He also took on the responsibility for the annual United Nations concert in New York, and acted as a music consultant to the Australian Broadcasting Commission. He frequently served as a commentator for broadcasts of Metropolitan Opera performances, and his 1976 book, Reflections on Wagner's "Ring", was based on the series of interval talks he gave during the broadcasts of the Met's Ring cycle in 1975.

Culshaw died in London in 1980, at the age of 55, from a rare form of hepatitis. He was unmarried. His unfinished autobiography, Putting the Record Straight, was published after his death.

Among the honours given to Culshaw, The Times listed "eight Grands Prix des Disques, numerous Grammys and in 1966 an OBE", and the Vienna Philharmonic's Nicolai Medal in 1959 and its Schalk Medal in 1967.

== Publications ==
A lesser-known part of Culshaw's work was writing fiction. He published two novels in the early 1950s; the first, The Sons of Brutus (1950) had been inspired by what he had seen during trips to ruined German cities in the aftermath of the war. (Note: The reviewer in The Times Literary Supplement, commented, "There are some vivid glimpses of action here and there … but the reader is left with the impression that the author has found the peculiar spiritual and material squalor, the hopeless disorganization of life in Germany during the early occupation period, rather too much for him." Culshaw himself later observed, "as a political thriller it was short on thrills and naïve on politics.") It was chosen by The Observer as one of its books of the year in 1950. At the time of its publication he was working on a second novel. He gave it the title A Harder Thing, but was persuaded by his publisher to change it to A Place of Stone. It was published in 1951.

Culshaw's musical books were: Sergei Rachmaninov, 1948; The Concerto, 1949; A Century of Music, 1951; Ring Resounding: The Recording of Der Ring des Nibelungen, 1967; Reflections on Wagner's "Ring", 1976; Wagner: The Man and His Music, 1978; and Putting the Record Straight: The Autobiography of John Culshaw, 1981.

== Notes and references ==
Notes

== Bibliography ==
- Culshaw, John (1967). Ring Resounding. London: Secker & Warburg. ISBN 0-436-11800-9.
- Culshaw, John (1976). Reflections on Wagner's Ring. London: Secker & Warburg. ISBN 0-670-59301-X.
- Culshaw, John (1981). Putting the Record Straight. London: Secker & Warburg. ISBN 0-436-11802-5.
- Morrison, Richard (2004). Orchestra – The LSO: A Century of Triumph and Turbulence. London: Faber and Faber. ISBN 0-571-21584-X.
- Osborne, Richard (1998). Herbert von Karajan. London: Chatto and Windus. ISBN 1-85619-763-8.
