= Vera Schlosser =

Vera Schlosser (25 July 1929 – 22 November 2018) was a German operatic soprano. She made her career in Germany and Switzerland, with guest appearances at opera houses in Italy, including La Scala, Milan.

== Life and career ==
Schlosser was born on 25 July 1929 in Karlovy Vary. She studied in Regensburg, Munich and Wiesbaden. She joined the opera company at the Theater Regensburg (1947–1953), first as a member of the chorus and then in small roles. In 1951 she sang in the chorus at the Bayreuth Festival. From there she moved to the Hessisches Staatstheater, Wiesbaden (1953–1957); and the Stadttheater/Opernhaus, Zürich (1957–1969). She made numerous guest appearances at other opera houses, including those in Basel, Bologna, Düsseldorf, Frankfurt, Hamburg, Lisbon, Milan (La Scala), Munich (Bayerische Staatsoper), Rome (Teatro dell'Opera), and Stuttgart.

Schlosser's obituarist in the Neue Zürcher Zeitung wrote, "She was one of the public's favourites ... The breadth of her repertoire ranged from roles for lyrical coloratura soprano to youthful-dramatic roles". The list of her roles given in Paul Suter's Sängerlexikon – detailing singers from 1900 to 1989 – ranges from operetta to Wagnerian epic, from Gluck and Handel opera to modern works. Her operetta roles included Laura in Der Bettelstudent, Saffi in Der Zigeunerbaron and Kurfürstin Marie in Der Vogelhändler. Her Wagner roles included Eva in Die Meistersinger, Elsa in Lohengrin and Wellgunde, Gerhilde and Siegrune in The Ring. In the French repertoire her parts included Micaëla in Carmen, the title role in Manon, and Antonia, Giulietta and Stella in The Tales of Hoffmann. As a Mozartian her roles included Fiordiligi in Così fan tutte, Pamina in The Magic Flute, Zerlina and Donna Elvira in Don Giovanni and, in The Marriage of Figaro, Cherubino, Susanna and the Countess at various times. Her only regular Verdi role was Desdemona in Otello; her Puccini repertoire was larger, and included Mimi in La bohème, Lauretta in Gianni Schicchi, Liù in Turandot, and the title roles in Manon Lescaut and Madama Butterfly. Schlosser made her last stage appearance playing Elsa in 1970. After her retirement from the opera house she taught, at the Cantonal Baccalaureate School for Adults in Zürich and took private pupils. She died, aged 90, on 22 November 2018.

== Sources ==
- Suter, Paul (1989). Sängerlexikon: Sängerinnen und Sänger in der Schweiz von 1900 bis heute. Zürich: Atlantis. ISBN 978-3-254-00154-2.
