= Claire Watson =

American singer

Claire Watson (née McLamore) (February 3, 1927 – July 16, 1986) was an American operatic soprano, particularly associated with Mozart and Richard Strauss roles.

Born in New York City, she studied at the Eastman School of Music in Rochester, and later privately with Elisabeth Schumann and Sergius Kagen, in New York. She then left for Europe, where she studied in Vienna with Otto Klemperer. She made her stage debut in Graz, as Desdemona, in 1951.

She was engaged by the Frankfurt Opera in 1955, where she sang a wide range of roles, notably: Countess Almaviva, Pamina, Elisabeth, Leonora, Aida, Tatyana, Fiordiligi, Elisabeth de Valois, and the Die Marschallin, in which role she made her debut at the Royal Opera House in London in 1958, and at the Glyndebourne Festival in 1960.

In 1958, she became a member of the Bavarian State Opera in Munich, where she sang as Eva and Sieglinde. She also made regular guest appearances in Berlin, Vienna, Salzburg, Milan, also appearing in America, notably in San Francisco, Chicago, and Buenos Aires. In 1971, Watson performed in Boston for the Peabody Mason Concert series.

Considered a singer of warmth, musicality and sincerity, Watson was also portrayed Ariadne, the Countess in Capriccio, and Ellen Orford in Peter Grimes, of which she left a recording conducted by Benjamin Britten.

She can also be heard on other recordings: as Agathe in Der Freischütz, under Lovro von Matačić, as Donna Anna in Don Giovanni, opposite Nicolai Ghiaurov and Nicolai Gedda, under Otto Klemperer, as well as Eva in a live recording of Die Meistersinger von Nürnberg, under Joseph Keilberth. She is both Freia and Gutrune in the landmark Decca/London Ring conducted by Solti. She also sang the Countess in the famous Karl Bohm DVD recording of Le Nozze di Figaro from the Salzburg Festival of 1966 with Ingvar Wixell, Reri Grist, Walter Berry and Edith Mathis.

Watson died of a brain tumor in 1986 in Utting, Ammersee, Germany.

== Videography ==
- Strauss: Ariadne auf Naxos [original version] (Sills, Nagy; Leinsdorf, 1969) [live Concert Version] VAI

== Sources ==
- Grove Music Online, Harold Rosenthal, Alan Blyth, Oxford University Press, 2008.
