= Kinderkatechismus =

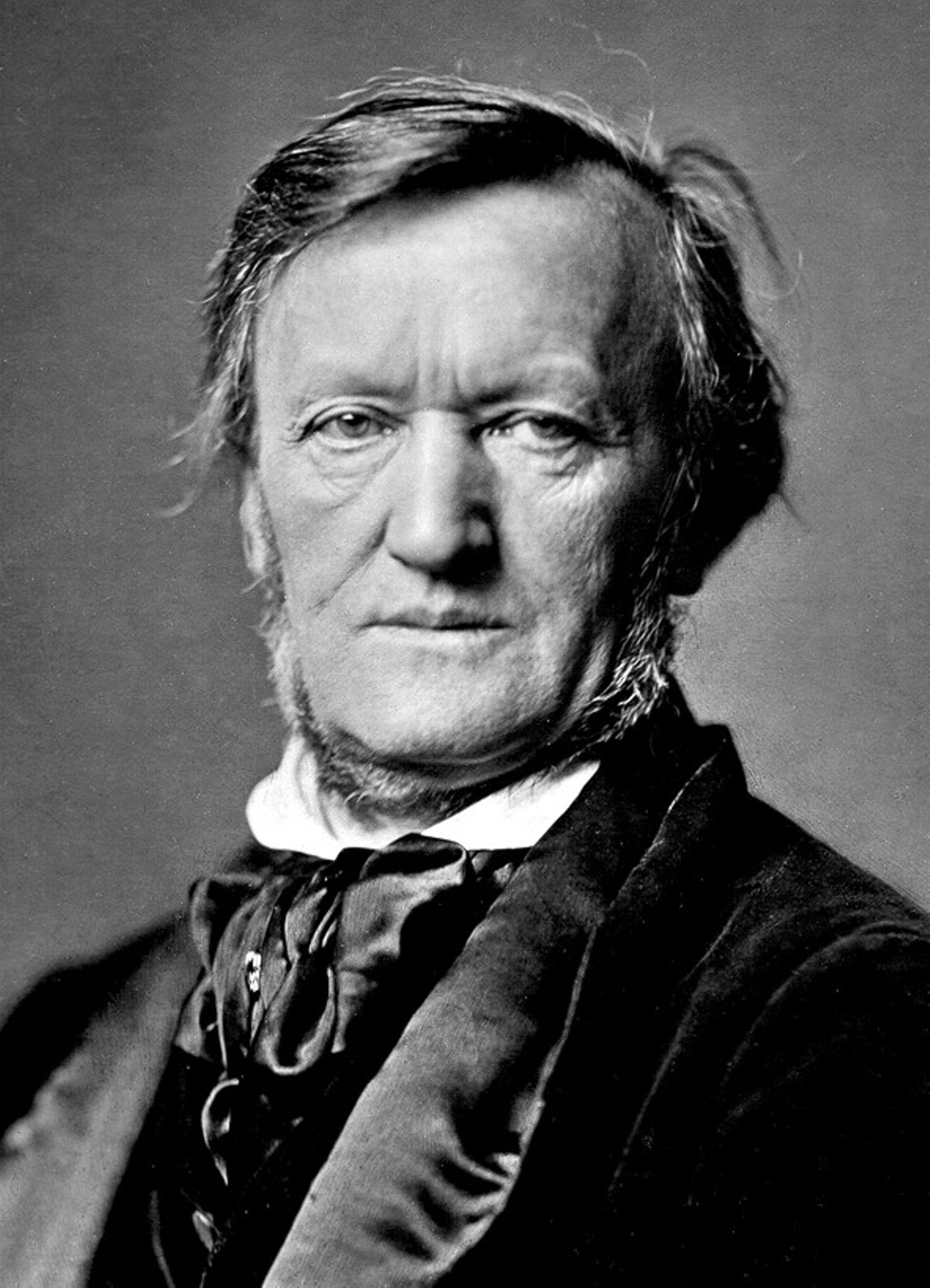
Richard Wagner in 1871

Kinderkatechismus (Children's Catechism) is an 1873 composition by Richard Wagner, originally for voices and piano and later for voices and small orchestra. Written to celebrate his wife's birthday it was sung to her by her young children.

== Background and first performance ==
Richard Wagner, by now an established but not yet financially secure composer, wrote a short piece for small orchestra, the Siegfried Idyll in 1870. It was written to celebrate the birthday of his wife, Cosima and was played to her on 25 December, the day after her birthday, at the family's house at Tribschen, near Lake Lucerne by a small group of players conducted by the composer. It was not intended for public performance, and the Wagners were dismayed when from financial necessity the manuscript was sold for publication in 1877 along with that of Kinderkatechismus. The latter was written in 1873 and performed with piano accompaniment at the Wagners' house during Christmas of that year.

In November 1874 Wagner completed his epic tetralogy Der Ring des Nibelungen (The Nibelung's Ring). Shortly after doing so he greatly upset Cosima by quarrelling with her; the Wagner scholar Deryck Cooke writes that the finished, orchestrated version of Kinderkatechismus was almost certainly a peace-offering for her birthday that Christmas.

The full title is Kinderkatechismus zu Kosel's Geburtstag (Children's Catechism for Kosel's Birthday) – "Kosel" being Cosima's pet-name among the family).

== Words and music ==
As he had done for The Ring, Wagner wrote his own words for the piece. A solo voice asks Sagt mir, Kinder, was blüht am Maitag? (Tell me, children, what blossoms on May Day?) to which the children reply Die Rose, die Rose, die Ros' im Mai (The rose, the rose, the rose in May). The solo voice then asks, Kinder, wisst ihr auch, was blüht in der Weihnacht? (Children, do you also know what blossoms at Christmas?) to which they answer Die kose–, die kose–, die kosende Mama, die Cosima! (The cosy, the cosy, the cosy mama, Cosima!)

The first part of the two-and-a-half minute piece focuses on the children's voices. As the piece nears its conclusion Wagner introduces an orchestral quotation of the "Redemption motive" – the gentle musical theme that closes The Ring – here signifying, in Cooke's analysis, the composer making his peace with his wife.

== Sources ==
- Anderson, Robert (1980). Wagner: A Biography. London and Hamden: Bingley and Linnet Books. ISBN 978-0-20-801677-5.
