= Steerhorn =

Medieval bugle horn

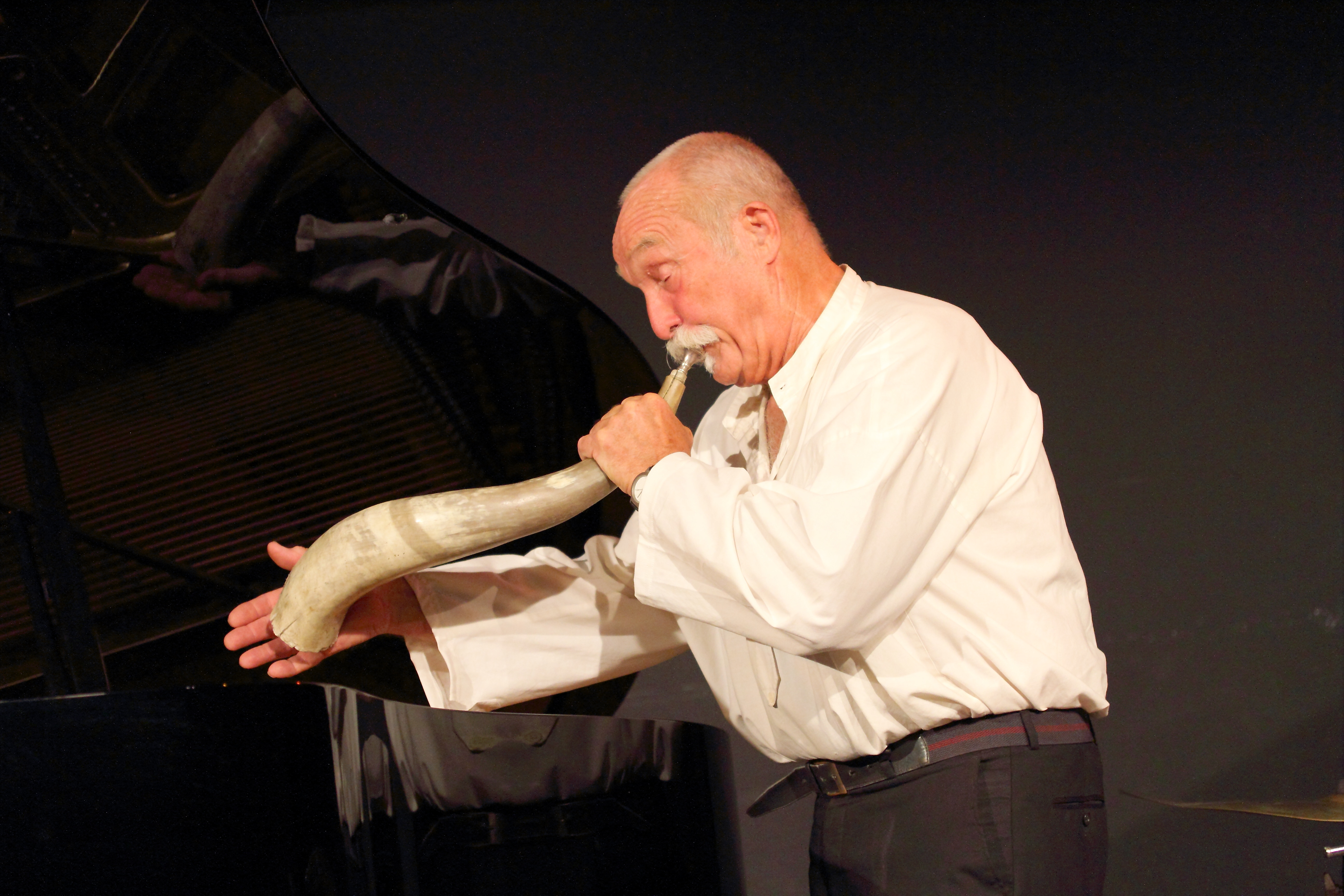
German musician Günter Sommer playing a steerhorn, or possibly cowhorn, bullhorn or oxhorn.

The steerhorn (German: stierhorn, also known in English as a cowhorn or bullhorn) is an extremely long medieval bugle horn. The instrument could be as much as 3 feet long. It was used from "antiquity" into the middle ages. The instrument has been used both orchestrally and in war.

== Description ==
The steerhorn is an extremely long medieval bugle horn, also known as a cowhorn or bullhorn. The steerhorn has a straight tube with an exact conical bore and no bell flare.

== Use ==
The steerhorn has been used both orchestrally and in war. The instrument is used in Wagner's Der Ring des Nibelungen, as the score requires one steerhorn in Die Walküre and four in Götterdämmerung. For Der Ring des Nibelungen, a modern substitution was created, using a set of three brass tubes. Today, many orchestras substitute the trombone or bass trombone. For Georg Solti's 1958–1965 Ring recordings a set of the instruments was specially made, as American soldiers had carried off Bayreuth's steerhorns after the end of World War II.

== See also ==
- Swedish cowhorn
- Blowing horn
