= Hans Hotter =

German opera singer

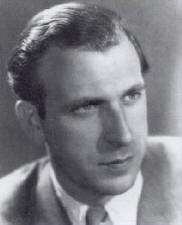
Hans Hotter

Hans Hotter (19 January 1909 – 6 December 2003) was a German operatic bass-baritone. He stood 6 feet 4 inches (1.93 m) and his appearance was striking. His voice and diction were equally recognisable.

== Early life and career ==
Born in Offenbach am Main, Hesse, Hotter studied with Matthäus Roemer in Munich. He worked as an organist and choirmaster before making his operatic debut in Opava in 1930.

He performed in Germany and Austria under the Nazi regime, avoiding pressure on performers to join the Nazi Party, and made some appearances outside the country, including concerts under the baton of Bruno Walter in Amsterdam, who advised him that if Hotter could not leave his family members he had little alternative but to remain in Germany. Hotter was unable to pursue an international career until his Covent Garden debut in 1947. After that, he sang in all the major opera houses of Europe. He made his Metropolitan Opera debut as the title character in Der fliegende Holländer in 1950. In four seasons at the Met, he performed 35 times in 13 roles, almost all Wagnerian.

Probably Hotter's best known vocal achievement was his Wotan in Der Ring des Nibelungen, beginning with the Rheingold Wotan and ending with the Siegfried Wanderer, which he first sang in the German provinces in his early 20s, and adding the Walküre shortly thereafter at the German theatre in Prague; he played the roles until the mid-1960s, by which time his voice underwent a brief crisis owing to severe asthma, causing him to miss the first season of the post-war Bayreuth Festival in 1951, but he sang there for several years starting in 1952. His interpretation of Wotan was first recorded in a 1930s studio version of Act II of Die Walküre. In Die Walküre and Siegfried he was recorded in Decca's famous Ring Cycle in the early 1960s, conducted by Georg Solti and produced by John Culshaw. His interpretation of the role of Wotan was also captured in live recordings at the Bayreuth Festival conducted by Clemens Krauss, Joseph Keilberth and Hans Knappertsbusch in the mid-1950s. He also directed a complete Ring at Covent Garden from 1961 to 1964. His portrayals of Amfortas and Gurnemanz in Parsifal was preserved on record in several of Hans Knappertsbusch's live recordings from Bayreuth.

An admired Hans Sachs in Die Meistersinger von Nürnberg, Hotter nevertheless preferred to sing the smaller and lower-pitched role of Pogner later in his career, because its tessitura was better suited to his voice. Also, he was afflicted in later years with a chronic back injury. Similarly, he sang in Parsifal first as the baritone Amfortas when he was younger and switched to the bass Gurnemanz later, and to the even lower bass Titurel after that. He was also celebrated for his Pizarro in Beethoven's Fidelio, of which a live 1960s recording from Covent Garden was issued for the first time in 2005 under the Testament label.

Hotter had a close working relationship with Richard Strauss. He performed in the premieres of the Strauss late operas: as the commandant in the 1938 opera Friedenstag, as Olivier in Capriccio in 1942 and the Jupiter in private dress rehearsal in 1944 of Die Liebe der Danae. After the end of the war, he also sang Sir Morosus in Die Schweigsame Frau with the Vienna Philharmonic conducted by Karl Böhm. Strauss dedicated his song "Erschaffen und beleben" to Hotter, who also recorded many of the songs of Strauss. Hotter's daughter Gabriele married Strauss' grandson Richard in 1962.

External audio
- You may hear Hans Hotter performing Johannes Brahms' A German Requiem, Op. 45 with Herbert von Karajan conducting the Vienna Philharmonic Orchestra and Elisabeth Schwarzkopf in 1947 Here on archive.org

Although his international fame was almost entirely in the German repertoire, in Germany and Austria he was also known for performing Verdi in the vernacular and was, for example, a popular Falstaff and a formidable Grand Inquisitor in Don Carlos, a role he also performed in Italian in several theatres, including the Metropolitan Opera in New York. He performed, and recorded, several non-German opera roles in German translation, including Count Almaviva (Mozart), Boris Godunov (Mussorgsky) and Don Basilio (Rossini).

Hotter was also known as a lieder singer. He left several recordings of Schubert lieder, including Winterreise, Schwanengesang, and other songs. He also sang sacred music and left recordings of Bach cantatas and one recording of Haydn's Die Schöpfung in which he sang both the low bass role of Archangel Raphael and the soft, high baritone role of Adam.

A passionate anti-Nazi, Hotter used to make fun of Hitler at parties and refused to take part in the Bayreuth Festival during the Third Reich because of the Festival's association with Hitler and his politics. According to Hotter's obituary in The Times, Hitler kept Hotter's records in his private collection. When Hotter was interrogated about this at a postwar denazification hearing, he answered that the Pope had some of them too.

Hotter never completely retired from the stage, making his final public appearance in his nineties after several seasons singing such significant character roles as Schigolch in Alban Berg's twelve-tone opera Lulu. He was a notable narrator in Schoenberg's Gurre-Lieder, a role he continued to take well into his eighties.

== Anecdotes ==
At a brilliant performance of Walküre in Covent Garden in 1961 a mishap occurred during the final scene when Wotan is supposed to ever so slowly, silently depart from the stage. Right after striking Brünnhild's rock to call on Loge to surround it with a cordon of fire, Hotter was blinded by the light and lost his footing, falling off the stage with a crash. As he was covered in armour, he hit ground like a bomb on a corrugated-iron factory. That, however, is not how the opera is supposed to end. Hotter did not want to suggest to the audience that he had jumped off the mountain in remorse after stripping his favourite daughter of her status as goddess and putting her to sleep. So, as the music continued, Hotter gallantly climbed back on stage, reassuring the audience that he was still alive and well and the music continued to the last chord.

At an earlier Walküre performance in 1956, also at Covent Garden, Hotter remembers a harmless but cheerful mishap. A bit late for his entrance in act III, he rushed backstage and swung an enormous cloak over his shoulders, entering the stage with his angry, impetuous "Wo ist Brünnhild?". His appearance, however, gave rise to merriment in the audience, a situation he would only understand at the end of the opera. He successfully sang for more than an hour before he realized that towering above his shoulders, invisible to him, was the coat-hanger on which the cloak had been hanging, a fluffy, pink coat-hanger. As Ernest Newman noted in his review, he was surely "the only man in the world who can actually step on stage and persuade you that he is God."
