= Alan Blyth =

British musicologist

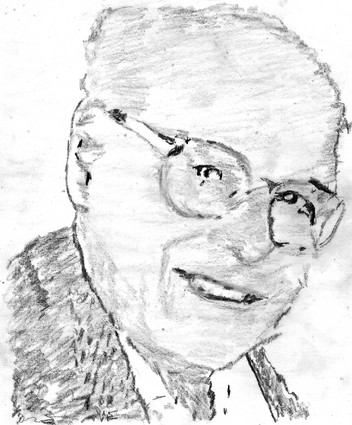
Pencil sketch of Alan Blyth

Geoffrey Alan Blyth (27 July 1929 – 14 August 2007) was an English music critic, author, and musicologist who was particularly known for his writings within the field of opera. He was a specialist on singers and singing. Born in London, Blyth's earliest musical experiences were at Rugby School. He attended the music lectures of Professor Jack Westrup. After graduation from Pembroke College, Oxford, where he read history, he returned to London and worked in journalism and publishing. He wrote reviews, interviews, and obituaries for The Times and for Gramophone. He was a long-time contributor to the British magazine Opera.

== Personal life ==
Blyth was married first to the German-born Ursula Zumloh, who died in 2000, and then to the Buddhist scholar Sue Hamilton. For the last two decades of his life, he lived in Lavenham, Suffolk. He wrote a critical discography of Heddle Nash, a singer he much admired, together with Paul Campion, and with the help of Nash's son.

== Articles and books ==
- Blyth, Alan. Colin Davis (Recordmasters/2). Ian Allan, London, 1972 (ISBN 978-0-7110-0319-4)
- Blyth, Alan (3 May 2013). "Karl Böhm, interviewed by Alan Blyth (Gramophone, December 1972)". The Gramophone.
- Blyth, Alan, ed. Opera on Record. Hutchinson, London, Melbourne, 1979 (ISBN 978-0-09-139980-1) Blyth also contributed the chapters on Der Freischütz, Otello, Der Ring des Nibelungen, Manon, Eugene Onegin, Die Fledermaus and Peter Grimes.
- Blyth, Alan, ed. (1981). Remembering Britten. Hutchinson. ISBN 978-0-09-144950-6.
- Blyth, Alan, ed. Opera on Record 2. Hutchinson, London, Melbourne, 1983 (ISBN 978-0-09-153120-1) Blyth also contributed the chapters on Samson et Dalila and Hänsel und Gretel.
- Blyth, Alan (23 October 1986). Song on Record: Volume 1, Lieder. Cambridge: Cambridge University Press. ISBN 978-0-521-26844-8.
- Blyth, Alan (1995). Opera on Video. Trafalgar Square Publishing. ISBN 978-1-85626-175-3.
- Blyth, Alan (1 November 2014). "An interview with Heinz Holliger". The Gramophone.
