= Jimmy Chiang =

Hong Kong–born Austrian conductor and pianist

- Born: Hong Kong
- Education: Trinity College London (FTCL); Baylor University (BM); University of Music and Performing Arts Vienna (MA)
- Occupations: Conductor; pianist; Kapellmeister
- Years active: 2007–present
- Employers: Pan Asia Symphony Orchestra; Vienna Boys' Choir
- Style: Classical; opera
- Website: www.jimmychiang.com

Jimmy Chiang is a Hong Kong–born Austrian conductor and pianist based in Vienna. Since 2013, he has served as a Kapellmeister of the Vienna Boys' Choir. In autumn 2025, he was appointed a Bösendorfer Ambassador.

== Early life and education ==
Chiang's father was a flautist and his mother, a mezzo-soprano and choir director. Chiang began studying piano at the age of four and also learned harpsichord, organ, cello and composition. At age 13, he made his first public appearance as a concert pianist with the Hong Kong Pan Asia Symphony Orchestra, in which he also served as a cellist from 1994 to 1996; he has been its principal conductor since 2008.

In 1994, Chiang received a Diploma in Piano Performance (FTCL) from Trinity College of Music London in Hong Kong. From 1996 to 2000, he attended Baylor University in Waco, Texas, where he studied piano with Krassimira Jordan (student of Emil Gilels) and conducting with Daniel Sternberg, earning a Bachelor of Music degree. Chiang subsequently moved to Vienna and studied at the University of Music and Performing Arts Vienna. He studied orchestral conducting with Leopold Hager (becoming his last student), piano with Wolfgang Watzinger (student of Rudolf Serkin), and choral conducting with Erwin Ortner, completing a Magister Artium degree with distinction in 2006.

In 2003, he was invited by Seiji Ozawa to study under him and perform at the Rohm Music Festival in Kyoto, Japan.

== Career ==
=== Competition ===
In 2007, Chiang won First Prize at the 4th International Competition of Young Conductors Lovro von Matačić in Zagreb, Croatia.

=== Opera and orchestra conducting (2007–2013) ===
From 2007 to 2009, Chiang worked at Theater Lübeck in Germany as Assistant Music Director for Wagner's Der Ring des Nibelungen. During this time, he was musical assistant for opera productions at the Eutin Opera Festival. From 2009 to 2011, he joined Theater Freiburg as Kapellmeister, where he conducted several new productions, including Ligeti's Le Grand Macabre directed by Calixto Bieito.

He also appeared as a guest conductor at the Komische Oper Berlin, Theater Heidelberg and Schönbrunn Palace Theatre in Vienna.

=== Vienna Boys' Choir (2013–present) ===
Chiang has worked with the Hong Kong Pan Asia Symphony Orchestra as a pianist, cellist and conductor, and has served as its principal conductor since 2008.

In autumn 2013, Chiang was appointed a choirmaster of the Vienna Boys' Choir and director of the Haydn Choir, one of the organisation's four touring choirs. He has led the choir on tours in Europe, Asia, and the Americas. In 2016, he made his conducting debut at Carnegie Hall.

During his tenure with the Vienna Boys' Choir, Chiang conducted and prepared the choir for performances at venues including the Vienna Musikverein, Carnegie Hall, Elbphilharmonie Hamburg, Suntory Hall in Tokyo, and the Seoul Arts Center. He has also collaborated with the Vienna Philharmonic, in productions conducted by Riccardo Muti and Franz Welser-Möst, and appears on CD albums released by Deutsche Grammophon and Decca.

Alongside his work as a conductor for the choir, Chiang performs as a pianist. In August 2026, he appeared with Sebastian Holecek at Hotel Panhans during the Kultur.Sommer.Semmering festival in Semmering, Austria. The concert included both accompaniment and solo piano performances. He also performs as pianist at various concerts, including Schloss Halbturn.

=== Other music activities ===
In 2016, Chiang founded the Hong Kong–Vienna Music Festival and served as its artistic director and conductor until 2018. He also conducted the festival's closing performance of Mahler's Symphony No. 8 at Hong Kong City Hall, which brought together more than 250 performers from Hong Kong and Vienna.

Since 2021, Chiang has appeared regularly as a guest conductor at the Taranto Opera Festival, where his productions have included Carmen, The Marriage of Figaro and Don Giovanni. In 2025, he served as musical director of the Piccolo Opera Festival's production of Donizetti's Rita in Gorizia, Italy, and Dobrovo, Slovenia.

He has conducted orchestras including the Vienna Radio Symphony Orchestra, Vienna Chamber Orchestra, Vienna Imperial Chapel, Zagreb Philharmonic, Orquesta Sinfónica de Castilla y León, Irkutsk Philharmonic, Pori Sinfonietta and the Hong Kong Philharmonic Orchestra.

Chiang has served as artistic adviser to the Hong Kong Children's Symphony. He was also musical director of Kinderoper Papageno in Vienna from 2011.
