= Alois Pernerstorfer =

Austrian opera singer

Alois Pernerstorfer (3 June 1912 – 12 May 1978) was an Austrian bass-baritone

Born in Vienna, Pernerstorfer began his training in 1933 at the Wiener Musikhochschule with Theo Lierhammer and Josef Krips and made his opera debut in 1936 in Graz singing the role of Biterolf in Tannhäuser. He sang for many years at the Vienna State Opera and the Vienna Volksoper, and was a regular performer at the Salzburg Festival, where he sang in the European premiere of Samuel Barber's Vanessa. He also sang at the New York Metropolitan Opera (1951-1952), the Glyndebourne Festival, La Scala, and other major European opera houses.

Pernerstorfer's first wife was the soprano Henriette Herze, prominent in operetta at the Vienna Volksoper, as was his second wife, the soprano Emmy Funk. In 1963, Alois Pernerstorfer was made a Kammersänger of Austria, and in 1977 he was awarded the Großes Ehrenzeichen (Grand Order of Merit) by the Austrian government.

He died in Vienna at age 65.

== Recordings ==
- Wagner: Rienzi (Set Svanholm (Tenor), Christa Ludwig (Mezzo Soprano), Walter Berry (Bass Baritone), Teresa Stich-Randall (Soprano), Heinz Holecek (Tenor), Karl Terkal (Baritone), Anne Christiansen (Soprano), Alois Pernerstorfer (Bass Baritone), Paul Schöffler (Bass)). Vienna State Opera Orchestra and Chorus; Conductor: Josef Krips. Melodram MEL 10039.
- Wagner: Götterdämmerung (Kirsten Flagstad (Soprano), Max Lorenz (Tenor), Josef Hermann (Baritone), Alois Pernerstorfer (Bass Baritone), Hilde Konetzni (Soprano), Elisabeth Höngen (Mezzo Soprano) ) Teatro alla Scala Orchestra and Chorus; Conductor: Wilhelm Furtwängler. Urania URA 154.
- Samuel Barber: Vanessa (Norman Foster, Eleanor Steber, Nicolai Gedda, Alois Pernerstorfer, Rosalind Elias, Ira Malaniuk, Giorgio Tozzi) Vienna State Opera Chorus, Vienna Philharmonic Orchestra; Conductor: Dimitri Mitropoulos. Orfeo ORF 653062.
