= Hong Kong Children's Choir =

- Traditional Chinese: 香港兒童合唱團
- Simplified Chinese: 香港儿童合唱团
Transcriptions
Standard Mandarin
- Hanyu Pinyin: Xiānggǎng Értóng Héchàngtuán
Yue: Cantonese
- Jyutping: hoeng1 gong2 ji4 tung4 hap6 coeng3 tyun4

The Hong Kong Children's Choir is a children's choir in Hong Kong, founded in 1969 by Yip Wai-hong as a government-registered non-profit organization. At present the Hong Kong Children'S Choir is the world's largest children's choir. The choir, currently led by music director and Principal Conductor Kathy Fok, has over 5000 members. Members train with 100 professional instructors.

The choir frequently performs overseas, and won the Audience Award in Hungary's at 2006's Vivace International Choir Festival, and the "Gold Award" in 2008's Shanghai International Children's Choir Showcase.

== Concerts ==
The choir performed at the 1999 Hong Kong Chorus Marathon for the hearing impaired, the 2001 Hong Kong Association of the Deaf Charity Concert, the 2003 We Care concert for the SARS outbreak, the 2006 Peoples Innocence Fundraising Concert for the University of Hong Kong, the 2008 Marathon Concert for the Quinghai earthquake, the 2010 Hong Kong World Vision Fundraiser for the Sichuan earthquake, and the 2011 A Christmas Carol Festival children's charity concert.

It has also performed at the Hong Kong handover ceremony in 1997, the 1998 opening ceremony of the Hong Kong International Airport, the 2005 opening ceremony of Hong Kong Disneyland, the 2007 multi-field activities to celebrate the 10th Anniversary of the reunification, the 2008 series of activities to meet the 2008 Beijing Olympic Games, the 2009 series of activities to celebrate the sixtieth anniversary of the choir's founding, and the 2012 East Asian Games opening ceremony. The choir has also participated in more than fifteen anniversary celebrations of the reunification.
