= Chinese Cabinets in Schönbrunn Palace =

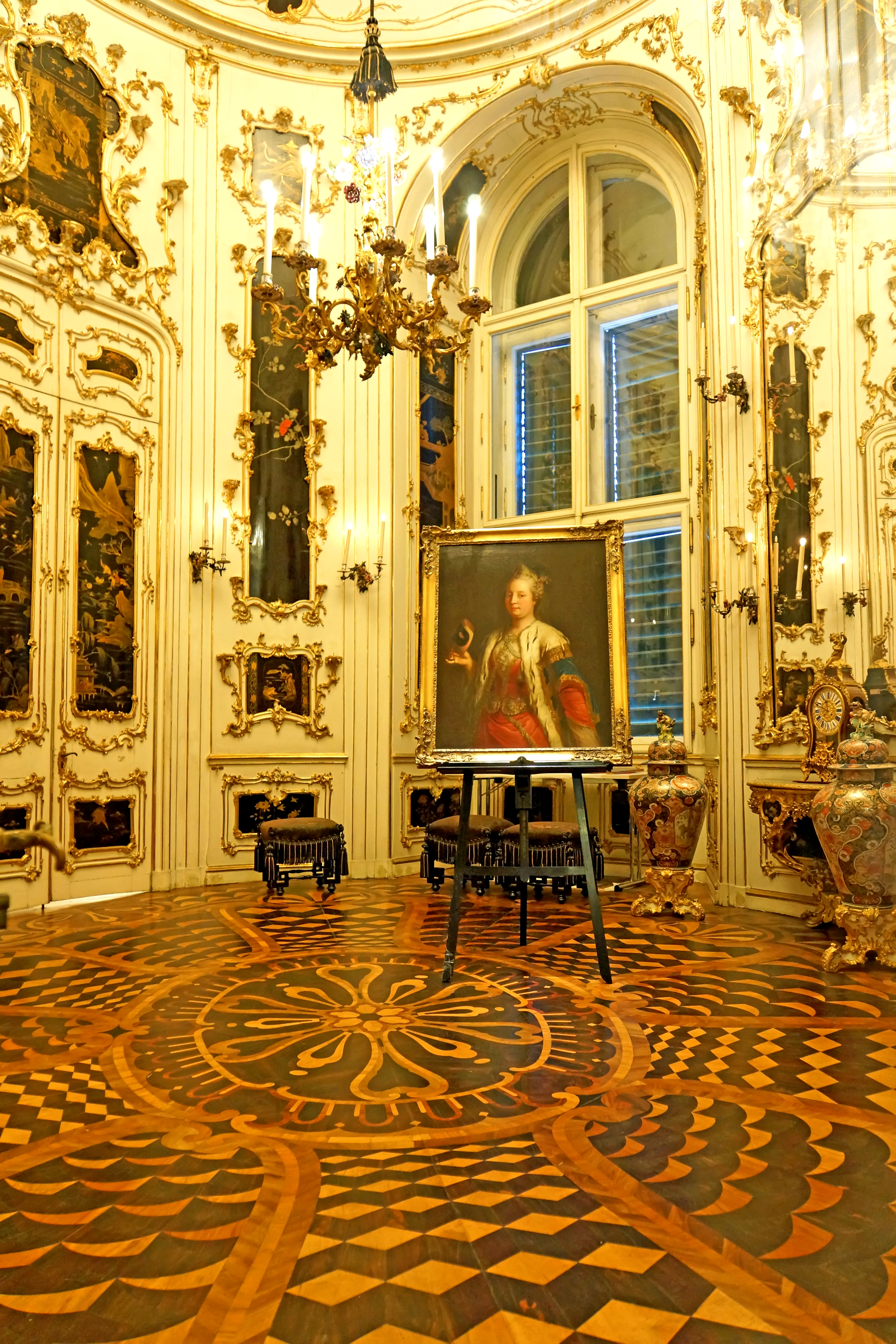
Oval Chinese Cabinet in Schönbrunn Castle

The oval and the round Chinese Cabinets next to the Small Gallery are two rooms situated in the béletage of Schönbrunn Palace Corps de Logis in Vienna, Austria. Their decoration contains Chinese and Japanese porcelain as well as lacquerwork, silk and wooden paneling. It is likely that they were built as private rooms for the Austrian empress Maria Theresa of the Habsburg dynasty who took a special interest in Far Eastern art.

== Historical context of the Chinese Cabinets ==
Today's appearance of the oval and round Chinese Cabinet are closely connected to the remodelling of the palace initiated by the Austrian empress Maria Theresia. In 1743 she took the decision to change the former Schönbrunn hunting lot in the Habsburgian summer residence. This brought a change in the interior design from baroque to the nowadays-Rococo decoration. The architect Nikolaus Pacassi was responsible for three phases of reconstruction between 1743 and 1764.

=== First remodelling period ===
The two Chinese Cabinets were planned and built in the first remodelling period that took place 1743–50. The original decoration of this period is lost. Prince Johann Josef Khevenhüller-Metsch mentions in his diary that the round cabinet has been called "chambre de conspiration", according to the round table which was standing in the middle of the room. This table was called "table de conspiration" (table of conspiracy). This name refers to the room's special mechanics that permitted the table to appear and disappear through a hole in the ground in a circular room directly under the round cabinet. The hole was closed in 1760. The room was used for Maria Theresia's meeting with her counsellors. Both cabinets had a very private character. The oval cabinet was used for social events like small family dinners and card games.

=== Second remodelling period ===
In 1754 Maria Theresia and her husband Francis I of Lorrain visited the Chinese porcelain cabinet of Prince Joseph Wenzel Lichtenstein. This inspired them to redecorate the Schönrunn's Chinese Cabinets. In the second phase of reconstruction (1755–60) both cabinets received their current appearance with the white painted wooden panelling, the so-called boiseries, and the thin wooden gilded Rococo ornaments. On consoles on the walls, porcelain figures, vases and vessels were placed. Some of the vessels are painted in a Japanese lacquer technique, so called urushi.

The porcelain objects were mainly imported from China, with some pieces seeming to have been produced in Vienna by the Viennese porcelain maker Du Pacqiuer. A new research project will attempt to date the objects of the Schönrunn's Chinese cabinets and to find out where they were originally produced.

== Mounting of porcelain in the Chinese cabinets ==
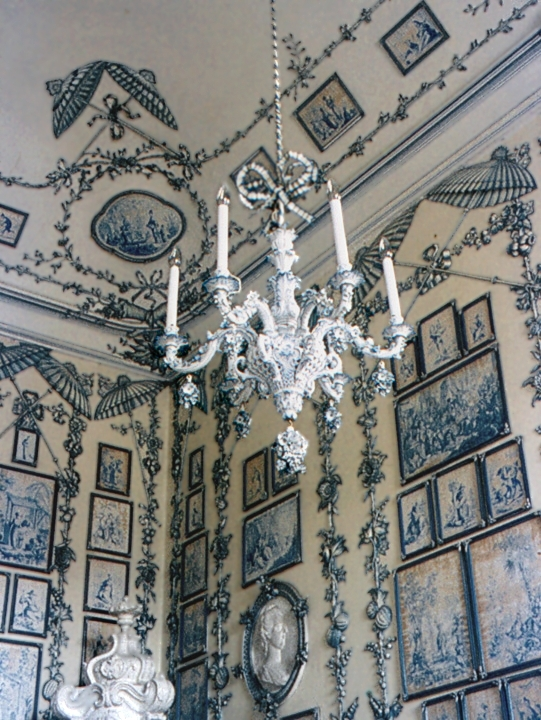
A china chandelier in the china room at Schönbrunn

During the Baroque and Rococo eras, European aristocrats collected decoration pieces from East Asia. The Chinese cabinets of Schönbrunn palace represent such collection from the period of Empress Maria Theresia. The Oval cabinet comprises a colourful collection which is in contrast with the collection of the round cabinet. The round cabinet has ceramics in blue and white colour theme throughout with an exception of six Chinese figurines which have more colours.

The collection was found to be in need of conservational intervention during an art historical examination. Most of the consoles on which objects were mounted were found to be deformed by ageing. In a project supported by the Austrian Science Fund, various aspects of the collection have been studied. The focus of research was to investigate the various materials that have been used in the collection, and the production technology and history of objects, and to find out the history of various conservation measures that have been done on the collection in the past. The conservation concept has been prepared for porcelains, lacquerware panels, white-painted woodwork and gilded frames, with an aim to provide a sustainable and flexible mounting system.

Surveys have been done on wooden panelling, lacquerware panels and the presentation of the objects on the consoles. Studies on recording the climate conditions (relative humidity, temperature, UV & light) and vibrations caused by visitor and vehicular traffic are going on. The benefitting or damaging previous conservations are differentiated. Objects are grouped according to their damage and conservation requirements. Cleaning is recommended for entire collection. New mounting concept is made and the products are being tested. The results of vibration will be used to find the need to add supplementary layers of vibration debilitating visco-elasticity materials. The concept will be in action soon.

== The research of lacquer in Schönbrunn palace ==
The two “Chinese Cabinets” furnished with East Asian lacquer panels and porcelain were built between 1746 and 1760 in Schönbrunn Palace during the reign of Empress Maria Theresia. There are five different types of lacquer panels, Chinese polychrome lacquer panels (Type A), Chinese lacquer panels with gold decoration (Type B), Chinese coromandel lacquer panels (Type C), Japanese maki-e panels (Type D) and European lacquer panels (Type E).

The arrangement we see today is not the original one, but it is the oldest of which we have any documentation. Type A could be dated to the first half of the 18th century. Natural things as flowers, birds, stones, butterflies and phoenixes were depicted. Type B were dated around 1720 and scenes of palace life, hunting, landscapes with pavilions, children at play, women cavorting and men conversing were the painting contents. Type C were the oldest in the cabinets and could be dated to the Kangxi period (1662–1722). Palace scenes with ornate borders showing the so-called “100 antiquities” were depicted. Type D were the most recent works in the cabinets and were produced in Japan at the end of the 19th century, probably after the 1873 Vienna World's Fair, where Jaray might have made contacts with Japanese producers. Type E were different from the Asian lacquers judging from the distinctive surface appearances, different flow and expressions. A series of scientific analysis including cross-section optical microscopy observation, staining tests, GC-MS and Py-GC-MS were performed on these precious lacquers.

Results illustrated that objects were multi-layer structured, the lacquer layer was mainly composed of aged laccol with some urushiol, drying oil and cedrol oil, the coating was based on oxidised shellac and oil-resinous varnish composed of linseed oil and Manila copal among the Chinese lacquers. Heat-bodied linseed oil, oxidised shellac, aged urushiol and soot or tar were also detected in the Japanese panels. As for the European ones, traces of pine pitch or pine resins were found in addition to linseed oil.

What also draws the attention was the confirmation of pig's blood in the grounding of the Chinese panels with the forensic DNA fingerprint. It is a tradition that pig's blood is used to seal the wooden support by whisking the blood and adding chalk or lime and also as a mixture with tile powder to build up foundation layers.

== Sources ==
- Kleinschmidt, F., Die Porzellane aus den "Chinesischen" Kabinetten in Schloss Schönbrunn. Zum Umgang mit der Restauriergeschichte übermalter Porzellane, Semesterbericht, Universität für angewandte Kunst Wien, 2014. (German)
- Krist, G./ Iby, E.,Investigation and Conservation of East Asian Cabinets in imperial residences (1700–1900) Lacquerware and Porcelain Conference 2013 Postprints. Bohlau Verlag Wien Koln Weimer, Vienna 2015, (German) ISBN 978-3-205-20133-5
- Miklin-Kniefacz, S./ Miklin, R./ Kafer, S./ Schwetz, F./ Pitthard, V./ Stanek, S./ Griesser, M./ Parson, W., First investigation of the Asian lacquer panels in the “Chinese Cabinets”, Schönbrunn Palace, Vienna, pp. 149–168. (German)
- Odegaard, N./ Carroll, S./ Zimmt, W. S., Material characterization tests for objects of art and archaeology, London 2005. (German)
- Zhang, K./ Zhang, B. J./ Fang, S. Q., The application history and scientific nature of blood-based materials in traditional Chinese mortar, Sciences of Conservation and Archaeology, 2013, (2): pp. 94–102.
