= Yip Wai-hong =

Yip Wai-hong (1930 – 16 June 2024) was a composer and music educator from Hong Kong. He founded the Pan Asia Symphony Orchestra, Children's Symphony Orchestra and the Hong Kong Children's Choir.
