= Pan Asia Symphony Orchestra =

Orchestra in Hong Kong

Pan Asia Symphony Orchestra is a Hong Kong–based classical music orchestra. The Orchestra has performed frequently in the Hong Kong City Hall, regional town halls and civic centres a few hundred times over the past 34 years. A number of internationally famous conductors and soloists have been invited to perform with it.

Yip Wai-hong was the music director and music educator. He served Hong Kong Baptist University as the Head of Music and Fine Arts Department for almost 30 years. He founded the Pan Asia Symphony Orchestra, as well as three children's musical ensembles, with the aim to nourish young talents in Hong Kong.

Jimmy Chiang, the Principal Guest Conductor, is a Hong Kong-born conductor and pianist. He received the Fellowship Diploma of Trinity College in London at the age of 16. Other Orchestras he has worked with include the Hong Kong Sinfonietta; in 2010 Chiang made his debut at the Komische Oper Berlin.

Yap Man-shan is the piano soloist, was a student in the Bachelor of Music (Hons) Degree programme at the Hong Kong Academy for Performing Arts studying with Gabriel Kwok. After graduating in 200, she continued to pursue postgraduate studies at the Eastman School of Music and gained her Doctor of Musical Arts degree in 2006. Her major was in piano performance and literature under the tutelage of Nelita True, and she also studied chamber music and accompaniment with Jean Barr. She has performed with various orchestras including the Rochester Philharmonic and the Texas Fort Worth Chamber Orchestra. She has performed in Tokyo, New York City, Guangzhou, and Macau. Her many awards include the Hong Kong Jockey Club Music and Dance Fund and the Asian Cultural Council Lady Fung Memorial Music Fellowship. Yap is currently on the piano faculty of the Hong Kong Academy for Performing Arts and a guest instructor at the School of Continuing and Professional Studies, Chinese University of Hong Kong.
