= Schönbrunn Palace =

Palace in Vienna, Austria

- Schloss Schönbrunn
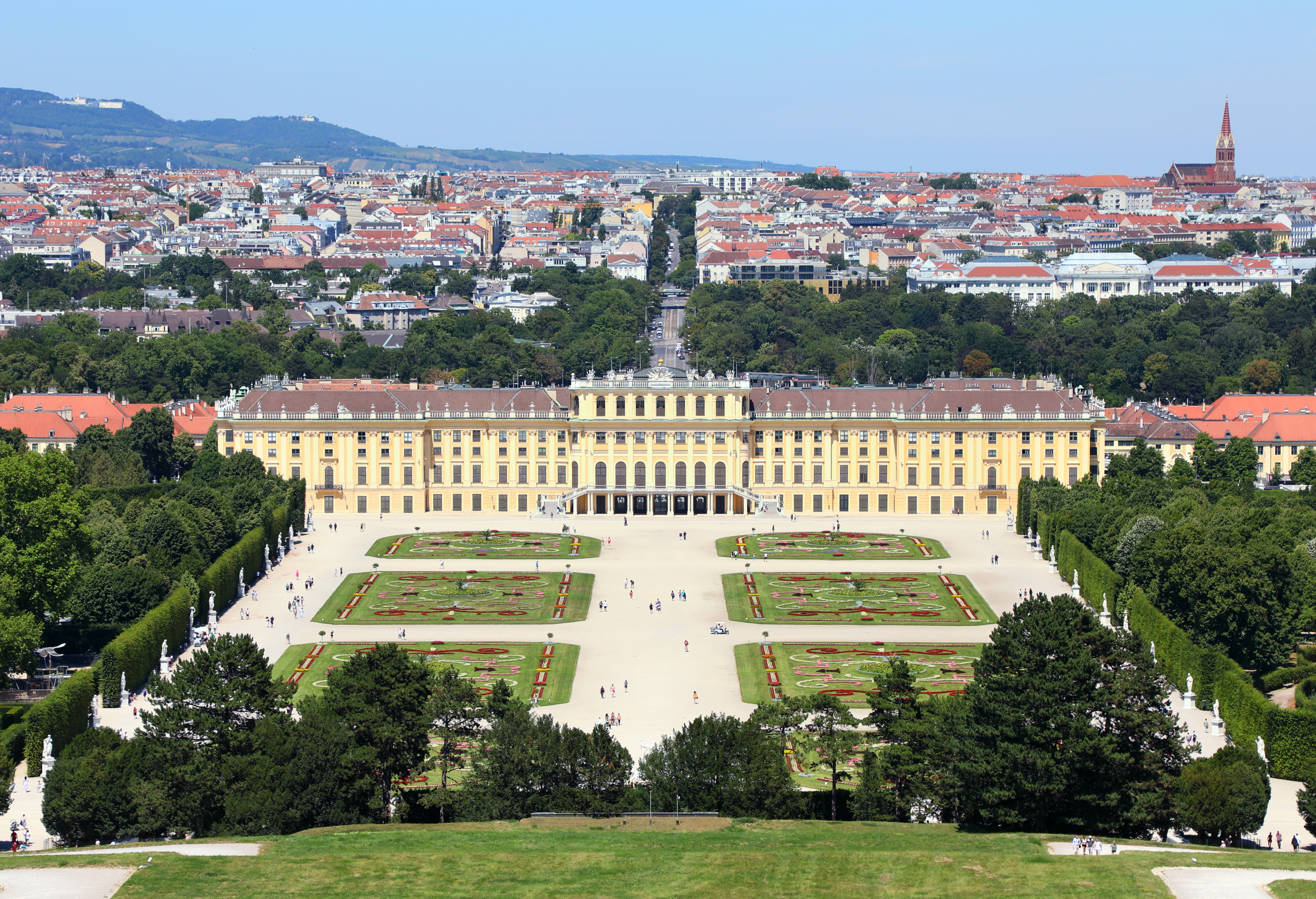
- Schönbrunn Palace in 2022

- Location within Vienna

General information
- Location: Hietzing, Vienna, Austria
- Coordinates: 48°11′04″N 16°18′43″E

Website
- Official site

UNESCO World Heritage Site
- Official name: Palace and Gardens of Schönbrunn
- Criteria: Cultural: i, iv
- Reference: 786
- Inscription: 1996 (20th Session)
- Area: 160 ha (400 acres)

Schönbrunn Palace (German: Schloss Schönbrunn [ˈʃlɔs ʃøːnˈbʁʊn]) was the main summer residence of the Habsburg rulers, located in Hietzing, the 13th district of Vienna. The name Schönbrunn (meaning "beautiful spring") has its roots in an artesian well from which water was consumed by the court.

The 1,441-room Baroque palace is one of the most important architectural, cultural, and historic monuments in the country. The history of the palace and its vast gardens spans over 300 years, reflecting the changing tastes, interests, and aspirations of successive Habsburg monarchs. It has been a major tourist attraction since the mid-1950s.

== History ==
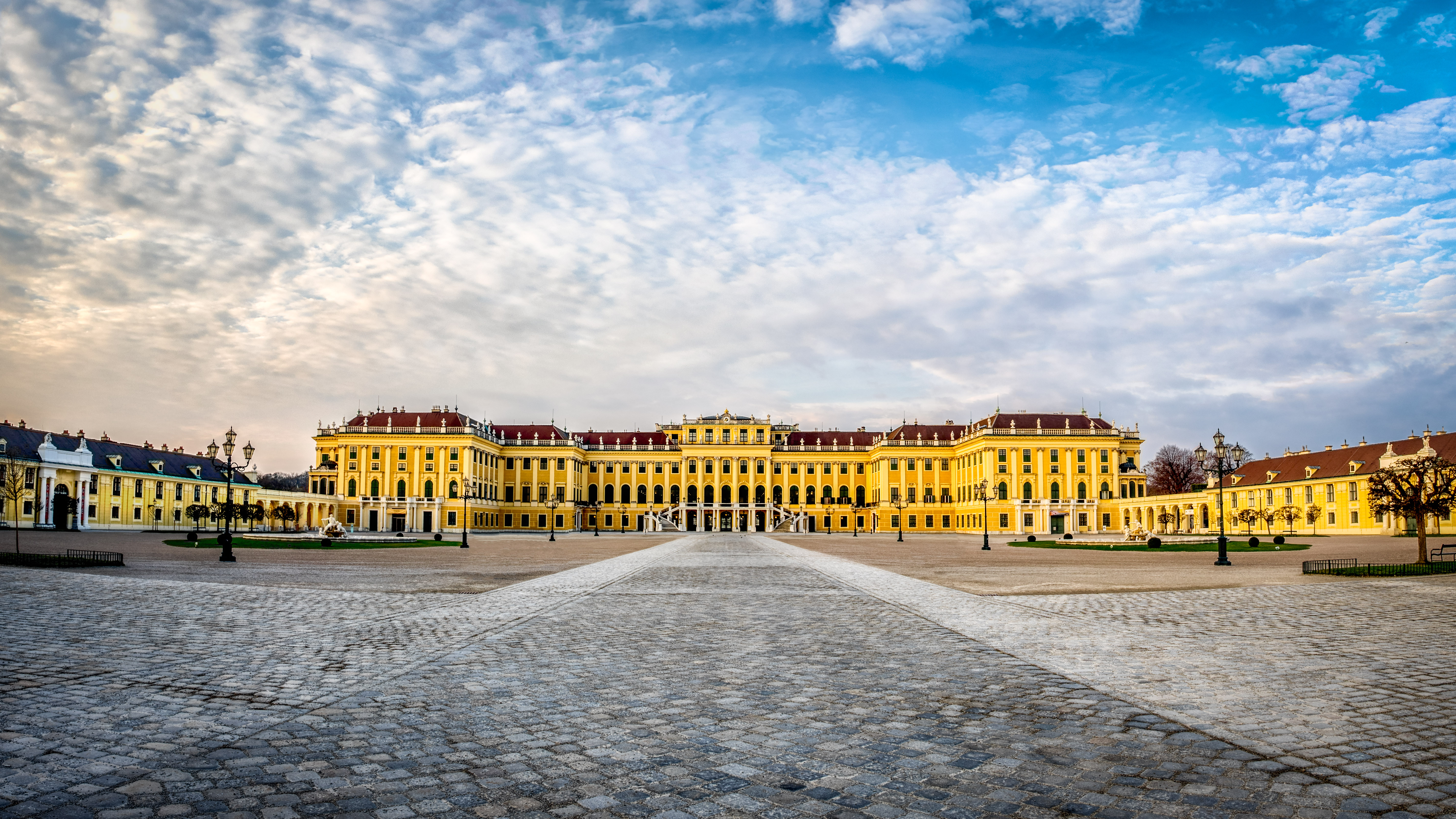
Schönbrunn from the main entrance

The first owner, in 1548, had erected a mansion called Katterburg.In 1569, Holy Roman Emperor Maximilian II purchased it the emperor ordered the area to be fenced and put game there such as pheasants, ducks, deer and boar, in order for it to serve as the court's recreational hunting ground. In a small separate part of the area, "exotic" birds such as turkeys and peafowl were kept. Fishponds were also excavated.

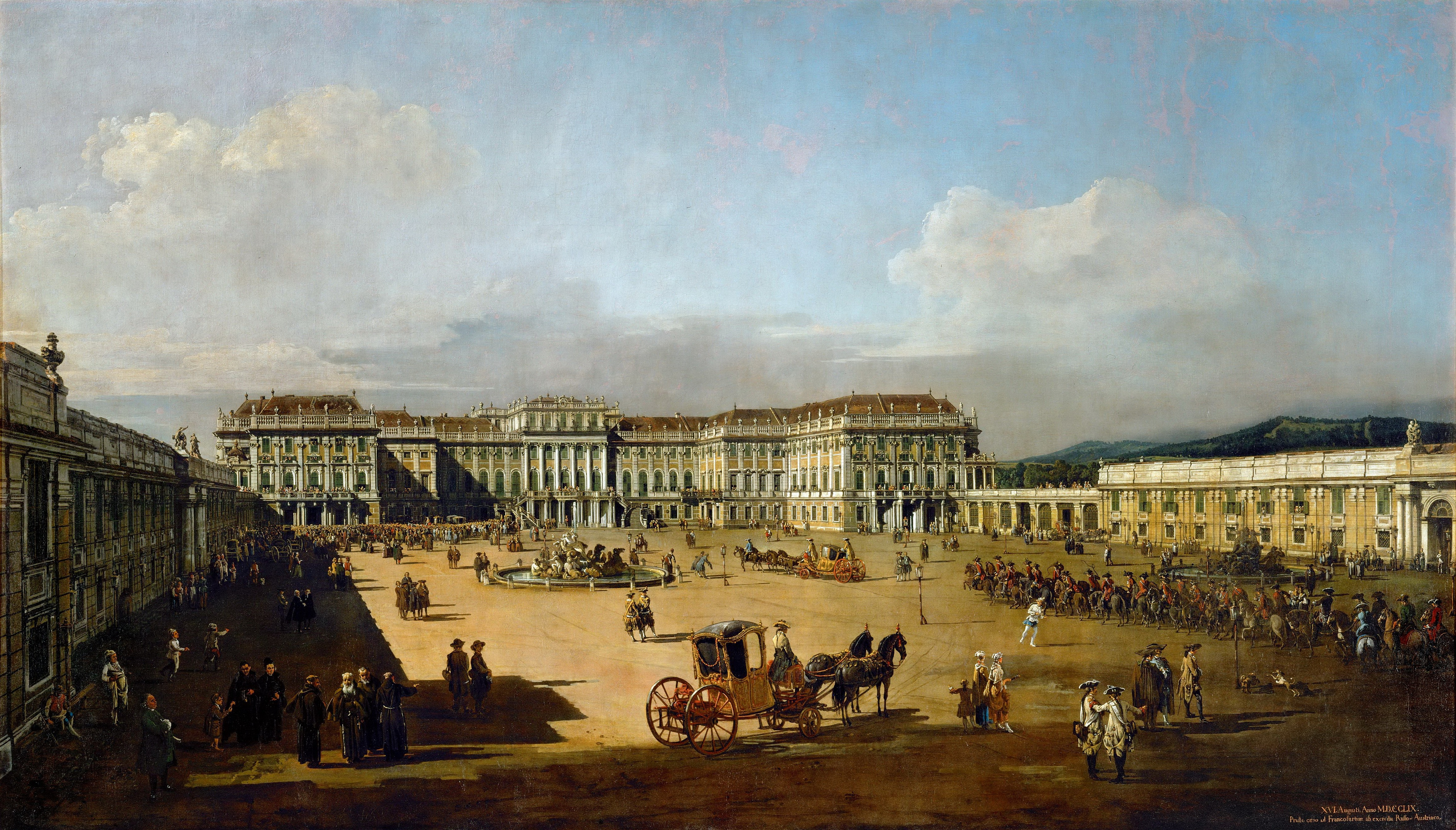
Das kaiserliche Lustschloß Schönbrunn, Ehrenhofseite by Bernardo Bellotto, 1759–1760

During the next century, the area was used as a hunting and recreation ground. Eleonora Gonzaga, who loved hunting, spent much time there and was bequeathed the area as her widow's residence after the death of her husband, Ferdinand II. From 1638 to 1643, she added a palace to the Katterburg mansion, while in 1642 came the first mention of the name "Schönbrunn" on an invoice. The origins of the Schönbrunn orangery seem to go back to Eleonora Gonzaga as well. The Schönbrunn Palace in its present form was built and remodelled during the 1740–1750s by Baron Diego Pereira d'Aguilar during the reign of empress Maria Theresa who received the estate as a wedding gift. Franz I commissioned the redecoration of the palace exterior in the neoclassical style as it appears today.

Franz Joseph, the longest-reigning Emperor of Austria, was born at Schönbrunn and spent a great deal of his life there. He died there, at the age of 86, on 21 November 1916. Following the downfall of the Habsburg monarchy in November 1918, the palace became the property of the newly founded Austrian Republic and was preserved as a museum.

During World War II, the palace was bombed by American warplanes in February 1945. After the war and during the Allied Occupation of Austria (1945–1955), Schönbrunn Palace was requisitioned to provide office space for both the British Delegation to the Allied Commission for Austria, and for the headquarters for the small British Military Garrison present in Vienna. With the reestablishment of the Austrian republic in 1955, the palace once again became a museum. It is still sometimes used for important events such as the meeting between U.S. President John F. Kennedy and Soviet premier Nikita Khrushchev in 1961.

Since 1992, the palace and gardens have been owned and administered by the Schloss Schönbrunn Kultur-und Betriebsges.m.b.H., a limited-liability company wholly owned by the Republic of Austria. The company conducts preservation and restoration of all palace properties without state subsidies. UNESCO catalogued Schönbrunn Palace on the World Heritage List in 1996, together with its gardens, as a remarkable Baroque ensemble and example of synthesis of the arts (Gesamtkunstwerk).

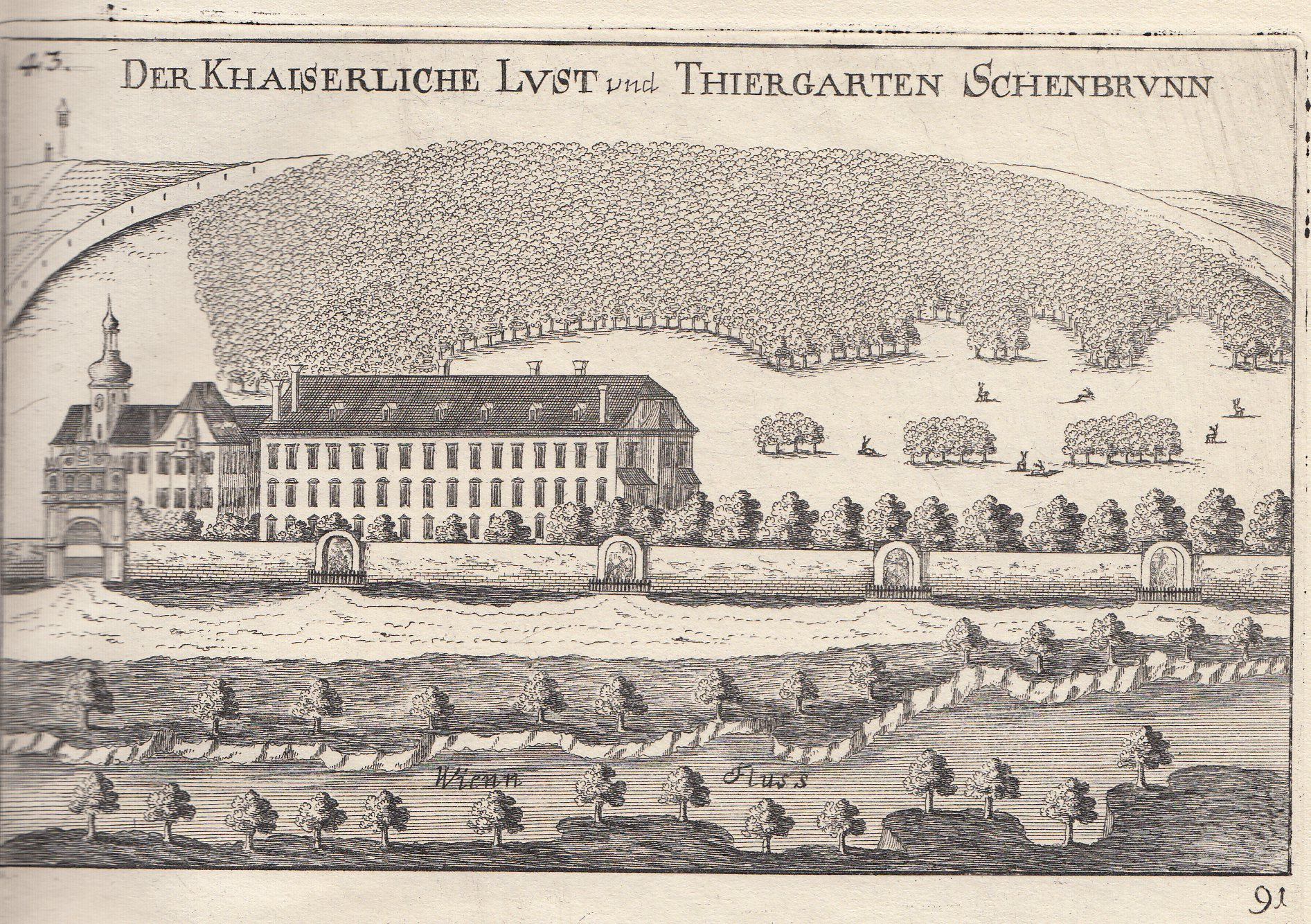
Schloss Katterburg and Gonzaga's palace, 1672

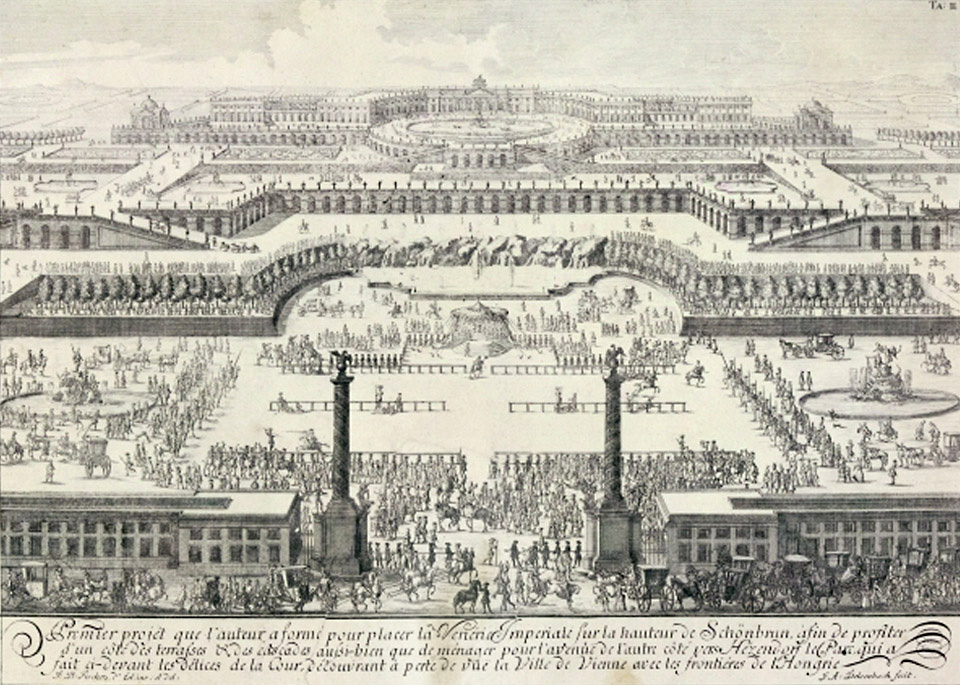
Johann Bernhard Fischer von Erlach's first design, 1688

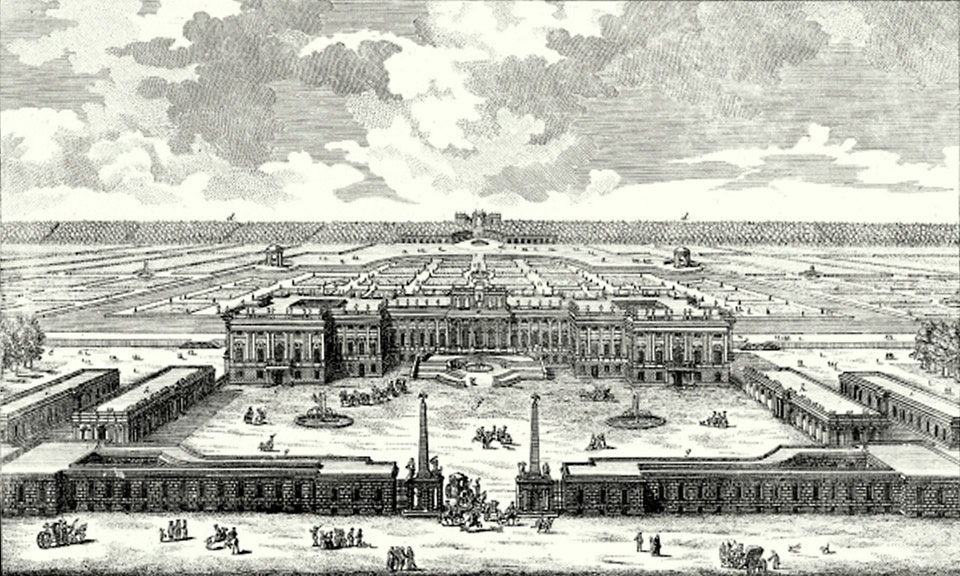
Fischer von Erlach's second design, after 1693

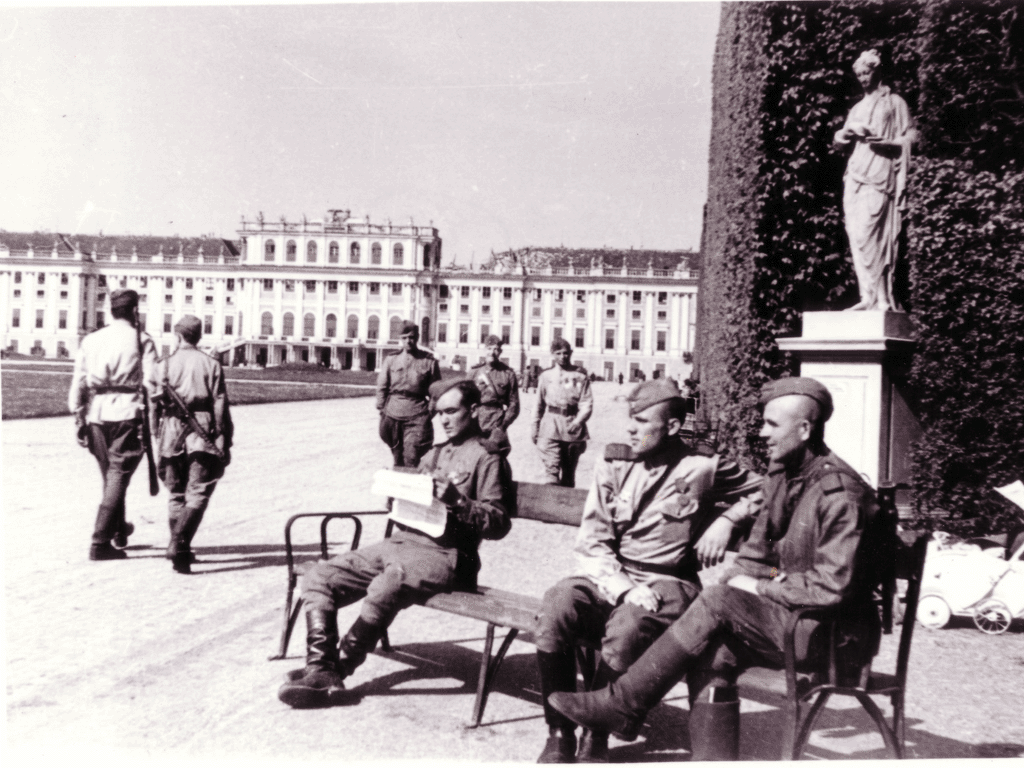
Soviet troops in the Schönbrunn Palace gardens, 1945

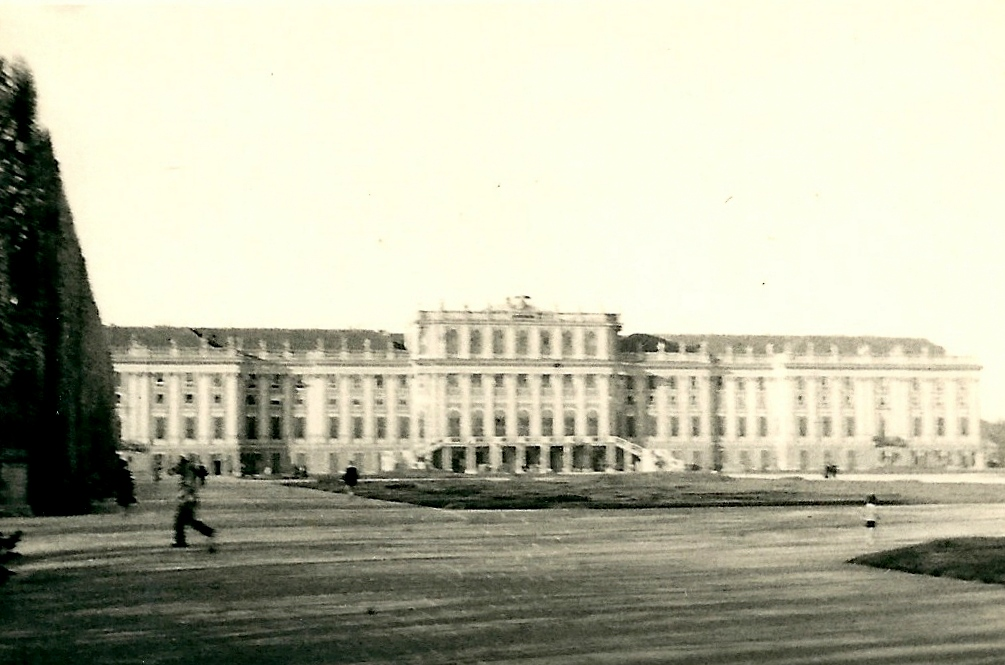
Schönbrunn during British occupation, 1951

== Gardens ==
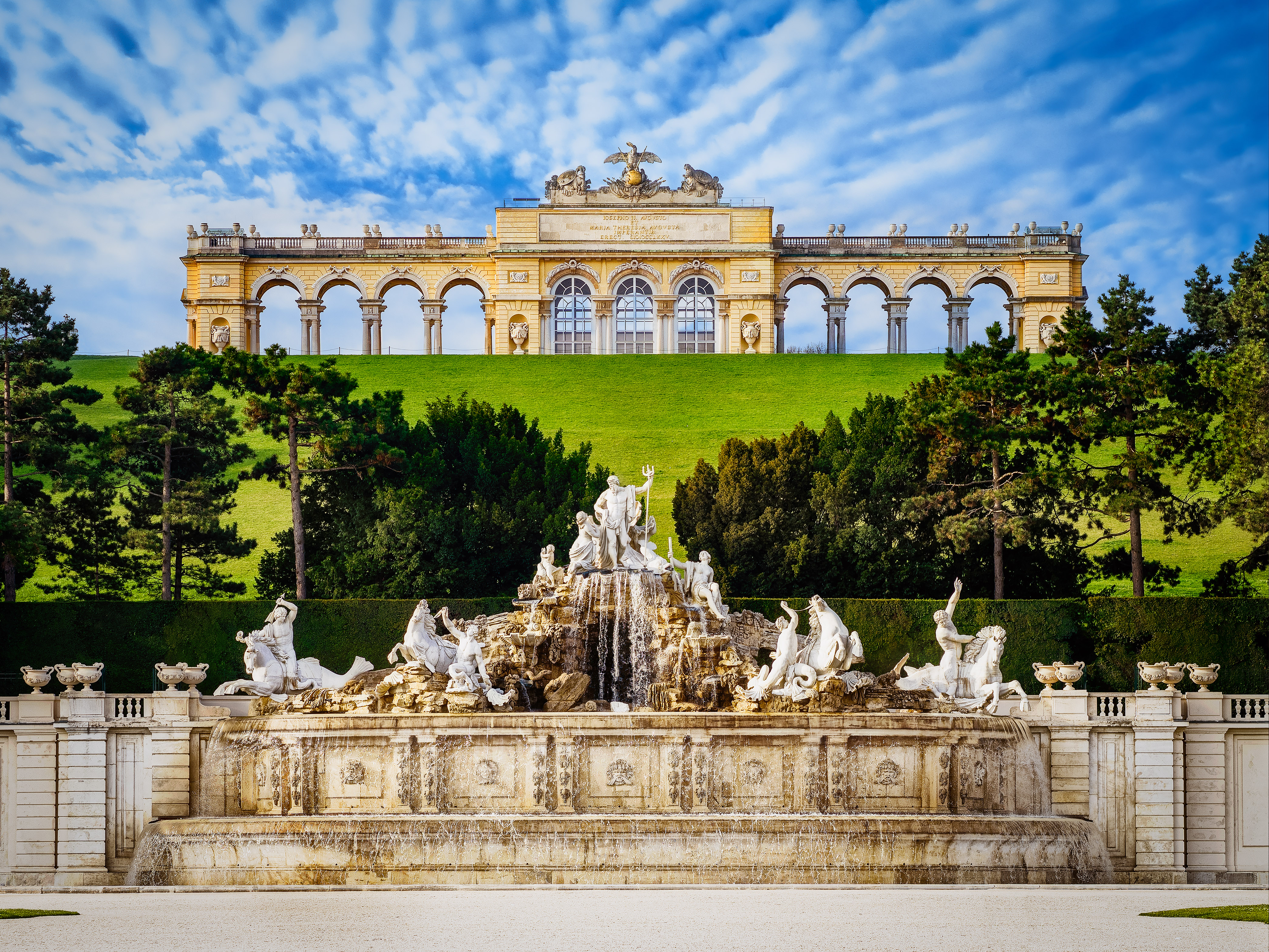
Neptune Fountain, with Gloriette in the background

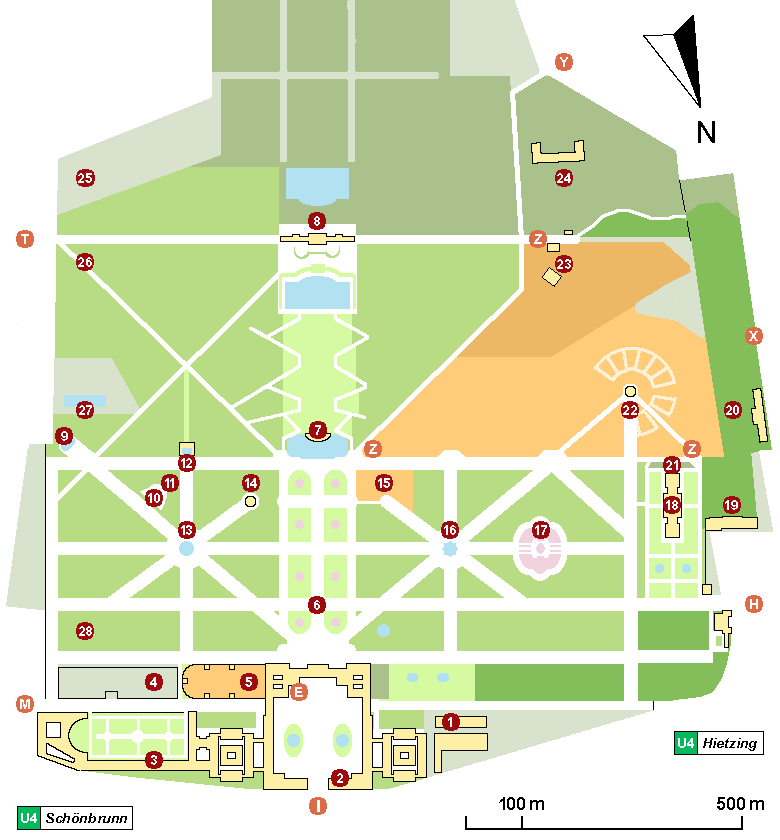
Schönbrunn Gardens map.

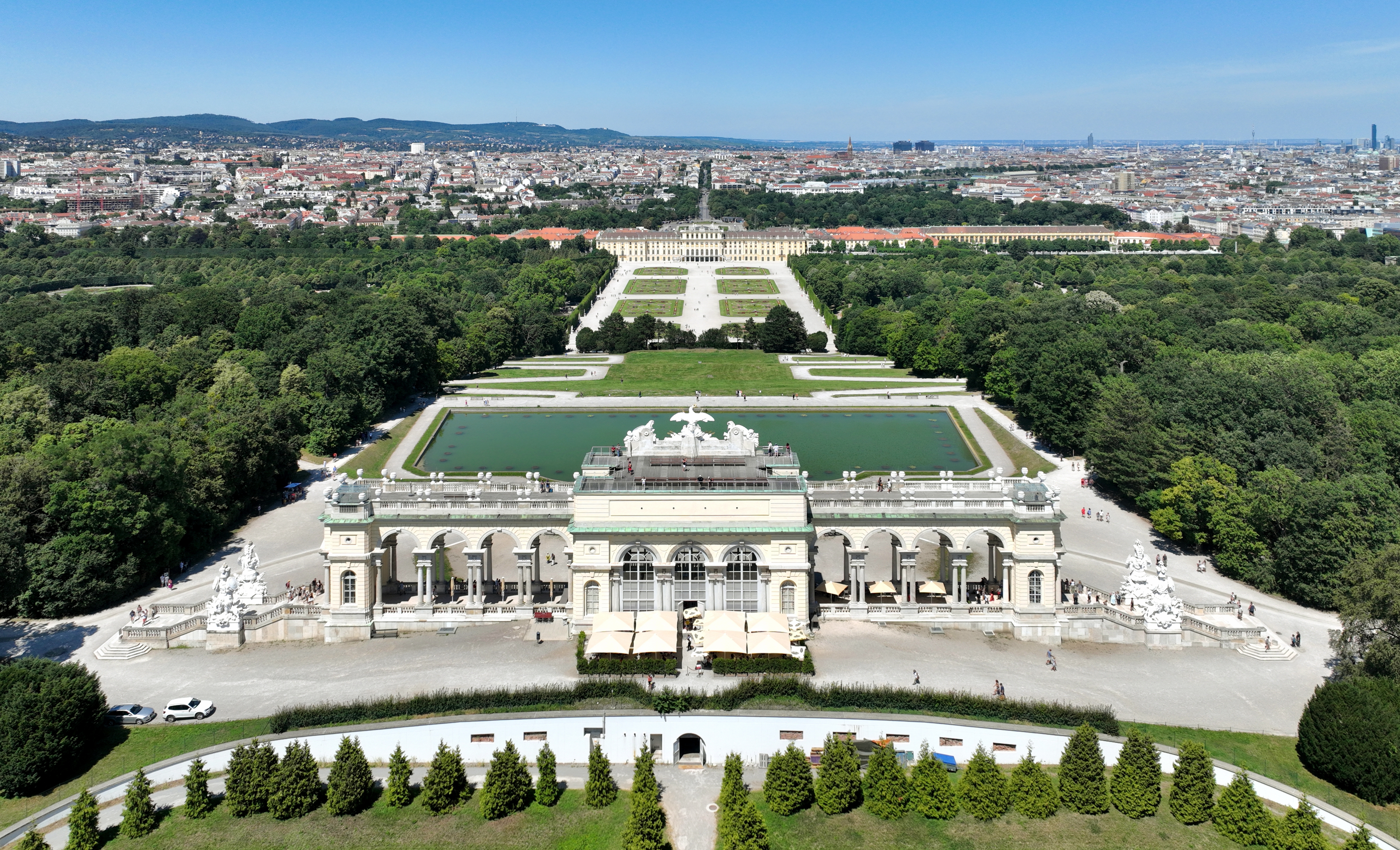
Palace complex with the Gloriette in the foreground and Vienna in the background.

The sculpted garden space between the palace and the Neptune Fountain is called the Great Parterre. In 1695, Jean Trehet, a disciple of André Le Nôtre, planned the French garden.

The complex includes many noteworthy staple luxuries of European palaces of the time, including the Tiergarten, an orangerie erected around 1755, and a palm house (replacing, by 1882, around ten earlier and smaller glass houses in the western part of the park).

The area called Meidlinger Vertiefung (Engl.: depression of Meidling) to the west of the palace was turned into a play area and drill ground for the children of the Habsburgs in the 19th century. At this time it was common to use parks for the military education of young princes. Whereas the miniature bastion, which was built for this purpose, does not exist anymore, the garden pavilion that was used as shelter still does. It was turned into a café in 1927 and is known as Landtmann's Jausen Station since 2013.

At the outmost western edge, a botanical garden going back to an earlier arboretum was re-arranged in 1828, when the Old Palm House was built.

=== Gloriette ===
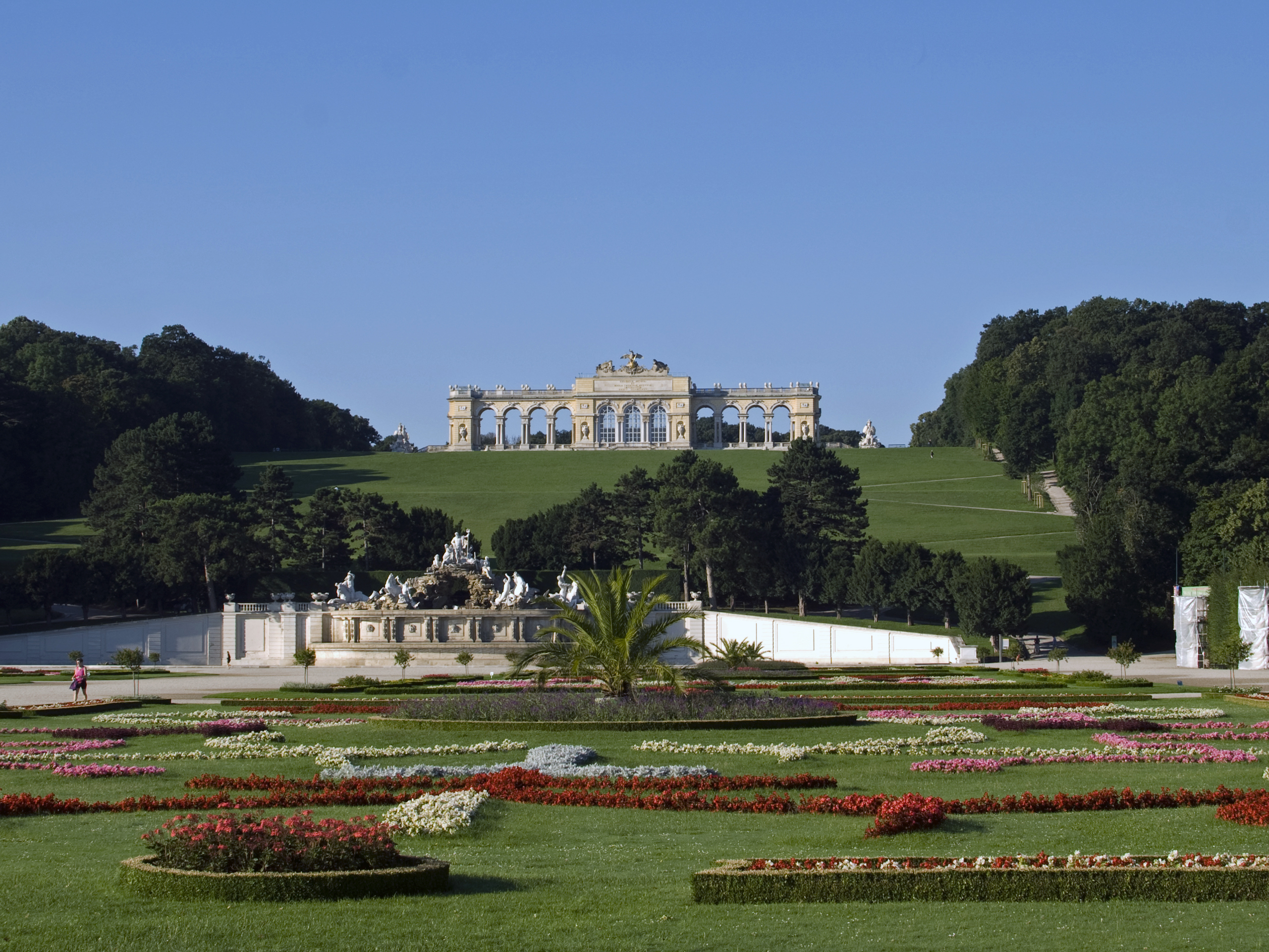
Gloriette, the Neptune Fountain and Great Parterre.

The garden axis points towards a 60-metre-high (200 ft) hill, which since 1775 has been crowned by the Gloriette structure.

Maria Theresa decided the Gloriette should be designed to glorify Habsburg power and the Just War (a war that would be carried out of "necessity" and lead to peace), and thereby ordered the builders to recycle "otherwise useless stone" which was left from the near demolition of Schloss Neugebäude.

=== Roman Ruin ===
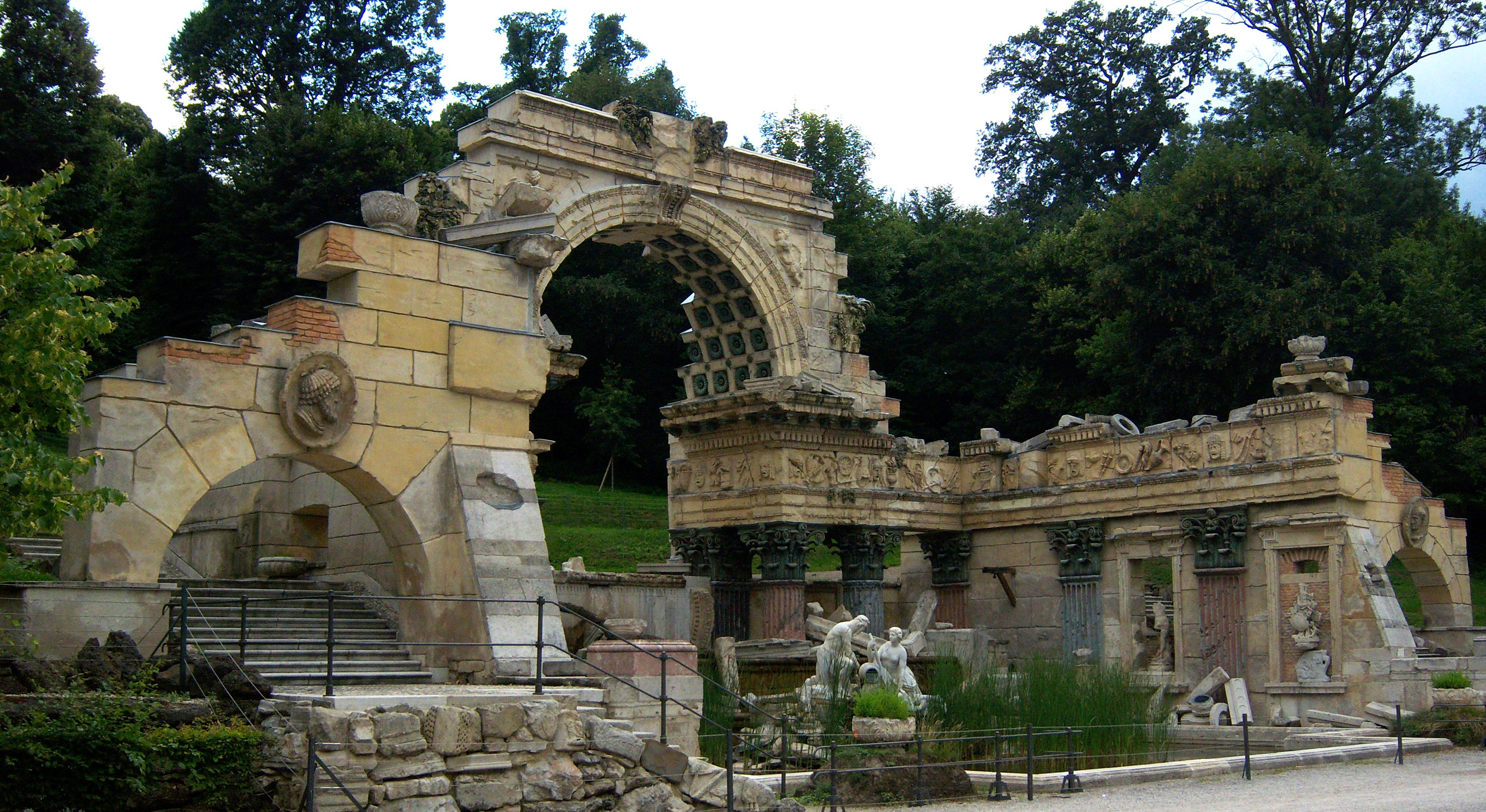
"Roman Ruin" at Schönbrunn

Originally known as the Ruin of Carthage, the Roman Ruin is a set of follies that was designed by the architect Johann Ferdinand Hetzendorf von Hohenberg, and erected as an entirely new architectural feature in 1778.

The fashion for picturesque ruin that became widespread with the rise of the Romantic movement soon after the middle of the 18th century symbolized both the decline of once great powers and the preservation of the remains of a heroic past. The Roman Ruin consists of a rectangular pool enclosed by a massive arch with lateral walls, evoking the impression of an ancient edifice slowly crumbling into the ground.

== Modern activities at Schönbrunn ==
Schönbrunn is Vienna's most popular tourist destination, and was attended by almost 4 million visitors in 2017. The larger Schönbrunn complex with Tiergarten Schönbrunn, Palmenhaus, Wüstenhaus, the Wagenburg, and the Schoenbrunn Palace Concerts was visited by five million people in 2009.

Tours of the grounds are sold to tourists, and concerts are put on featuring classical music. The Vienna Philharmonic performs in the gardens for the Summer Night Concert Schönbrunn, annually since 2004.

=== Schönbrunn Palace Orchestra ===
Schönbrunn Palace concerts are performed by the Schönbrunn Palace Orchestra, founded in 1997. Chief opera conductor Maestro Guido Mancusi has led the Orchestra since 1998. He also founded the Chamber Opera program as part of the Schönbrunn Palace concert series.

In Vienna, they offer daily concerts at the original location of the world-famous contest between Mozart & Salieri (1786). They have a wealth of experience working with singers and ballet dancers. The Orchestra regularly tours around the world.

=== Film and television productions ===
The gardens and palace have been the location for many films and television productions including such productions as the Sissi trilogy in the 1950s, A Breath of Scandal with Sophia Loren, and also briefly in the Bond movie The Living Daylights when Bond (Timothy Dalton) and Kara are riding through the palace garden; the palace is also seen during the end credits. The comedy The Great Race was filmed there in 1965. Jackie Chan shot scenes for Armour of God on the grounds. The 2006 television drama The Crown Prince starring Max von Thun as Crown Prince Rudolf and Klaus Maria Brandauer as Kaiser Franz-Josef was filmed there.

The Austrian television series, Kommissar Rex has shot several episodes there. In the Kuroshitsuji episode 2, "His Butler, Omnipotent", Sebastian Michaelis tells his master that he was a guest at the Schönbrunn Palace soirees before his contract was sealed with Ciel as he teaches the young master how to dance. Dutch violinist André Rieu and the Johann Strauss Orchestra, along with the Opera Babes used it as the backdrop for a version of the European Anthem, "Ode to Joy" in 2003.

In the third leg of The Amazing Race 4, the palace hosted a Fast Forward task where one team had to carry trays of champagne glasses across a ballroom floor of waltzing couples. In the sixth leg of The Amazing Race 23, teams had to race through the garden's maze and search for the Pit Stop located at the Gloriette.

== Gallery ==
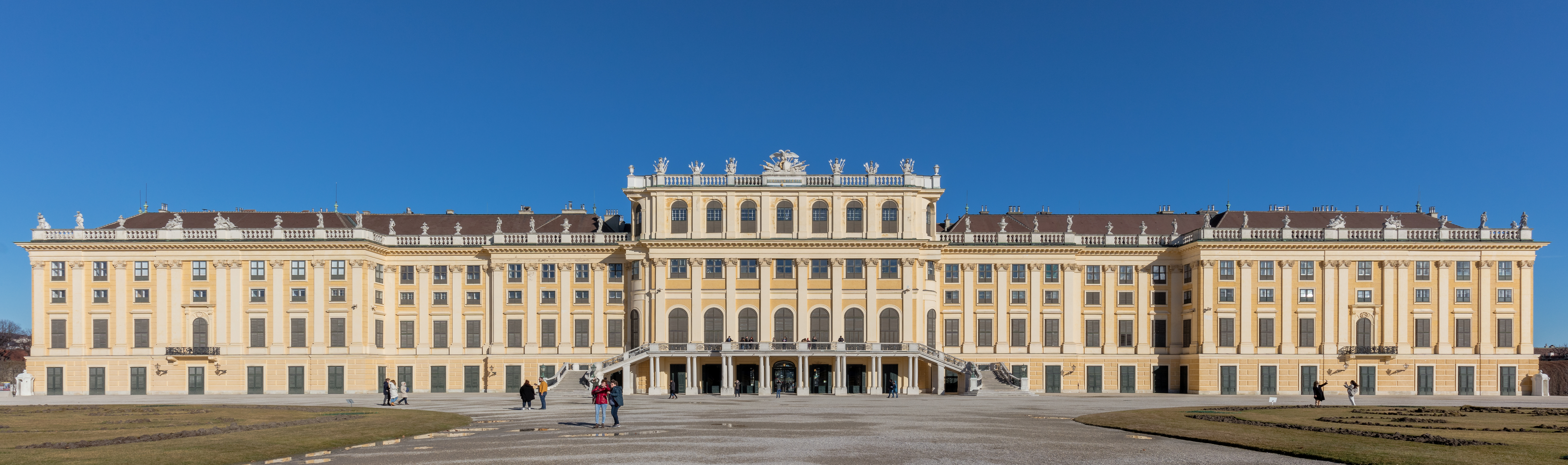
Panorama of Schönbrunn main facade
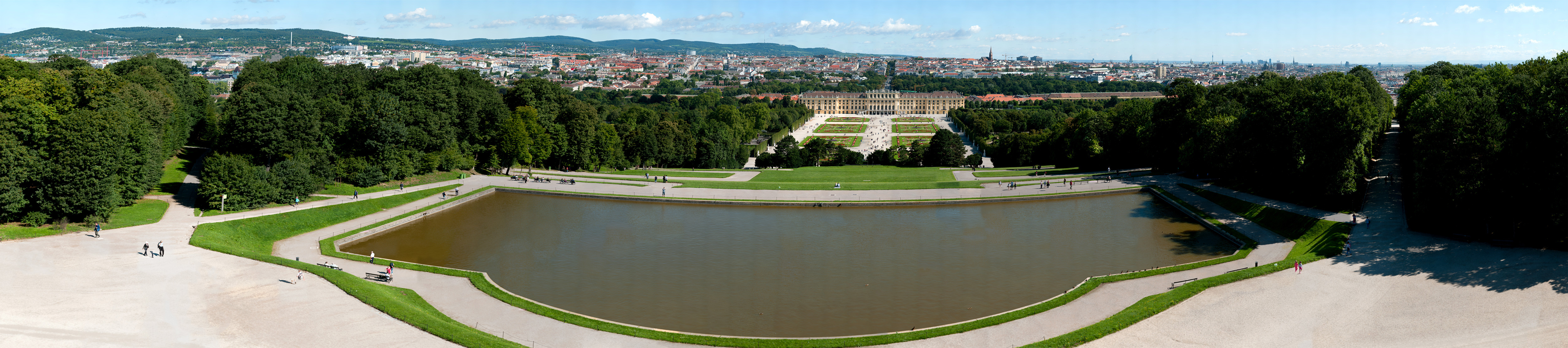
Panorama of Schönbrunn from the Gloriette, with Vienna in background
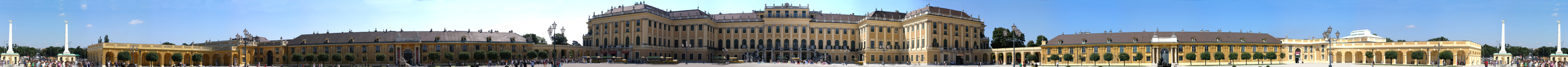
Panorama of the entrance court
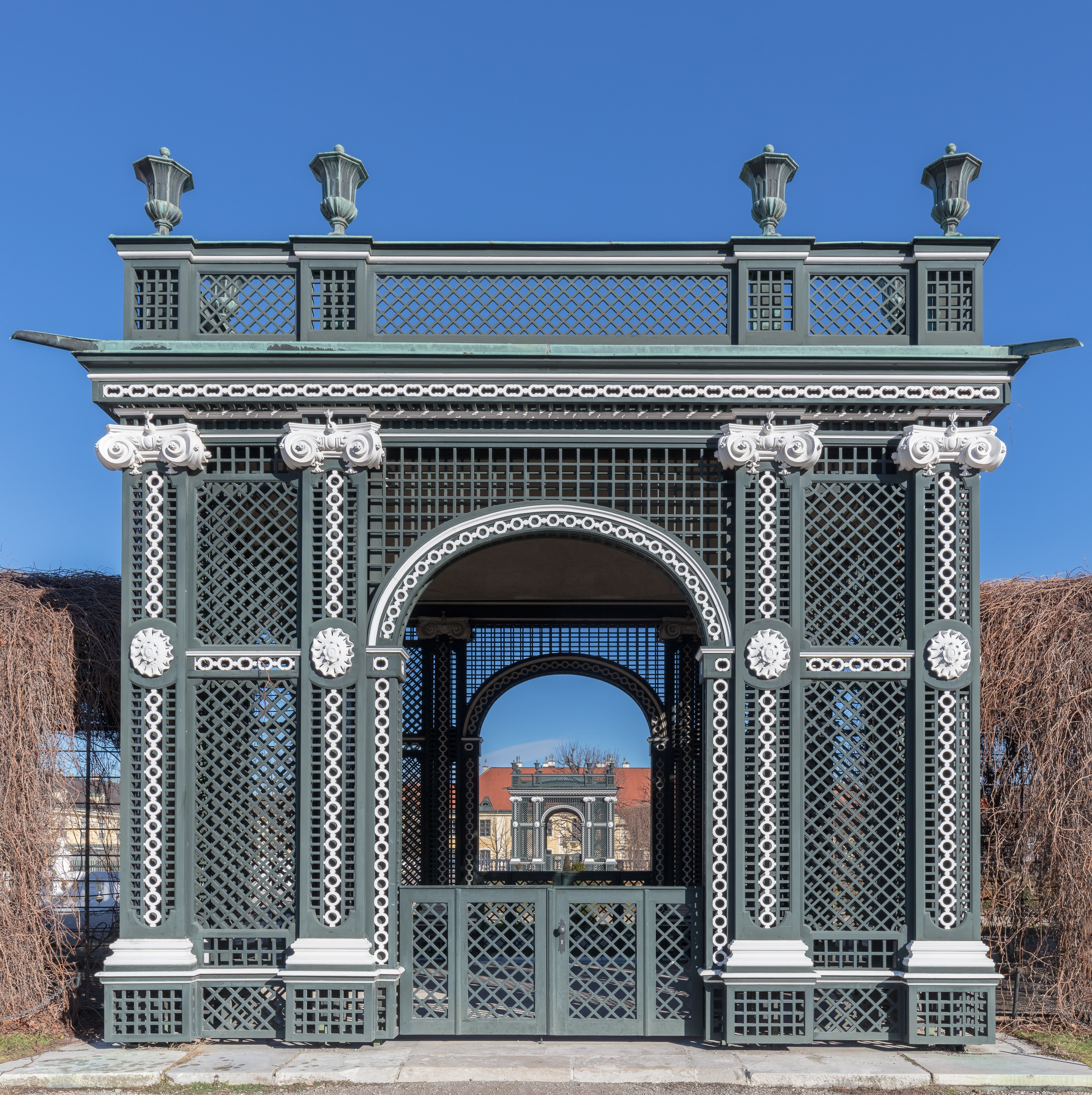
A garden pavilion, Kammergarten pavilion

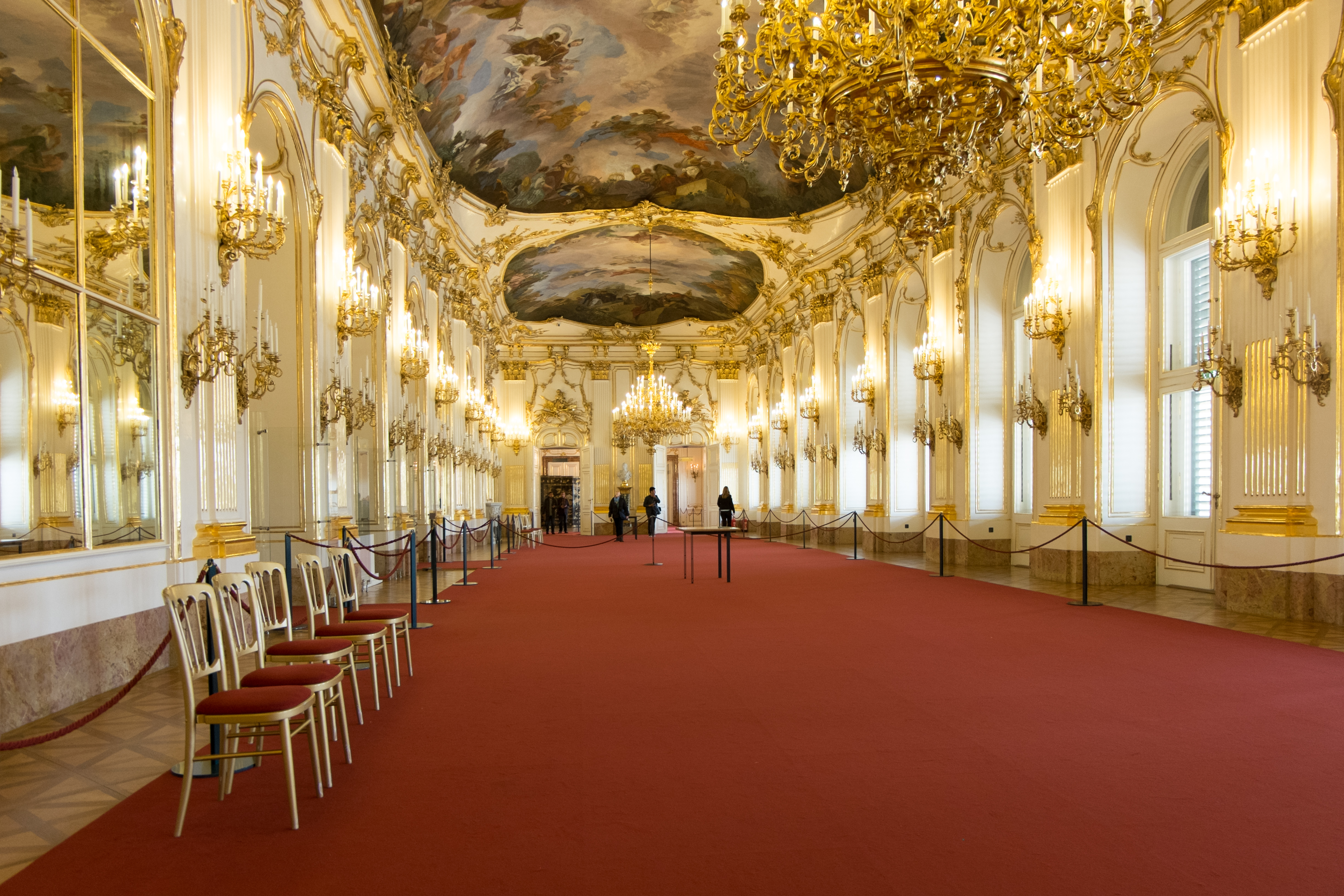
Great Gallery

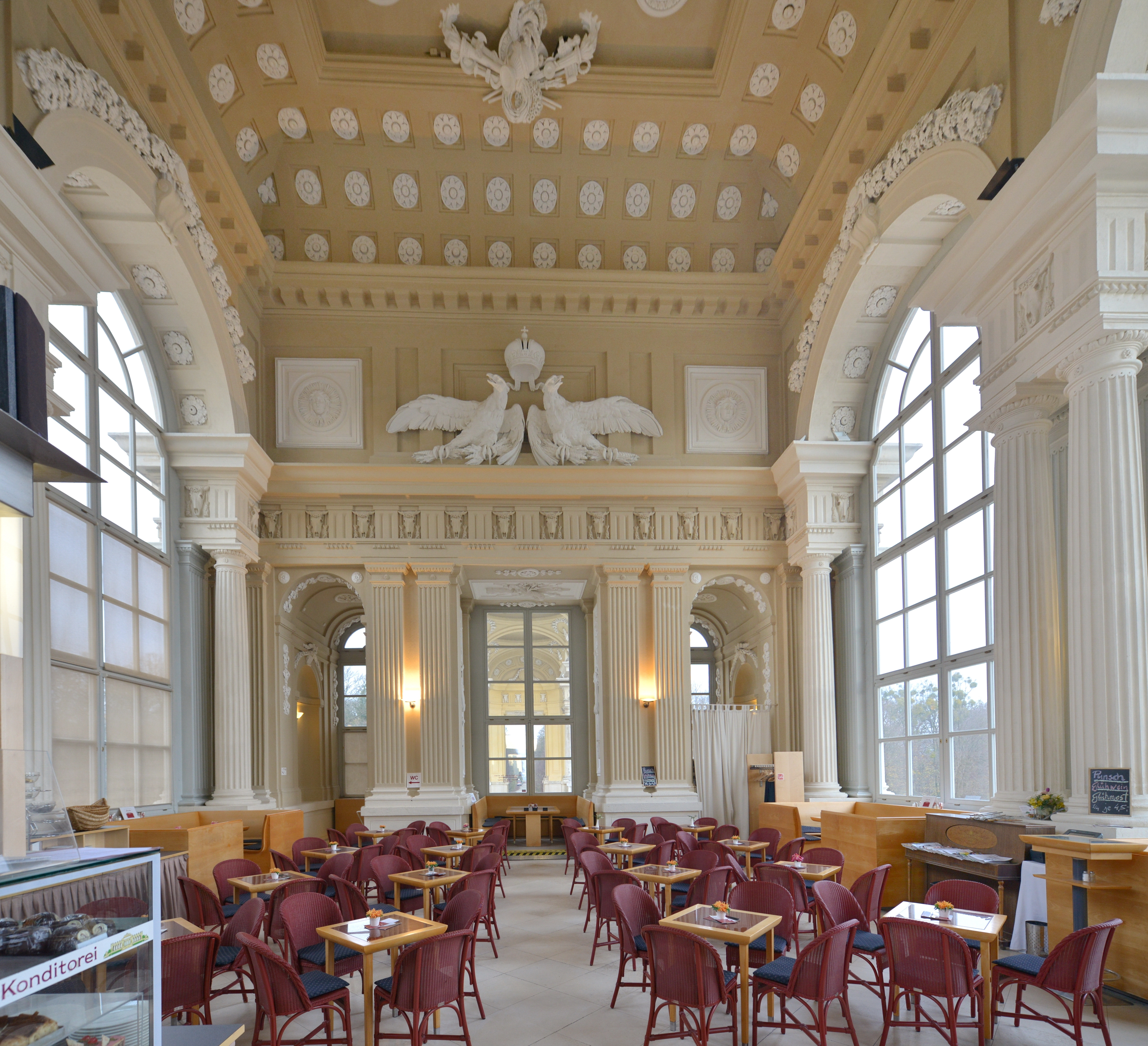
Cafe Gloriette Schönbrunn

Gloriette in the gardens

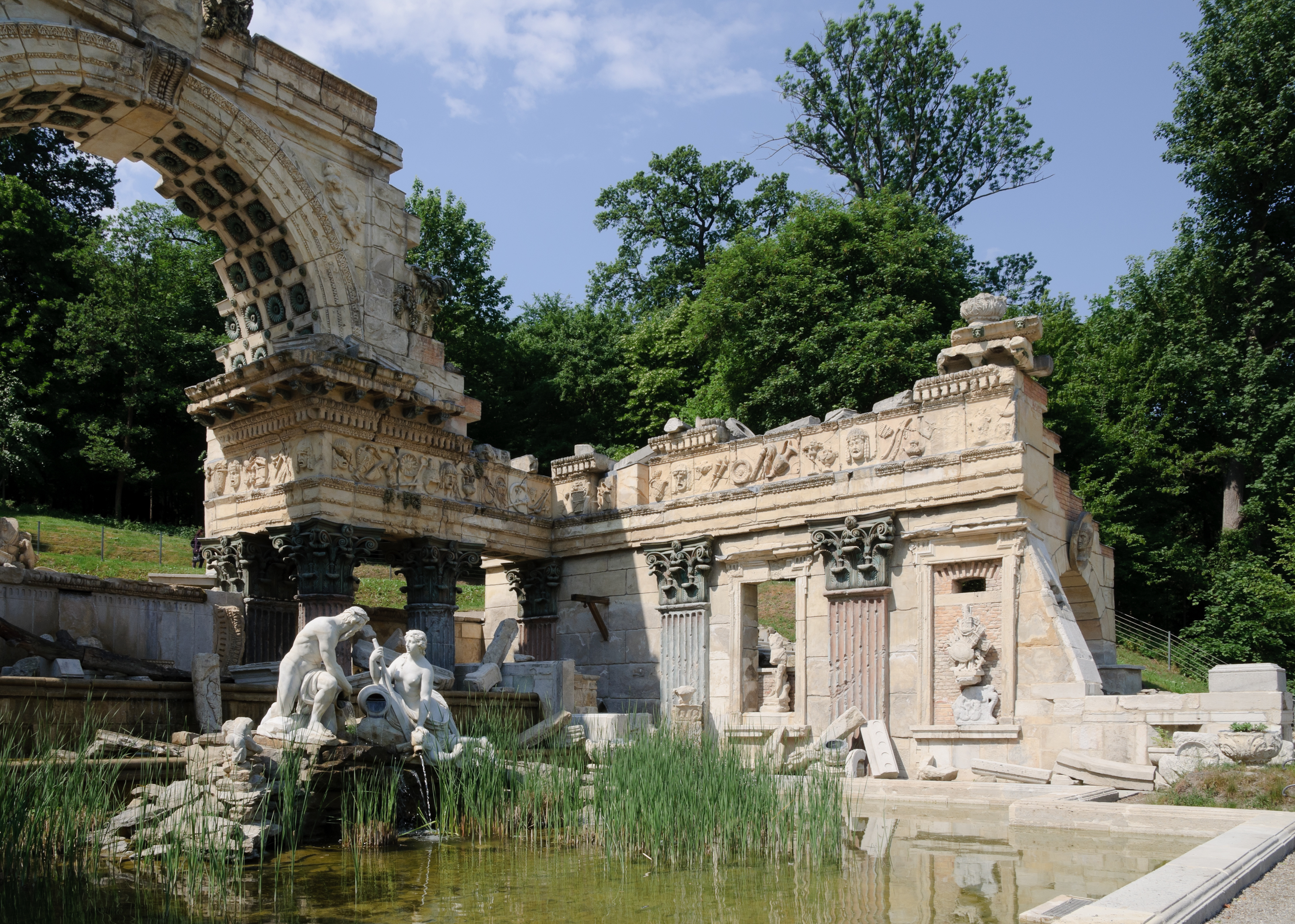
The Roman Ruin.

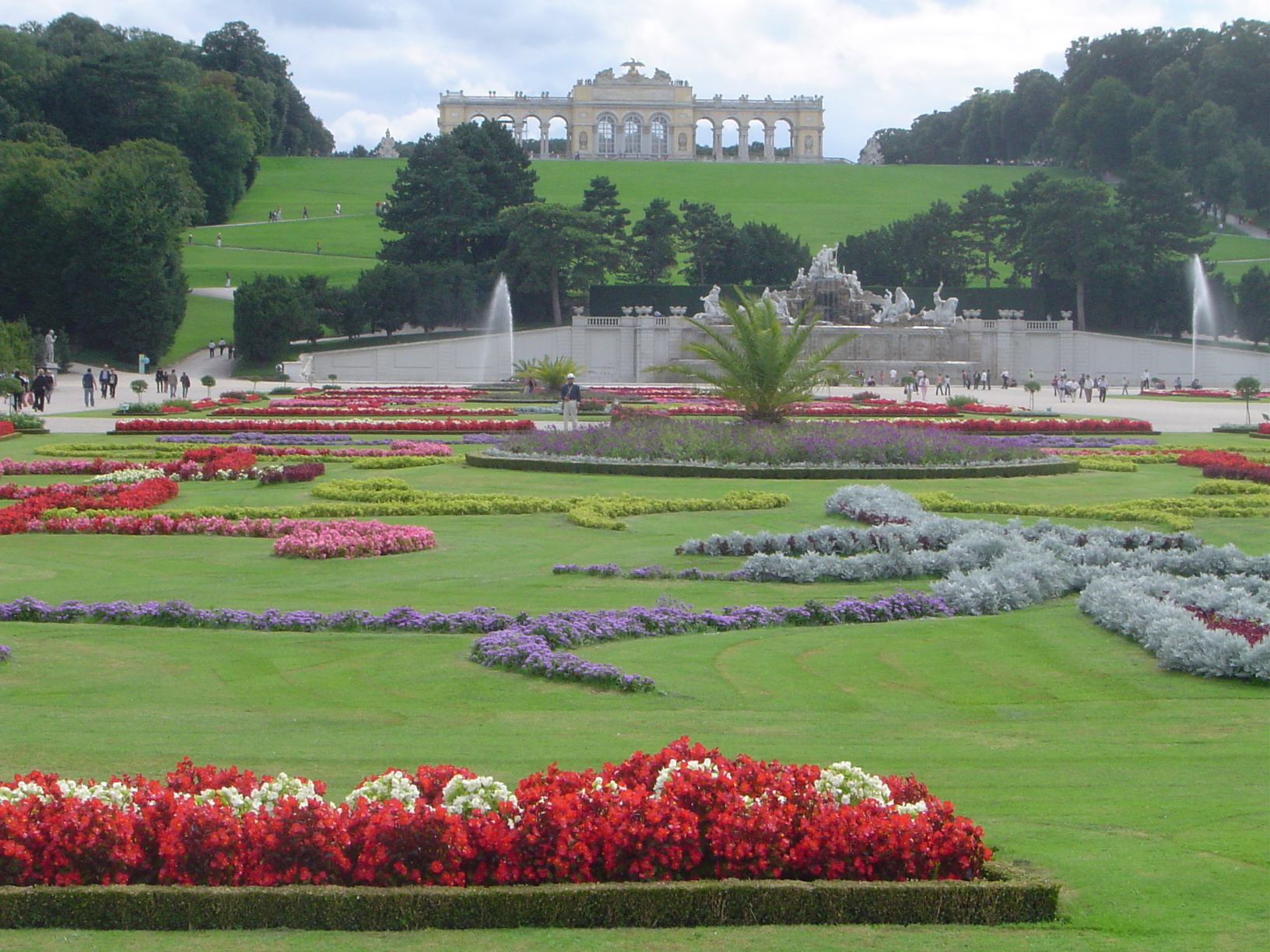
View from Great Parterre towards the Gloriette
(app. towards South).

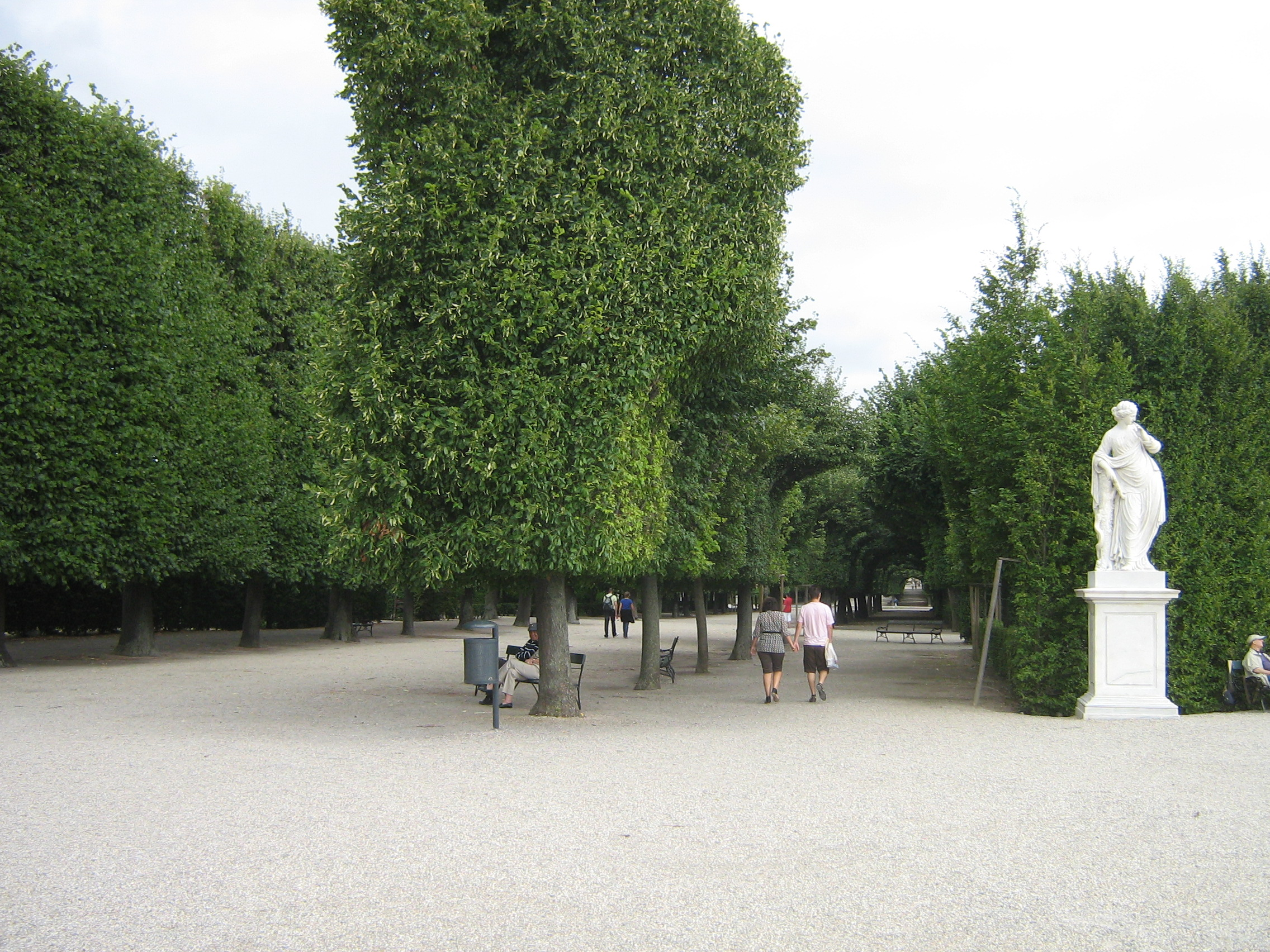
View of the gardens

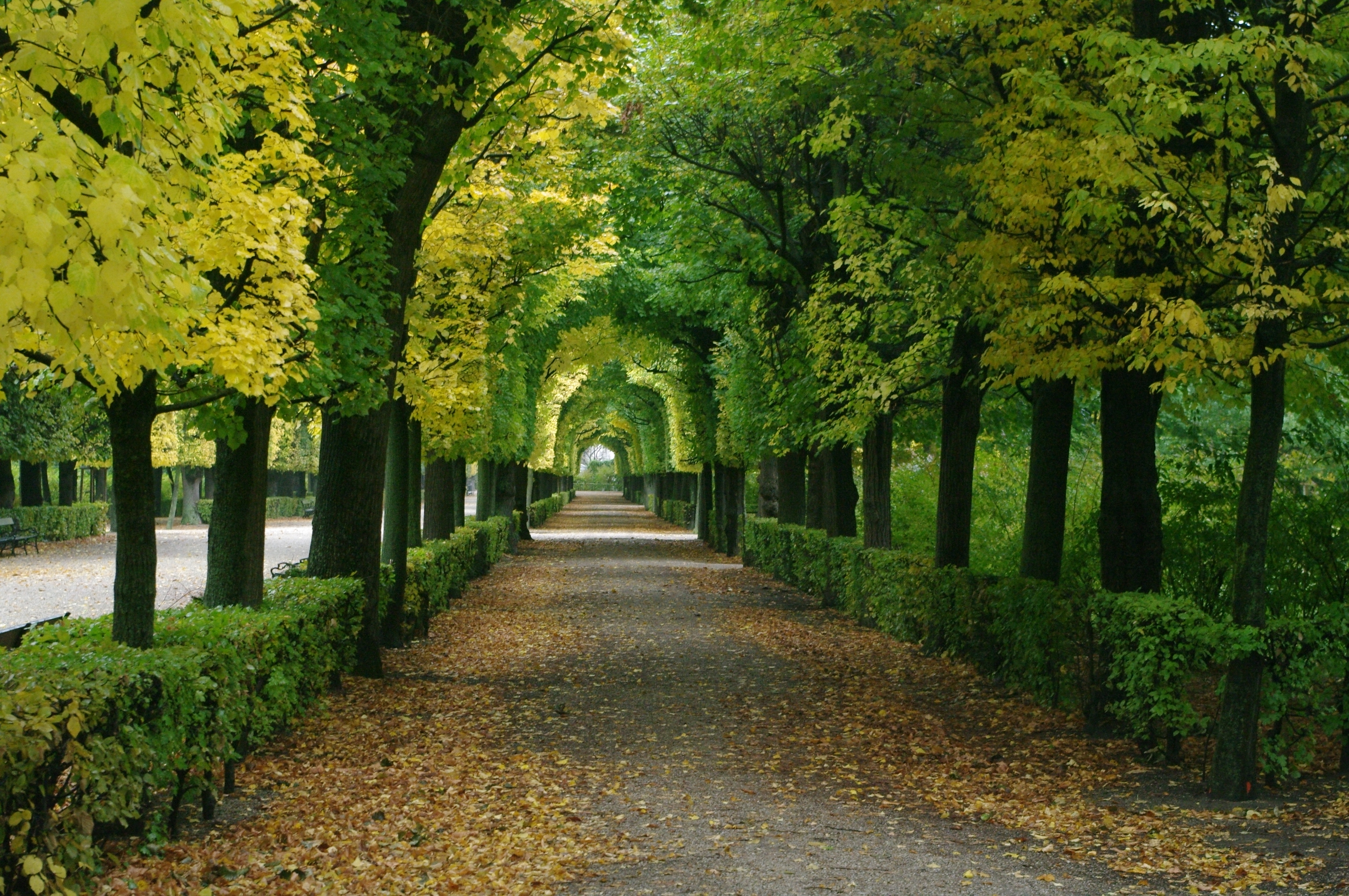
View of the gardens in autumn

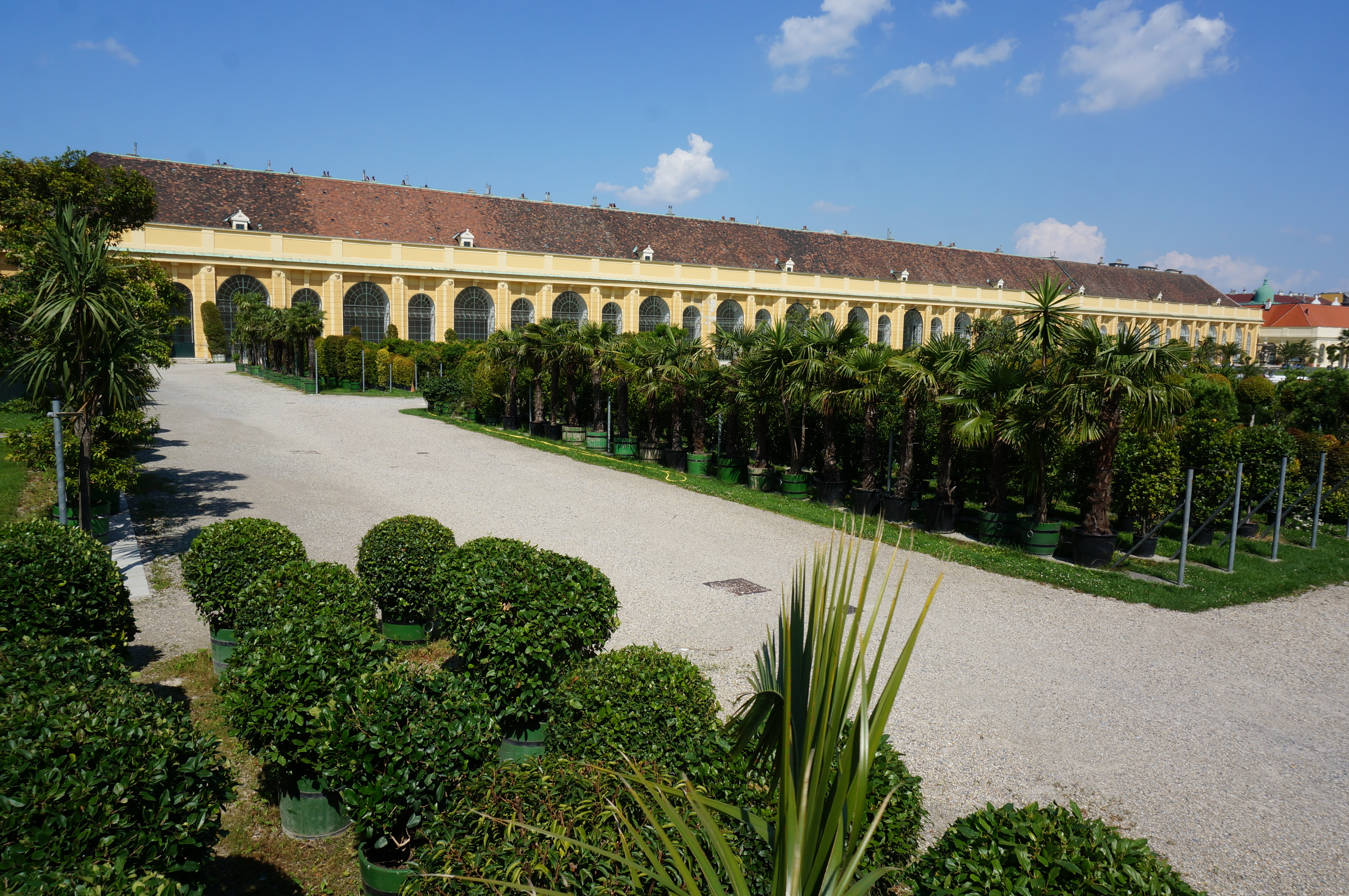
Orangery, in NE part of the gardens.

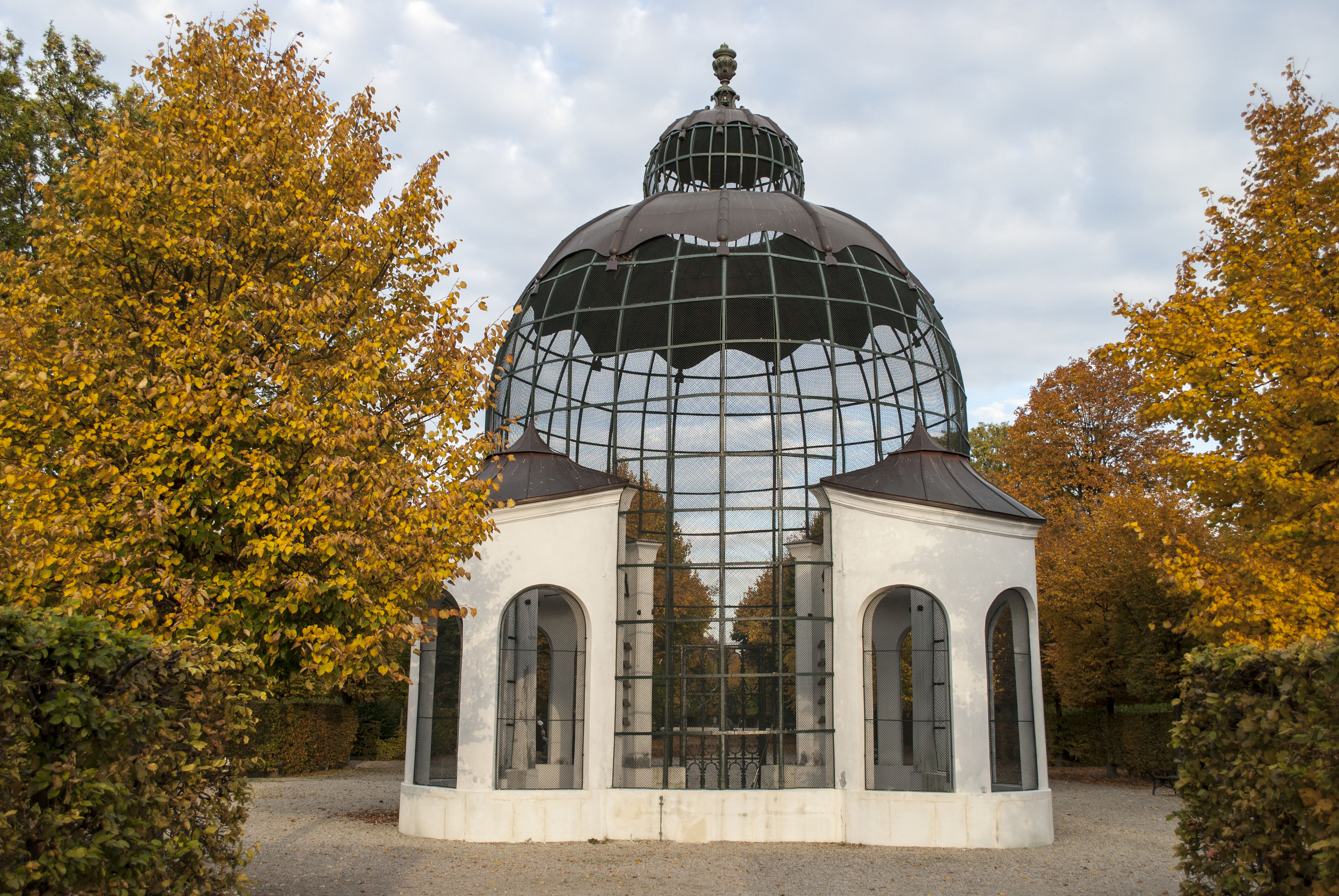
Columbary

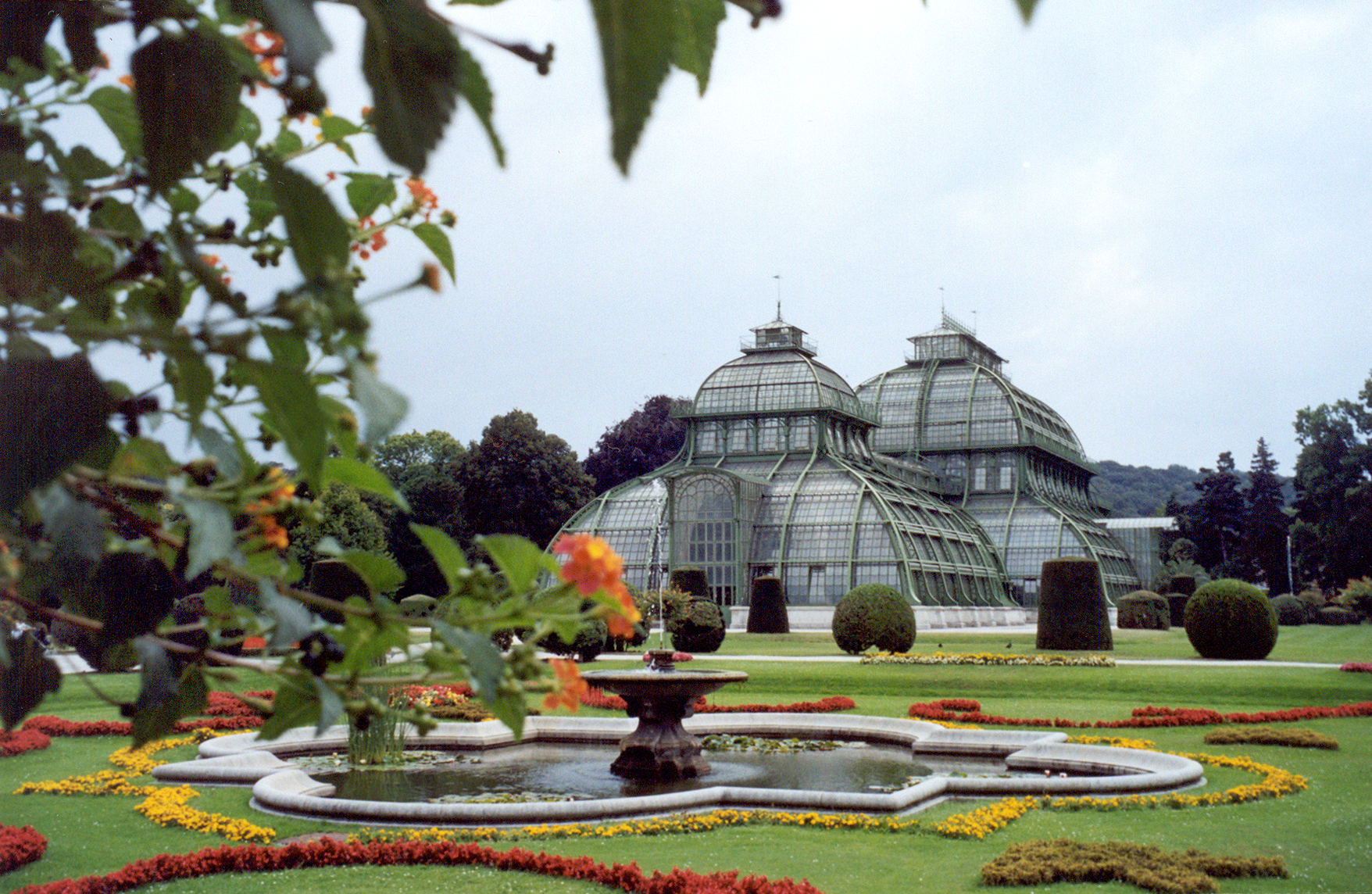
Palm pavilion in western part of the gardens

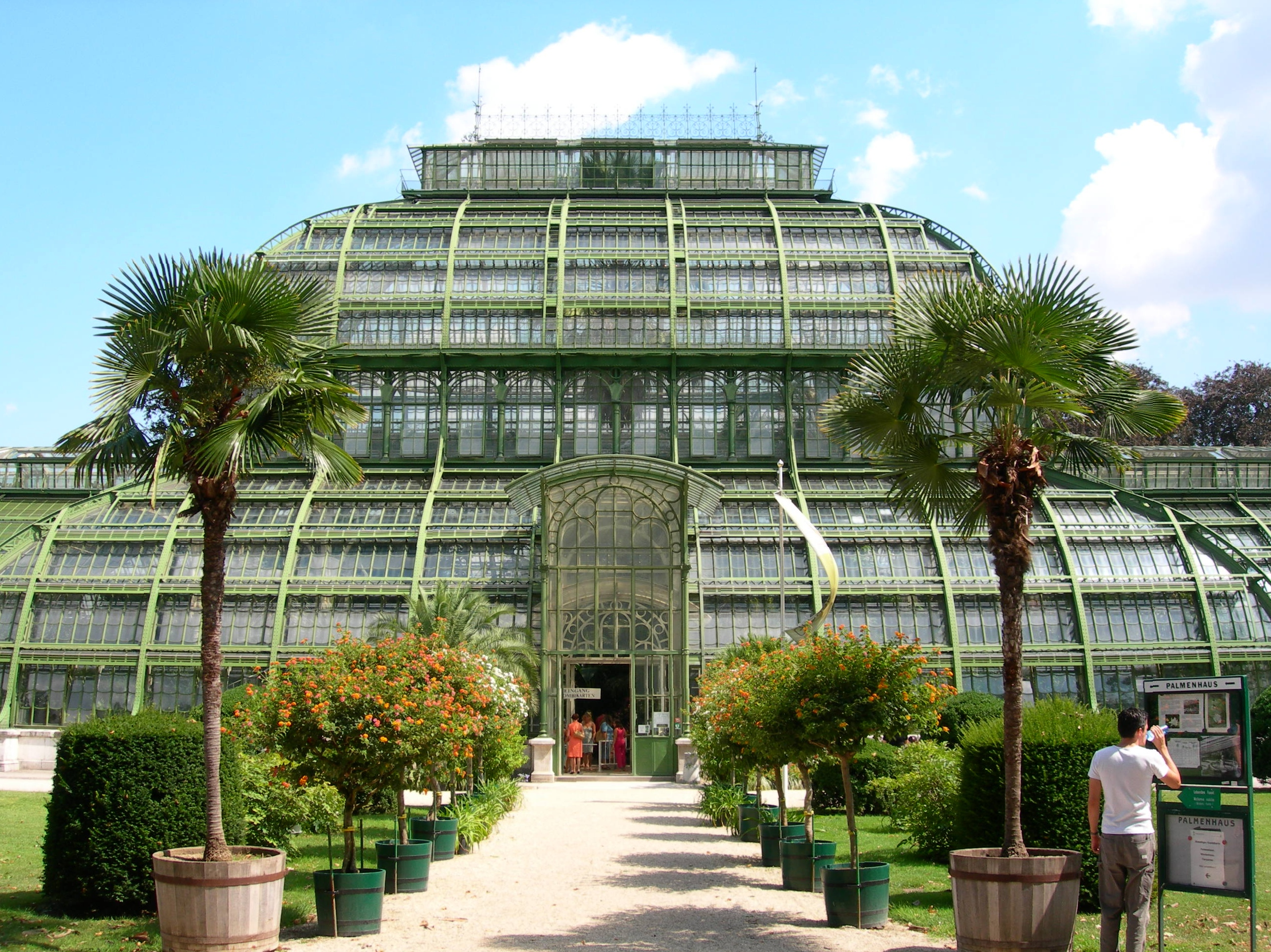
The Palm House

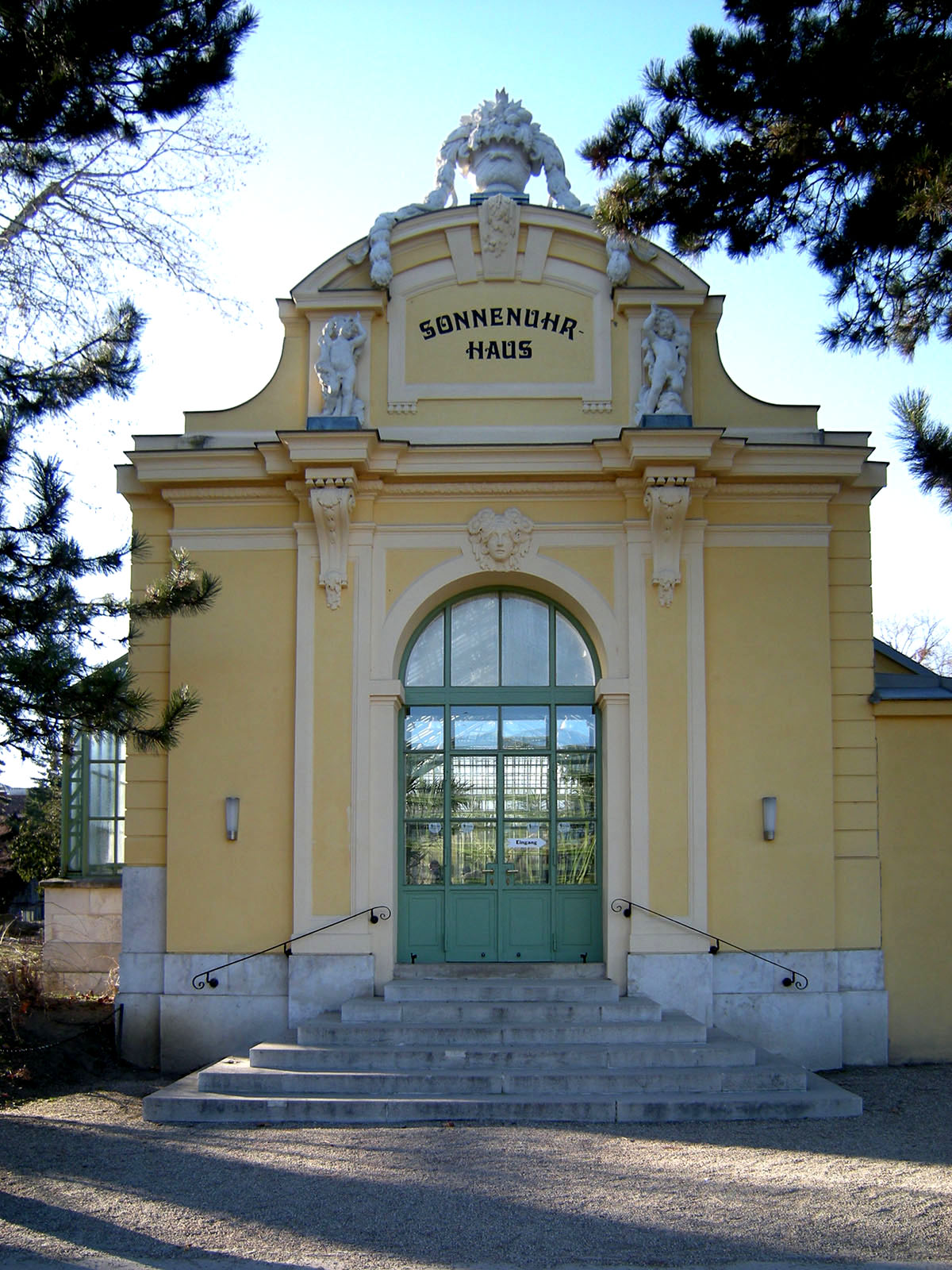
Sundial House

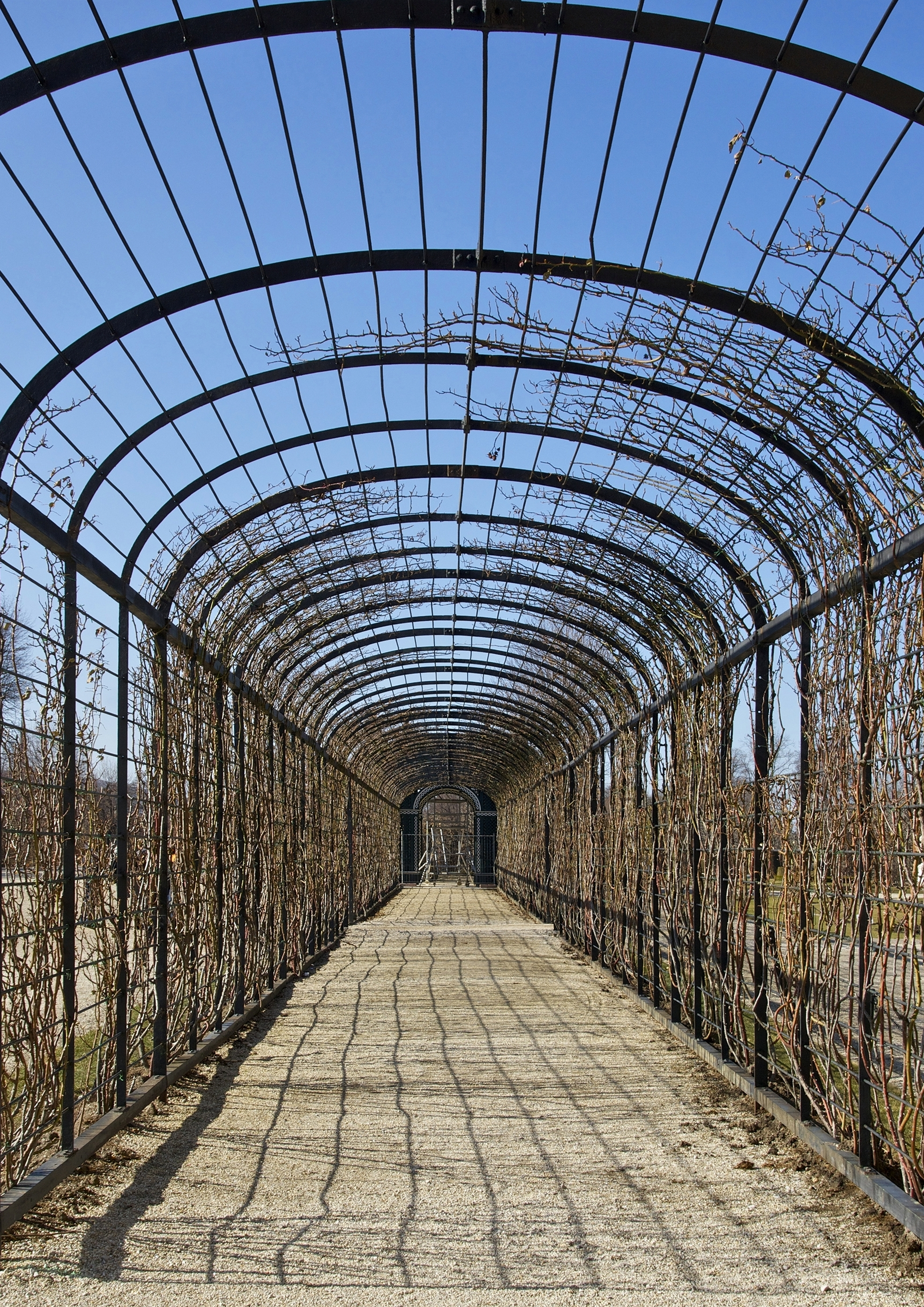
Privy garden in winter

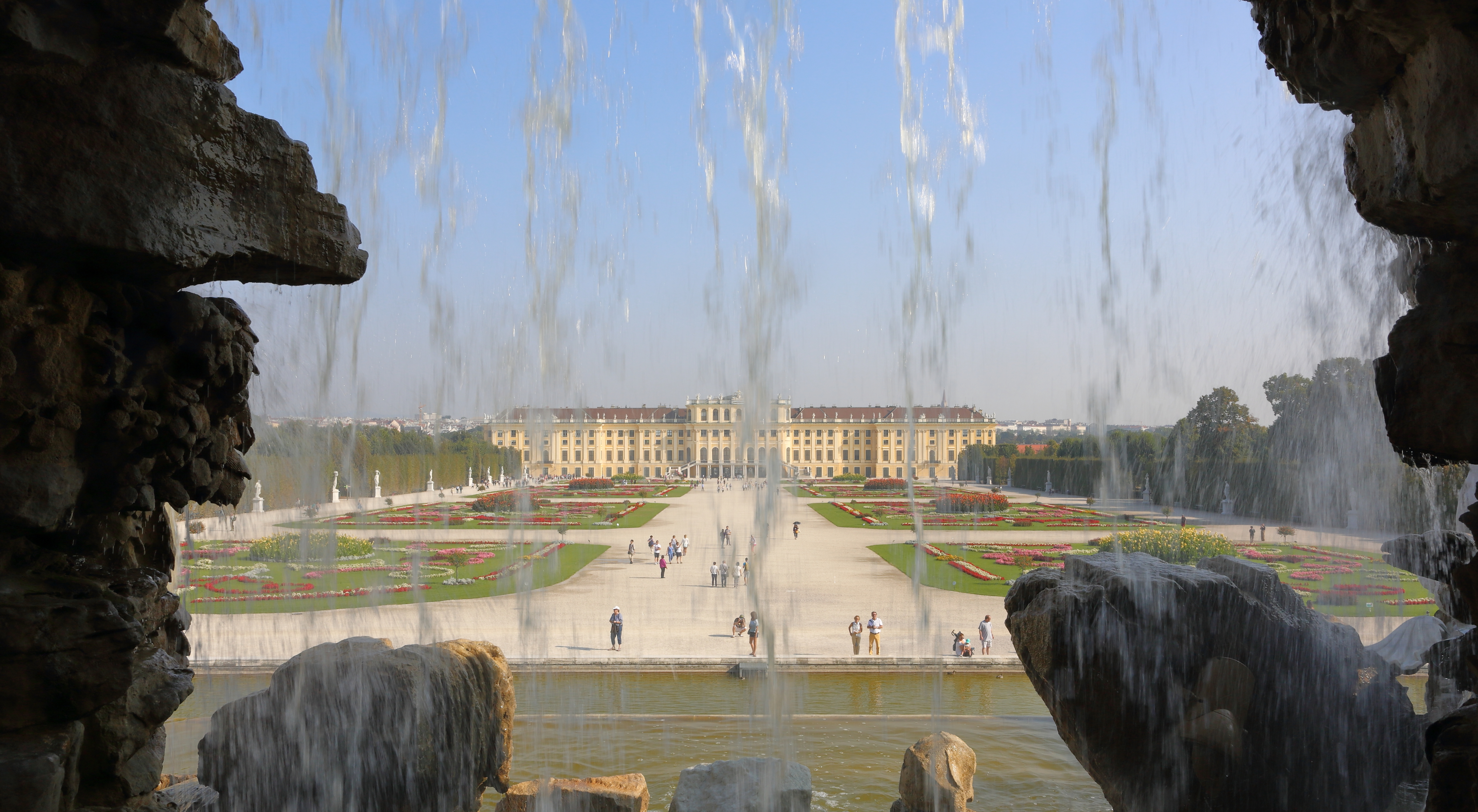
Schönbrunn seen through Neptune Fountain

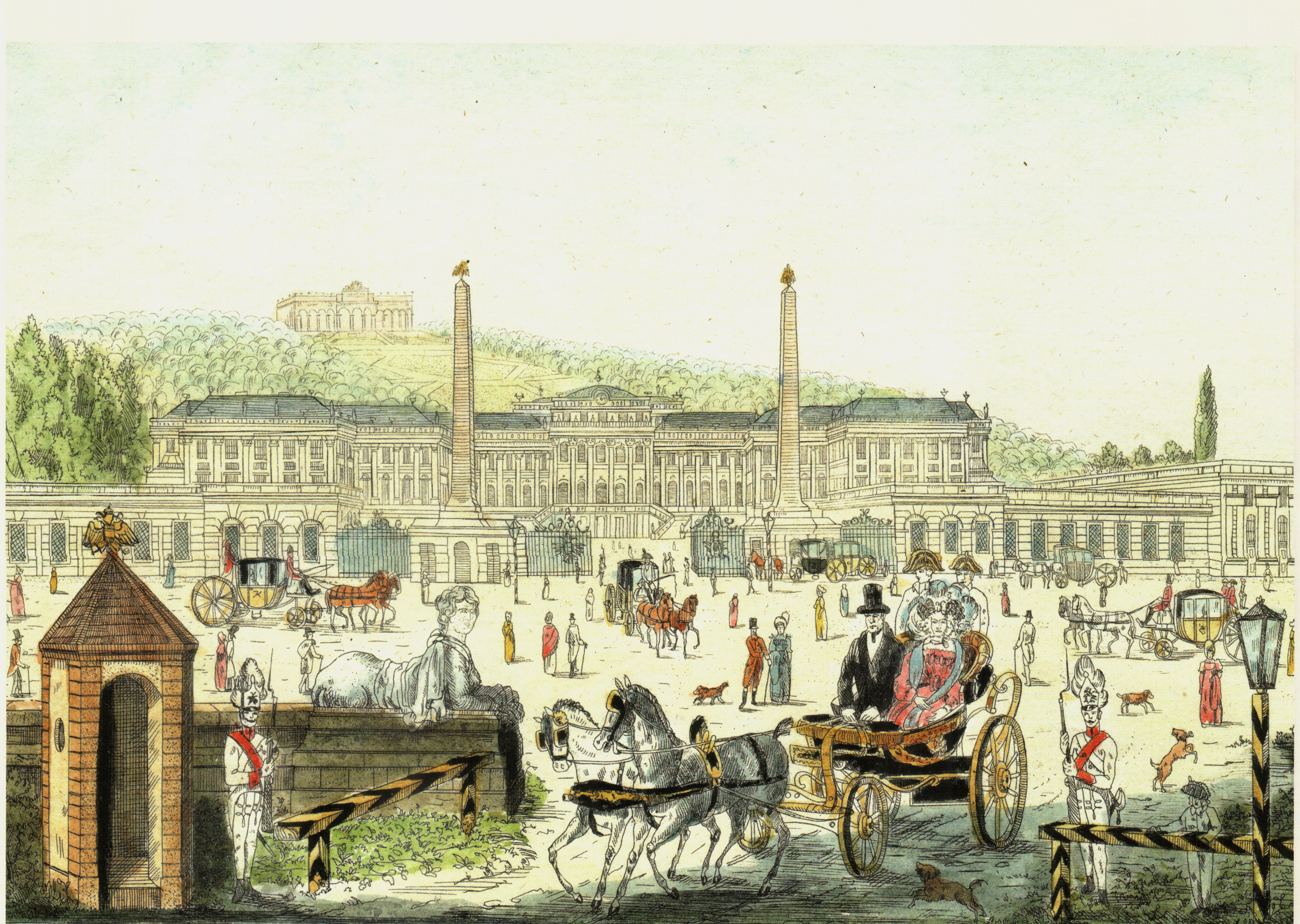
Schönbrunn

== The Schönbrunn Palace silver coin ==
The palace was selected as the main motif of a high value commemorative coin: the Austrian 10-euro The Palace of Schönbrunn silver coin, minted on 8 October 2003. The obverse shows the central part of the frontage of the palace behind one of the great fountains in the open space.

== See also ==
- Imperial Carriage Museum
- Chinese Cabinets in Schönbrunn Palace
- Tiergarten Schönbrunn, the zoo in the palace gardens that claims to be the oldest one in the world
- Gloriette
- List of Baroque residences
- List of World Heritage Sites in Austria
