= Sebastian Holecek =

Austrian operatic baritone

Sebastian Holecek (born 27 March 1964) is an Austrian operatic baritone. He has been part of the ensemble of the Vienna Volksoper since 2006.

== Leben und Werk ==
Born in Vienna, Holecek is the son of the Viennese singer and folk artist Heinz Holecek (1938-2012) and met a number of famous artists at a young age who frequented his parents' home, including Cesare Siepi, Luchino Visconti and Franco Zeffirelli. As a teenager, he was one of the most enthusiastic standing-room visitors to the Vienna State Opera. At a school event he sang an aria from Cornelius' The Barber of Bagdad, but did not know that his father had brought colleagues Oskar Czerwenka and Eberhard Waechter. Their summary: "He does have a voice, he just can't sing at all. But he has a great presence. He belongs on stage!" So it came about that Holecek followed in his father's footsteps and studied singing at the University of Music and Performing Arts Vienna and in Italy.

Already during his studies he gave guest performances in Holland, Germany, Switzerland and Austria. In 1990 he became an ensemble member at the Gärtnerplatztheater in Munich, where he sang Figaro, Don Giovanni and Harlequin (in Ariadne auf Naxos), among others. Engagements followed at major opera houses worldwide, including the Staatsoper Unter den Linden in Berlin, the Bayerische Staatsoper in Munich and the Royal Opera House Covent Garden in London, as well as Paris, New York, Cape Town, Monte Carlo, Santiago de Chile, Madrid, Barcelona, Amsterdam, St. Gallen, Turin, Naples, Rome, Düsseldorf, Saarbrücken and Stuttgart, and the Bregenz Festival. He made his debut at the Vienna State Opera in October 1991 with his longstanding parade role, Papageno in the magic flute by Schikaneder and Mozart. So far he has performed this role 24 times at the Haus am Ring. Parallel to his Munich engagement, he has also sung regularly at the Vienna Volksoper.

Since the 2006/2007 season Sebastian Holecek has been a member of the ensemble of the Vienna Volksoper. Holecek has a broad repertoire ranging from Mozart (Figaro, Giovanni, Masetto, Papageno and Sprecher) to the present. In the German repertoire he sings Pizzaro and Don Fernando in Beethoven's Fidelio, Peter in Humperdinck's Hänsel und Gretel, Kaspar in Weber's Freischütz, the Heerrufer in Wagner's Lohengrin, Johannes Freudhofer in Kienzl's Der Evangelimann and Moruccio in d'Albert's Tiefland. In Italian he succeeded as Schaunard in La Bohème, as Scarpia in Tosca and as Fléville in Andrea Chénier. His Verdi roles include Germont in La traviata, Christian in Un ballo in maschera and Marullo in Rigoletto, and his Strauss roles include, in addition to Harlequin, Jochanaan in Salome and Count Dominik in Arabella. Other important roles include Escamillo in Bizet's Carmen, the title roles in the modern operas Il prigioniero (by Dallapiccola) and Gesualdo (by Alfred Schnittke), as well as the Barak in Ferruccio Busoni's Turandot and the Theseus in Benjamin Britten's A Midsummer Night's Dream. Holecek also enjoys singing operetta and has been seen and heard as Danilo in Lustige Witwe, as Eisenstein in Die Fledermaus and as Homonay in Der Zigeunerbaron, among others. In 2014/2015 he gave the Ghost Messenger in the premiere of Die Frau ohne Schatten at the Bavarian State Opera.

As a concert singer, Holecek has performed at the Musikverein and Konzerthaus in Vienna, as well as at Carnegie Hall in New York. In August 2015, he made his debut at the Salzburg Festival as Don Fernando in a Fidelio new production by Claus Guth and Franz Welser-Möst at the Großes Festspielhaus. Holecek also sang this role at the Vienna State Opera in June 2015.

Holecek's daughter Jamileh is a scenic designer, his son Nicholas performed as an extra in the Volksoper when he was only 9 years old.

== Awards ==
- 2013: Österreichischer Musiktheaterpreis for the rolle of Jochanaan (in Wilde/Strauss' Salome), Volksoper Wien
