= Heinz Holecek =

Austrian bass-baritone

Heinz "Honzo" Holecek (13 April 1938 – 13 April 2012) was an Austrian bass-baritone, known as an opera and operetta singer as well as a lied interpreter, was also a Viennese "all-round artist" – actor, parodist, and entertainer.

== Career ==
Born in Vienna, Holecek completed his vocal training at the Music and Arts University of the City of Vienna, and then studied Holecek studied at the University of Music and Performing Arts Vienna, where his teachers included Elisabeth Radó. He made his debut in 1960 at the Volksoper as Papageno in Mozart's Die Zauberflöte. His first performance at the Vienna State Opera was the same role in 1962, and from 1965 he performed at both houses. Holecek made guest appearances at opera houses in Paris, Barcelona, Rome, Stockholm, Stuttgart, Zürich, Munich, Hamburg, Berlin, and also at the Bregenz Festival.

In 1977, he was awarded the title Kammersänger and in 2000 he was awarded the Austrian Cross of Honour for Science and Art I Class.

=== Work ===
Holecek interpreted many operetta roles. In Die Fledermaus by Johann Strauss, he played the roles of Falke, Frank and Frosch. He was also active as artistic director and as director at the summer festival at the Schallaburg and at the Kamptaler Festspiele. In addition, he participated in a large number of sound recordings as well as television productions and had numerous TV shows of his own. His parodies were very popular with the audience.

Holecek also devoted himself to the cultivation of the Wienerlied. Together with Heinz Zednik and the Philharmonia-Schrammeln as well as with the Wiener Schrammel Ensemble he made several CD recordings. Tours with Viennese songs took him to Los Angeles, Montreal, Moscow, and Japan. He was also an honorary board member of the Vienna Animal Protection Society.

Holecek died in April 2012 on his 74th birthday, having been in a coma since a collapse in February. He was buried on 27 April 2012 at the Neustifter Friedhof (1-10-7) in Vienna.

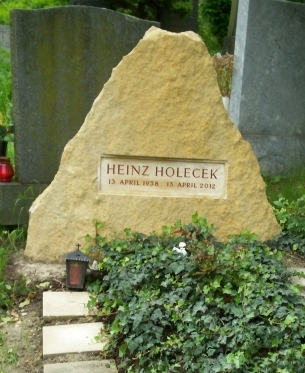
Heinz Holecek gravesite

Holecek died in Vienna at the age of 74.

His son Sebastian Holecek also became a singer and has been a member of the ensemble of the Vienna Volksoper since 2006.

== Honours ==
- 1977: Appointment as Kammersänger
- 2000: Österreichisches Ehrenkreuz für Wissenschaft und Kunst I. Klasse
- 2001: Ehrenmedaille der Bundeshauptstadt Wien in Gold
- Benennung des Heinz-Holecek-Platzes in Währing

== Recordings ==
- Friedrich Cerha: Baal, with Martha Mödl, Emily Rawlins, Margarethe Bence, Waldemar Kmentt, Heinz Holecek, conductor: Christoph von Dohnányi, Wiener Philharmoniker, Amadeo, live recording of the premiere, 1981
- Johann Strauß: Die Fledermaus, with Eberhard Wächter, Gundula Janowitz, Wolfgang Windgassen, Waldemar Kmentt, Heinz Holecek (Falke), Erich Kunz. Director: Otto Schenk. Conductor: Karl Böhm, Wiener Philharmoniker, televiosion film (1972)
