= Badische Staatskapelle =

Symphony orchestra based in Karlsruhe, Germany

The Badische Staatskapelle is a symphony orchestra based in Karlsruhe. The orchestra is affiliated with the Badisches Staatstheater (Baden State Theatre). The historical roots of the orchestra date back to 1662. The precursor ensemble was the Hofkapelle der Markgrafen von Baden-Durlach (Court Orchestra of the Margrave of Baden-Durlach). Early leaders of the orchestra included Giuseppe Beniventi (1712–1718), Casimir Schweizelsberger, Johann Philipp Käfer, and Johann Melchior Molter, who led the orchestra for 40 years.

== History ==
In 1733, the orchestra was disbanded during the conflicts with Poland. After the orchestra was re-established in Karlsruhe, Molter reapplied as leader of the orchestra in 1743 and served in the post until he died in 1765. After Molter's death, Giacinto Sciatti became Court Kapellmeister. Joseph Aloys Schmittbaur took over the leadership of the Badische Hofkapelle following the death in 1777 of Sciatti. During that period, Christian Franz Danner served as Kapellmeister. Later, the violinist and composer Johann Evangelist Brandl shared the directorship of the ensemble with Danner, and later became the sole Kapellmeister.

In the 19th century, Franz Danzi began as Hofkapellmeister in 1812. Josef Strauss succeeded Danzi and served in that capacity until 1863. The Bohemian composer and violinist Franz Pecháček was the leader of the orchestra from 1826 to 1840. Hermann Levi served as Hofkapellmeister from 1864. Max Zenger, briefly after Levi, and then Felix Otto Dessoff from 1875, subsequently led the ensemble. Felix Mottl succeeded Dessoff and was a particular champion of the music of Richard Wagner.

In the 20th century, the organisation received its current name in 1933, and the title of Hofkapellmeister evolved into Generalmusikdirektor (GMD). Joseph Keilberth was the first to hold the title of GMD with the organisation, in one of his earliest conducting posts with this orchestra, from 1935 to 1940. In the years after World War II, Otto Mazerath, Alexander Krannhals and Arthur Grüber guided the orchestra. Christof Perick was Generalmusikdirektor (GMD) from 1977–1985. His successors have included Günther Neuhold (1989–1995) and Kazushi Ono (1996–2002). From 2002 to 2008, Anthony Bramall was the orchestra's GMD. The British conductor Justin Brown became GMD of the orchestra in 2008.

== Hofkapellmeister ==
- Michael Balling (1904–1907)
- Georg Göhler (1907–1909)
- Leopold Reichwein (1909–1913)
- Fritz Cortolezis (1913–1925)
- Josef Krips (1926–1933)
- Klaus Nettstraetter (1933–1935)

== Generalmusikdirektoren (General Music Directors, GMD) ==
- Joseph Keilberth (1935–1940)
- Otto Matzerath (1940–1955)
- Alexander Krannhals (1955–1961)
- Arthur Grüber (1962–1976)
- Christof Perick (1977–1985)
- José Maria Collado (1985–1987)
- Günter Neuhold (1989–1995)
- Kazushi Ono (1996–2002)
- Anthony Bramall (2002–2008)
- Justin Brown (2008–2020)
- Georg Fritzsch (2020–present)
