= Johannes Brockt =

Austrian musicologist and conductor

Johannes Brockt (15 January 1901 — 25 August 1980) was an Austrian musicologist and conductor.

== Life ==
Brockt was born in Brieg (modern-day Brzeg), then part of the Province of Silesia in the Kingdom of Prussia. He wanted to be a painter, and was already enrolled in the State Academy of Fine and Applied Arts in Wrocław, but turned to music after high school. Brockt studied in Wrocław, Vienna and Leipzig, after which he studied musicology, art history and literature, as well as philosophy, in Berlin. In 1927 he earned his Ph.D. in Breslau (modern-day Wrocław). His dissertation topic was Ernst Wilhelm Wolf, lives and works. Brockt received a musical education with Camillo Horn and Leopold Reichwein in Vienna and Sigfrid Karg-Elert in Leipzig. He later held positions as a theater conductor in Stettin (modern-day Szczecin) and Breslau. He was a musical assistant at the Bayreuth Festival, and later was head of the Chamber Music Department at Radio Cologne.

Brockt worked as an accompanist, conductor and lecturer at several radio stations. After the Second World War, he worked as a freelancer in Vienna.

In addition to the hobby of painting (especially in oil and watercolor landscapes), he was also literary activity, and wrote all opera texts himself. He died on 25 August 1980, and was buried at the Baumgartner Cemetery in Vienna.

== Compositions ==
- Four miniatures for six brass (op. 10)
- Nine canons after Friedrich von Logau (op. 31)
- Sommerreise. Cycle of 24 songs by Johannes Müller-Schönhausen for tenor and piano (op. 50)
- Eight three-part a cappella chorus (op. 54)
- Paracelsus. Studies for large symphonic orchestra

== Editorship ==
- Descartes: Musicae compendium (first complete translation into German)
