= Kazushi Ōno =

Japanese conductor

Kazushi Ōno 大野和士
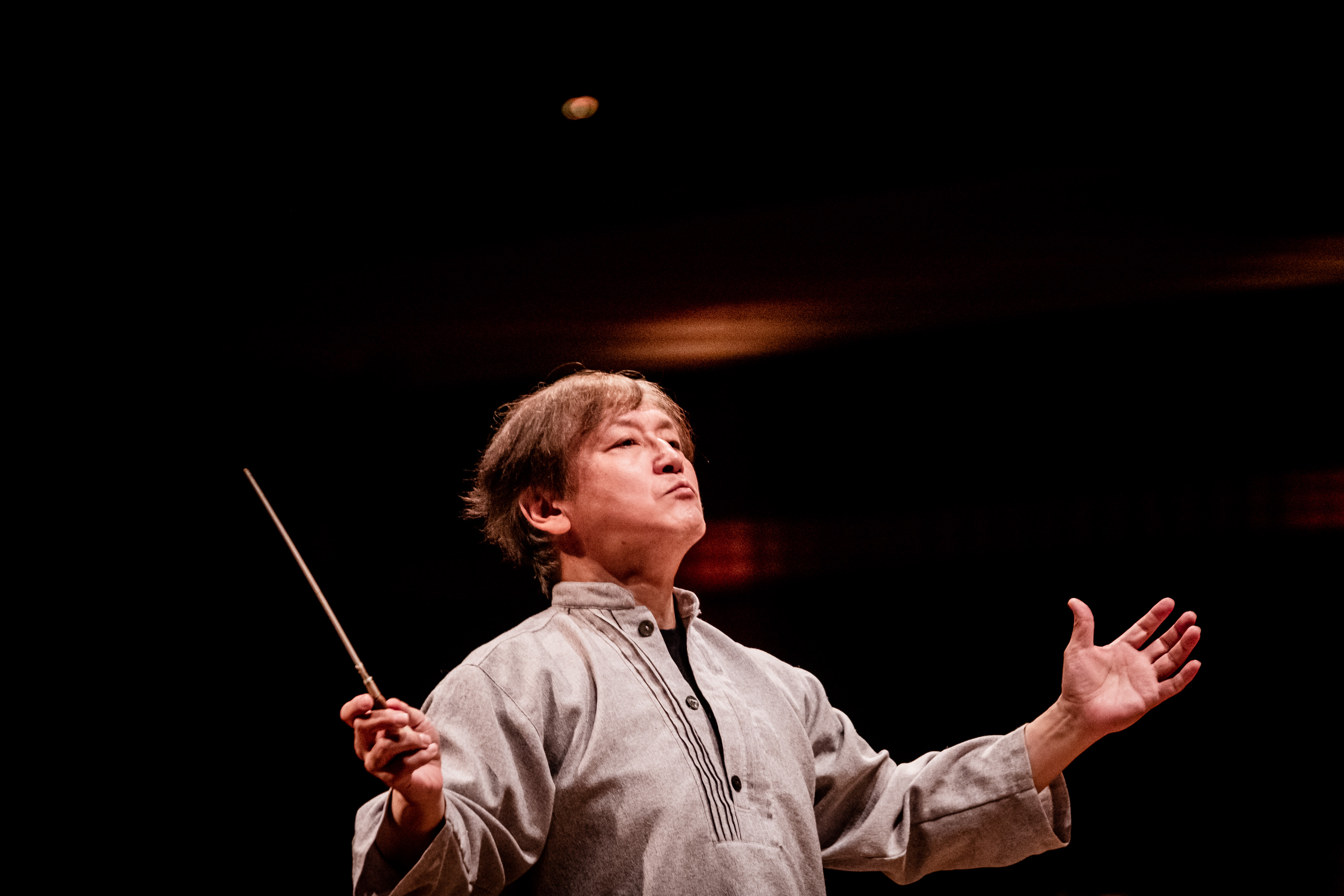
- Ōno in 2021

Background information
- Genre: classical music
- Occupation: conductor

Kazushi Ōno (大野 和士, Ōno Kazushi) (born 1960) is a Japanese conductor. He is currently music director of the Brussels Philharmonic and of the Tokyo Metropolitan Symphony Orchestra, and artistic director of New National Theatre Tokyo.

== Biography ==
Ōno studied at the Tokyo National University of Fine Arts and Music, and with Wolfgang Sawallisch and Giuseppe Patanè at the Bavarian State Opera, as a scholar of the Japanese Ministry of Culture. In 1987, he won First Prize in the 3rd Toscanini International Conductors' Competition.

Ōno was principal conductor of the Tokyo Philharmonic Orchestra from 1992 to 1999, and its artistic advisor from 1999 to 2001. He currently holds the title of conductor laureate with the orchestra.

In May 2013, the Tokyo Metropolitan Symphony Orchestra announced the appointment of Ōno as its music director, as of April 2015, with an initial contract of 5 years. In 2018, his contract was extended through March 2023. In October 2021, the orchestra further extended his contract through 2026. Ōno is scheduled to stand down as the orchestra's music director in April 2026, and subsequently to take the title of artistic advisor for two years, and after that to take the title of conductor laureate.

== Career in Europe ==
In Europe, Ōno was chief conductor of the Zagreb Philharmonic Orchestra from 1990 to 1996. He was general music director of the Baden State Opera, Karlsruhe from 1996 to 2002. In August 2002, he became music director of La Monnaie (Brussels), after his debut there in March 2001, conducting Salvatore Sciarrino's chamber opera Luci mie traditrici. Other contemporary operas that Ōno conducted with La Monnaie included Philippe Boesmans' Julie and Wintermärchen, and the world premiere of Toshio Hosokawa's Hanjo at the Aix-en-Provence Festival (2004). Ōno stepped down as music director at La Monnaie at the end of the 2007–2008 season, his recordings there having included Mahler's Resurrection Symphony and the five Prokofiev piano concertos with Abdel Rahman El Bacha. Ōno became principal conductor of the Opéra National de Lyon at the start of the 2008–2009 season, with an initial contract of 5 years. He concluded his tenure at Opéra National de Lyon at the close of the 2016–2017 season.

In January 2014, the Barcelona Symphony and Catalonia National Orchestra (OBC) announced the appointment of Ōno as its next music director, effective September 2015, with an initial contract of 3 years, which was extended until the end of the 2021–2022 season.

Ōno was appointed artistic director of the New National Theatre Tokyo (NNTT) from the 2018 season, since extended until the 2025–2026 season. His first productions included the world premiere of Asters in 2019, commissioned from Japanese composer Akira Nishimura, which was nominated for a 2020 International Opera Award. Subsequent NNTT world premieres include Dai Fujikura' A Dream of Armageddon (2020) and Keiichiro Shibuya's Android opera Super Angels (2021). In November 2024 he conducted the Japanese premiere of Guillaume Tell; one reviewer noting that the production, "unquestionably one of the NNTT's greatest achievements", was brought about by Ōno, in whose hands "the grandeur of Rossini's musical architecture was everywhere apparent".

Other new works Ōno has commissioned include Mark-Anthony Turnage's Hibiki, which premiered at Suntory Hall in November 2016 before featuring at the 2017 BBC Proms and which won the 2018 Royal Philharmonic Society award for Large-Scale Composition.

In 2021, Ōno first guest-conducted the Brussels Philharmonic. In September 2021, the Brussels Philharmonic announced the appointment of Ōno as its next music director, effective with the 2022–2023 season.

== Awards ==
Ōno is the recipient of the 2009 Suntory Music Award and the 2015 Asahi Prize. He was also awarded Officier de l’ordre des Arts et des Lettres by French cultural minister Françoise Nyssen for his contribution to Japanese society.

Cultural offices
Preceded by Tadaaki Otaka	Principal Conductor, Tokyo Philharmonic Orchestra; 1992–2000	Succeeded by Myung-whun Chung (artistic advisor)
Preceded by Günter Neuhold	General Music Director, Badische Staatskapelle; 1996–2002	Succeeded by Anthony Bramall
Preceded by Antonio Pappano	Music Director, La Monnaie, Bruxelles; 2002–2008	Succeeded by Ludovic Morlot
Preceded by Iván Fischer	Principal Conductor, Opéra national de Lyon; 2008–2017	Succeeded by Daniele Rustioni
Preceded by Eliahu Inbal (principal conductor)	Music Director, Tokyo Metropolitan Symphony Orchestra; 2015–present	Succeeded by incumbent
Preceded by Pablo González Bernardo	Music Director, Barcelona Symphony and Catalonia National Orchestra; 2015–2022	Succeeded by Ludovic Morlot
Preceded by Taijiro Iimori	Opera Artistic Director, New National Theatre Tokyo; 2018–present	Succeeded by incumbent
Preceded by Stéphane Denève	Music Director, Brussels Philharmonic; 2022–present	Succeeded by incumbent
