= Georg Kulenkampff =

German violinist (1898–1948)

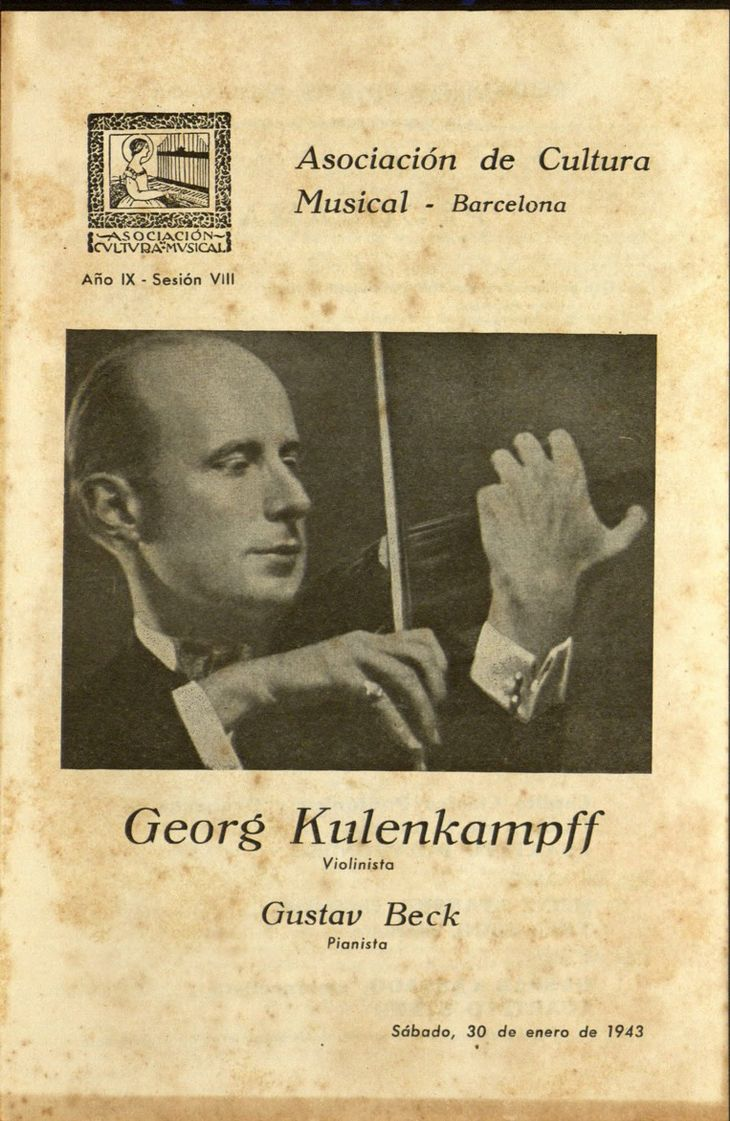
- Concert program, Barcelona 1943
- Born: Alwin Georg Kulenkampff-Post; 23 January 1898; Bremen, German Empire
- Died: 4 October 1948 (aged 50); Schaffhausen, Switzerland
- Occupation: Violinist

Alwin Georg Kulenkampff-Post (23 January 1898 – 4 October 1948) was a German virtuoso violinist. One of the most popular German concert violinists of the 1930s and 1940s, he was considered one of the finest violinists of the 20th century.

Kulenkampff was best known for his interpretations of works from the Romantic period. He gave the premiere performance of Robert Schumann's violin concerto 84 years after it was written and made the first recording of the piece. Additionally, his performances of the violin concertos of Bruch, Beethoven, Mendelssohn and Glazunov are considered among the finest on record, but his early death from encephalitis and the fact that his recording career coincided with the Nazi era have prevented his name from being better known to modern listeners.

== Biography ==
Georg Kulenkampff was the son of a well-to-do merchant family in Bremen. He took an interest in the violin from a very young age, and from 1904 (aged 6) began to receive instruction from the concertmaster of the Bremer Philharmoniker, and afterwards with its conductor Ernst Wendel. He then received lessons and encouragement from Leopold Auer (teacher of Mischa Elman, Efrem Zimbalist, Jascha Heifetz, Nathan Milstein and others) in Dresden, and made a concert debut in 1912 as solo violinist. On Auer's recommendation he was sent to study with Willy Heß at the Berlin Music Hochschule, and became in time director of the Hochschule Orchestra.

Kulenkampff's health was fragile from early life, and towards the end of the First World War he returned to his home town to become concertmaster of the Bremen Philharmonic. He made rapid progress, especially as a soloist, and in 1923 became professor-in-ordinary at the Berlin Music Hochschule. He taught there until 1926, when his solo career became all-absorbing, but resumed teaching there in 1931 until his departure from Germany in 1944. At the same time he gave concerts throughout Germany and, increasingly, in various parts of Europe, and had a busy broadcasting career. In 1927, he performed the Bach Double Violin Concerto in D minor with Alma Moodie (a student of Carl Flesch) and the Berlin Philharmonic (BPO).

Romance for Violin and Orchestra No. 2, Op. 50 (Beethoven)
Part 1

Part 2
with the Berlin Philharmonic, Paul Kletzki conducting (1932)

In 1935 he formed a celebrated trio with the pianist Edwin Fischer and the cellist Enrico Mainardi, with whom he remained active until 1948. Following his death, he was replaced as violinist by Wolfgang Schneiderhan. He also played in piano duos, especially with Georg Solti and Wilhelm Kempff: with Solti he recorded the Brahms sonatas, Mozart's 20th sonata and Beethoven's Kreutzer sonata for Decca, and there is also a Kreutzer with Kempff (DGG, 1935). His (Decca) recording of the Brahms Double Concerto with Mainardi, under the baton of Carl Schuricht, is notable as well.

In 1937 he gave the premiere of the rediscovered Violin Concerto in D minor of Robert Schumann, which had been studied and suppressed by Joseph Joachim, but which Kulenkampff now revived with the help of Georg Schünemann, the Nazi-appointed director of the Berlin State Library, where the autograph score was housed, and Paul Hindemith, whose compositions were already banned by the Nazi authorities. The addition of this work to the repertoire was important, and soon afterwards Kulenkampff made the world premiere recording. Before the war he recorded the Beethoven (BPO under Hans Schmidt-Isserstedt) and Mendelssohn concerti: he continued to perform the Mendelssohn work in Nazi Germany despite the antisemitic ban on his music, and for other concertos used the highly regarded cadenzas by the Jewish Fritz Kreisler.

Kulenkampff gave various other world premieres, notable of works by Ottorino Respighi (Violin Sonata No. 2) and by Jean Sibelius. He was very much in demand and very busy during the Nazi period, as an "Aryan" musician—although he did not subscribe to Nazi racist-nationalist theories and, by virtue of his importance and his "Aryan" status, was able to maintain proscribed parts of the repertoire.

In 1940 he moved to Potsdam, and in 1944, with increasingly unacceptable and intolerant demands from the prevailing powers, he left Germany for Switzerland. From 1943 there is a live recording from Berlin of a performance of the Sibelius concerto conducted by Wilhelm Furtwängler with the BPO. From Switzerland he continued to develop his international solo career, and he became successor to Carl Flesch as violin professor at the Lucerne Conservatory. He was first violin of the Kulenkampff Quartet from 1944, and among his students was the Italian-American Ruggiero Ricci from San Francisco (who studied with him in Berlin in the 1930s).

Kulenkampff died in Schaffhausen, Switzerland, of encephalitis (spinal paralysis) at age 50, suffering a rapid onset soon after his last concert. His memoirs appeared posthumously in 1952, entitled Geigerische Betrachtungen (A Violinist's Observations).

== See also ==
- See: List of music students by teacher: K to M#Georg Kulenkampff.
