= Ernst Wendel =

German violinist and conductor (1876–1938)

Ernst Wendel (26 March 1876 – 21 May 1938) was a German violinist and conductor.

== Life ==
Wendel was born in Breslau. For one season in 1896/97 Wendel was concertmaster of the Chicago Symphony Orchestra under Theodore Thomas. From 1909 to 1935, he was general music director of the Bremer Philharmoniker. As a violinist, he taught Georg Kulenkampff. In 1914, in Stuttgart and in 1925/26, he conducted the Frankfurter Museumsgesellschaft. In 1913, he conducted Anton Bruckner's Symphony No. 9 for the first time in Russia. He made his mark on Musik in Königsberg.

Wendel was married to the concert pianist Ilse Wendel née Wolde. His younger son was the set and costume designer Heinrich Wendel (1915–1980).

Wendel died in Jena aged 62.

== Work ==
- Das Grab im Busento, for male choir with orchestra
- Das deutsche lied, for men's choir with orchestra

He also composed a cappella men's choirs and Lieder.
