= Lawrence Renes =

Dutch-Maltese conductor (born 1970)

- Born: 1970 (age 55–56)
- Origin: Netherlands
- Education: Conservatorium van Amsterdam (violin); Royal Conservatory of The Hague (conducting)
- Occupation: Conductor
- Years active: 1995–present

Lawrence Renes (born 1970) is a Dutch-Maltese conductor.

He studied violin at the Conservatorium van Amsterdam and conducting at the Royal Conservatory of The Hague, from which he graduated cum laude in 1993. Renes was the first prize winner at the 1992 Nederlandse Omroep Stichting conducting course NIS. In 1992, he also won the Elisabeth Everts Prize. He made his professional conducting debut with the Orchestra of Gran Canaria. He has served as an assistant conductor to Edo de Waart with the Netherlands Radio Philharmonic. His international prominence increased after his emergency replacement of Riccardo Chailly to conduct a 1995 concert with the Royal Concertgebouw Orchestra. In 1996, Renes was named principal guest conductor of the Netherlands Radio Philharmonic. Renes became chief conductor of Het Gelders Orkest (Arnhem, the Netherlands) in 1998 and held the post through 2002.

Outside of the Netherlands, Renes became principal guest conductor of the Zagreb Philharmonic Orchestra in 1996. He served as Generalmusikdirektor of the Bremer Philharmoniker from 2001 to 2006. In November 2011, Renes was named the next chief conductor of the Royal Swedish Opera (Kungliga Operan), as of the 2012–2013 season, with an initial contract through the 2016–2017 season. Renes concluded his chief conductorship of the Royal Swedish Opera in 2017.

In contemporary music, Renes has championed the music of John Adams. He conducted both the first commercial recording of Adams' opera Doctor Atomic, with De Nederlandse Opera, and the UK premiere of the work at English National Opera. He has also conducted commercial recordings on such labels as Erato.

Cultural offices
Preceded by Roberto Benzi	Chief Conductor, Het Gelders Orkest; 1998–2002	Succeeded by Martin Sieghart
Preceded by Günter Neuhold	Chief Conductor, Bremer Philharmoniker; 2002–2006	Succeeded by Markus Poschner
Preceded by Alberto Hold-Garrido	Chief Conductor, Royal Swedish Opera; 2012–2017	Succeeded by Alan Gilbert
