= Bremer Philharmoniker =

Bremen orchestra

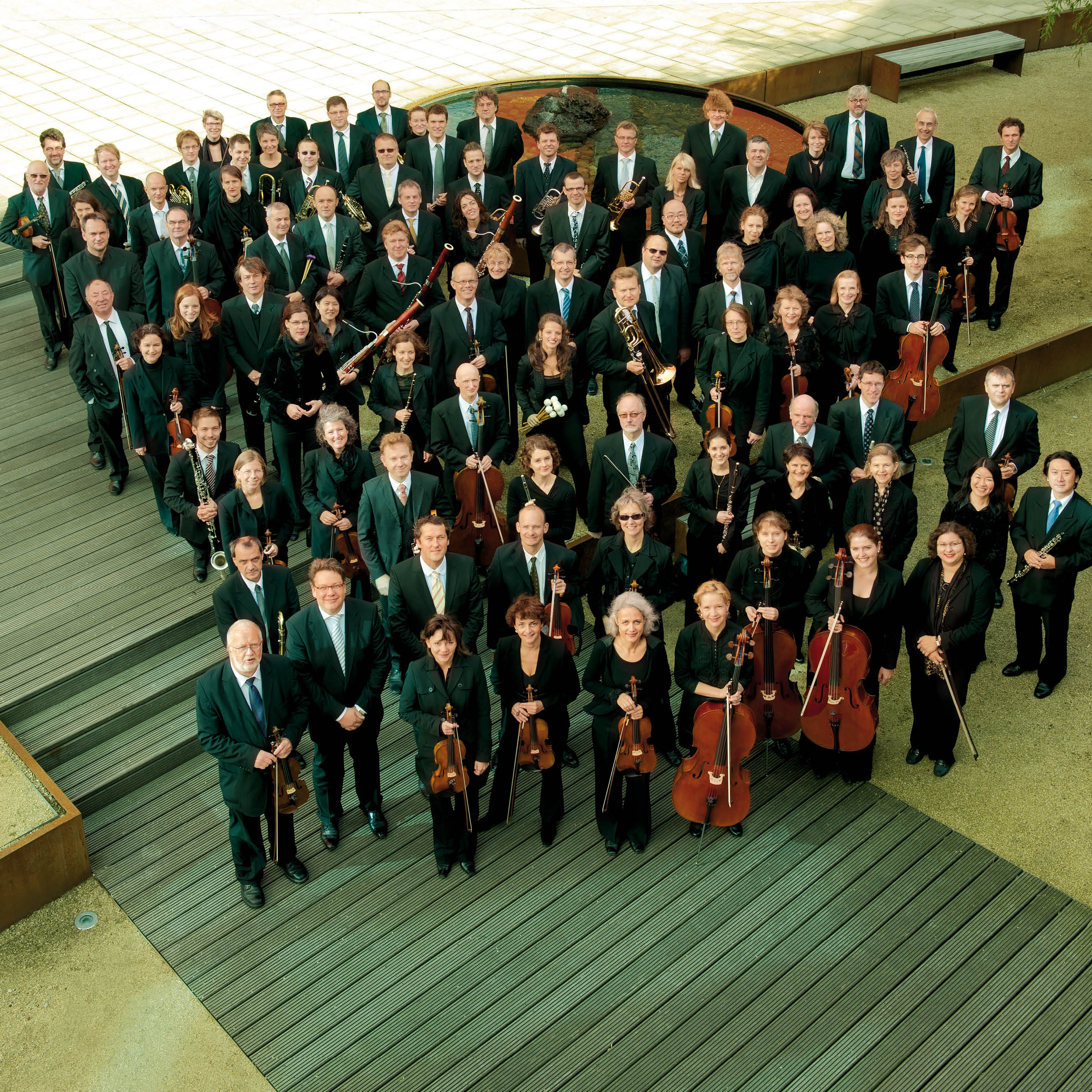
Die Bremer Philharmoniker 2011

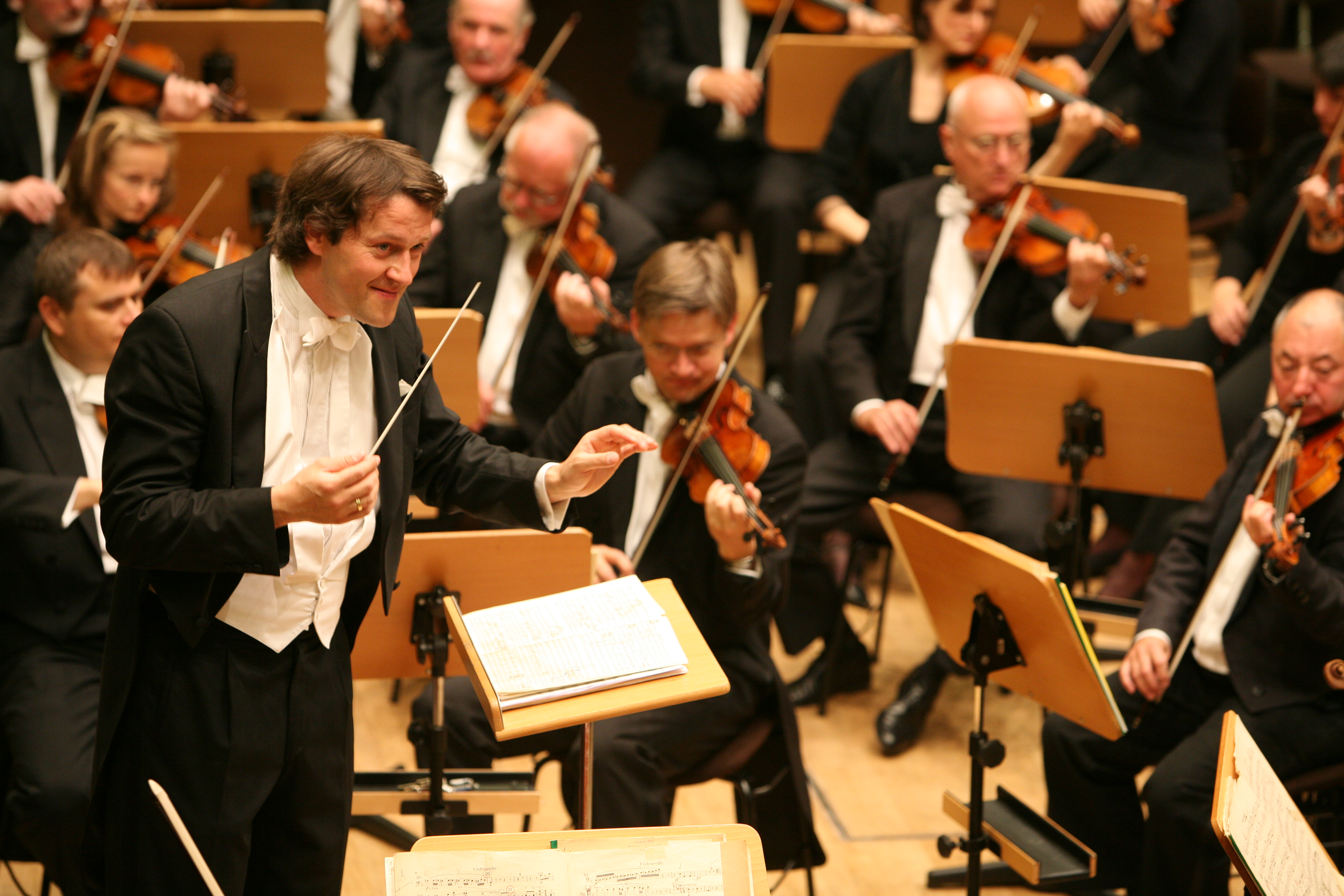
Die Bremer Philharmoniker

The Bremer Philharmoniker is the official orchestra of the Free Hanseatic City of Bremen. In addition to the music theatre in the Theater Bremen they organise 28 Philharmonic concerts per season, various special, benefit and chamber concerts as well as many projects in the field of music education. Christian Kötter-Lixfeld is the artistic director of the Bremen Philharmonic Orchestra, and Marko Letonja has been its Generalmusikdirektor since the 2018/2019 season.

== History ==
In 1820 the cathedral organist Wilhelm Friedrich Riem founded the Bremen Concert Orchestra. He was conductor of this orchestra until his death (1857). He was succeeded as conductor by Carl Martin Reinthaler. The orchestra was supervised by the Verein Bremischer Musikfreunde, founded in 1863.

In 1825 the Gesellschaft für Privatkonzerte – since 1895 Philharmonische Gesellschaft – was founded. It organised a Philharmonic Choir and a Concert Orchestra, as one of the first bourgeois orchestras. The city of Bremen granted subsidies to the orchestra, which was later called the "Philharmonic Orchestra".

Johannes Brahms made his debut as a pianist in 1855. It was his first public appearance with an orchestra. Thirteen years later, the German Requiem was premiered in Bremen under his direction. Even today, the Bremen Philharmonic Orchestra still feels a special affinity to Johannes Brahms: His compositions are among the most frequently performed in the repertoire.

The inflation that set in as a result of the First World War made it impossible at the beginning of the 1920s to maintain the Philharmonic Orchestra, which had been engaged on a private basis until then, in this form. It was therefore taken over by Bremen as the city orchestra. The Philharmonic Society borrowed the musicians for its concerts. In 1933, the orchestra was renamed Staatsorchester. After the Second World War, the orchestra was renamed the "Bremen Philharmonic State Orchestra".

In 2002, the orchestra changed its legal form to a limited liability company (Germany) and was renamed Bremer Philharmoniker GmbH. The shareholders are the orchestra musicians, organised in the Bremer Philharmoniker e.V. (26%), the city of Bremen (52%) and the Theater Bremen (22 %).

The company is managed by the general music director and the intendant. The number of musicians is around 82 (as of 2017). As before, a state subsidy of around 4 million euros (as of 2009) is granted. A supervisory committee chaired by the senator for culture balances the various interests.

== Conductors ==
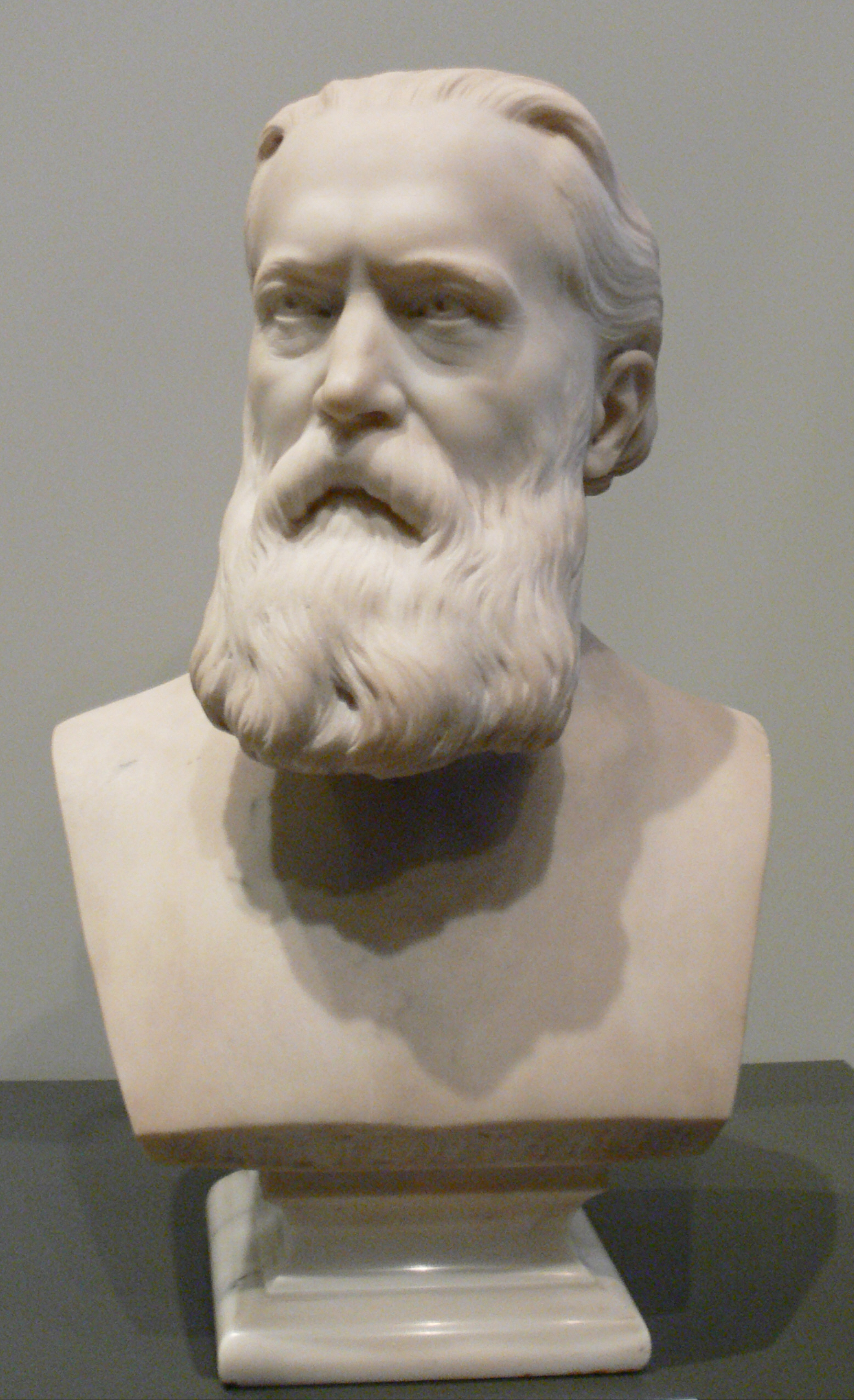
Carl Martin Reinthaler

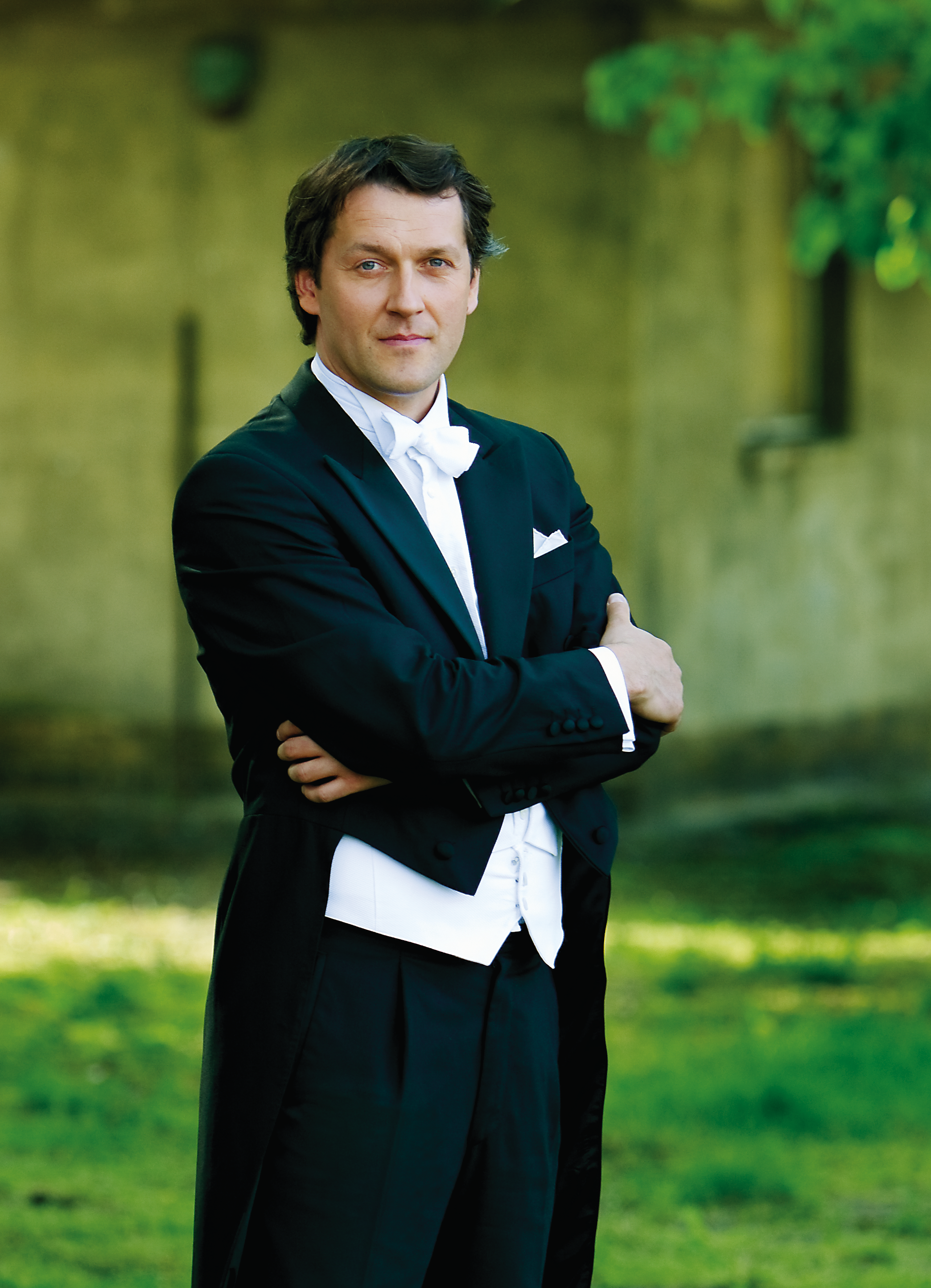
Markus Poschner (2010)

Chief conductors and general music directors

- Wilhelm Friedrich Riem 1820–1857
- Carl Martin Reinthaler 1857–1893
- Max Erdmannsdörfer 1893–1895
- Georg Schumann 1896–1899
- Karl Panzner 1899–1909
- Manfred Gurlitt 1924–1927
- Ernst Wendel 1909–1935
- Peter Beck 1934–1941
- Hellmut Schnackenburg 1937–1943 and 1945–1953
- Paul van Kempen 1953–1955
- Heinz Wallberg 1955–1961
- Hans Walter Kämpfel 1961–1965
- Hans Wallat 1965–1970
- Hermann Michael 1970–1978
- Peter Schneider 1978–1985
- Pinchas Steinberg 1985–1989
- Marcello Viotti 1989–1993
- Günter Neuhold 1995–2002
- Lawrence Renes 2002–2006
- Markus Poschner 2007–2017
- Marko Letonja from the 2018–2027 season

Other conductors

- Johannes Brahms, Paul Hindemith, Hans von Bülow, Karl Böhm, Hans Schmidt-Isserstedt, Rudolf Kempe, Karl Dammer

== Operas and concerts ==
Each season, the Bremen Philharmonic Orchestra performs approximately 175 opera performances at the Theater Bremen in Theater am Goetheplatz, 28 Philharmonic concerts at the Bremen Concert House Die Glocke and around 30 special, family and chamber concerts. The special concerts include, for example, benefit concerts for the Christmas charity fundraising campaign, the Bremen Cancer Aid Fund and the Bürgerpark Bremen as well as concerts within the framework of the Bremen Music Festival, the European Piano Contest Bremen and the International Conductors' Forum of the German Music Council. In their concert series "phil pur", the Bremen Philharmonic Orchestra devotes several evenings to the work of a single composer in a philharmonic concert. Since 2009, the Bremen Philharmonic Orchestra has also organised its own festival entitled "phil intensiv". After the first edition focused on Johannes Brahms' four symphonies for four days, Markus Poschner and the orchestra, together with the SWR Big Band, dedicated the second edition to the interplay of composition and improvisation and the encounter between classical music and jazz, symphony orchestra and big band. Richard Wagner's opera "Tristan and Isolde" stood as a concertante performance in 2011 on the festival programme. In addition, there are numerous projects for the promotion of children and young people as well as projects in the "Musikwerkstatt Bremen", founded in 2006. All in all, the Bremen Philharmonic Orchestra can be experienced at over 370 events during one season.

The core repertoire of the concerts ranges from the First Viennese School, Romanticism and Post-romanticism to Classical Modernism and Neue Musik. World-class soloists and conductors are continuously engaged, such as Frank Peter Zimmermann, Gidon Kremer, Midori, Julia Fischer, Julian Rachlin, Rudolf Buchbinder, Boris Beresowski, Sabine Meyer, Christopher Hogwood, Mario Venzago and Heinz Holliger.

== Music mediation ==
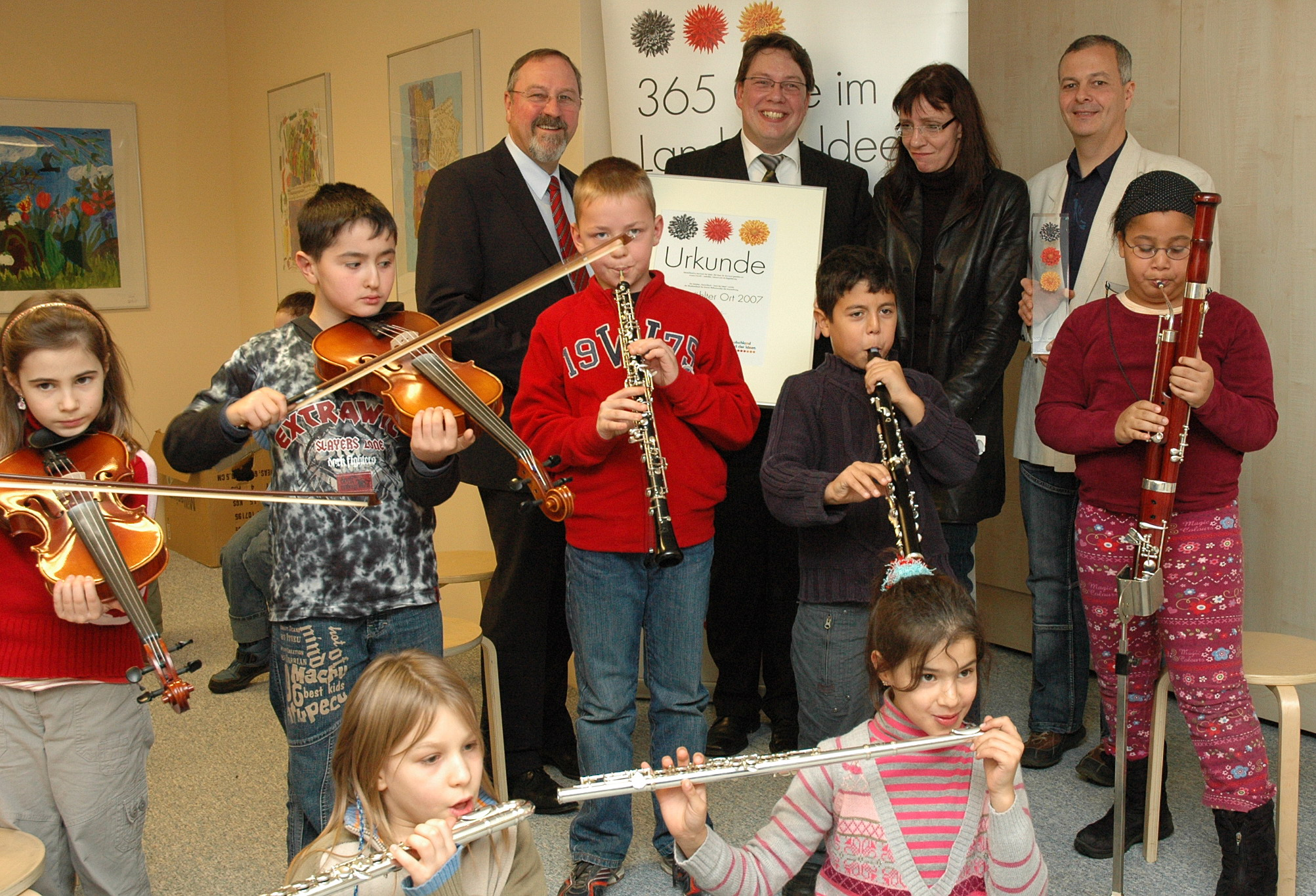
The Musikwerkstatt Bremen is awarded as a "Place in the Land of Ideas"

The Bremen Philharmonic Orchestra accompanies more than 10,000 children and young people every year with a wide variety of events in and outside school. A particularly ambitious project within music education is the "Musikwerkstatt Bremen", which opened in autumn 2006. The "Musikwerkstatt Bremen" was created in cooperation with the State Institute for Schools and pursues the goal of actively bringing children and adults into contact with music through personal experience. In the "Musikwerkstatt", one can gain insights into the world of a symphony orchestra, but above all try out all the instruments of an orchestra under pedagogical guidance.

Several activities were awarded prizes:

- In October 2005, the Carnival of the Animals project was awarded the Inventio 2005 by the Deutscher Musikrat and the Yamaha Children and Youth Foundation.
- In December 2006, the Musikwerkstatt Bremen was awarded and named a "Landmark in the Land of Ideas" by the initiative Deutschland – Land der Ideen and the Deutsche Bank.
- Prize winner of the competition "Children to Olympus – Schools cooperate with culture" 2007.
- Awarded the school project Fairies and Trolls, in cooperation with the Landesinstitut für Schule, the primary school and the Förderzentrum Grolland.
- Winner of the competition Ideen machen Schule with the project Ob im Weltraum jemand wohnt, in cooperation with the Landesinstitut für Schule and the Bürgermeister-Smidt-Schule.

== Philharmonic Society Bremen ==
In 1825, the association Society for Private Concerts was founded. He hoped to win capable musicians for Bremen and strove to form a good orchestra and choir. In the beginning the success was moderate, but then a steady concert orchestra with professional and amateur musicians was formed.

The Philharmonic Choir was also formed. After the death of the cathedral cantor and conductor of the Bremen Singakademie Wilhelm Friedrich Riem (1779–1857) there was a common conductor of both choirs since 1858: Carl Martin Reinthaler. After Riem left the choir, both choirs were united under the direction of Max Erdmannsdörfer in 1892 to form the joint Philharmonic Choir.

In 1895 the Gesellschaft für Privatkonzerte became the Philharmonische Gesellschaft. It was involved in Bremen's musical life on a voluntary basis and made a significant contribution to its development and diversity. Music lovers, sponsors and companies support the society. However, it was not in a position to maintain an orchestra of professional musicians in the long term and so it had to borrow musicians from the city orchestra or the state orchestra for its concerts.

Since 2001, Barbara Grobien has been chairwoman of the society.

In 2002, on the initiative of the company, the Bremer Philharmoniker GmbH was founded, in which the company holds a 26% share (see also above). It left the philharmonic concerts in the Glocke to the GmbH, but continues to organise chamber concerts.

The Philharmonic Society works together with the Musikfest Bremen to ensure high quality. Through a cooperation with Bremen University, a joint seminar is held to introduce the world of European art music.
