= Günter Neuhold =

Austrian conductor (born 1947)

Günter Neuhold (born 2 November 1947) is an Austrian conductor.

Born in Graz, he attended the Universität für Musik und darstellende Kunst Graz and graduated in 1968 with a master's degree. He later studied conducting with Franco Ferrara in Rome and with Hans Swarowsky in Vienna.

At the Theater Dortmund, Neuhold served as first conductor. His prizes at various music competitions have included:

- Florence, 1st prize, 1976
- San Remo ("Marinuzzi"), 1st prize, 1976
- Vienna ("Swarowsky"), 2nd prize, 1977
- Salzburg ("Böhm"), 1st prize, 1977
- Milan ("Cantelli") 3rd prize, 1977

From 1981 to 1986, Neuhold was music director of the Teatro Regio di Parma. He has also served as chief conductor of the Orchestra Sinfonica "Arturo Toscanini". From 1986 to 1990, Neuhold was chief conductor and music director of the Royal Flemish Philharmonic, now known as the Antwerp Symphony Orchestra. He was general music director of the Badische Staatskapelle from 1989 to 1995. From 1995 to 2002, he was chief conductor of the Bremer Philharmoniker and music director at the Bremen Opera. Since 2008 he has been chief conductor and artistic director of the Bilbao Orkestra Sinfonikoa (BOS; Bilbao Symphony Orchestra). In April 2010, the orchestra announced the extension of Neuhold's contract with the BOS for another 3 years. As of 2022, he is appointed Artistic Director and Chief conductor of the Cyprus Symphony Orchestra.

Neuhold has led commercial recordings for such labels as Naxos Records, Brilliant Classics and Bella Musica. These recorded works include: the second of only two recordings of the original 1904 version of Puccini's Madama Butterfly, Bruckner: Symphony No. 4, Bach's St Matthew Passion and a live recording of Richard Wagner's Der Ring des Nibelungen.

== Honours ==
1. 1999: Grand Decoration of Honour in Silver for Services to the Republic of Austria
2. 2007: Berufstitel Professor 2007: title of Professor

== Discography ==
1. J.S. Bach: St. Matthew Passion
2. B. Bartók: Bluebeard's Castle, Concerto for Orchestra
3. A. Berg: 3 Orchestral Pieces, Opus 6
4. H. Berlioz: La Damnation de Faust
5. J. Brahms: Brahms: Symphony 1
6. A. Bruckner: Symphony 4
7. C. Franck: Symphony in D minor
8. Z. Kodály: Hary Janos Suite, Dances of Galanta
9. F. Liszt-F. Schreker: Concerto for Jazz Band etc.
10. G. Mahler: Mahler: Symphony No. 1, 2, 3, 5
11. H. Marschner: Der Vampyr
12. G. Puccini: Madama Butterfly (1904)
13. W. Rihm: Portrait Concert
14. A. Schnittke: Piano Concerto
15. A. Schoenberg: Gurre-Lieder (reduced orchestra by Erwin Stein)
16. F. Schreker: Chamber Symphony
17. E. Schulhoff: Piano Concerto
18. Josef Strauss, Johann Strauss: "Strauss Dynasty"
19. I. Strawinsky: Le Sacre du Printemps
20. P.I. Tschaikowsky: Symphony No 5
21. G. Verdi: Messa da Requiem
22. R. Wagner: Der Ring des Nibelungen
23. Wolf-Ferrari: La Vita Nuova

Cultural offices
Preceded by Emil Tchakarov	Chief Conductor, deFilharmonie; 1986–1991	Succeeded by Muhai Tang
Preceded by José Maria Collado	Chief Conductor, Badische Staatskapelle; 1989–1995	Succeeded by Kazushi Ono
Preceded by Marcello Viotti	Chief Conductor, Bremer Philharmoniker; 1995–2002	Succeeded by Lawrence Renes
