= Barbara Grobien =

German patron and golfer (born 1938)

Barbara Grobien (born 24 July 1938) is a German patron, golf player, chairwoman of the Bremer Philharmoniker, and honorary citizen of Bremen.

== Life ==
Born in Bremen, Grobien is the second child of Albrecht and Margret Wandel. The father was a partner in an insurance agency. She spent her school years in Bremen, which she completed in 1958 with the Abitur at the Schule am Barkhof in Bremen. She began studying philology in English, history and French. Since 1959 she has been married to the merchant Michael Grobien (later company Lampe & Schwartze, 2003 chairman of the German Maritime Search and Rescue Service). Both moved to Montevideo and returned to Bremen in 1965.

As a sportswoman, Grobien was honoured by the Senate in 1977 as a member of the Bremen team that won the German Women's Cup Championship in golf. From 1988, she was a member of the German senior women's team at the European "Marisa Sgaravatti Trophy" for ten years. In 1991, she became German senior vice champion in golf.

Grobien was involved in promoting art and culture in Bremen. In 1985, she founded the association Freunde junger Musiker e.V. Bremen. Meanwhile, there are eight circles in Germany which have made it their business to support young, highly talented musicians, to give them the opportunity to present programmes, to gain experience on the podium and, if possible, to find an agency. Since 1987, she was first a member of the advisory board of the Bremer Philharmoniker, then she was elected to the board of directors and in 2001 she was elected chairman of the Philharmonic Society. She played a decisive role in the privatisation of the Bremer Philharmoniker in 2002 and its transformation into the Bremer Philharmoniker GmbH.

Since 2002, the "Michael and Barbara Grobien Stiftung" has been supporting the Sea Rescue Service and the Philharmonic Society.

In 2004, she was one of the personalities who signed the "Bremen Declaration" on the European Capital of Culture and thus assured its support. Since 2004, she has been a member of the board of trustees of the association Freunde des Sendesaales e. V., which is committed to the preservation and continued operation of the Bremen Sendesaal.

== Honours ==
On 6 September 2005, the Senate of Bremen decided, together with the former mayor of Bremen Annemarie Mevissen, to grant her honorary citizenship of Bremen - the highest distinction of the Hanseatic city. The Senate thus honoured "the significant and lasting achievements of these two Hanseatic women around Bremen and their exemplary commitment". The award was presented by Mayor Henning Scherf at a ceremony on 5 October 2005 in the Bremen City Hall.

In October 2010, she was elected by the Bremen University to the board of trustees of the University of Bremen Foundation.

== Publications ==
- Chiquitania. In Henner Geldmacher (publisher.): No problema. Geschichten aus dem Managerleben. (IfAD – Institut für Außenwirtschaft). OWC-Verlag für Außenwirtschaft, Münster 2009, ISBN 978-3-939717-09-6, pp. 32–38.
- Herbert Wolfgang Keiser, Rainer W. Schulze: Franz Radziwill, der Maler. Publisher: State Museum for Art and Cultural History, Thiemig-Verlag, Munich 1975, ISBN 3-521-04057-7. (Exhibition catalogue; catalogue editing: Barbara Grobien)
