= Stéphane Denève =

French conductor

Stéphane Denève (born 24 November 1971) is a French conductor. He is currently music director of the St. Louis Symphony Orchestra and artistic director of the New World Symphony.

== Biography ==
Denève was born in Tourcoing, France, and graduated from the Paris Conservatoire. Denève worked as conducting assistant to Sir Georg Solti with the Orchestre de Paris, Georges Prêtre at the Opéra National de Paris, and Seiji Ozawa at the Saito Kinen Festival Matsumoto in 1998.

Denève assumed the post of music director of the Royal Scottish National Orchestra (RSNO) in September 2005, his first music directorship. He led the RSNO at the 2006 Proms concerts in London and its first-ever performance in France. In April 2007, his contract with the orchestra was extended through 2011. In March 2010, the RSNO announced the further extension of Denève's contract for one more year and the conclusion of his tenure after the 2011–2012 season. Denève and the RSNO have made several commercial recordings for the Naxos and Chandos labels, including works of Albert Roussel and Guillaume Connesson.

In October 2009, Denève first guest-conducted the Stuttgart Radio Symphony Orchestra (RSO Stuttgart) as a substitute for Michel Plasson. Based on that appearance, in March 2010, the RSO Stuttgart announced the appointment of Denève as its sixth chief conductor, starting with the 2011–2012 season. His initial Stuttgart contract was for three years through the 2013–2014 season. In June 2013, the RSO Stuttgart announced the extension of his contract through the 2015–2016 season. Denève concluded his tenure as chief conductor of the RSO Stuttgart with the end of the 2015–2016 season, and was its final chief conductor before the orchestra's merger with the Southwest German Radio Symphony Orchestra.

In November 2013, Denève first guest-conducted the Brussels Philharmonic. In June 2014, the Brussels Philharmonic announced the appointment of Denève as its next music director, effective with the 2015–2016 season. One new initiative during Denève's tenure is the establishment of CffOR (Centre for Future Orchestral Repertoire) for commissioning new compositions. With the Brussels Philharmonic, Denève has commercially recorded other works of Guillaume Connesson and Sergei Prokofiev. In 2017, Denève conducted the Brussels Philharmonic in the first cello edition of the Queen Elisabeth Competition in Brussels. Denève concluded his music directorship of the Brussels Philharmonic at the close of the 2021–2022 season. In January 2022, the Radio Filharmonisch Orkest (RFO) announced the appointment of Denève as its next principal guest conductor, effective with the 2023–2024 season. Denève had first guest-conducted the RFO in 2014.

Denève made his US conducting debut at Santa Fe Opera in 1999 with Poulenc's Dialogues des Carmelites. In 2003, he first guest-conducted the St. Louis Symphony Orchestra (SLSO). His first appearance as guest conductor with the Philadelphia Orchestra was in 2007. In April 2014, the Philadelphia Orchestra named Denève its next principal guest conductor, effective with the 2014–2015 season. In February 2017, the orchestra announced the extension of Denève's contract as principal guest conductor through the 2019–2020 season.

In June 2017, the SLSO named Denève as its next music director, effective with the 2019–2020 season, with an initial contract of three seasons. He held the title of SLSO music director-designate in the 2018–2019 season. In March 2021, the SLSO announced the extension of Denève's contract as its music director through the 2025–2026 season.

In September 2022, the New World Symphony (NWS) announced the appointment of Denève as its artistic director, with immediate effect. In June 2026, the NWS announced the extension of Denève's contract as artistic director through the 2031-2032 season.

== Personal life ==
In July 2007, Denève married Åsa Masters in a ceremony in California. The couple have a daughter, Alma, born in 2008. Denève received an honorary DLitt from Heriot-Watt University in 2008. In 2020, Denève and Masters contracted COVID-19, and subsequently recovered. The family resides in Saint Louis, Missouri, USA.

Cultural offices
Preceded by Michel Tabachnik	Chief Conductor, Brussels Philharmonic; 2015–2022	Succeeded by Kazushi Ōno
Preceded by Michael Tilson Thomas	Artistic Director, New World Symphony; 2022–present	Succeeded by incumbent
