= Daniel Sternefeld =

Belgian composer and conductor

Daniel Sternefeld (Antwerp, 27 November 1905 – Brussels, 2 June 1986) was a Belgian composer and conductor.

== Life and career ==
Sternefeld took private lessons with Renaat Veremans and Paul Gilson at the Royal Conservatory of Flanders in Antwerp, after which he studied conducting under Frank van der Stucken at the Mozarteum in Salzburg. He completed his studies with Bernard Paumgartner, Clemens Krauss and Herbert von Karajan. In 1929, he joined the orchestra of the Royal Flemish Opera, and in 1944, he was appointed as its principal conductor. Between 1930 and 1940 Sternefeld was also working for the Koninklijke Nederlandse Schouwburg of Antwerp, for whom he wrote incidental music. He also conducted the Cercle musical juif and several choral societies in Antwerp. During the occupation Sternefeld, an ethnic Jew, was forced into hiding in Antwerp. In 1942, he risked his life by attending the funeral of his teacher Paul Gilson in Brussels. He was arrested in late 1943 and incarcerated in the Dossin Barracks in Mechelen. He stayed several months in this Sammellager but was released. It was during this period that he wrote his first symphony. In 1948, he left the Royal Flemish Opera for the Belgian Radio Symphony Orchestra in Brussels – serving initially as associate conductor, and then from 1957 to 1970 as principal conductor – where he became known for his interpretations of modern music. He travelled the world as a guest director and also gave conducting classes at the Royal Conservatoire of Antwerp from 1948 until his retirement in 1971. While his work as a conductor left him little time to compose, the last 17 years of his life were devoted to writing music.

== Style ==
In his writings, a clear evolution can be traced from a late romantic musical language, by way of the chromaticism of Wagner and the sonority of Mahler and Richard Strauss, to lyrical expressionism. One of his most admired composers was Igor Stravinsky.

== List of works (alphabetical) ==
Based on the list of scores available at the Belgian Documentation Centre for Contemporary Music]:

- 'K kwam lestmael door een groene wei – 1977, for voice and harp
- A.B.V.V. Lied – for middle voice and piano
- A.B.V.V. Mars – 1949, for mixed choir
- Blaaskwintet – 1986, for flute, oboe, clarinet, horn and bassoon
- Bruegel – 1981, for orchestra
- Elegie – 1931, for orchestra
- Etude-passacaglia – 1979, for chromatic or diatonic harp
- Festivitas populacia bruocsella – 1979, for orchestra
- Frère Jacques – 1954, for 4 horns, 3 trumpets, 3 trombones, 1 tuba and percussion
- Ghequetst ben ik van binnen – 1977, for voice and harp
- Halewijn – 1978, for orchestra
- Het hemelbed – 1979, for orchestra
- Ik zag Cecilia komen – 1977, for voice and harp
- Kleine burlesque nr.1 – 1930, for flute, oboe, clarinet and bassoon
- Kleine burlesque nr.2 – for flute, oboe, clarinet and bassoon
- Mater Dolorosa – 1934, for opera
- Mater Dolorosa – 1934, for Soprano solo, choir and orchestra
- Pierlala – 1938, for song and orchestra
- Rossiniazata – 1981, for orchestra
- Rossiniazata – 1981, for piano
- Salve Antwerpia – 1979, for orchestra
- Symphonie No. 1 – 1943, for orchestra
- symphonie No. 2 'Bruegel' - 1981-1983, for orchestra
- Varieties op Broeder Jacob – 1954, for band
- Vijf Nederlandse liederen uit de XVIe en XVIIe eeuw – 1985, for band
- Vijf Nederlandse liederen – 1983, for fanfare
- Vlaamse volksliederen – 1934, for chamber orchestra
- Waaier – 1984, for orchestra
- Zang en dans aan het hof van Maria Van Bourgondië – 1976, for chamber or symphonic orchestra

== Discography ==
- Mater Dolorosa; Marie Therese Letorney (the Mother), Lucienne Van Deyck (Night), Tom Sol (Death), Catherine Vandevelde (1st Nymph), Barbara Haveman (2nd Nymph); Vlaams Radio Koor and Zeffiretti vocal ensemble; Koninklijk Filharmonisch Orkest van Vlaanderen; Grant Llewellyn, conductor (Naxos 8.554500-01 and Marco Polo 8.225068-69)
- Pierlala and Symphony #1; Renaat Verbruggen, baritone; BRT Philharmonic Orchestra; Daniël Sternefeld, conductor — Four interludes and finale of the opera Mater Dolorosa and Symphony #2; BRTN Philharmonic Orchestra; Meir Minsky, conductor (Phaedra 92007)
- Four interludes and finale of the opera Mater Dolorosa, Symphony #1, Elegy and Variations on Frère Jacques; Brussels Philharmonic; Arturo Tamayo (Flemish Connection IX = Et'cetera KTC 4029)
- Symphony #1, Four interludes and finale of the opera Mater Dolorosa and Rossiniazata; Moscow Symphony Orchestra; Frédéric Devreese, conductor (Naxos 8.554123)
