= Deutsche Oper Berlin =

German opera company

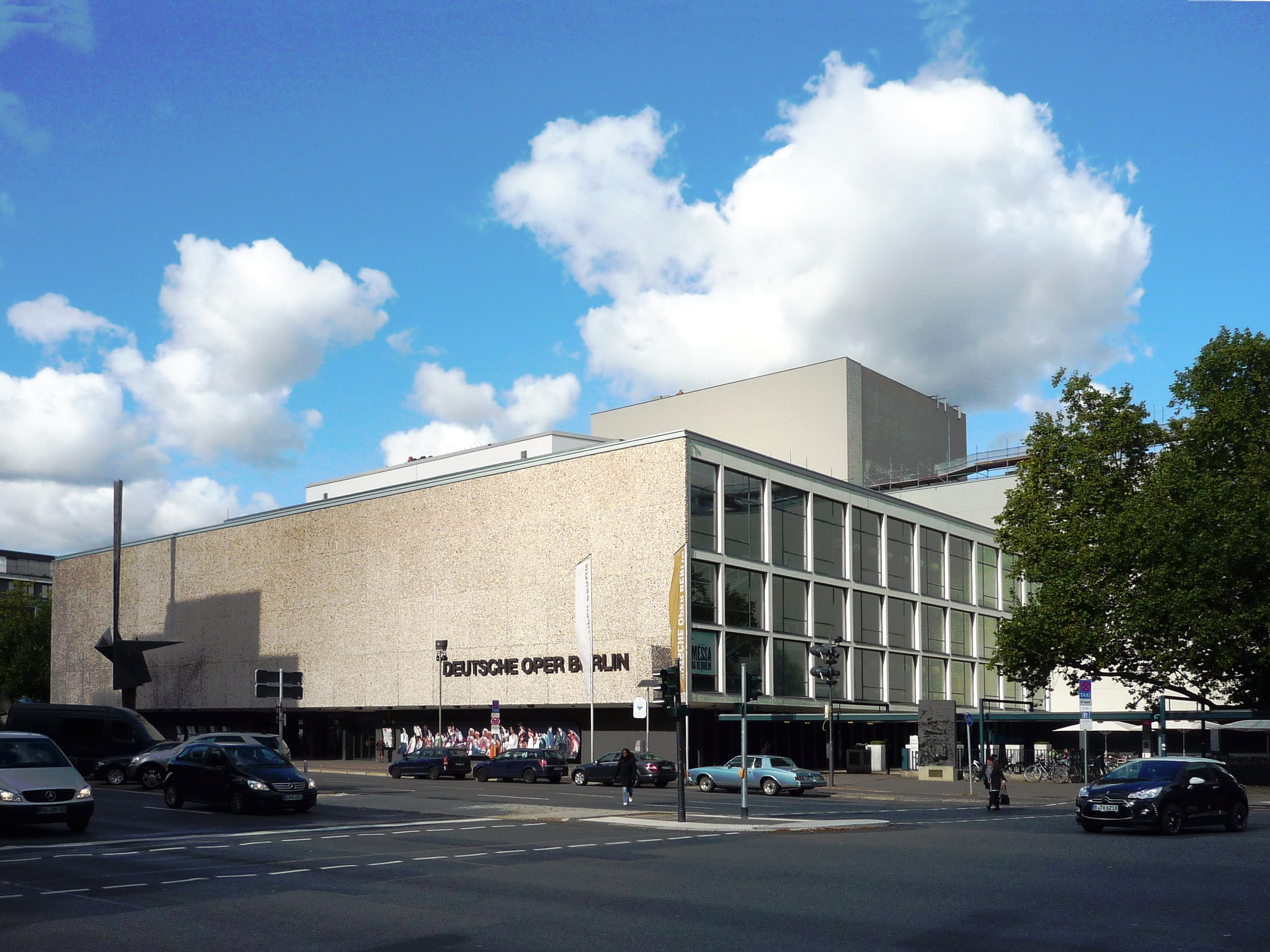
- Present opera house
- Interactive map of the Deutsche Oper Berlin area
- Former names: Deutsches Opernhaus; Städtische Oper; Städtisches Opernhaus

General information
- Location: Berlin, Germany
- Coordinates: 52°30′46″N 13°18′30″E
- Opened: 1912; 1961

Design and construction
- Architects: Heinrich Seeling (1912); Fritz Bornemann (1961)

Website
- deutscheoperberlin.de/de_DE/home

The Deutsche Oper Berlin is a German opera company located in the Charlottenburg district of Berlin. The resident building is the country's second largest opera house (after Munich's) and also home to the Berlin State Ballet.

Since 2004, the Deutsche Oper Berlin, like the Staatsoper Unter den Linden (Berlin State Opera), the Komische Oper Berlin, the Berlin State Ballet, and the Bühnenservice Berlin (Stage and Costume Design), has been a member of the Berlin Opera Foundation.

== History ==
The company's history goes back to the Deutsches Opernhaus built by the then independent city of Charlottenburg—the "richest town of Prussia"—according to plans designed by Heinrich Seeling from 1911. It opened on 7 November 1912 with a performance of Beethoven's Fidelio, conducted by Ignatz Waghalter. In 1925, after the incorporation of Charlottenburg by the 1920 Greater Berlin Act, the name of the resident building was changed to Städtische Oper (Municipal Opera).

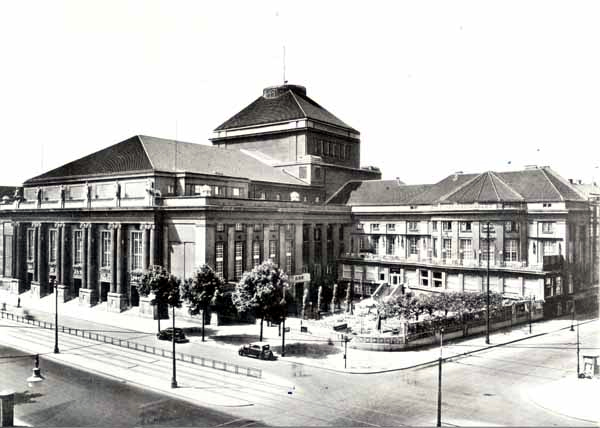
Deutsches Opernhaus, 1912

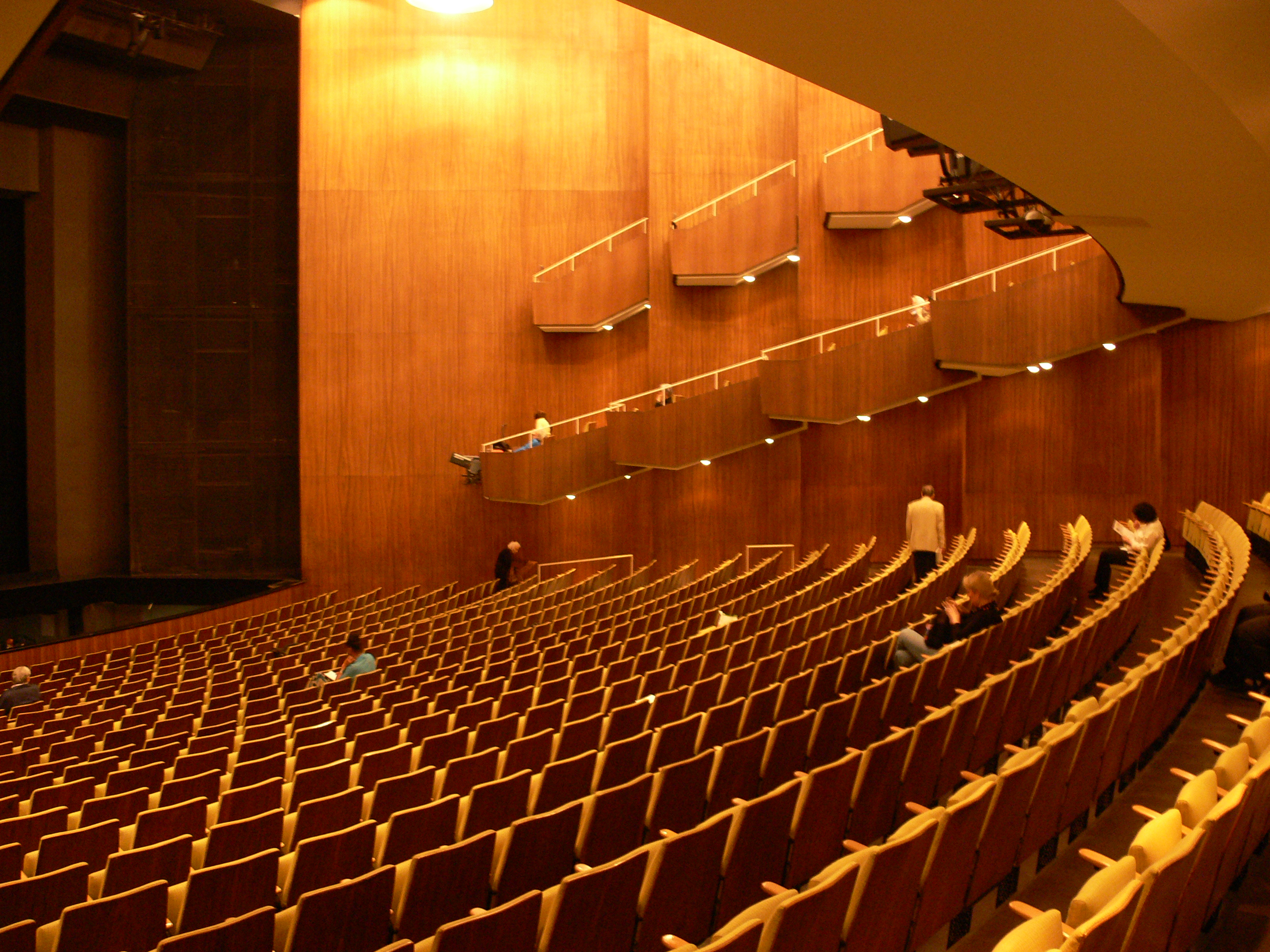
Interior

With the Nazi seizure of power in 1933, the opera was under control of the Reich Ministry of Public Enlightenment and Propaganda. Minister Joseph Goebbels had the name changed back to Deutsches Opernhaus, competing with the Berlin State Opera in Mitte controlled by his rival, the Prussian minister-president Hermann Göring. In 1935, the building was remodeled by Paul Baumgarten and the seating reduced from 2,300 to 2,098 places. Carl Ebert, the pre-World War II general manager, chose to emigrate from Germany rather than endorse the Nazi view of music, and went on to co-found the Glyndebourne Festival Opera in England. He was replaced by Max von Schillings, who acceded to demands that he enact works of "unalloyed German character". Several artists, like the conductor Fritz Stiedry and the singer Alexander Kipnis, followed Ebert into emigration. The opera house was destroyed by a Royal Air Force air raid on 23 November 1943. Performances continued at the Admiralspalast in Mitte until 1945. Ebert returned to serve as general manager after the war.

After the war, in what had now been called West Berlin, the company, again called Städtische Oper, used the nearby Theater des Westens; its opening production was Fidelio, on 4 September 1945. Its home was finally rebuilt in 1961 but to a much-changed, sober design by Fritz Bornemann. The opening production of the newly renamed Deutsche Oper, on 24 September, was Mozart's Don Giovanni.

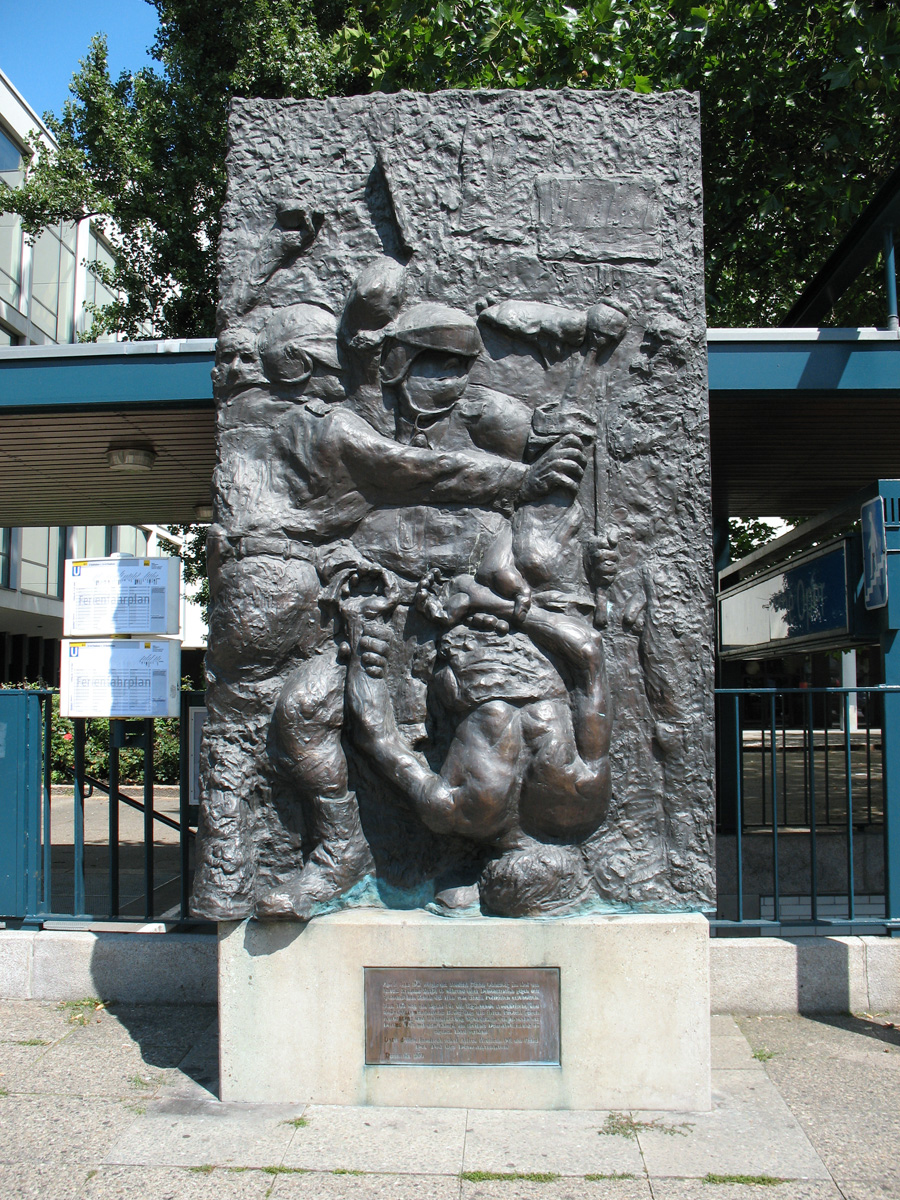
Ohnesorg memorial by Alfred Hrdlicka

On the evening of 2 June 1967, Benno Ohnesorg, a student taking part in the German student movement, was shot in the streets around the opera house. He had been protesting against the visit to Germany by the Shah of Iran, who was attending a performance of Mozart's The Magic Flute.

Past Generalmusikdirektoren (GMD, general music directors) have included Bruno Walter, Kurt Adler, Ferenc Fricsay, Lorin Maazel, Gerd Albrecht, Jesús López-Cobos, Giuseppe Sinopoli, and Christian Thielemann. In April 2001, Sinopoli died at the podium while conducting Aida, at age 54. In October 2005, Renato Palumbo was appointed GMD as of the 2006–2007 season. In October 2007, the Deutsche Oper announced the appointment of Donald Runnicles as their next Generalmusikdirektor, effective August 2009, for an initial contract of five years. Simultaneously, Palumbo and the Deutsche Oper mutually agreed to terminate his contract, effective November 2007. In November 2020, the company announced the most recent extension of Runnicles' contract as its GMD, through 2027. In September 2023, the Deutsche Oper Berlin announced that Runnicles is to stand down as its GMD at the close of the 2025-2026 season, one season earlier than his most recent contract extension, at Runnicles' own request.

The most recent Intendant (artistic director) of the company was Dietmar Schwarz, through 31 July 2025. The current executive director of the company is Thomas Fehrle, who is currently contracted with the company through 2027. In February 2023, the company announced the appointment of Aviel Cahn as its next Intendant, effective 1 August 2026. In September 2025, the company announced the appointments of Maxime Pascal and Michele Spotti as co-principal guest conductors, and Titus Engel as 'conductor-in-residence', all effective in the summer of 2026.

== Idomeneo controversy ==
In September 2006, the Deutsche Oper's then-Intendantin (general manager) Kirsten Harms drew criticism after she cancelled the production of Mozart's opera Idomeneo by Hans Neuenfels, because of fears that a scene in that production featuring the severed heads of Jesus, Buddha and Muhammad would offend Muslims, and that the opera house's security might come under threat if violent protests took place. (This is a departure from the original libretto, in which there is no such scene.) Critics of the decision include German Ministers and the German Chancellor Angela Merkel. The reaction from Muslims was mixed. The leader of Germany's Islamic Council welcomed the decision, whilst a leader of Germany's Turkish community, criticising the decision, said:

"This is about art, not about politics ... We should not make art dependent on religion – then we are back in the Middle Ages."

At the end of October 2006, the opera house announced that performances of Mozart's opera Idomeneo would then proceed.

== Premieres ==
=== Städtische Oper Berlin ===
- 1923: Emil von Reznicek, Carl Meinhard, Rudolf Bernauer: Holofernes
- 1932: Franz Schreker: Der Schmied von Gent
- 1932: Kurt Weill, Caspar Neher: Die Bürgschaft

=== Städtisches Opernhaus Berlin ===
- 1952: Boris Blacher: Preußisches Märchen

=== Deutsche Oper Berlin ===
- 1961: Giselher Klebe: Alkmene
- 1964: Roger Sessions, Giuseppe Antonio Borgese: Montezuma
- 1965: Hans Werner Henze: Der junge Lord, (libretto: Ingeborg Bachmann)
- 1966: Roman Haubenstock-Ramati: Amerika
- 1968: Luigi Dallapiccola: Ulisse
- 1969: Boris Blacher: 200 000 Taler
- 1970: Günter Grass, Marcel Luipart: Die Vogelscheuchen (ballet)
- 1972: Wolfgang Fortner, Matthias Braun: Elisabeth Tudor
- 1979: Wilhelm Dieter Siebert, Untergang der Titanic
- 1981: Mauricio Kagel: Aus Deutschland
- 1987: Wolfgang Rihm: Oedipus
- 1987: Erhard Grosskopf: Lichtknall
- 1988: Marc Neikrug: Los Alamos
- 1990: Hans Werner Henze: Das verratene Meer, (libretto: Hans-Ulrich Treichel)
- 1992: Aribert Reimann: Das Schloß, (based on Franz Kafka's novel of the same name)
- 2005: Isabel Mundry: Ein Atemzug – Odyssee
- 2008: Walter Braunfels: Szenen aus dem Leben der Heiligen Johanna (scenic premiere)
- 2017: Andrea Lorenzo Scartazzini: Edward II
- 2017: Aribert Reimann: L'invisible, (Trilogie lyrique after Maurice Maeterlinck)

== Intendanten (General Managers) ==
- Georg Hartmann (1912–1923)
- Wilhelm Holthoff von Faßmann (1923–1925)
- Heinz Tietjen (1925–1931)
- Carl Ebert (1931–1933)
- Max von Schillings (1933)
- Wilhelm Rode (1934–1943)
- Hans Schmidt-Isserstedt (1943–1944)
- Michael Bohnen (1945–1947)
- Heinz Tietjen (1948–1954)
- Carl Ebert (1954–1961)
- Rudolf Sellner (1961–1972)
- Egon Seefehlner (1972–1976)
- Siegfried Palm (1976–1981)
- Götz Friedrich (1981–2000)
- André Schmitz (interim, 2000–2001)
- Udo Zimmermann (2001–2003)
- Heinz Dieter Sense / Peter Sauerbaum (interim, 2003–2004)
- Kirsten Harms (2004–2011)
- Christoph Seuferle (interim, 2011–2012)
- Dietmar Schwarz (2012–2025)
- Aviel Cahn (designate, effective August 2026)

== Generalmusikdirektoren (Music Directors) ==
- Ignatz Waghalter (1912–1923)
- Bruno Walter (1925–1929)
- Kurt Adler, resident conductor (1932–1933)
- Artur Rother (1935–1943, 1953–1958)
- Karl Dammer (1937–1943)
- Ferenc Fricsay (1949–1952)
- Richard Kraus (1954–1961)
- Heinrich Hollreiser, chief conductor (1961–1964)
- Lorin Maazel (1965–1971)
- Gerd Albrecht, resident conductor (1972–1974)
- Jesús López Cobos (1981–1990)
- Giuseppe Sinopoli (1990)
- Rafael Frühbeck de Burgos (1992–1997)
- Christian Thielemann (1997–2004)
- Renato Palumbo (2006–2008)
- Sir Donald Runnicles (2009–present)
