= Brussels Philharmonic =

Belgian symphony orchestra

- Orchestra
- Brussels Philharmonic & Kazushi Ono
- Former name: BRT Philharmonic Orchestra; Flemish Radio Orchestra
- Founded: 1935
- Location: Brussels, Belgium
- Concert hall: Studio 4, Flagey
- Concertmaster: Otto Derolez
- Music director: Kazushi Ōno
- Website: www.brusselsphilharmonic.be/en/
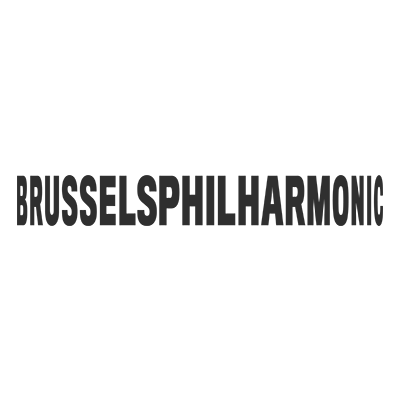

The Brussels Philharmonic is a Belgian symphony orchestra based in Brussels. It was founded in 1935 by the National Institute for Radio Broadcasting (NIR) as the Groot Symfonie-Orkest (Grand Symphony Orchestra). Following several name changes and its separation from public broadcasting in 1998, the orchestra adopted its present name in 2008.

The orchestra is based in Studio 4 of the Flagey building in Brussels. Its repertoire includes 19th- and 20th-century symphonic works, contemporary music and film music. Since September 2022, Kazushi Ōno has served as music director, with Ilan Volkov as principal guest conductor.

== History ==
The Brussels Philharmonic was founded in 1935 as the Groot Symfonie-Orkest (Grand Symphony Orchestra) of the National Institute for Radio Broadcasting (NIR), Belgium's public broadcaster at the time. Under principal conductor Franz André and artistic director Paul Collaer, the orchestra placed particular emphasis on contemporary music, alongside the traditional symphonic repertoire and works by Belgian composers. The orchestra collaborated with conductors and composers including Igor Stravinsky, Sergei Prokofiev, Béla Bartók and Leonard Bernstein.

Following the dissolution of the NIR in 1960, the orchestra initially continued to operate within the shared services of public broadcasting. In 1978, the Belgian Radio and Television (BRT) established the BRT Philharmonic Orchestra. Following the restructuring of the BRT into the BRTN, it became the BRTN Philharmonic Orchestra and was subsequently renamed the Flemish Radio Orchestra.

In 1998, the orchestra became independent of the public broadcaster. On 2 March 1998, the non-profit association Vlaams Omroeporkest en Kamerkoor was established to oversee both the orchestra and what is now the Vlaams Radiokoor (Flemish Radio Choir). The organisation came under the cultural policy of the Flemish Community. In 2005, the orchestra returned to Studio 4 in the renovated Flagey building in Brussels. It adopted its current name, Brussels Philharmonic, in 2008.

== Artistic development and activities ==
=== Artistic leadership and repertoire ===
The Brussels Philharmonic is based in Studio 4 of the Flagey building in Brussels, where it presents its own concert series. Its repertoire includes 19th- and 20th-century symphonic works, contemporary compositions and film music.

Michel Tabachnik became chief conductor in 2008. He was succeeded in 2015 by Stéphane Denève, who placed particular emphasis on 21st-century symphonic repertoire, including recordings of works by French composer Guillaume Connesson. Kazushi Ōno became music director in September 2022. That same year, Ilan Volkov was appointed principal guest conductor, with a particular focus on contemporary and experimental music.

=== Experimental and interdisciplinary projects ===
Alongside its traditional symphonic repertoire, the Brussels Philharmonic programmes contemporary and experimental music. Its LAB-SERIES combines orchestral concerts with other forms of musical experimentation and audience activities. Principal guest conductor Ilan Volkov plays a central role in the orchestra's experimental programming.

On 19 and 20 June 2026, the Brussels Philharmonic organised the first Brussels edition of Tectonics, the experimental music festival founded by Volkov, in collaboration with Ictus and Flagey. The programme included orchestral concerts, improvisation, sound art and new compositions.

Through its Beyond The Score series, the orchestra collaborates with artists from other disciplines, including poetry, visual art and sound art, incorporating their contributions into symphonic concert programmes.

The orchestra has also experimented with alternative arrangements of musicians and audiences. In its Club Surround concert format, presented at venues including Concertgebouw Brugge, audience members sat among the orchestral musicians, who were arranged in a circle around the conductor. The concept was subsequently developed into productions under the name Surround XL.

=== Concert activities and international performances ===
In addition to its concerts at Flagey, the Brussels Philharmonic performs at other venues in Belgium and abroad. The orchestra has appeared at the Musikverein in Vienna, the Philharmonie de Paris and the Concertgebouw in Amsterdam. In 2017, it toured Japan, and on 16 March 2019 it made its Carnegie Hall debut in New York.

The Brussels Philharmonic has accompanied the finals of the Queen Elisabeth Competition on several occasions. In 2017, under Stéphane Denève, it accompanied the competition's inaugural cello edition. It returned for the cello final in 2022. In May 2025, conducted by Kazushi Ōno, the orchestra accompanied the piano final for the first time.

During the COVID-19 pandemic, the Brussels Philharmonic and the Vlaams Radiokoor performed concerts without audiences, which were broadcast online. In 2021, the Brussels Philharmonic was among seven Flemish arts organisations that established Podium 19, a temporary cultural channel broadcasting concerts and performances on television and online, in collaboration with broadcasters including VRT. The Brussels Philharmonic coordinated the project. During the same period, the orchestra developed the BXLphil mobile application, offering digital programme notes, concert information, livestreams and other audiovisual content in collaboration with Belgian technology company Appmiral.

=== Film music and collaborations ===
The Brussels Philharmonic has also been involved in recording film scores. The orchestra contributed to the soundtrack of Martin Scorsese's The Aviator (2004), composed by Howard Shore. Shore received the Golden Globe Award for Best Original Score in 2005. In 2011, the Brussels Philharmonic recorded Ludovic Bource's score for The Artist, conducted by Ernst van Tiel. Bource received the Academy Award for Best Original Score in 2012.

The orchestra also has a longstanding collaboration with Film Fest Gent and the World Soundtrack Awards. During the annual awards ceremony, the Brussels Philharmonic performs film music by international composers under the direction of Dirk Brossé. The orchestra also takes part in film music recordings and concert productions.

== Organisation and governance ==
The Brussels Philharmonic, together with the Vlaams Radiokoor (Flemish Radio Choir) and the youth orchestra programme, forms part of the non-profit association Brussels Philharmonic vzw, an institution of the Flemish Community.

Gunther Broucke joined the former Vlaams Omroeporkest en Kamerkoor as artistic director in 1998 and became general manager (intendant) in 2003. In 2017, he was named Public Sector Manager of the Year 2016.

On 1 June 2026, Broucke was succeeded by a two-person management team consisting of Steven Cosyns as managing director and Masa Spaan as artistic director. The former general manager position was thereby divided into two separate roles.

Hugo Vandamme served as chairman of the board from 1998 to 2021. He was succeeded in 2021 by Johan Swinnen. Following Swinnen's resignation in November 2023, the Flemish Government appointed Luc Delrue as the new chairman of the board in March 2024.

== Conductors ==
- Franz André (1935–1957)
- Daniel Sternefeld (1958–1971)
- Fernand Terby (1978–1988)
- Alexander Rahbari (1988–1996)
- Frank Shipway (1996–2001)
- Yoel Levi (2001–2007)
- Michel Tabachnik (2008–2015)
- Stéphane Denève (2015–2022)
- Kazushi Ōno (2022–present), music director
- Ilan Volkov (2022–present), principal guest conductor

== Selected recordings ==
CD series include CDs for Warner Classics and recordings for the French center of Romantic music, Palazzetto Bru Zane. The orchestra has notably recorded the scores for The Aviator, composed by Howard Shore, and The Artist, composed by Ludovic Bource. The orchestra received the Choc de Classica and the Diapason d'or of the year in 2016 for their Deutsche Grammophon recording of music of Guillaume Connesson, 'Pour sortir au jour'.

Since 2015, the Brussels Philharmonic has made several recordings for Deutsche Grammophon.

- Connesson – Pour sortir au jour | Brussels Philharmonic & Mathieu Dufour conducted by Stéphane Denève, (2016)
- Prokofiev – Romantic Suites | Brussels Philharmonic conducted by Stéphane Denève, (2017)
- Connesson – Lost Horizon | Brussels Philharmonic & Renaud Capuçon & Timothy McAllister conducted by Stéphane Denève, (2017)
- Voice of Hope | Brussels Philharmonic & Camille Thomas conducted by Stéphane Denève, (2020)

Since 2011, the Brussels Philharmonic has been producing recordings through its own label, Brussels Philharmonic Recordings.

- Debussy – La Mer | Brussels Philharmonic & het Vlaams Radio Koor conducted by Michel Tabachnik, (Brussels Philharmonic Recordings, March 2011)
- Dvorák – Symphony No. 9 | Brussels Philharmonic & Michel Tabachnik, (Brussels Philharmonic Recordings, February 2012)
- Tchaikovsky – Symphony No. 6 | Brussels Philharmonic & Michel Tabachnik, (Brussels Philharmonic Recordings, September 2012)
- Stravinsky – Le sacre du printemps | Brussels Philharmonic & Michel Tabachnik, (Brussels Philharmonic Recordings, January 2013)

== Scorings ==
- 2004 – The Aviator
- 2011 – The Artist
- 2012 – Parade's End
- 2013 – The White Queen
- 2015 – High Rise
- 2015 – Marguerite
- 2015 – Michiel de Ruyter
- 2016 – A Quiet Passion
- 2016 – Knielen op een bed violen
- 2017 – Get Even (game)
- 2017 – Final Fantasy XV: Episode Ignis (game)
- 2018 – El árbol de la sangre
