= Joseph Aloys Schmittbaur =

German composer, Kapellmeister and instrument maker (1718 - 1809)

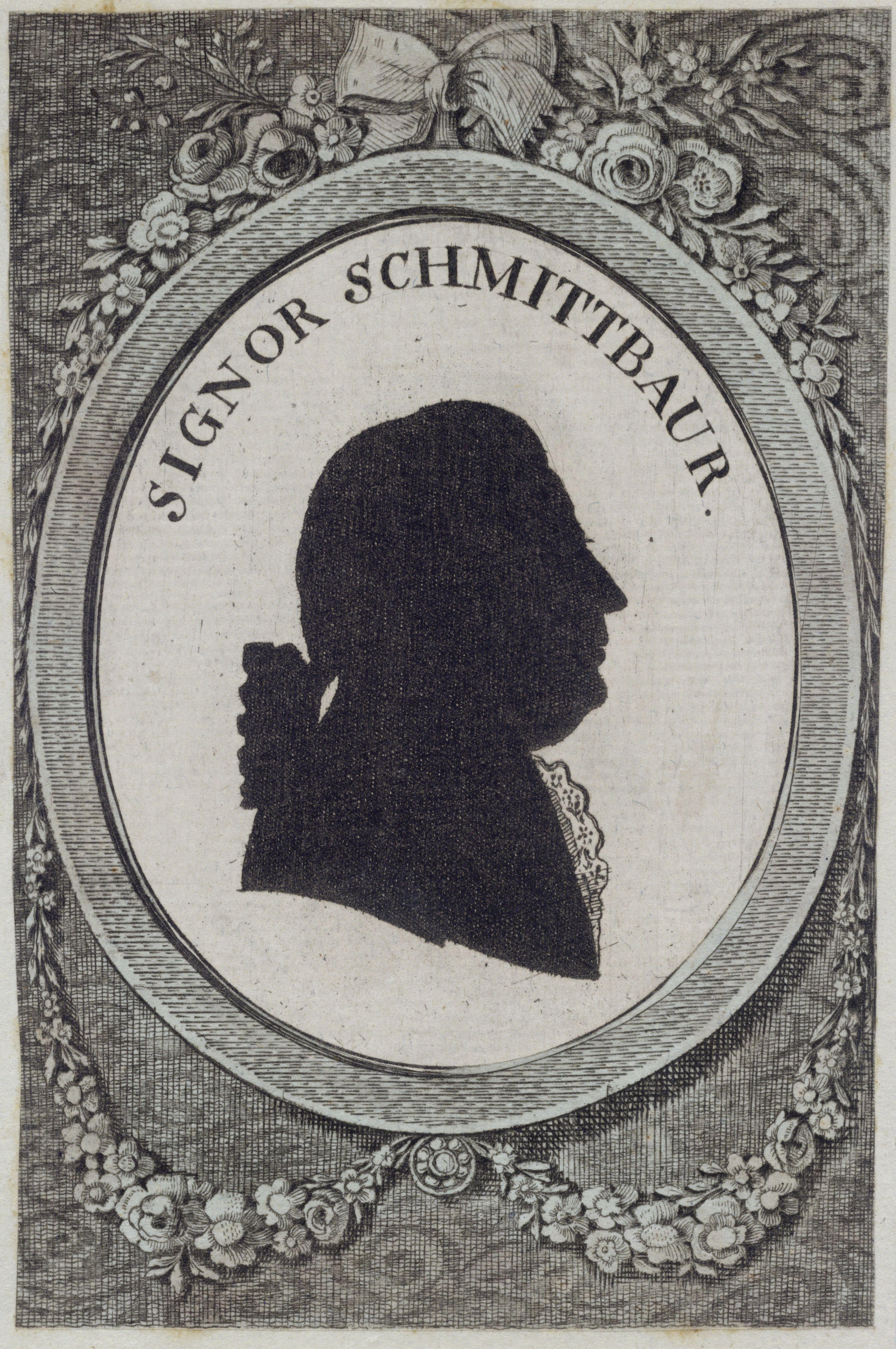
Joseph Aloys Schmittbaur

Joseph Aloys Schmittbaur (also Schmittbauer; 8 November 1718 - 24 October 1809) was a German composer, Kapellmeister, instrument maker and music teacher.

== Life ==
Joseph Aloys Schmittbaur was born in Bamberg and received his musical education from the organ builder of the Würzburg court Johann Philipp Seuffert. He was also a pupil of Niccolò Jommelli, probably in Bologna. Around 1750 he was employed in the court of Rastatt, where he became concertmaster in 1759 and Kapellmeister in 1766. During this time he set German and Italian works for the stage. After the dissolution of Rastatt chapel in 1771, he became concertmaster of the Badische Staatskapelle in Karlsruhe. In January 1775, Schmittbaur was given the position of Kapellmeister of Cologne Cathedral, where he was deeply influenced by the conservative musical activities of the musical academies. Two years later, upon the death of Giacinto Sciatti in 1777, he returned to Karlsruhe to become Kapellmeister. He retired from his duties as Kapellmeister in 1804, leaving his place at the court to his son, Ludwig Joseph Abbe (1755-1829), a composer of Lieder. Three other children of his were musicians: August (b. 1763) was a clarinetist and flutist, Nepomuk was a violinist active near Karlsruhe, and Therese was a singer and keyboard player.

Christian Friedrich Daniel Schubart commented on Schmittbaur that: "He is one of the finest composers of our land, and we only now see what the world long ago had in him."

Schmittbaur was in demand as an organ expert, he also produced replicas of the glass harmonica that Benjamin Franklin had invented in 1762 and improved on them, including one for one of his most famous pupils, the blind Marianne Kirchgessner.

== Style ==
Despite the fact that his works were preclassical in style, he was highly regarded as a composer in the 1780s, especially for his symphonies that follow the model of Mannheim school.

Schmittbaur composed masses, cantatas, symphonies, string quartets, flute quartets, and other chamber music. He also wrote stage works.

His first opera was the serenade L'isola disabitata, which reflects the influence of Niccolò Jommelli, who was active since 1753 in Stuttgart. His theatrical works of the 1770s reflect the influence of Gluck's reform opera.

Among his instrumental compositions, most noted are his chamber works, such as the six quartets for flute and strings, which in the past were erroneously attributed to Joseph Haydn.

== Works ==
=== Operas ===
- L'isola disabitata (serenade, libretto by Pietro Metastasio, 1762, Rastatt)
- Die stumme Liebe (Singspiel, libretto by G. L. Korn, 1767, Rastatt)
- Imeneo in Atene (opera seria, libretto by Silvio Stampiglia, 1768, Rastatt)
- Herkules auf dem Oeta (Vorspiel mit Gesang, libretto by J. B. Michelis, 1771, Hanover)
- Il re pastore (opera seria, libretto by Pietro Metastasio, 1772, Rastatt)
- Lindor und Ismene (Singspiel, libretto by Friedrich Julius Heinrich von Soden, 1771, Karlsruhe)
- Endymion (serenata, libretto by Pietro Metastasio, 1774, Karlsruhe)
- Schuss von Gänsewitz, oder Betrug aus Liebe (Singspiel, libretto by H. F. Möller, 1787, Karlsruhe)
- Epilog am Karlstag (1788, Karlsruhe)

=== Cantatas and other vocal works ===
- Scherzo pastorale (1759)
- Prologue for soprano and orchestra (1782)
- Oster-Cantate, oder die Freunde am Grabe des Erlösers (text by J. C. Walz, 1782)
- 3 cantatas for 1 voice and orchestra
- Klagen nach der Abreise der … Madame Todi for 2 sopranos and instruments (1783, Spayer)
- Die Selbstverläugnung (text by H. J. Tode, 1783)
- Auf die Geburt eines Landesprinzen (text by Walz, 1784, Karlsruhe)
- Friedensfeier in der Schlosskirche (text by Walz, 1806)
- Die Ur-Eltern im ersten Gewitter for 2 sopranos, bass, and orchestra
- Over 45 lieder
- 2 Italian arias

=== Sacred music ===
- Mass in D Major for 4 voices and orchestra (1781, Speyer)
- 4 masses for 4 voices and orchestra
- St. Matthew's Passion
- Requiem for 4 voices and instruments
- Stabat mater
- 14 offertories
- 4 psalms
- Various litanies

=== Instrumental music ===
==== Symphonies ====
- 3 symphonies for 8 (1777)
- Sinfonia hypochondrica (1782)
- 2 symphonies (1795)
- 1 symphony for the marriage of Prince-Elector Maximilian I Joseph of Bavaria and Caroline of Baden (1799)
- at least 21 other symphonies (1760–75)

==== Concertos ====
- Concerto for violin (1773)
- 7 concertos for trumpet (1773-4)
- Concerto for oboe (1781)
- 2 concertos for horn (1782)
- 3 concertos for bassoon
- Several concertos for flute

==== Chamber music ====
- 4 quartets for flute, two violins and cello
- 5 quartets for flute, violin, cello and harpsichord
- 6 quartets for harpsichord/fortepiano, flute, violin and bass
- 3 quartets for flute, two violins (or violin and viola) and cello
- Quartetto périodique for flute, violin, viola, and cello
- Trio for oboe, violin and bass
- Sonatina for flute, harpsichord and cello
- 3 trios for two flutes and cello
- 7 divertimentos and partitas for 5-10 wind instruments

==== Keyboard music ====
- Over 35 pieces for keyboard
- 24 organ preludes and postludes
- 5 preludes and a rondo for glass harmonica/fortepiano
- 18 sinfonies for harpsichord
- 2 rondos and prelude for keyboard

== Notes ==
This page is based on articles from the German and Italian Wikipedias.
