= Karl Dammer =

German conductor

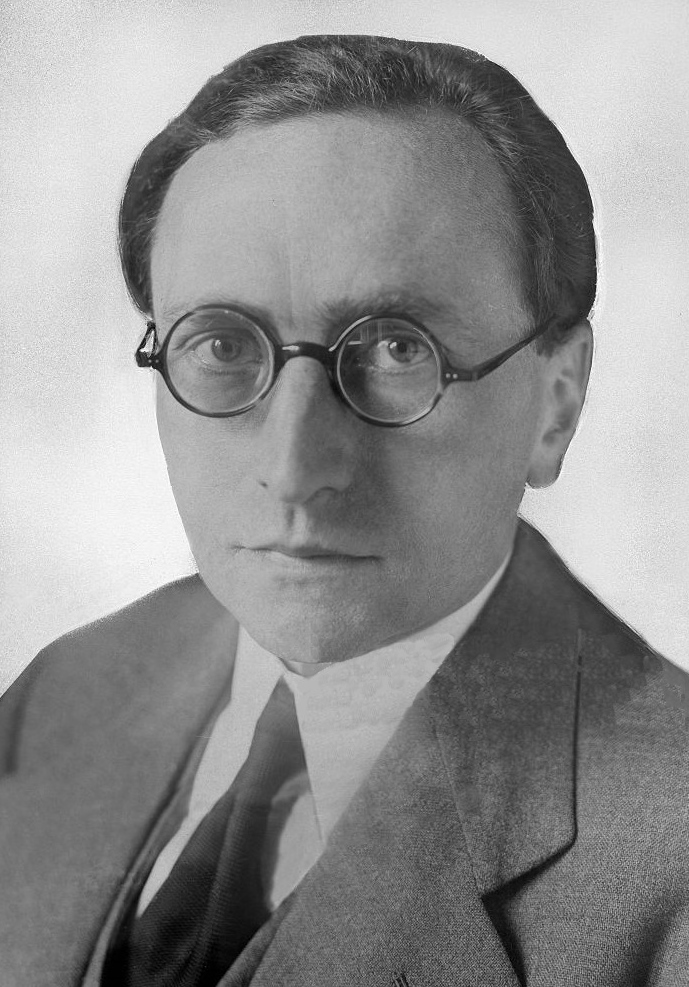
Karl Dammer c. 1922

Karl Dammer (2 January 1894 – 4 February 1977) was a German conductor, Generalmusikdirektor at the Städtische Oper Berlin from 1937.

== Life ==
Born in Elberfeld, Dammer grew up in Wuppertal-Elberfeld as the oldest child of Gustav Dammer and his wife Josefine. His father came from Breyell on the Lower Rhine, was a merchant and died when his son was 15, his mother was the daughter of the merchant Caspar Giani from Aachen. After finishing school, he studied music at the Conservatoire de Strasbourg with Hermann Grabner and Hans Pfitzner, became Pfitzner's assistant and met Otto Klemperer, nine years his senior, who was Pfitzner's deputy at the opera and principal conductor of the Orchestre philharmonique de Strasbourg.

In 1914, he went to the Cologne Opera together with Klemperer and was répétiteur and Kapellmeister there until the end of the war. After that, he worked at the opera houses in Riga, Trier, Aachen and Bremen, where he performed the opera Soldaten by Manfred Gurlitt in 1931.

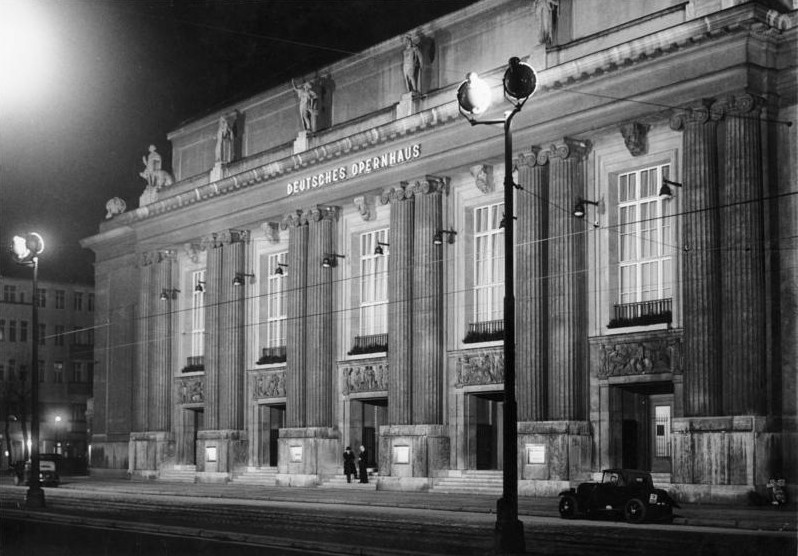
Städtische Oper Berlin in 1936

In 1934, he came to the Städtische Oper Berlin and was appointed Generalmusikdirektor by Hitler in 1937. There, he conducted Madama Butterfly by Giacomo Puccini, among others, but also symphonic works by Johannes Brahms and Anton Bruckner. In 1937, he conducted the world premiere of Kurt Atterberg's "Värmland Rhapsody", his musical energy was praised in the international press at the time. In 1939, he was replaced in this position by Artur Rother. Dammer now also joined the NSDAP and returned to the Cologne Opera as successor of Fritz Zaun as general music director. There, together with his Kapellmeister Günter Wand and Alfred Eichmann, he supervised about 60 opera performances per season. After the destruction of the Cologne Opera House by the air raids in 1943, his work in Cologne was terminated in 1944.

As early as 1946, he played his part in the reconstruction of musical theatre life as musical director of the Bonn Opera and conducted a series of symphony concerts alongside the municipal music director Gustav Classens. Since 1949, Dammer was only active as a guest conductor of symphony concerts. In 1959, he recorded orchestral works by Ludwig van Beethoven with the Stuttgart State Orchestra. He spent the rest of his life in Kreuzlingen on Lake Constance in Switzerland where he died at the age of 83.

== Recordings ==
- Beethoven: Symphony No. 3, Staatsorchester Stuttgart, Club mondial du disque 347, Stuttgart 1959
- Beethoven, Piano Concerto No. 5, Staatsorchester Stuttgart, Soloist: Walter Bohle, Club mondial du disque 348, Stuttgart 1959
- Beethoven: Symphony No. 7, Staatsorchester Stuttgart, Club mondial du disque 352, Stuttgart 1959
- Beethoven: Symphony No. 6 "Pastorale", Staatsorchester Stuttgart, Club mondial du disque 356, Stuttgart 1959
