= Leopold Reichwein =

German conductor and composer

Leopold Reichwein (16 May 1878 – 8 April 1945) was a German conductor and composer.

== Life ==
Born in Breslau, Reichwein was court Kapellmeister of the Badische Staatskapelle Karlsruhe from 1909 to 1913. In 1913 he succeeded Bruno Walter as conductor of the Vienna Court Opera. With Wilhelm Furtwängler he was concert director of the Gesellschaft der Musikfreunde in Vienna from 1921 to 1927. From 1926 to 1938 he conducted the Bochumer Symphoniker. Under his direction, the modern compositions of Paul Hindemith, Ernst Krenek, Erwin Schulhoff and Anton Webern, which had been cultivated by this orchestra until then, took a back seat to the repertoire in favour of classical-romantic music. When in 1932 he published the article Die Juden in der deutschen Musik in the party newspaper of the NSDAP Völkischer Beobachter, which was based on Richard Wagner's antisemitic pamphlet Das Judenthum in der Musik, he drew the wrath of the Bochum citizens, who were still willing to resist.

Reichwein was a convinced Nazi and belonged to the NSDAP as early as 1932 (number 1.009.765) and the völkisch minded, antisemitic Kampfbund für deutsche Kultur. He published among other things heated tirades in the Völkischer Beobachter against Jewish composers such as Felix Mendelssohn Bartholdy, who he primarily accused of financial interests as the driving force of their artistic creation. After the seizure of power by the Nazis he was a member of the Reichsmusikkammer. On 20 April 1938 Hitler appointed him Generalmusikdirektor. After the invasion and Anschluss of Austria he propagated the call for a "referendum" with the following words: "Since Adolf Hitler has reconquered freedom for us German artists in Austria, it is our deepest need to prove our gratitude by confession and deed." In the following period he was conductor at the Vienna State Opera and director of the conducting class at the University of Music and Performing Arts Vienna. Reichwein founded the NS. Wiener Tonkünstler Orchester anew.

Towards the end of the Second World War, Reichwein chose suicide at age 66 in Vienna.

His works include operas, operettas, stage music and songs.
