= Anthony Bramall =

English conductor

Anthony Bramall is a British conductor.

== Career ==
Born in London, Bramall studied singing at the Guildhall School of Music and Drama and subsequently completed postgraduate studies in conducting there with Maestro Vilem Tausky. At the same time he was musical director of the Southend Symphony Orchestra and the New Westminster Chorus.

In 1981, he became assistant to the general music director of the Stadttheater Pforzheim. In 1984, as part of the 3rd International Hans Swarowsky Conducting Competition Vienna, he was awarded the special prize for the interpretation of 20th century music. In 1987, he made his debut with the Vienna Chamber Orchestra at the Vienna Konzerthaus. In 1985, he was Kapellmeister at the Städtische Bühnen Augsburg. From 1986 to 1989, he was study director and assistant to Bruno Weil at the Theater Augsburg. In 1989, he went to the Landestheater Coburg as 1st Kapellmeister. In 1990, he received an engagement as Kapellmeister and later became 1st Kapellmeister at the Staatstheater Hannover in Lower Saxony. There he cultivated a close collaboration with the NDR Symphony Orchestra in Hanover. In 1995, Bramall became general music director at the Theater Krefeld und Mönchengladbach. From 2002 to 2008 he was general music director at the Badisches Staatstheater Karlsruhe. From 2008 to 2011, he was professor of the conducting class for music theatre at the Musikhochschule Weimar. At the beginning of the 2011/12 season, Bramall became permanent guest conductor at the Leipzig Opera.

Since September 2017, he has been chief conductor of the Staatstheater am Gärtnerplatz, Munich.

== Guest engagements ==
Guest engagements have taken him to the Bayerische Staatsoper Munich, the Semperoper Dresden (including musical direction of the new productions La Cenerentola and Madama Butterfly), the Staatsoper Hannover, the Staatstheater am Gärtnerplatz Munich, the RIAS Radio Orchestra Berlin. He has also appeared as a guest conductor in Gothenburg, Bonn, Darmstadt, Dresden, Düsseldorf, Hanover, Karlsruhe, Wiesbaden, Bratislava, Bucharest, Poznan, as well as at the Teatro Lirico in Cagliari, with the Tokyo Metropolitan Symphony Orchestra Japan, in Mexico City and in the US.

== Recordings ==
Bramall recorded three CDs with the Slovak Philharmonic and the Slovak Radio Orchestra, followed by radio recordings with the RIAS Orchestra Berlin.

- Handel, Israel in Egypt, Orchester der Deutschen Händel Solisten
- Mahler, Symphony No. 8 with the Badischen Staatskapelle
