= Der fliegende Holländer discography =

This is a partial discography of Der fliegende Holländer (The Flying Dutchman) by Richard Wagner. The list includes live and studio performances in audio and/or video recordings.

== Recordings ==
| Year | Cast (Der Holländer, Senta, Daland, Erik, Der Steuermann, Mary) | Conductor, Opera house and orchestra | Label |
|---|---|---|---|
| 1936 | Hans-Hermann Nissen; Margarete Teschemacher; Ludwig Weber; Torsten Ralf; Karl Ostertag; Magda Strack | Carl Leonhardt; Sächsische Staatsoper Dresden Orchestra & Chorus (studio recording) | Audio CD: Preiser; Cat: PR90132 |
| 1936 | Fred Destal; Marjorie Lawrence; Alexander Kipnis; René Maison; Hanns Fleischer; Irra Petina | Fritz Busch; Teatro Colón Orchestra & Chorus | Audio CD: Pearl; Cat: |
| 1937 | Herbert Janssen; Kirsten Flagstad; Ludwig Weber; Max Lorenz; Ben Williams; Mary Jarred | Fritz Reiner; Royal Opera House Orchestra & Chorus | Audio CD: Discocorp; Cat: 170863 |
| 1942 | Joel Berglund; Maria Müller; Ludwig Hofmann; Franz Völker; Erik Zimmermann; Lilo Asmus | Richard Kraus; Bayreuth Festival Orchestra & Chorus | Audio CD: Preiser; Cat: |
| 1944 | Hans Hotter; Viorica Ursuleac; Georg Hann; Karl Ostertag; Franz Klarwein; Luise Willer | Clemens Krauss; Bavarian State Opera Orchestra & Chorus | Audio CD: Preiser; Cat: PR90250 |
| 1950 | Hans Hotter; Astrid Varnay; Sven Nilsson; Set Svanholm; Thomas Hayward; Hertha Glaz | Fritz Reiner; Metropolitan Opera Orchestra & Chorus | Audio CD: Naxos; Cat: 8.110189-90 |
| 1951 | Hans Hotter; Helene Werth; Kurt Böhme; Bernd Aldenhoff; Helmut Krebs; Res Fischer | Wilhelm Schüchter; Norddeutscher Rundfunk Orchestra (studio recording) | Audio CD: Walhall; Cat:WLCD0038 |
| 1952 | Josef Metternich; Annelies Kupper; Josef Greindl; Wolfgang Windgassen; Ernst Haefliger; Sieglinde Wagner | Ferenc Fricsay; Deutsches Symphonie-Orchester Berlin (studio recording) | Audio CD: Preiser; Cat: PR20036 |
| 1955 | Hermann Uhde; Astrid Varnay; Ludwig Weber; Rudolf Lustig; Josef Traxel; Elisabeth Schärtel | Joseph Keilberth; Bayreuth Festival Orchestra & Chorus | Audio CD: Testament; Cat: SBT21384 |
| 1955 | Hermann Uhde; Astrid Varnay; Ludwig Weber; Wolfgang Windgassen; Josef Traxel; Elisabeth Schärtel | Hans Knappertsbusch; Bayreuth Festival Orchestra & Chorus | Audio CD: Walhall; Cat: WLCD0161 |
| 1956 | George London; Astrid Varnay; Arnold van Mill; Josef Traxel; Jean Cox; Elisabeth Schärtel | Joseph Keilberth; Bayreuth Festival Orchestra & Chorus | Audio CD: Walhall; Cat: WLCD0190 |
| 1959 | George London; Leonie Rysanek; Josef Greindl; Fritz Uhl; Georg Paskuda; Res Fischer | Wolfgang Sawallisch; Bayreuth Festival Orchestra & Chorus | Audio CD: Opera D'Oro; Cat: ODO 7030 |
| 1960 | George London; Leonie Rysanek; Giorgio Tozzi; Karl Liebl; Richard Lewis; Rosalind Elias | Antal Doráti; Royal Opera House Orchestra & Chorus (recorded at Waltham Forest Town Hall) | Audio CD: Decca Records; Cat: |
| 1960 | Dietrich Fischer-Dieskau; Marianne Schech; Gottlob Frick; Rudolf Schock; Fritz Wunderlich; Sieglinde Wagner | Franz Konwitschny; Berliner Staatskapelle; Berlin State Choir (studio recording) | Audio CD: Brilliant Classics; Cat: |
| 1961 | Franz Crass; Anja Silja; Josef Greindl; Fritz Uhl; Georg Paskuda; Res Fischer | Wolfgang Sawallisch; Bayreuth Festival Orchestra & Chorus | Audio CD: Philips; Cat: |
| 1963 | George London; Leonie Rysanek; Giorgio Tozzi; Sándor Kónya; George Shirley; Lili Chookasian | Karl Böhm; Metropolitan Opera Orchestra & Chorus | Audio CD: Gala; Cat: GL100728 |
| 1966 | Franz Crass; Leonie Rysanek; Karl Ridderbusch; Claude Heater ??? Anne Marie Bessel | Wolfgang Sawallisch; Teatro alla Scala Orchestra & Chorus | Audio CD: Opera D'oro; Cat: |
| 1968 | Theo Adam; Anja Silja; Martti Talvela; Ernst Kozub; Gerhard Unger; Annelies Burmeister | Otto Klemperer; Philharmonia Orchestra; BBC Chorus (studio recording) | Audio CD: EMI Classics; Cat: 5674082 |
| 1969 | Franz Crass; Ingrid Bjoner; Karl Ridderbusch; Sven Olof Eliasson; Thomas Lehrberger; Regina Fonseca | Wolfgang Sawallisch; Orchestra Sinfonica and Coro di Roma RAI (studio recording) | Audio CD: Myto; Cat: 78936879412 |
| 1971 | Thomas Stewart; Gwyneth Jones; Karl Ridderbusch; Hermin Esser; Harald Ek; Sieglinde Wagner | Karl Böhm; Bayreuth Festival Orchestra & Chorus | Audio CD: Deutsche Grammophon; Cat: E4377102 |
| 1974 | Donald McIntyre; Catarina Ligendza; Bengt Rundgren; Hermann Winkler; Harald Ek; Ruth Hesse | Wolfgang Sawallisch; Bavarian State Orchestra and Chorus | DVD: Deutsche Grammophon; Cat: 073 4433; Cat: 001099309 |
| 1976 | Norman Bailey; Janis Martin; Martti Talvela; René Kollo; Werner Krenn; Isola Jones | Georg Solti; Chicago Symphony Orchestra and Chorus (studio recording) | Audio CD: Decca/London; Cat: 4833102 |
| 1981- 1983 | José van Dam; Dunja Vejzovic; Kurt Moll; Peter Hofmann; Thomas Moser; Kaja Borris | Herbert von Karajan; Berlin Philharmonic Orchestra; Vienna State Opera Chorus (studio recording) | Audio CD: EMI Classics; Cat: |
| 1985 | Simon Estes; Lisbeth Balslev; Matti Salminen; Robert Schunk; Graham Clark; Anny Schlemm | Woldemar Nelsson; Bayreuth Festival Orchestra & Chorus | DVD: Deutsche Grammophon; Cat: 0734041; Audio CD: Philips "Digital Classics"; Cat: 416300-2 (2cd) |
| 1989 | Franz Grundheber; Hildegard Behrens; Matti Salminen; Raimo Sirkiä; Jorma Silvasti; Anita Välkki | Leif Segerstam; Savonlinna Opera Festival Orchestra & Chorus | DVD: Warner Music; Cat: 903 71486 2 |
| 1991 | Bernd Weikl; Cheryl Studer; Hans Sotin; Plácido Domingo; Peter Seiffert; Uta Priew | Giuseppe Sinopoli; Deutsche Oper Berlin Orchestra & Chorus (studio recording) | Audio CD: Deutsche Grammophon; Cat: 4377782 |
| 1991 | Robert Hale; Hildegard Behrens; Kurt Rydl; Peter Josef Protschka; Uwe Heilmann; Iris Vermillion | Christoph von Dohnányi; Vienna Philharmonic; Vienna State Opera Chorus (studio recording) | Audio CD: Decca; Cat: 436 418-2 |
| 1991 | Robert Hale; Julia Varady; Jaakko Ryhänen; Peter Seiffert; Ulrich Ress; Anny Schlemm | Wolfgang Sawallisch; Bavarian State Opera Orchestra & Chorus | VHS: EMI; Cat: 77801; Cat: MVD 99 1311-3 |
| 1992 | Alfred Muff; Ingrid Haubold; Erich Knodt; Peter Seiffert; Jörg Hering; Marga Schiml | Pinchas Steinberg; Vienna ORF Symphony Orchestra; Budapest Radio Chorus (studio recording) | Audio CD: Naxos; Cat:8660025-26 |
| 1994 | James Morris; Deborah Voigt; Jan-Hendrik Rootering; Ben Heppner; Paul Groves; Birgitta Svendén | James Levine; Metropolitan Opera Orchestra & Chorus (studio recording) | Audio CD: Sony; Cat: |
| 2001 | Falk Struckmann; Jane Eaglen; Robert Holl; Peter Seiffert; Rolando Villazón; Felicity Palmer | Daniel Barenboim; Berlin State Opera Orchestra & Chorus; Berliner Staatskapelle (studio recording) | Audio CD: Teldec; Cat: |
| 2004 | John Tomlinson; Nina Stemme; Eric Halfvarson; Kim Begley; Peter Wedd; Patricia Bardon | David Parry; London Philharmonic Orchestra; Geoffrey Mitchell Choir (studio recording) | Audio CD: Chandos; Cat: |
| 2005 | Terje Stensvold; Astrid Weber; Franz-Josef Selig; Jörg Dürmüller; Kobie van Rensburg; Simone Schröder | Bruno Weil; Cappella Coloniensis Orchestra & Chorus (studio recording of original 1841 version) | Audio CD: DHM; Cat: 82876 64071 2 |
| 2005 | Juha Uusitalo; Päivi Nisula; Matti Salminen; Jorma Silvasti; Dan Karlström; Tiina Penttinen | Pertti Pekkanen; Turku Philharmonic Orchestra & Chorus | DVD: TFO live Cat: |
| 2013 | Samuel Youn; Ricarda Merbeth; Franz-Josef Selig; Tomislav Mužek; Benjamin Bruns; Christa Mayer | Christian Thielemann; Bayreuth Festival Orchestra & chorus | DVD: Opus Arte; Cat: |
| 2013 | Terje Stensvold; Kwangchul Youn; Anja Kampe; Christopher Ventris; Jane Henschel; Thomas Russell | Andris Nelsons; Concertgebouw Orchestra; Chor des Bayerischen Rundfunks; WDR Rundfunkchor Köln; NDR Chor (Recorded live at the Concertgebouw, Amsterdam) | SACD/CD: RCO Live; Cat: RCO14004 |
| 2019 | Thomas Gazheli; Marjorie Owens; Mikhail Petrenko; Bernhard Berchtold; Timothy Oliver; Annette Jahns | Fabio Luisi; Orchestra and Chorus of the Maggio Musicale Fiorentino | DVD: C Major; Cat:753904 |
| 2020 | Evgeny Nikitin; Anja Kampe; Franz-Josef Selig; Sergey Skorokhodov; David Portillo; Mihoko Fujimura | Valery Gergiev; Orchestra and Chorus of the Metropolitan Opera | Streaming HD video: Met Opera on Demand |
| 2024 | Gerald Finley; Lise Davidsen; Brindley Sherratt; Stanislas de Barbeyrac; Eirik Grøtvedt; Anna Kissjudi | Edward Gardner, Norwegian National Opera Orchestra and Chorus | CD: Decca; Cat: 4870952 |
