= Fidelio discography =

This is a partial discography of Fidelio, a Singspiel in two acts by Ludwig van Beethoven. Beethoven had originally written a three-act version of the opera called Leonore, first performed in 1805 and then re-staged with revisions in 1806. Despite the name change, the heroine is the title character in both cases. Leonore disguises herself as a boy, Fidelio, in order to find out what has happened to her husband, Florestan, who is being illegally held by Pizarro, a prison governor. The other major characters are the gaoler Rocco and his daughter Marzelline.

== Audio ==
| Year | Fidelio/Leonore Florestan Pizarro Rocco Marzelline | Conductor, Opera house and orchestra | Label |
|---|---|---|---|
| 1936 | Lotte Lehmann; Koloman von Pataky; Alfred Jerger; Anton Baumann; Luise Helletsgruber | Arturo Toscanini; Vienna Philharmonic orchestra Vienna State Opera chorus (recorded act one only on 25 July at Salzburg Festival) | CD: The Radio Years; Cat: RY 70 |
| 1938 | Kirsten Flagstad; René Maison; Friedrich Schorr; Emanuel List; Marita Farell | Artur Bodanzky; Metropolitan Opera orchestra & chorus | CD: Naxos Historical; Cat: |
| 1943 | Hilde Konetzni; Torsten Ralf; Paul Schöffler; Herbert Alsen; Irmgard Seefried | Karl Böhm; Vienna State Opera orchestra & chorus | LP: Vox; Cat: Andante; Cat: 3090 |
| 1944 | Rose Bampton; Jan Peerce; Herbert Janssen; Sid Belarsky; Eleanor Steber | Arturo Toscanini; NBC Symphony Orchestra & chorus | LP: RCA Victor; Cat: LM-6025; CD: RCA Victor; Cat: 60273 |
| 1948 | Erna Schlüter; Julius Patzak; Ferdinand Frantz; Herbert Alsen; Lisa Della Casa | Wilhelm Furtwängler; Vienna Philharmonic orchestra Vienna State Opera chorus | CD: Melodram; Cat: CDM 25009 |
| 1948 | Anna Bathy; Endre Rösler; Oszkár Maleczky; Mihály Székely; Mária Mátyás | Otto Klemperer; Hungarian State Opera orchestra & chorus (sung in Hungarian) | CD: Urania; Cat: URN 22246 |
| 1950 | Kirsten Flagstad; Julius Patzak; Paul Schöffler; Josef Greindl; Elisabeth Schwarzkopf | Wilhelm Furtwängler; Vienna Philharmonic orchestra Vienna State Opera chorus (recorded on 5 August at Salzburg Festival) | CD: Regis Records Ltd; Cat: RRC2048 |
| 1953 | Martha Mödl; Wolfgang Windgassen; Otto Edelmann; Gottlob Frick; Sena Jurinac | Wilhelm Furtwängler; Vienna Philharmonic orchestra Vienna State Opera chorus | CD: EMI; Cat: 64496 |
| 1956 | Birgit Nilsson; Hans Hopf; Paul Schöffler; Gottlob Frick; Ingeborg Wenglor | Erich Kleiber; WDR Symphony Orchestra Cologne; WDR Rundfunkchor Köln | CD: Opera d'Oro; Cat: OPD 1332 |
| 1957 | Leonie Rysanek; Ernst Haefliger; Dietrich Fischer-Dieskau; Gottlob Frick; Irmgard Seefried | Ferenc Fricsay; Bavarian State Opera orchestra & chorus | CD: Deutsche Grammophon; Cat: DG 453106-2 |
| 1957 | Gladys Kuchta; Julius Patzak; Heinz Rehfuss; Karl Kümmel; Melitta Muszely | Carl Bamberger; NDR Elbphilharmonie Orchestra & chorus | CD: Nonesuch Records; Cat: |
| 1957 | Christel Goltz; Giuseppe Zampieri; Paul Schöffler; Otto Edelmann; Sena Jurinac | Herbert von Karajan; Vienna Philharmonic orchestra Vienna State Opera chorus | CD: Orfeo; Cat: C 7710821 |
| 1958 | Gré Brouwenstijn; Hans Hopf; Paul Schöffler; Arnold van Mill; Olga Chelavine | Thomas Beecham; Teatro Colón orchestra & chorus | CD: Legato Classics; Cat: LCD 226-2 |
| 1960 | Galina Vishnevskaya; Georgii Nelepp; Aleksey Petrovich Ivanov; Nikolai Shchelgolkov; Irina Maslennikova | Alexander Melik-Pashayev; Bolshoi Theatre orchestra & chorus | CD: Audio Encyclopedia; Cat: AE 207 |
| 1961 | Sena Jurinac; Jan Peerce; Gustav Neidlinger; Dezső Ernster; Maria Stader | Hans Knappertsbusch; Bavarian State Opera orchestra & chorus | CD: Westminster; Cat: 471 204-2 |
| 1961 | Sena Jurinac; Jon Vickers; Hans Hotter; Gottlob Frick; Elsie Morrison | Otto Klemperer; Royal Opera House orchestra & chorus | CD: Testament; Cat: SBT2 1328 |
| 1962 | Christa Ludwig; Jon Vickers; Walter Berry; Gottlob Frick; Ingeborg Hallstein | Otto Klemperer; Philharmonia Orchestra; Philharmonia Chorus | CD: EMI; Cat: 67361 |
| 1962 | Christa Ludwig; Jon Vickers; Walter Berry; Walter Kreppel; Gundula Janowitz | Herbert von Karajan; Vienna State Opera orchestra & chorus | CD: Deutsche Grammophon; Cat: 477 7364 |
| 1963 | Christa Ludwig; James King; Gustav Neidlinger; Josef Greindl; Lisa Otto | Karl Böhm; Deutsche Oper Berlin orchestra & chorus | CD: Canyon Classics; Cat: PCCL 00060 |
| 1964 | Birgit Nilsson; James McCracken; Tom Krause; Kurt Böhme; Graziella Sciutti | Lorin Maazel; Vienna Philharmonic orchestra Vienna State Opera chorus | CD: Decca; Cat: 448104 |
| 1969 | Christa Ludwig; James King; Ingvar Wixell; Franz Crass; Edith Mathis | Karl Böhm; Vienna Philharmonic orchestra Vienna State Opera chorus (recorded at Salzburg Festival) | CD: Opera d’Oro; Cat: 1380 |
| 1969 | Gwyneth Jones; James King; Theo Adam; Franz Crass; Edith Mathis | Karl Böhm; Staatskapelle Dresden orchestra & chorus | CD: Deutsche Grammophon; Cat: DG 477 5584 |
| 1970 | Gwyneth Jones; James King; Theo Adam; Franz Crass; Lucia Popp | Leonard Bernstein; Vienna Philharmonic orchestra Vienna State Opera chorus | CD: Opera Depot; Cat: OD 10175-2 |
| 1970 | Helga Dernesch; Jon Vickers; Zoltan Kelemen; Karl Ridderbusch; Helen Donath | Herbert von Karajan; Berlin Philharmonic; Deutsche Oper Berlin chorus | CD: EMI; Cat: CMS 7 69290-2 |
| 1970 | Ingrid Bjoner; Jon Vickers; Gustav Neidlinger; Franz Crass; Renate Holm | Ferdinand Leitner; Teatro Colón orchestra & chorus (recorded on 11 September) | CD: Operadepot.com; Cat: |
| 1976 | Teresa Kubiak; Jon Vickers; Richard Van Allan; Donald Gramm; Magdelena Falewicz | Sarah Caldwell; Boston Grand Opera House orchestra & chorus Harvard Glee Club | CD: VAI; Cat: VAIA 1222-2 |
| 1978 | Gundula Janowitz; René Kollo; Hans Sotin; Manfred Jungwirth; Lucia Popp | Leonard Bernstein; Vienna Philharmonic orchestra Vienna State Opera chorus | CD: Deutsche Grammophon; Cat: 526702 |
| 1978 | Hildegard Behrens; James King; Donald McIntyre; Kurt Moll; Lucia Popp | Karl Böhm; Bavarian State Opera orchestra & chorus | CD: Premiere Opera Ltd; Cat: CDNO 1142-2 |
| 1979 | Hildegard Behrens; Peter Hofmann; Theo Adam; Hans Sotin; Sonia Ghazarian | Georg Solti; Chicago Symphony Orchestra & chorus | CD: Decca Records; Cat: 410227 |
| 1982 | Jeannine Altmeyer; Siegfried Jerusalem; Siegmund Nimsgern; Peter Meven; Carola Nossek | Kurt Masur; Leipzig Gewandhaus Orchestra & chorus | CD: Eurodisc; Cat: GK 69030 |
| 1989 | Jessye Norman; Reiner Goldberg; Ekkehard Wlaschiha; Kurt Moll; Pamela Coburn | Bernard Haitink; Staatskapelle Dresden orchestra & chorus | CD: Philips; Cat: 426308 |
| 1990 | Gabriele Schnaut; Josef Protschka; Hartmut Welker; Kurt Rydl; Ruth Ziesak | Christoph von Dohnányi; Vienna Philharmonic orchestra Vienna State Opera chorus | CD: Decca; Cat: 436627 |
| 1994 | Charlotte Margiono; Peter Seiffert; Sergei Leiferkus; László Polgár; Barbara Bonney | Nikolaus Harnoncourt; Chamber Orchestra of Europe; Arnold Schoenberg Choir | CD: Teldec; Cat: 994560 |
| 1995 | Deborah Voigt; Ben Heppner; Günter von Kannen; Matthias Hölle; Elisabeth Norberg-Schulz | Colin Davis; Bavarian Radio Symphony Orchestra & chorus | CD: BMG-RCA Victor; Cat: 09026 68344-2 |
| 1997 | Gabriela Beňačková; Anthony Rolfe Johnson; Franz-Josef Kapellmann; Siegfried Vogel; Ildiko Vogel | Charles Mackerras; Scottish Chamber Orchestra; Edinburgh Festival chorus | CD: Teldarc; Cat: 80439 |
| 1999 | Inga Nielsen; Gösta Winbergh; Alan Titus; Kurt Moll; Edith Lienbacher | Michael Halász; Nicolaus Esterházy Sinfonia; Hungarian Radio Chorus | CD: Naxos; Cat: 8.660070-71 |
| 1999 | Waltraud Meier; Plácido Domingo; Falk Struckmann; René Pape; Soile Isokoski | Daniel Barenboim; Staatskapelle Berlin orchestra Deutsche Oper Berlin chorus | CD: Teldec; Cat: 3984 25249-2 |
| 2003 | Angela Denoke; Jon Villars; Alan Held; László Polgár; Juliane Banse | Simon Rattle; Berlin Philharmonic orchestra Arnold Schoenberg choir | CD: EMI; Cat: 0724355755520 |
| 2006 | Christine Brewer; John MacMaster; Juha Uusitalo; Kristinn Sigmundsson; Sally Matthews | Colin Davis; London Symphony Orchestra & chorus | CD: LSO Live; Cat: 0593 |
| 2011 | Nina Stemme; Jonas Kaufmann; Falk Struckmann; Christof Fischesser; Rachel Harnisch | Claudio Abbado; Lucerne Festival orchestra Arnold Schoenberg choir | CD: Decca; Cat: 0289 478 2551 7 |

== Audio (1805 version) ==
This is a partial discography of Leonore, the 1805 original three-act version of the two-act opera Fidelio.

| Year | Cast (Fidelio/Leonore Florestan, Pizarro Rocco, Marzelline) | Conductor, Opera house and orchestra | Label |
|---|---|---|---|
| 1960 | Hilde Zadek; Anton Dermota; Alfred Pfeifel; Paul Schöffler; Gerda Schreyer | Ferdinand Leitner; Vienna Philharmonic orchestra Bregenzer Festspiele chorus | CD: Opera D'Oro; Cat: OPD 1210 |
| 1976 | Edda Moser; Richard Cassilly; Karl Ridderbusch; Theo Adam; Helen Donath | Herbert Blomstedt; Staatskapelle Dresden; Leipzig Radio chorus | CD: Berlin Classics; Cat: 11402BC |
| 1997 | Hillevi Martinpelto; Kim Begley; Matthew Best; Franz Hawlata; Christiane Oelze | John Eliot Gardiner; Orchestre Révolutionnaire et Romantique; Monteverdi Choir | CD: Archiv; Cat: 0453 461-2 |
| 2019 | Marlis Petersen; Robin Johannseney; Maximilian Schmitt; Johannes Weisser; Dimitry Ivaschenko | René Jacobs; Freiburger Barockorchester; Zürcher Sing-Akademie | CD: Harmonia Mundi France; Cat: HMM 902414.15 |

== Audio (1806 version) ==
This is a discography of Leonore, the 1806 version of the two-act opera Fidelio.

| Year | Cast | Conductor, orchestra & chorus | Label |
|---|---|---|---|
| 1998 | Pamela Coburn Mark Baker Jean-Philippe Lafont Victor von Halem Christine Neithardt-Barbaux | Marc Soustrot Beethoven Orchester Bonn WDR Rundfunkchor | CD: MDG Cat: 337 0826-2 |

== Video ==
| Year | Cast (Fidelio/Leonore Florestan, Pizarro Rocco, Marzelline) | Conductor, Opera house and orchestra | Label |
|---|---|---|---|
| 1963 | Christa Ludwig; James King; Walter Berry; Josef Greindl; Lisa Otto | Artur Rother; Deutsche Oper Berlin orchestra and chorus | DVD: Encore; Cat: 2009 |
| 1963 | Christa Ludwig; James King; Gustav Neidlinger; Josef Greindl; Lisa Otto | Karl Böhm; Deutsche Oper Berlin orchestra and chorus | DVD: House of Opera; Cat: DVDM 299 |
| 1969 | Anja Silja; Richard Cassilly; Theo Adam; Ernst Wiemann; Lucia Popp | Leopold Ludwig; Hamburg State Opera orchestra and chorus | DVD: ArtHaus Musik; Cat: 101 275 |
| 1970 | Gwyneth Jones; James King; Gustav Neidlinger; Josef Greindl; Olivera Miljaković | Karl Böhm; Deutsche Oper Berlin orchestra and chorus | DVD: Deutsche Grammophon; Cat: 073 4438 |
| 1977 | Gundula Janowitz; Jon Vickers; Theo Adam; William Wilderman; Stella Richmond | Zubin Mehta; Israel Philharmonic Orchestra & chorus (recorded at Chorégies d'Orange) | DVD: Better Opera; Cat: OMD 005 |
| 1978 | Gundula Janowitz; René Kollo; Hans Sotin; Manfred Jungwirth; Lucia Popp | Leonard Bernstein; Vienna State Opera orchestra and chorus | DVD: Deutsche Grammophon; Cat: 073 4159 |
| 1980 | Elisabeth Söderström; Anton De Ridder; Robert Allman; Curt Appelgren; Elizabeth Gale | Bernard Haitink; London Philharmonic Orchestra; Glyndebourne Festival chorus (recorded on 13 January) | DVD: ArtHaus Musik; Cat: 101 099 |
| 1989 | Elizabeth Connell; Thomas Moser; Siegmund Nimsgern; Hans Tschammer; Stella Kleindienst | Jeffrey Tate; Orchestre de la Suisse Romande; Grand Théâtre de Genève chorus | VHS: Lyric Distribution Incorporated; Cat: 8197 |
| 1990 | Gabriela Beňačková; Josef Protschka; Monte Pederson; Robert Lloyd; Marie McLaughlin | Christoph von Dohnányi; Royal Opera House orchestra and chorus | DVD: ArtHaus Musik; Cat: 100 075 |
| 2000 | Karita Mattila; Ben Heppner; Falk Struckmann; René Pape; Jennifer Welch | James Levine; Metropolitan Opera orchestra and chorus | DVD: Deutsche Grammophon; Cat: 073 052-9 |
| 2004 | Camilla Nylund; Jonas Kaufmann; Alfred Muff; László Polgár; Elizabeth Rae Magnuson | Nikolaus Harnoncourt; Zürich Opera orchestra and chorus (recorded on 15 February) | DVD: TDK; Cat: DV-OPFID (Europe); Cat: DVUS-OPFID (US); Blu-ray: ArtHaus Musik; Cat: 109224 |
| 2020 | Lise Davidsen; David Butt Philip; Simon Neil; Georg Zeppenfeld; Amanda Forsythe | Antonio Pappano; Royal Opera House orchestra and chorus (Stage director: Tobias Kratzer; recorded live, 13 March) | Blu-ray: Opus Arte; Cat: OABD7288D |
