= Lohengrin discography =

This is a partial discography of Lohengrin, an opera by Richard Wagner. The first production was in Weimar, Germany on 28 August 1850 at the Staatskapelle Weimar, conducted by Franz Liszt.

== Audio recordings ==
Year	Cast (Lohengrin, Elsa, Ortrud, Telramund, König Heinrich, Heerrufer)	Conductor, Opera House and Orchestra	Label
1935	Lauritz Melchior, Lotte Lehmann, Marjorie Lawrence, Friedrich Schorr, Emanuel List, Julius Huehn	Artur Bodanzky, New York Metropolitan Opera orchestra and chorus (Live recording)	Audio CD: Immortal Performances; Cat: IPCD 1032-3
1940	Lauritz Melchior, Elisabeth Rethberg, Kerstin Thorborg, Julius Huehn, Emanuel List, Leonard Warren	Erich Leinsdorf, New York Metropolitan Opera orchestra and chorus (Live recording)	Audio CD: Immortal Performances; Cat: IPCD 1018
1941	Franz Völker, Maria Müller, Margarete Klose, Jaro Prohaska, Ludwig Hofmann, Walter Großmann	Robert Heger, Staatskapelle Berlin; Chor der Staatsoper Berlin	Audio CD: Preiser; Cat: 90043
1943	Lauritz Melchior, Astrid Varnay, Kerstin Thorborg, Sándor Svéd, Norman Cordon, Mack Harrell	Erich Leinsdorf, New York Metropolitan Opera orchestra and chorus (Live recording)	Audio CD: Naxos; Cat: 8.110235
1953	Wolfgang Windgassen, Eleanor Steber, Astrid Varnay, Hermann Uhde, Josef Greindl, Hans Braun	Joseph Keilberth, Bayreuth Festival Orchestra and chorus (Live recording at Bayreuth Festival)	Audio CD: Naxos; Cat: 8.110308
1953	Rudolf Schock, Maud Cunitz, Margarete Klose, Josef Metternich, Gottlob Frick, Horst Günter	Wilhelm Schüchter, North German Radio Symphony Orchestra; Cologne West German Radio chorus North German Radio Chorus Hamburg	Audio CD: EMI Classics; Cat: 65517
1954	Wolfgang Windgassen, Birgit Nilsson, Astrid Varnay, Hermann Uhde, Theo Adam, Dietrich Fischer-Dieskau	Eugen Jochum, Bayreuth Festival Orchestra and chorus (Live recording at Bayreuth Festival)	Audio CD: Opera d'Oro; Cat: OPD 1149
1958	Sandor Konya, Leonie Rysanek, Astrid Varnay, Ernest Blanc, Kieth Engen, Eberhard Waechter	Andre Cluytens, Bayreuth Festival Orchestra and chorus (Live recording at Bayreuth Festival)	Audio CD: Walhall Eternity Series; Cat: WLCD 0250
1959	Sandor Konya, Elisabeth Grümmer, Rita Gorr, Ernest Blanc, Franz Crass, Eberhard Waechter	Lovro von Matačić, Bayreuth Festival Orchestra and chorus (Live recording at Bayreuth Festival)	Audio CD: Orfeo; Cat: C691 063 D
1959	Sandor Konya, Marcella Pobbe, Laura Didier, Aldo Protti, Paolo Dari, Enrico Campi	Ferdinand Leitner, Orch Sinfonica e Coro de Milano della RAI (Live recording on 8 September)	Audio CD: Myto; Cat: 00224 (Sung in Italian)
1962	Jess Thomas, Anja Silja, Astrid Varnay, Ramon Vinay, Franz Crass, Tom Krause	Wolfgang Sawallisch, Bayreuth Festival Orchestra and chorus (Live recording at Bayreuth Festival)	Audio CD: Decca; Cat: 470592
1963	Jess Thomas, Elisabeth Grümmer, Christa Ludwig, Dietrich Fischer-Dieskau, Gottlob Frick, Otto Wiener	Rudolf Kempe, Vienna State Opera Chorus; Vienna Philharmonic Orchestra	Audio CD: EMI Classics; Cat: 67411
1965	Jess Thomas, Claire Watson, Christa Ludwig, Walter Berry, Martti Talvela, Eberhard Waechter	Karl Böhm, Vienna State Opera orchestra and chorus (Live recording)	Audio CD: Orfeo; Cat: 862133
1966	Nicolai Gedda, Aase Nordmo Løvberg, Barbro Ericson, Rolf Jupither, Bengt Rundgren, Ingvar Wixell	Silvio Varviso, Kungel Hovkapellet, Stockholm (Live recording on 29 January)	Audio CD: Ponto Recordings; Cat: 1011
1966	Sándor Kónya, Lucine Amara, Rita Gorr, William Dooley, Jerome Hines, Calvin Marsh	Erich Leinsdorf, Boston Symphony Orchestra; Boston Chorus Pro Musica	Audio CD: RCA Red Seal; Cat: 50164
1967	James King, Heather Harper, Grace Hoffman, Donald McIntyre, Karl Ridderbusch, Thomas Tipton	Rudolf Kempe, Bayreuth Festival Orchestra and chorus (Live recording at Bayreuth Festival)	Audio CD: Orfeo; Cat: 850113
1971	James King, Gundula Janowitz, Gwyneth Jones, Thomas Stewart, Karl Ridderbusch, Gerd Nienstedt	Rafael Kubelík, Bavarian Radio Symphony orchestra and chorus	Audio CD: Deutsche Grammophon; Cat: 449591
1976-81	René Kollo, Anna Tomowa-Sintow, Dunja Vejzovic, Siegmund Nimsgern, Karl Ridderbusch, Robert Kerns	Herbert von Karajan, Berlin Philharmonic Orchestra; Berlin Deutsche Oper chorus	Audio CD: EMI Classics; Cat: CMS 5-66519-2
1982	Peter Hofmann, Karan Armstrong, Elizabeth Connell, Leif Roar, Siegfried Vogel, Bernd Weikl	Woldemar Nelsson, Bayreuth Festival Orchestra and chorus (Live recording at Bayreuth Festival)	Audio CD: CBS; Cat: 38594
1985-86	Plácido Domingo, Jessye Norman, Eva Randová, Siegmund Nimsgern, Hans Sotin, Dietrich Fischer-Dieskau	Georg Solti, Vienna Philharmonic Orchestra; Vienna State Opera chorus	Audio CD: Decca; Cat: 470795
1991	Siegfried Jerusalem, Cheryl Studer, Waltraud Meier, Hartmut Welker, Kurt Moll, Andreas Schmidt	Claudio Abbado, Vienna Philharmonic Orchestra; Vienna State Opera chorus	Audio CD: Deutsche Grammophon; Cat: 437808
1994	Ben Heppner, Sharon Sweet, Eva Marton, Sergei Leiferkus, Jan-Hendrik Rootering, Bryn Terfel	Colin Davis, Bavarian Radio Symphony Orchestra and Chorus; Bavarian State Opera chorus	Audio CD: RCA Red Seal; Cat: 62646
1998	Peter Seiffert, Emily Magee, Deborah Polaski, Falk Struckmann, René Pape, Roman Trekel	Daniel Barenboim, Berlin Staatskapelle orchestra and chorus	Audio CD: Teldec; Cat: 21484-2
2008	Johan Botha, Adrianne Pieczonka, Petra Lang, Falk Struckmann, Kwangchul Youn, Eike Wilm Schulte	Semyon Bychkov, WDR Symphony orchestra and chorus	Audio CD: Profil; Cat: 09004
2008	Klaus Florian Vogt, Anne Schwanewilms, Marianne Cornetti, Eike Wilm Schulte, Ronnie Johansen, Geert Smits	Jaap van Zweden, Netherlands Radio Philharmonic Orchestra; Netherlands Radio Choir (Live recording at the Concertgebouw, Amsterdam)	CD: Quattro Live
2017	Klaus Florian Vogt, Camilla Nylund, Katarina Dalayman, Evgeny Nikitin, Falk Struckmann, Samuel Youn	Mark Elder, Concertgebouw Orchestra; Netherlands Radio Choir; Choir Dutch National Opera (Live recording at the Concertgebouw, Amsterdam)	CD/SACD: RCO Live; Cat: RCO17002

== Video recordings ==
Year	Cast (Lohengrin, Elsa, Ortrud, Telramund, König Heinrich, Heerrufer)	Conductor, Opera House and Orchestra	Label
1982	Peter Hofmann, Karan Armstrong, Elizabeth Connell, Leif Roar, Siegfried Vogel, Bernd Weikl	Woldemar Nelsson, Bayreuth Festival Orchestra and Chorus (Staged and directed by Götz Friedrich; recorded live 25–30 June at the Bayreuth Festival)	DVD: EuroArts
1986	Peter Hofmann, Eva Marton, Leonie Rysanek , Leif Roar, John Macurdy, Anthony Raffell	James Levine, Metropolitan Opera Orchestra and Chorus (Production: August Everding; recorded live on 10 January at the Metropolitan Opera House, New York)	DVD: Deutsche Grammophon; Streaming video: Met Opera on Demand
1990	Plácido Domingo , Cheryl Studer, Dunja Vejzović, Hartmut Welker , Robert Lloyd, Georg Tichy	Claudio Abbado, Chorus and Orchestra of the Vienna State Opera (Producer: Wolfgang Weber)	DVD: Arthaus Musik
1990	Paul Frey, Cheryl Studer, Gabriele Schnaut, Ekkehard Wlaschiha, Manfred Schenk, Eike Wilm Schulte	Peter Schneider, Bayreuth Festival Orchestra and Chorus (Staged and directed by Werner Herzog; recorded live 24 June – 1 July)	DVD: Deutsche Grammophon
2006	Klaus Florian Vogt, Solveig Kringleborn, Waltraud Meier, Tom Fox, Hans-Peter König, Roman Trekel	Kent Nagano, Deutsches Symphonie-Orchester Berlin, EuropaChor Mainz, Chorus of the Opéra National de Lyon (Staged by Nikolaus Lehnhoff; recorded live on 1, 3, & 5 June at the Festspielhaus Baden-Baden)	Blu-ray: Opus Arte
2009	Jonas Kaufmann, Anja Harteros, Michaela Schuster, Wolfgang Koch, Christof Fischesser, Evgeny Nikitin	Kent Nagano, Bavarian State Opera (Stage director: Richard Jones; recorded live in July at the Nationaltheater, Munich)	Blu-ray: Decca Music Group or Deutsche Grammophon
2011	Klaus Florian Vogt, Annette Dasch, Petra Lang, Jukka Rasilainen, Georg Zeppenfeld, Samuel Youn	Andris Nelsons, Bayreuth Festival Orchestra and Chorus (Staged and directed by Hans Neuenfels)	Blu-ray: Opus Arte
2016	Piotr Beczała, Anna Netrebko, Evelyn Herlitzius, Tomasz Konieczny, Georg Zeppenfeld, Derek Welton	Christian Thielemann, Staatskapelle Dresden (Recorded live at the Semperoper, Dresden, 17-29 May)	Blu-ray/4K Ultra HD: Deutsche Grammophon; Streaming HD video: Qello
2018	Piotr Beczała, Anja Harteros, Waltraud Meier, Tomasz Konieczny, Georg Zeppenfeld, Egils Siliņš	Christian Thielemann, Bayreuth Festival Orchestra and Chorus (Directed by Yuval Sharon)	Blu-ray: Deutsche Grammophon
2020	Roberto Alagna, Vida Mikneviciuté, Ekaterina Gubanova, Martin Gantner, René Pape, Adam Kutny	Matthias Pintscher, Staatsoper Berlin (Stage director: Calixto Bieito; recorded live at the Staatsoper Berlin on 13 December)	HD video: EuroArts
2023	Piotr Beczała, Tamara Wilson, Christine Goerke, Evgeny Nikitin, Günther Groissböck, Brian Mulligan	Yannick Nézet-Séguin, Metropolitan Opera Orchestra and Chorus (Production: François Girard; recorded live on 18 March at the Metropolitan Opera House, New York)	HD video: Met Opera on Demand
2023	Piotr Beczała, Johanni van Oostrum, Ekaterina Gubanova, Wolfgang Koch, Kwangchul Youn, Shenyang	Alexander Soddy, Paris Opera Orchestra and Chorus (Production: Kirill Serebrennikov; recorded live at the Opéra Bastille)	HD video: Paris Opera Play
