= Tannhäuser discography =

This is a partial discography of the opera Tannhäuser by Richard Wagner. It was first performed in Dresden on 19 October 1845. A revised version was first given in Paris on 13 March 1861.

== List ==
Year	Cast (Tannhäuser, Elisabeth, Venus, Wolfram, Landgrave, Walther)	Conductor, Opera House and Orchestra	Label
1930	Sigismund Pilinszky, Maria Müller, Ruth Jost-Arden, Herbert Janssen, Ivar Andrésen, Geza Belti-Pilinszky	Karl Elmendorff, Bayreuth Festival Orchestra and chorus, Paris Version	Audio CD: Naxos, Cat: 8.110094-95
1941	Lauritz Melchior, Kirsten Flagstad, Kerstin Thorborg, Herbert Janssen, Emanuel List, John Dudley	Erich Leinsdorf, Metropolitan Opera orchestra and chorus, Paris Version	Audio CD: Immortal Performances, Cat: IPCD 1101-3
1942	Lauritz Melchior, Helen Traubel, Kerstin Thorborg, Herbert Janssen, Alexander Kipnis, John Garris	George Szell, Metropolitan Opera orchestra and chorus, Paris Version	Audio CD: Immortal Performances, Cat: IPCD 1053-3
1954	Ramon Vinay, Margaret Harshaw, Astrid Varnay, George London, Jerome Hines, Brian Sullivan	George Szell, Metropolitan Opera orchestra and chorus, Dresden Version	Audio CD: Sony Classical, Cat: 886443900868
1955	Wolfgang Windgassen, Gré Brouwenstijn, Herta Wilfert, Dietrich Fischer-Dieskau, Josef Greindl, Josef Traxel	André Cluytens, Bayreuth Festival Orchestra and chorus, Dresden Version (featuring Paris Bacchanale)	Audio CD: Orfeo d'Or, Cat: C 643 043 D
1960	Hans Hopf, Elisabeth Grümmer, Marianne Schech, Dietrich Fischer-Dieskau, Gottlob Frick, Fritz Wunderlich	Franz Konwitschny, Berlin State Opera orchestra and chorus, Dresden Version (reverts to Paris for small section in Act II)	Audio CD: EMI, Cat: CMS 7 63214 2
1961	Wolfgang Windgassen, Victoria de los Ángeles, Grace Bumbry, Dietrich Fischer-Dieskau, Josef Greindl, Gerhard Stolze	Wolfgang Sawallisch, Bayreuth Festival Orchestra and chorus, Dresden Version (featuring Paris Bacchanale)	Audio CD: Orfeo d'Or, Cat: C 888 143 D
1962	Wolfgang Windgassen, Anja Silja, Grace Bumbry, Eberhard Wächter, Josef Greindl, Gerhard Stolze	Wolfgang Sawallisch, Bayreuth Festival Orchestra and chorus, Dresden Version (featuring Paris Bacchanale)	Audio CD: Philips, Cat: 434 607-2
1963	Hans Beirer, Gré Brouwenstijn, Christa Ludwig, Eberhard Wächter, Gottlob Frick, Waldemar Kmentt	Herbert von Karajan, Vienna State Opera orchestra and chorus, Paris Version	Audio CD: Deutsche Grammophon, Cat: 457682
1968	Wolfgang Windgassen, Birgit Nilsson, Birgit Nilsson, Dietrich Fischer-Dieskau, Theo Adam, Horst Laubenthal	Otto Gerdes, Deutsche Oper Berlin orchestra and chorus, Dresden Version (reverts to Paris for small section in Act II)	Audio CD: Deutsche Grammophon, Cat: 471 708-2
1970	René Kollo, Helga Dernesch, Christa Ludwig, Victor Braun, Hans Sotin, Werner Hollweg	Georg Solti, Vienna Philharmonic Orchestra, Vienna State Opera chorus, Paris Version (reverts to Dresden for small section in Act II)	Audio CD: Decca, Cat: 470 810-2
1978	Spas Wenkoff, Dame Gwyneth Jones, Dame Gwyneth Jones, Bernd Weikl, Hans Sotin, Robert Schunk	Colin Davis, Bayreuth Festival Orchestra and chorus, Dresden Version (featuring Paris Bacchanale)	DVD: DG, Cat: 073 4446
1985	Klaus König, Lucia Popp, Waltraud Meier, Bernd Weikl, Kurt Moll, Siegfried Jerusalem	Bernard Haitink, Bavarian Radio Symphony Orchestra; Dresden Version	Audio CD: EMI, Cat: CMS 7 47296 8
1988	Plácido Domingo, Cheryl Studer, Agnes Baltsa, Andreas Schmidt, Matti Salminen, William Pell	Giuseppe Sinopoli, Philharmonia Orchestra, Royal Opera House chorus, Paris Version	Audio CD: Deutsche Grammophon, Cat: 427 625-2
2001	Peter Seiffert, Jane Eaglen, Waltraud Meier, Thomas Hampson, René Pape, Gunnar Gudbjörnsson	Daniel Barenboim, Berlin Staatskapelle orchestra, Berlin State Opera chorus, Dresden Version (uses Paris Version of Act I, minus ballet sequence)	Audio CD: Teldec, Cat: 8573 88064-2
2014	Peter Seiffert, Ann Petersen, Marina Prudenskaya, Peter Mattei, René Pape, Peter Sonn	Daniel Barenboim, Staatskapelle Berlin, Berlin State Opera chorus, Dresden Version (uses Paris Version of Act I, Scene I, including ballet sequence)	DVD: Bel Air Classiques, ASIN: B0168HCVM8
2010	Stig Fogh Andersen, Tina Kiberg, Susanne Resmark, Tommi Hakala, Stephen Milling, Peter Lodahl	Friedemann Layer, Royal Danish Opera, Royal Danish Orchestra and chorus,	2 DVD: DECCA, cat: 074 3390
2020	Stephen Gould, Lise Davidsen, Elena Zhidkova, Markus Eiche, Stephen Milling	Valery Gergiev, Bayreuth Festival Orchestra and chorus, Tobias Kratzer, stage director	DVD: Deutsche Grammophon, Cat:735760
