= Die Meistersinger von Nürnberg discography =

This is a list of audio and video recordings (discography) of Richard Wagner's opera Die Meistersinger von Nürnberg which received its premiere at the Königliches Hof- und National-Theater in Munich, on June 21, 1868.

== Audio recordings ==
Year	Cast (Sachs, Walther, Beckmesser, David, Eva, Magdalena, Pogner)	Conductor, Opera house and orchestra	Label
1928	Friedrich Schorr, Robert Hutt, Leo Schützendorf, Karl Jöken, Elfriede Marherr-Wagner, Lydia Kindermann, Emanuel List	Leo Blech, Berliner Staatsoper (Recording of part of a performance at the Staatsoper Berlin, 22 May)	Pearl/Symposium
1936	Hans-Herrmann Nissen, Charles Kullman, Hermann Wiedemann, Richard Sallaba, Lotte Lehmann, Kerstin Thorborg, Herbert Alsen	Arturo Toscanini, Vienna Philharmonic Orchestra and Chorus (Recorded at the Salzburg Festival)	LP: UORC (act 1 only); CD: Eklipse (part of act 3 only)
1936	Friedrich Schorr, René Maison, Eduard Habich, Hans Clemens, Elisabeth Rethberg, Karin Branzell, Emanuel List	Artur Bodanzky, Metropolitan Opera Orchestra and Chorus (Recording of a performance at the Met, 22 February)	Music and Arts/Guild Immortal Performances
1937	Hans-Herrmann Nissen, Henk Noort, Hermann Wiedemann, Richard Sallaba, Maria Reining, Kerstin Thorborg, Herbert Alsen	Arturo Toscanini, Vienna Philharmonic Orchestra and Chorus (Recorded at the Salzburg Festival)	Eklipse/Grammofono/Andante
1943	Jaro Prohaska, Max Lorenz, Eugen Fuchs, Erich Zimmermann, Maria Müller, Camilla Kallab, Josef Greindl	Wilhelm Furtwängler, Bayreuth Festival Orchestra and Chorus (Recording of a performance at the Bayreuth Festival)	EMI
1943	Paul Schöffler, Ludwig Suthaus, Erich Kunz, Erich Witte, Hilde Scheppan, Camilla Kallab, Frederick Dalberg	Hermann Abendroth, Bayreuth Festival Orchestra (Recording of a performance at the Bayreuth Festival, 16 July)	Preiser
1944	Paul Schöffler, August Seider, Erich Kunz, Peter Klein, Irmgard Seefried, Else Schürhoff, Herbert Alsen	Karl Böhm, Vienna Philharmonic (Excerpts of concert performances, Musikverein, 28 November and 4 December)	Arkadia/Preiser/Cantus
1949	Hans Hotter, Günther Treptow, Benno Kusche, Paul Kuën, Annelies Kupper, Ruth Michaelis, Max Proebstl	Eugen Jochum, Bayerische Staatsoper, Munich	Myto / Walhall
1950/51	Paul Schöffler, Günther Treptow, Karl Dönch, Anton Dermota, Hilde Gueden, Else Schürhoff, Otto Edelmann	Hans Knappertsbusch, Vienna Philharmonic Orchestra and Chorus	Decca
1951	Otto Edelmann, Hans Hopf, Erich Kunz, Gerhard Unger, Elisabeth Schwarzkopf, Ira Malaniuk, Gottlob Frick	Herbert von Karajan, Bayreuth Festival Orchestra and Chorus	EMI
1951	Ferdinand Frantz, Bernd Aldenhoff, Heinrich Pflanzl, Gerhard Unger, Tiana Lemnitz, Emilie Walter-Sacks, Kurt Böhme	Rudolf Kempe, Dresden State Opera Chorus and Saxon State Orchestra	Urania/Vox
1955	Otto Edelmann, Hans Hopf, Erich Kunz, Gerhard Unger, Elisabeth Schwarzkopf, Ira Malaniuk, Ludwig Weber	Hans Rosbaud, Orchestra Sinfonica e coro della RAI di Milano	Walhall Eternity Series
1956	Ferdinand Frantz, Rudolf Schock, Benno Kusche, Gerhard Unger, Elisabeth Grümmer, Marga Höffgen, Gottlob Frick	Rudolf Kempe, Berlin Philharmonic Orchestra	Electrola/His Master's Voice/Angel/EMI
1956	Hans Hotter, Wolfgang Windgassen, Karl Schmitt-Walter, Gerhard Stolze, Gre Brouwenstijn, Georgine von Milinkovič, Josef Greindl	André Cluytens, Bayreuth Festival Orchestra and Chorus	Golden Melodram
1957	Gustav Neidlinger, Walter Geisler, Karl Schmitt-Walter, Gerhard Stolze, Elisabeth Grümmer, Georgine von Milinkovič, Josef Greindl	André Cluytens, Bayreuth Festival Orchestra and Chorus	Melodram/Walhall
1960	Josef Greindl, Wolfgang Windgassen, Karl Schmitt-Walter, Gerhard Stolze, Elisabeth Grümmer, Elisabeth Schärtel, Theo Adam	Hans Knappertsbusch, Bayreuth Festival Orchestra and Chorus	Melodram/Myto/Orfeo
1962	Giuseppe Taddei, Luigi Infantino, Renato Capecchi, Carlo Franzini, Bruna Rizzoli, Fernanda Cadoni, Boris Christoff	Lovro von Matačić, Orchestra Sinfonica e Coro di Torino della RAI (Sung in Italian with some cuts)	Datum
1964	Otto Wiener, Jess Thomas, Benno Kusche, Friedrich Lenz, Claire Watson, Lilian Benningsen, Hans Hotter	Joseph Keilberth, Bavarian State Opera Orchestra and Chorus	BMG
1967	Thomas Stewart, Sándor Kónya, Thomas Hemsley, Gerhard Unger, Gundula Janowitz, Brigitte Fassbaender, Franz Crass	Rafael Kubelík, Bavarian Radio Symphony Orchestra and Chorus	Arts Music / Calig / Myto
1968	Theo Adam, Waldemar Kmentt, Thomas Hemsley, Hermin Esser, Gwyneth Jones, Janis Martin; Karl Ridderbusch	Karl Böhm, Bayreuth Festival Orchestra and Chorus	Orfeo
1968	Norman Bailey, Alberto Remedios, Derek Hammond-Stroud, Gregory Dempsey, Margaret Curphey, Ann Robson, Noel Mangin	Reginald Goodall, Sadler's Wells Opera Orchestra & Chorus (Sung in English)	Chandos
1970	Theo Adam, René Kollo, Geraint Evans, Peter Schreier, Helen Donath, Ruth Hesse, Karl Ridderbusch	Herbert von Karajan, Staatskapelle Dresden, Dresdner Operchor, Leipziger Rundfunkchor (Studio recording)	EMI
1974	Karl Ridderbusch, Jean Cox, Klaus Hirte, Frieder Stricker, Hannelore Bode, Anna Reynolds, Hans Sotin	Silvio Varviso, Bayreuth Festival Orchestra and Chorus (Recorded live)	Phillips
1975	Norman Bailey, René Kollo, Bernd Weikl, Adolf Dallapozza, Hannelore Bode, Julia Hamari, Kurt Moll	Georg Solti, Vienna Philharmonic and Chorus of the Vienna State Opera (Studio recording)	Decca/London
1976	Dietrich Fischer-Dieskau, Plácido Domingo, Roland Hermann, Horst Laubenthal, Catarina Ligendza, Christa Ludwig, Peter Lagger	Eugen Jochum, Chorus and Orchestra of the German Opera, Berlin (Studio recording)	Deutsche Grammophon
1993	Bernd Weikl, Ben Heppner, Siegfried Lorenz, Deon van der Walt, Cheryl Studer, Cornelia Kallisch, Kurt Moll	Wolfgang Sawallisch, Munich Staatsorchester (Studio recording)	EMI
1995	José van Dam, Ben Heppner, Alan Opie, Herbert Lippert, Karita Mattila, Iris Vermillon, René Pape	Georg Solti, Chicago Symphony Orchestra (Recorded at concert performances, 23 & 27 September)	Decca/London
1997	John Tomlinson, Gösta Winbergh, Thomas Allen, Herbert Lippert, Nancy Gustafson, Catherine Wyn-Rogers, Gwynne Howell	Bernard Haitink, Chorus and Orchestra of the Royal Opera House (Recorded live, 7 July, Royal Opera House)	Royal Opera House "Heritage Series"

== Video recordings ==
Year	Cast (Sachs, Walther, Beckmesser, David, Eva, Magdalena, Pogner)	Conductor, Opera house and orchestra (Production details)	Label
1999	Robert Holl, Peter Seiffert, Andreas Schmidt, Endrik Wottrich, Emily Magee, Birgitta Svendén, Matthias Hölle	Daniel Barenboim, Bayreuth Festival Orchestra and Chorus	CD: Teldec; DVD: EuroArts
2001	James Morris, Ben Heppner, Thomas Allen, Matthew Polenzani, Karita Mattila, Jill Grove, René Pape	James Levine, Metropolitan Opera (Production: Otto Schenk; set design: Günther Schneider-Siemssen; recorded live, 8 December)	DVD: Deutsche Grammophon; SD video: Met Opera on Demand
2008	Franz Hawlata, Klaus Florian Vogt, Michael Volle, Norbert Ernst, Michaela Kaune, Carola Guber, Artur Korn	Sebastian Weigle, Bayreuth Festival Orchestra & Chorus	DVD: Opus Arte
2014	Michael Volle, Johan Botha, Johannes Martin Kränzle, Paul Appleby, Annette Dasch, Karen Cargill, Hans-Peter König	James Levine, Metropolitan Opera (Production: Otto Schenk; set design: Günther Schneider-Siemssen; recorded live, 13 December)	HD video: Met Opera on Demand
