= Rysanek =

Rysanek is a surname. Notable people with the surname include:

- Leonie Rysanek (1926–1998), Austrian dramatic soprano
- Lotte Rysanek (1924–2016), Austrian operatic soprano, sister of Leonie
