= Ingrid Haubold =

German opera singer (born 1943)

- Born: 1943 (age 81–82); Berlin, Germany
- Education: Musikhochschule Detmold; Musikhochschule München
- Occupations: Operatic soprano; Academic teacher
- Organizations: Bavarian State Opera; Städtische Bühnen Bielefeld; Lübeck Opera; University of Music Karlsruhe

Ingrid Haubold (born 1943) is a German operatic soprano. After beginning her career in Munich and continuing with German companies, she moved on to major international opera houses, appearing as Isolde in Wagner's Tristan und Isolde at the Teatro Real in Madrid in 1986, as Senta in Der fliegende Holländer at the Savonlinna Opera Festival, and in the title role of Beethoven's Fidelio at the Metropolitan Opera in New York City.

== Life and career ==
Born in Berlin, Haubold first studied church music at the Musikhochschule Detmold. She then studied voice with Annelies Kupper at the Musikhochschule München. She was a scholarship holder of the Deutscher Bühnenverein. She became a member of the opera studio of the Bavarian State Opera, and also appeared at the Theater am Gärtnerplatz in the 1965/66 season. She was a member of the ensemble of the Landestheater Detmold from 1970, and of the Städtische Bühnen Bielefeld from 1972. After a break due to illness in 1978, she continued her career as a member of the Lübeck Opera in 1979, and had guest contracts with the Staatsoper Hannover and the Badisches Staatstheater Karlsruhe from 1981.

Haubold performed on leading international stages beginning in 1986. She appeared as Isolde in Wagner's Tristan und Isolde at the Teatro Real in Madrid that year, and appeared at the Bayreuth Festival as Ortlinde in Die Walküre in 1986 and 1988. She was Isolde again at the Deutsche Oper Berlin in 1988, performed at the Teatro Regio the same year. In 1989, she appeared in the title role of Ariadne auf Naxos by Richard Strauss at the Schwetzingen Festival, and at the Lucerne Festival. In 1990, she was a guest at the Metropolitan Opera in New York City in the title role of Beethoven's Fidelio. The same year, she performed as Brünnhilde in Wagner's Der Ring des Nibelungen at the Theater Saarbrücken, and as Senta in Der fliegende Holländer at the Savonlinna Opera Festival. She appeared at the Vienna State Opera in the 1990s, including as Isolde and as the Empress in Die Frau ohne Schatten by Richard Strauss. She performed the role of Rezia in Weber's Oberon at the Theater St. Gallen in 1993, was Brünnhilde in Siegfried at the Wiesbaden May Festival in 1996, and performed the title role of Elektra by Richard Strauss at the Ulm Opera in 1998. She appeared at the Teatro Massimo in Palermo, the Teatro Comunale Bologna, and the Antwerp Opera, among others, and at festivals such as the Richard Wagner Festival in Wels.

In concert, she sang recitals including contemporary music. She was a soloist in the 1990 premiere of Wolfgang Rihm's Requiem for soprano and orchestra, Mein Tod. Requiem in memoriam Jane S., at the Salzburg Festival, with Michael Gielen conducting the ORF Radio-Symphonieorchester Wien.

Haubold recorded scenes from the first act of Die Walküre with René Kollo as Siegmund, conducted by Christian Thielemann in 1992. In 1993, she recorded Senta in Der fliegende Holländer with Alfred Muff in the title role, conducted by Pinchas Steinberg. Alan Blyth wrote for Gramophone that she was a "discovery":

Here is a lyric-dramatic soprano who has just the steadiness and strength to encompass Senta's music and, as important, the histrionic power to convey most of the girl's obsession. As with the rest of the performance there is refreshing directness to her reading quite free of artifice or prima-donna pretensions, and she rises with only an occasional sense of not entirely inappropriate strain to the climaxes of the love duet and to the final moments of the opera as a whole. Her voice has a certain raw edge to it that may put off some but seems apt in this part.

Haubold has been professor for singing at the University of Music Karlsruhe. Among her students was the bass Doğuş Güney who studied with her from 2013 to 2015. She was married to the Finnish bass Heikki Toivanen until his death in 2006.

== Roles ==
Haubold's roles include:

- Pamina in Mozart's Die Zauberflöte
- Leonore in Beethoven's Fidelio
- Marie in Smetana's Die verkaufte Braut
- Wagner roles
  - Senta in Der fliegende Holländer
  - Elisabeth in Tannhäuser
  - Elsa in Lohengrin
  - Eva in Die Meistersinger von Nürnberg
  - Freia, Sieglinde, Gutrune and Brünnhilde in Der Ring des Nibelungen
  - Isolde in Tristan und Isolde
  - Irene in Rienzi
  - Ada in Die Feen
- Richard Strauss roles
  - Chrysothemis in Elektra
  - title role in Ariadne auf Naxos
  - the Marschallin in Der Rosenkavalier
- title roles in Janáček's Jenůfa and Káťa Kabanová
