= Sieglinde Wagner =

Austrian opera singer

- Born: 21 April 1921; Linz, Austria
- Died: 31 December 2003 (aged 82); Berlin
- Occupation: Operatic contralto

Sieglinde Wagner (21 April 1921 – 31 December 2003) was an Austrian operatic contralto, who also sang mezzo-soprano roles.

Wagner was born in Linz, and studied in Linz and Munich. In 1947, she made her debut at the Vienna State Opera. Two years later, she was hired by Wilhelm Furtwängler to sing in The Magic Flute at the Salzburg Festival. After this successful collaboration, Furtwängler signed her to sing Floßhilde and Grimgerde in Richard Wagner's Der Ring des Nibelungen at La Scala. This was the beginning of a career that included many of Wagner's contralto roles (she and the composer were not related).

In 1950, Wagner sang as a contralto, as Prince Orlovsky in Die Fledermaus.

In 1952, she made her first appearance at the Städtische Oper Berlin as Maddalena in Rigoletto. She sang Carmen there in December of the same year. She would sing at the Berlin Opera for the next 34 years.

Sieglinde Wagner had a very wide repertoire, including Clairon in Richard Strauss's Capriccio, Annina in Der Rosenkavalier, Magdalena in Die Meistersinger von Nürnberg, Fenena in Nabucco, the mother in Hansel and Gretel and Mary in The Flying Dutchman.

In 1963, she was awarded the title of Kammersänger by the senate of Berlin. She was active for many years at the festivals in Bayreuth, Edinburgh, Glyndebourne, and Salzburg under conductors such as Otto Klemperer, Wilhelm Furtwängler, Clemens Krauss, Fritz Busch, Karl Böhm, Herbert von Karajan, Wolfgang Sawallisch and Rudolf Kempe.

She made numerous recordings with casts, including The Magic Flute with Karl Böhm, Fritz Wunderlich, Roberta Peters, and Dietrich Fischer-Dieskau.

She retired from singing in 1986. She died in a Berlin hospital in 2003, at the age of 82.
