= Hildegard Behrens =

German operatic soprano (1937–2009)

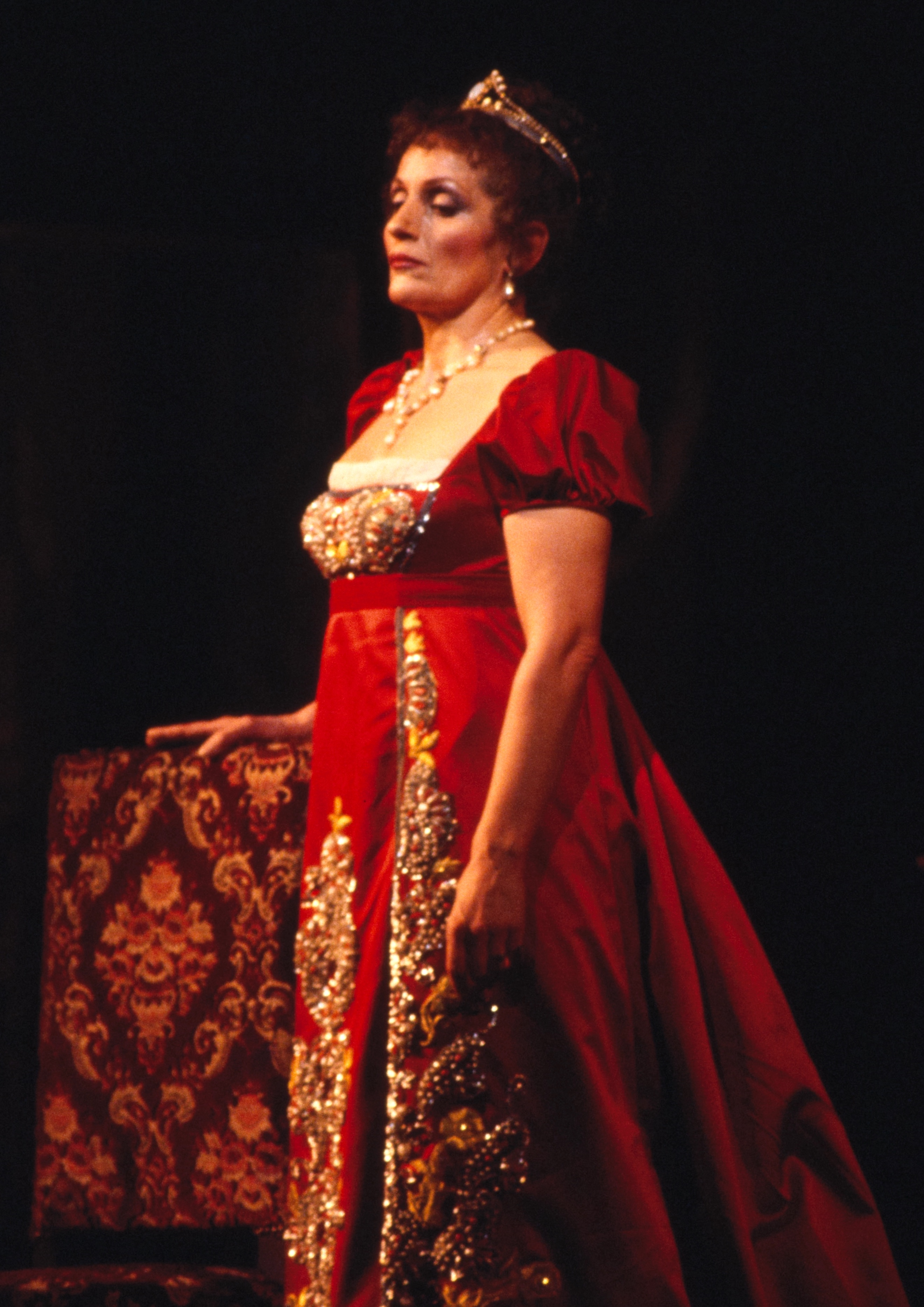
- Behrens as Tosca at the Metropolitan Opera, 1985
- Born: 9 February 1937; Varel, Germany
- Died: 18 August 2009 (aged 72); Tokyo, Japan
- Education: University of Freiburg
- Occupation: Operatic soprano
- Organizations: Deutsche Oper am Rhein; Metropolitan Opera
- Title: Kammersängerin
- Awards: Order of Merit of the Federal Republic of Germany; Leonie Sonning Music Prize; Grammy Awards

Hildegard Behrens (9 February 1937 – 18 August 2009) was a German operatic soprano with a wide repertoire including Wagner, Weber, Mozart, Richard Strauss, and Alban Berg roles. She performed at major opera houses around the world, and received several Grammy Awards for performances with the Metropolitan Opera.

== Life and career ==
Behrens was born in Varel in 1937. She graduated from the University of Freiburg as a junior barrister before becoming serious about her talents as a singer, studying at first with Ines Leuwen at the Freiburg Academy Of Music. Her stage debut was as the Countess in Mozart's Le nozze di Figaro in Freiburg in 1971. In 1973, she joined the Deutsche Oper am Rhein in Düsseldorf. In the 1975–76 season, while rehearsing for Alban Berg's Wozzeck, she was "discovered" by Herbert von Karajan, who was then looking for a new Salome. She was summoned to Berlin to audition for the role. Karajan liked what he heard and invited her to portray the role at the 1977 Salzburg Festival.

In 1990, she sang the role of Brünnhilde in the PBS broadcast of the Metropolitan Opera's performances of Der Ring des Nibelungen.

Hildegard Behrens died of a sudden aortic aneurysm, aged 72, in hospital in Tokyo, Japan, where she had been attending the Kusatsu International Summer Music Festival.

== Awards ==
Behrens was the recipient of many awards, including the Order of Merit of the Federal Republic of Germany, and the Bavarian Order of Merit. The title of Kammersängerin was bestowed by both the Bavarian State Opera and the Vienna State Opera. In 1998, she received Denmark's prestigious Leonie Sonning Music Prize, and in 1999 the Vienna State Opera honoured her with the Lotte Lehmann Ring, bequeathed to her by Leonie Rysanek.

She received several Grammy Awards, including:

- 1989 Grammy Award for Best Opera Recording: Wagner's Die Walküre, with the Metropolitan Opera Orchestra
- 1991 Grammy Award for Best Opera Recording: Wagner's Götterdämmerung, with the Metropolitan Opera Orchestra
- 1992 Grammy Award for Best Opera Recording: Richard Strauss' Die Frau ohne Schatten, with the Metropolitan Opera Orchestra

== Performances on video ==
Available on DVD:

- Der Ring des Nibelungen, with James Levine conducting the Metropolitan Opera Orchestra, in the "classical-manner" production by Otto Schenk, from 1989 to 1990; Deutsche Grammophon 073 049-9
- Tosca, with Giuseppe Sinopoli conducting the Metropolitan Opera in the celebrated Franco Zeffirelli production from 1985, also starring Plácido Domingo; Deutsche Grammophon 073 410-1
- Idomeneo, performed at the Met with Luciano Pavarotti, production designer Jean-Pierre Ponnelle, conductor James Levine; Deutsche GrammophonASIN B000E5KOJI
- Elektra, from the Met, January 1994, with Brigitte Fassbaender, James King, Donald McIntyre, conducted by James Levine; ASIN B0064SBBA0
- Wozzeck, from the Vienna State Opera, 1987, with Franz Grundheber, Aage Haugland, Heinz Zednik, Philip Langridge, conducted by Claudio Abbado; ASIN B00005M206
