= Res Fischer =

German opera singer

- Born: Maria Theresa Fischer; 8 November 1896; Berlin
- Died: 4 October 1974 (aged 77); Esslingen am Neckar
- Occupation: Operatic contralto

Res Fischer (8 November 1896 – 4 October 1974) was one of the few true German contraltos of the 1930s and 1940s, and was one of the most powerful singing-actresses of her day, performing internationally. She appeared in first recordings of complete operas, and created roles including the title role of Carl Orff's Antigonae.

== Career ==
Born Maria Theresa Fischer in Berlin, she studied in Berlin with Lilli Lehmann, in Stuttgart and Prague. She made her stage debut in 1927 at the Theater Basel, and remained there until 1935. She then sang at the Oper Frankfurt to 1941, when she joined the Stuttgart Opera.

After the war, she began appearing at the Bavarian State Opera, the Vienna State Opera, at La Scala in Milan, at La Monnaie in Brussels, the Royal Opera House in London, San Carlo in Naples, and in 1951 at the Teatro Colón in Buenos Aires.

Her repertory included: Gluck's Orfeo ed Euridice, Verdi roles such as Azucena in Il trovatore, Amneris in Aida, Eboli in Don Carlo, and Mrs. Quickly in Falstaff, Wagner roles including Ortrud in ohengrin, Fricka in Die Walküre, and Brangäne in Tristan und Isolde, Strauss roles such as the Nurse in Die Frau ohne Schatten, Herodias in Salome, and Klytemnestra in Elektra, the Old Countess in Tchaikovsky's The Queen of Spades, the Kostelnicka in Janáček's Jenůfa, and Iocasta in Stravinsky's Oedipus Rex. She created the title role in Carl Orff's Antigonae at the Salzburg Festival in 1949.

Fischer appeared at the Bayreuth Festival from 1959 to 1961 as Mary in Der fliegende Holländer. She performed there in a production conducted by Wolfgang Sawallisch, alongside George London as the Holländer and Leonie Rysanek as Senta. She enjoyed a long and distinguished career singing until 1961.

Fischer died in Ruit auf den Fildern near Esslingen.

== Recordings ==
Fischer is featured in recordings of complete operas in German, including first recordings, in 1949 of Orff's Antigonae conducted by Ferenc Fricsay, in 1950 of Marschner's Hans Heiling conducted by Wilhelm Schüchter, and in 1964 of Fortner's Bluthochzeit conducted by Ferdinand Leitner. She sang the role of Marcellina in Mozart's Die Hochzeit des Figaro in a 1942 recording conducted by Clemens Krauss, and the female title role of Samson et Dalila in 1948, alongside Lorenz Fehenberger, Fred Destal and Max Proebstl, with Hans Altmann conducting the Bavarian Radio Chorus and Orchestra. She appeared as Zita in Puccini's Gianni Schicchi in 1949, conducted by Richard Kraus, as Ulrica in Verdi's Un ballo in maschera in 1950, conducted by Georg Solti, as Mary in 1951, conducted by Schüchter, and again in 1959 in the Bayreuth recording, as Erda in Wagner's Das Rheingold a live recording from Hamburg conducted by Schüchter, and as the Knusperhexe in Humperdinck's Hänsel und Gretel in 1954, conducted by Fritz Lehmann.

== Sources ==
- Operissimo.com
