= Lotte Rysanek =

Austrian operatic soprano

Lotte Rysanek (18 March 1924 – 14 December 2016) was an Austrian operatic soprano. She was the sister of soprano Leonie Rysanek.

== Life ==
Born in Vienna, Rysanek was taught by Rudolf Grossmann at the Konservatorium Wien. In 1950, she made her debut as Manon in Klagenfurt in Jules Massenet's eponymous opera. From 1955 to 1987, she sang at the Wiener Staatsoper. She was also known as an operetta and concert singer. She appeared at the Bayreuth Festival as the fifth flower girl in Parsifal in 1957 and at her sister's side in 1958 as Helmwige in Die Walküre.

Since her marriage to Herbert Dörler (1959), she has had the double name Rysanek-Dörler.

Rysanek died in Vienna at the age of 92. She was buried at the Hietzing Cemetery (group 68, row 7, number 7) in an Ehrengrab.

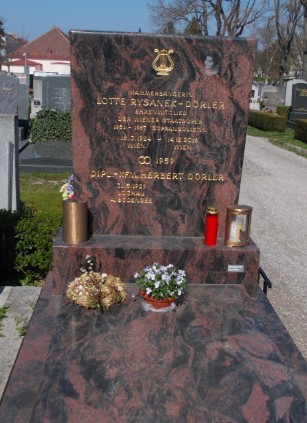
Lotte Rysanek's grave

== Awards ==
- Bestowal of the professional title Kammersängerin
- 1987: Honorary member of the Vienna State Opera
