= Franz-Josef Selig =

German operatic bass (born 1962)

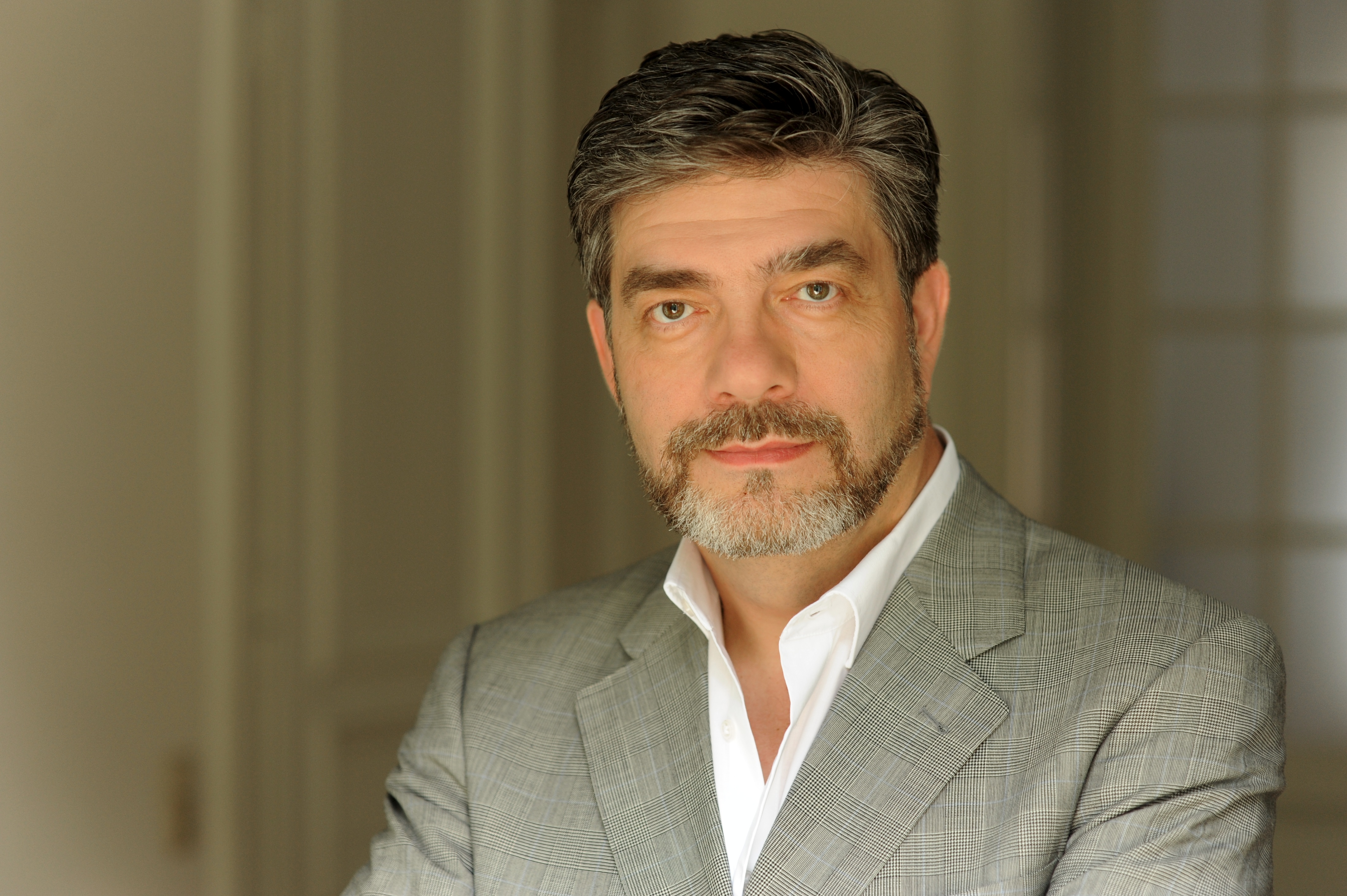
- Selig in 2013
- Born: 11 July 1962 (age 62); Mayen, Rhineland-Palatinate, West Germany
- Education: Musikhochschule Köln
- Occupation: Operatic bass
- Organizations: Aalto-Theater

Franz-Josef Selig (born 11 July 1962) is a German operatic bass.

== Career ==
Born in Mayen, Selig studied at the Musikhochschule Köln, first church music, later voice. During his studies already, he was accepted in 1989 as a member of the Aalto-Theater, the opera of Essen, where he stayed until 1995. He performed as a guest at notable opera houses in Germany, Europe and the US, such as the Vienna State Opera, the Royal Opera House in London, La Scala, the Hamburg State Opera, both Opéra Bastille and Théâtre du Châtelet in Paris, the Metropolitan Opera, La Monnaie in Brussels, Deutsche Oper Berlin, Bavarian State Opera, Frankfurt Opera and the Opéra National de Lyon. He focused on roles by Richard Wagner such as Marke in Tristan und Isolde and Gurnemanz in Parsifal. His roles have also included Sarastro in Mozart's Die Zauberflöte, Osmin in his Die Entführung aus dem Serail, Rocco in Beethoven's Fidelio, and Fiesco in Verdi's Simon Boccanegra.

Selig made his debut at the Bayreuth Festival in 2012 as Daland in Der fliegende Holländer. In 2013, he added there the role of Hunding in Die Walküre. In the 2013/14 season, he first performed in Handel's Agrippina, and in Toulouse in Daphne by Richard Strauss. He has also performed recitals of Lieder.

For television, Selig sang the Bruckner Te Deum in 2007 with the WDR Symphony Orchestra Cologne, WDR Rundfunkchor Köln, NDR Chor, under the direction of Gilbert Levine. Selig has recorded commercially for such labels as PENTATONE, Deutsche Grammophon, and LSO Live.

== Awards ==
- 1992: Aalto-Bühnenpreis für junge Künstler
- 2012: Kulturpreis der Stadt Neuwied
- 2013: Honorary member of the Koblenz Richard-Wagner-Verband
