= Stanislas de Barbeyrac =

French operatic tenor

Stanislas de Barbeyrac (born 27 April 1984) is a French operatic tenor.

== Biography ==
Stanislas de Barbeyrac was born in Annecy (Haute Savoie) on 27 April 1984. His mother's family was Polish and working class. His paternal grandfather arrived in Normandy as a member of the Polish forces that fought alongside Allied forces after the fall of Poland in World War II. His father's family had its roots in the traditional and conservative French aristocracy. He received a Catholic education and religion remains important for him. He was the youngest of four children. His family moved to Bordeaux when he was eight.

From age eight to seventeen he sang with the Petits Chanteurs de Bordeaux, a youth choir devoted to church music. He later said he considered his participation in this choral school a hobby (French: loisir) on a par with rugby. It did not include any formal musical instruction.

At the age of 19, he was planning to pursue higher education that would lead to a career in journalism. He had stopped singing when his voice broke and missed it. He decided to explore formal music education, was accepted at the Bordeaux Conservatoire. In 2004, in his first class with Lionel Sarrazin, himself a new teacher, de Barbeyrac was thunderstruck to discover a repertoire and range of possibilities that immediately convinced him that he would become a singer. He later explained: "My first class was a revelation for me. The world of lyric was unknown to me.... I happily discovered the sounds I could make, the theater, the use of the body. Without being shy, I was a little inhibited: it transformed me. I quickly understood that this was what I had to do. So I threw myself headlong into this learning process." He credits Sarrazin with introducing him to the world of secular music and stunning him with the possibility of a life in music: "He made me sing when I had no concept, no culture and it was a real love at first sight for lyrical music." De Barbeyrac continues to rely on him: "I always see him to check the mechanics and ask him the questions that bother me. He gives me advice when I present my roles to him, I consult him because he knows me, knows my faults and knows exactly what suits me. I still need him because I am in the middle of construction and I know that we will have to make choices. An objective ear like his is essential to me, because I know that he will never try to make me take any risks, which explains my total confidence in him."

In 2008 he joined the Atelier Lyrique at the Paris Opera, its training institute for young singers. He speaks of his experience in that program with enthusiasm: "I feel like a sort of spokesperson, proud to say that I come from a house that trained me and to which I owe a lot." He has credited his two years there for providing him with an intensive training and practical experience in many small roles that proved critical to launching his career. He has noted this led to particularly interesting roles, significant characters suited to his voiced and dramatically interesting, such as Narraboth in Salome and Walther in Tannhäuser.

In November 2014, he made his debut with The Royal Opera as Arbace in Idomeneo. Reviews of the production were negative but singled out de Barbeyrac: "The best performance ... comes from Stanislas de Barbeyrac as Arbace, singing his aria with sustained beauty of tone, and bringing real presence whenever he comes on stage.

He has received consistently high praise for his work in Paris, for example as Lyonnel in Chausson's Le roi Arthus in May 2015. Le Point later wrote that his opening in the Chausson made the audience forget the starring singers (Thomas Hampson and Roberto Alagna) who were yet to appear: "In five minutes of quietly sighing chivalrous ideals, Stanislas de Barbeyrac established himself in the big leagues. He obviously had what we notice and will no longer forget, a timbre, a well-spoken manner, a color of sensitivity which comes immediately into the voice, a personality."

In 2017, he made his US debut with the San Francisco Opera as Don Ottavio in Don Giovanni, a role he reprised in his Metropolitan Opera debut in 2019.

== Awards ==
- 2008, First Prize in Opera, Concours de Chant de Béziers
- 2008, First Prize in Opera and in Men's Voice, and the Prize of the Public at the Concours International de Marmande
- 2010, the Prix Lyrique du Cercle Carpeaux
- 2010, Prix Lyrique of the Association pour le Rayonnement de l'Opéra de Paris (AROP)
- 2011, Queen Elizabeth International Competition (Brussels)
- 2014, Opera Singer Revelation, Victoires de la musique classique, administered by the French Ministry of Culture

== Personal life ==
He lives in Barsac (Gironde) with his wife, Delphine, a school teacher, and their three children.
