= Astrid Varnay =

American operatic soprano (1918–2006)

Ibolyka Astrid Maria Varnay (25 April 1918 – 4 September 2006) was a Swedish-born American dramatic soprano of Hungarian descent. She spent most of her career in the United States and Germany. She was one of the leading Wagnerian heroic sopranos of her generation.

== Background ==
Both her parents were Hungarian and born in small towns in the Austro-Hungarian Empire, but she was born in Stockholm, where her parents were living during part of World War I. During a Da Capo interview in 1988 Varnay claimed that although she was born in Stockholm, her ancestry was Hungarian, French and German. Her mother, Maria Junghans (who changed her name to Javor when she took to the stage as a singer), born October 15, 1889, was a noted coloratura soprano with acoustic recordings to her credit. Her father was Alexander Varnay (born September 11, 1889), a spinto tenor. Opera was the family business, and Varnay grew up backstage at the world's opera houses. Her father founded, and both parents ran, the Opera Comique in Kristiania (later Oslo), (1918–1921). During one performance, she was swaddled in the lower drawer of the dressing room chest of drawers of the young Kirsten Flagstad.

The family moved to Argentina, then New York City, where her father died at age 35 in 1924. Two years later her mother married tenor Fortunato de Angelis and the family settled in New Jersey. Varnay had been studying to be a pianist but decided at age eighteen to become a singer and had intensive vocal lessons with her mother.

== Career ==
A year later, Flagstad arranged for her to start preparing roles with Metropolitan Opera staff conductor and coach Hermann Weigert (1890–1955). By the age of 22 she knew Hungarian, German, English, French and Italian and her repertoire consisted of fifteen leading dramatic soprano roles, eleven of which were Wagnerian parts. She also had formidable mezzo-soprano capability, which she displayed in performances as Ortrud in Lohengrin and Klytemnestra in Elektra.

She made her sensational debut at the Metropolitan Opera on 6 December 1941 in a broadcast performance singing Sieglinde in Wagner's Die Walküre, substituting for the indisposed Lotte Lehmann with almost no rehearsal. This was her first appearance in a leading role, and it was a triumph. Six days later she replaced the ailing Helen Traubel as Brünnhilde in the same opera. Varnay and Weigert became closer and were married in 1944. It was also at this time that she had lessons with former Metropolitan Opera tenor, Paul Althouse.

In 1948, she made her debut at Covent Garden and in 1951 in Florence as Lady Macbeth. In that year she also made her debut at Bayreuth after Flagstad, who had declined the invitation to Bayreuth, recommended that Wieland Wagner engage Varnay. She sang at Bayreuth for the next seventeen years, and appeared regularly at the Metropolitan until 1956.

She left when it was clear that the Met director Rudolf Bing did not appreciate her, and went on to become a mainstay of the world's other great opera houses, especially in Germany, in Wagner and Strauss but also several Verdi and other roles. She had already made Munich her home, where audiences liked her.

In 1969, she gave up her repertoire of heavy dramatic soprano roles and began a new career singing mezzo roles. After being the world's leading Elektra for over twenty years, she now established herself as a great interpreter of Klytemnestra. The role of Herodias in Salome became her most often-performed role: 236 performances. She returned to the Metropolitan in 1974 and last appeared there in Weill's Rise and Fall of the City of Mahagonny in 1979. In 1975 she appeared as Herodias in the production of Salome with Teresa Stratas which was filmed with the Vienna Philharmonic and directed by Gotz Friedrich.

In the mid-1980s, character roles now became Varnay's metier. Her last appearance on stage was in Munich in 1995, fifty-five years after her Metropolitan debut. In 1998, she published her autobiography Fifty-Five Years in Five Acts: My Life in Opera, written with Donald Arthur (German title is Hab' mir's gelobt).

In 2004, a documentary about her life and first New York career entitled Never Before received acclaim in the USA. Her recordings of Strauss heroines such as Elektra and Salome along with the Wagnerian roles are among the treasures of the medium, while transcriptions of broadcast performances of her great roles document her art in sound, and a few video recordings of her late career preserve evidence of her acting ability. Varnay died in Munich on 4 September 2006 at age 88.

== Recordings ==
Wagner: Der fliegende Holländer – Chorus and Orchestra of the Bayreuth Festival

- Conductor: Joseph Keilberth
- Principal singers: Hermann Uhde (Dutchman); Astrid Varnay (Senta); Ludwig Weber (Daland); Rudolf Lustig (Erik); Josef Traxel (Helmsman); Elisabeth Schärtel (Mary)
- Recording location & date: Bayreuth Festspielhaus, 7, 15, & 19 August 1955 (stereo)
- Label: Testament SBT2 1384 (2 CDs)

Wagner: Lohengrin – Chorus and Orchestra of the Bayreuth Festival

- Conductor: Eugen Jochum
- Principal singers: Wolfgang Windgassen (Title role); Birgit Nilsson (Elsa); Astrid Varnay (Ortrud); Theo Adam (Konig Heinrich); Hermann Uhde (Telramund); Dietrich Fischer-Dieskau (Heerrufer)
- Recording location & date: Bayreuth Festspielhaus, 1954
- Label: Archipel

Wagner: Götterdämmerung – Chorus and Orchestra of the Bayreuth Festival

- Conductor: Hans Knappertsbusch
- Principal singers: Astrid Varnay (Brünnhilde); Josef Greindl (Hagen); Wolfgang Windgassen (Siegfried); Otto Wiener (Gunther)
- Recording location & date: Bayreuth Festspielhaus, 1958
- Label: Walhall Eternity Series WLCD 0249 (4 CDs)
