= Peter Seiffert =

German tenor (1954–2025)

- Seiffert at a charity concert, 1986
- Born: 4 January 1954; Düsseldorf, West Germany
- Died: 14 April 2025 (aged 71); Schleedorf, Austria
- Occupation: Operatic tenor
- Organizations: Deutsche Oper am Rhein; Deutsche Oper Berlin
- Title: Kammersänger
- Awards: Grammy Award

Peter Seiffert (4 January 1954 – 14 April 2025) was a German tenor. He was based at the Deutsche Oper Berlin from 1980. Götz Friedrich in Berlin and Wolfgang Sawallisch at the Bavarian State Opera supported the development of his voice from lyric Mozart roles to portraying characters in Wagner's stage works such as Lohengrin, Tannhäuser and Tristan with a light lyric tenor voice of Italian timbre. He performed at international opera houses such as the Vienna State Opera, the Royal Opera House in London and the Metropolitan Opera in New York City, and at festivals including the Bayreuth Festival.

== Life and career ==
Born in Düsseldorf on 4 January 1954, his father Helmut Seiffert was an opera singer and composer of Schlager. Seiffert sang in a boys' choir, sometimes as a soloist. He studied at the Musikhochschule in Düsseldorf, especially with M. Röhrig. He also pursued training as a physical therapist.

Seiffert made his debut in 1978 at the Deutsche Oper am Rhein in Reimann's Lear. He remained a member of the ensemble for two seasons. In 1979, he achieved a second place in the Deutscher Musikwettbewerb.

=== Deutsche Oper Berlin ===
Seiffert became a member of the ensemble of the Deutsche Oper Berlin in 1980, where his roles included Lenski in Tchaikovsky's Eugen Onegin, Hans in Smetana's Die verkaufte Braut and Hüon in Weber's Oberon. He appeared as Matteo In Arabella by R. Strauss in 1982, followed by Mozart's Tamino in Die Zauberflöte and Don Ottavio in Don Giovanni. He expanded his repertoire by the title role in Gounod's Faust, and roles by Albert Lortzing and Leoš Janáček. Intendant Götz Friedrich developed him gradually to a lyric-dramatic tenor who also sang heldentenor roles; he portrayed Verdi's Otello and Pedro in d'Albert's Tiefland.

It was Lohengrin in Berlin in 1990 which marked his international breakthrough. Reviewer Klaus Geitel described it as a "Weltereignis des Wagner-Gesangs", a world event in Wagner singing, because the singer provided the "blue-silvery radiance" that Thomas Mann had admired, possible due to his light lyric tenor with an Italian timbre and a controlled vibrato. He portrayed Tristan there in 2002, and a reviewer noted that he "mastered the role brilliantly, not with the means of the dark-voiced hero, but with a slender, luminous voice", but missed a metaphysical dimension of dream and grief. In 2003 a recording of Tannhäuser with Daniel Barenboim and Seiffert in the title role was awarded the Grammy Award for Best Opera Recording. His last appearance at the house was as Tannhäuser in 2019. He had interpreted 26 roles in over 300 performances, and became an honorary member of the company in 2024.

=== Bavarian State Opera ===
Seiffert developed a close relation to the Bavarian State Opera where he first appeared in 1983 as Fenton in Nicolai's Die lustigen Weiber von Windsor. With musical director Wolfgang Sawallisch, he began in Mozart roles such as Tamino and Don Ottavio and then appeared as Nureddin in Der Barbier von Bagdad, his first recognised success. Sawallisch was the first to engage him as Lohengrin, in 1989. He went on to sing other Wagner roles there, Erik in Der fliegende Holländer, the title role in Tannhäuser, Siegmund in Die Walküre, Tristan, Walther von Stolzing in Die Meistersinger von Nürnberg and Parsifal. He also appeared there as Florestan in Beethoven's Fidelio, Max in Weber's Der Freischütz and Verdi's Otello. He performed in Munich and on tours with the ensemble to Japan in 150 performances, and also in recitals and concerts. He was named a Bavarian Kammersänger in 1992.

=== Vienna State Opera ===
Seiffert made his debut at the Vienna State Opera in 1984 as Matteo in Arabella. He appeared then as Hans, and in Wagner roles Erik, Lohengrin, Walther von Stolzing, Siegmund, Parsifal, Tannhäuser and Tristan in 2013 in a new production that was recorded live, with Nina Stemme as Isolde and Franz Welser-Möst conducting. His roles at the house also included Tamino, Max, Turiddu in Mascagni's Cavalleria rusticana and Otello. He portrayed Florestan 25 times. In 2013 he was named Austrian Kammersänger.

=== International performances ===
Seiffert appeared at the Royal Opera House in London first in 1988 as Parsifal. In the 1992 opening of the new opera house in Nagoya, Japan, he performed as the Emperor in Die Frau ohne Schatten by R. Strauss. He appeared at the 1994 Salzburg Festival as Don Ottavio. He appeared at the 1994 Salzburg Festival as Don Ottavio. He performed as Tannhäuser at the Zürich Opera in 1999.

Seiffert made his debut at the Metropolitan Opera (Met) as Tannhäuser in 2004, with Deborah Voigt as Elisabeth and Mark Elder conducting in a 1977 production by Otto Schenk. Fred Cohn from Opera News noted:

All evening long, it was a revelation to hear the role sung with such security and stamina. Seiffert brought the same freshness of voice to the Rome Narrative at the end as he did to the three successive paeans to Venus at the beginning. The voice is not intrinsically beautiful - it betrays a hint of nasality - but it's an instrument of true Wagnerian heft, with easy access to the crucial climactic notes above the staff.

Anthony Tommasini from the New York Times described him as an "imposing and charismatic Tannhäuser" with Wagnerian power but also technically agility. Seiffert appeared again as Tristan in 2008, in Barenboim's debut at the house.

=== Bayreuth ===
Seiffert established a career at the Bayreuth Festival, regularly appearing from 1996 as Stolzing and from 2001 as Lohengrin, which he last performed in 2005 with his wife as Elsa.

=== Personal life and death ===
In 1986, Seiffert married the soprano Lucia Popp, 15 years his senior. After her death in 1993, he married the Austrian soprano Petra-Maria Schnitzer.

Seiffert died following a long illness in Schleedorf, Salzburg, Austria, on 14 April 2025, at the age of 71.

== Awards ==
- 1979: Second prize at Deutscher Musikwettbewerb
- 1992: Bavarian Kammersänger
- 2002: Grammy in the category Best Opera Recording, for Wagner's Tannhäuser conducted by Daniel Barenboim
- 2013: Austrian Kammersänger
- 2014: Berlin Kammersänger

== Recordings ==
Recordings with Seiffert include:

- Strauss: Arabella, cond. Jeffrey Tate, orchestra of the Royal Opera House, 1986
- Beethoven: Fidelio, cond. Nikolaus Harnoncourt, Chamber Orchestra of Europe, 1995
- Weber: Oberon, cond. Marek Janowski, Deutsches Symphonie-Orchester Berlin, 1996
- Wagner: Lohengrin, cond. Daniel Barenboim, Staatskapelle Berlin, 1998
- Wagner: Die Meistersinger von Nürnberg, cond. Barenboim, orchestra of the Bayreuth Festival, 1999
- Wagner: Die Walküre, cond. Zubin Mehta, Bayerisches Staatsorchester, 2000
- Wagner: Der fliegende Holländer, cond. Giuseppe Sinopoli, orchestra of the Deutsche Oper Berlin, 2001
- Wagner: Der fliegende Holländer, cond. Daniel Barenboim, Staatskapelle Berlin, 2002
- Wagner: Tannhäuser, cond: Barenboim, Staatskapelle Berlin, 2002
- Wagner: Tannhäuser (DVD), cond: Franz Welser-Möst, choir and orchestra of Zürich Opera
- Wagner: Tristan und Isolde (live), cond: Franz Welser-Möst, choir and orchestra of Vienna State Opera (2013)
