= Elisabeth Schärtel =

German mezzo-soprano and contralto (1919–2012)

- Schärtel in 1955
- Born: 6 October 1919; Weiden in der Oberpfalz, Germany
- Died: 24 August 2012 (aged 92); Weiden in der Oberpfalz, Germany
- Occupations: Operatic mezzo-soprano; Operatic contralto
- Organizations: Cologne Opera; Bayreuth Festival

Elisabeth Schärtel (6 October 1919 – 24 August 2012) was a German operatic mezzo-soprano and contralto. A member of the Cologne Opera from 1959 to 1967, she performed leading parts at major European opera houses and regularly at the Bayreuth Festival.

== Career ==
Born in Weiden in der Oberpfalz, she studied with Anna Bahr-Mildenburg in Munich and with Henny Wolff in Hamburg. She made her debut in 1942 at the Stadttheater Gießen. From 1959 to 1967 she was a member of the Cologne Opera. In 1965, she appeared there as the mother of Stolzius in the premiere of Bernd Alois Zimmermann's Die Soldaten. She performed in opera recordings by the broadcaster Westdeutscher Rundfunk, such as Verdi's Falstaff with Mario Rossi conducting, where she sang Meg Page alongside Dietrich Fischer-Dieskau in the title role.

Schärtel performed at the Bayreuth Festival from 1954 to 1967, singing leading parts in Wagner's music dramas as well as minor parts. In 1954 and 1955 she appeared as Mary in Der fliegende Holländer, in 1958 to 1961 every year as Magdalene in Die Meistersinger von Nürnberg, in 1962 as Erda in Das Rheingold and Ortrud in Lohengrin.

She was a guest in European opera houses and at festivals. In 1961 she appeared at the Maggio Musicale Fiorentino as Adelaide in Arabella by Richard Strauss. In 1962 she was a guest at the Hamburg State Opera as the Nurse in Die Frau ohne Schatten by Richard Strauss, staged by Oscar Fritz Schuh and conducted by Wolfgang Sawallisch, alongside Franz Crass and Helga Pilarczyk, among others. In 1966, she appeared as Brangäne in Wagner's Tristan und Isolde at the Vienna State Opera. She performed Magdalene in Lisbon, and Kundry in Wagner's Parsifal at the Deutsche Oper Berlin.

Schärtel was a voice teacher at the Musikhochschule Nürnberg. She died in her home town and was buried on the municipal cemetery on 29 August 2012.
