= Hartmut Welker =

German opera singer (1941–2026)

Hartmut Welker (27 October 1941 – 12 September 2026) was a German operatic bass-baritone.

== Life and career ==
Welker was born in Velbert on 27 October 1941. Before he decided to study singing, he had learned and practiced the profession as a toolmaker. At the age of 28, he began studying singing at the Hochschule für Musik und Tanz Köln with Else Bischof. He made his stage debut in 1974 at the Theater Aachen in the role of Monterone in Verdi's Rigoletto, stepping in for an ill singer. From 1975 to 1977, he was engaged as a chorus singer at the Aachen Opera House, where he also performed small solo parts. He made his official debut there in 1977 as Renato in Verdi's Un ballo in maschera. He worked at the Aachen theatre until 1980 and was subsequently engaged for three years at the Badisches Staatstheater Karlsruhe, to which he later belonged as a permanent guest. During these years he had numerous guest appearances in major opera houses around the world, such as the Metropolitan Opera in New York City, the Teatro alla Scala in Milan, the Royal Opera House Covent Garden in London, the Opéra Bastille in Paris, the Vienna State Opera, Berlin State Opera and Hamburg State Opera, as well as the Bayreuth Festival, the Salzburg Festival, the Bregenz Festival and the Edinburgh Festival.

He was a member of the Hamburgische Staatsoper from 1982, the Vienna State Opera from 1985 and the Deutsche Oper Berlin from 1987. He also performed in concerts and television productions.

Welker died on 12 September 2026, at the age of 84. He was the father of the director Sebastian Welker.
