= Fritz Wunderlich =

German opera singer (1930–1966)

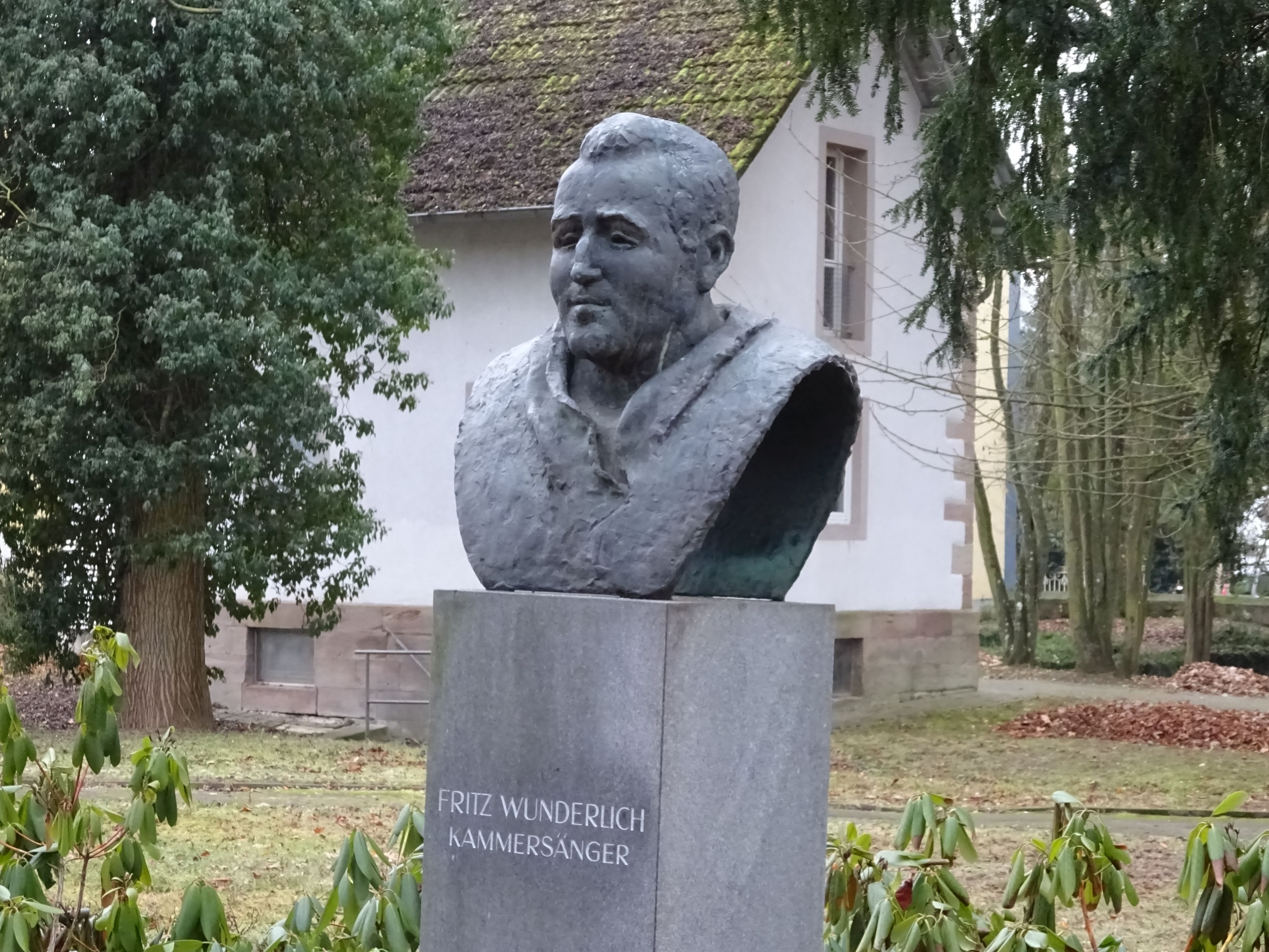
- Bust of Wunderlich in Kusel
- Born: Friedrich Karl Otto Wunderlich; 26 September 1930; Kusel, Palatinate, Germany
- Died: 17 September 1966 (aged 35); Heidelberg, Baden-Württemberg, Germany
- Resting place: Munich Waldfriedhof
- Occupation: Operatic tenor

Friedrich "Fritz" Karl Otto Wunderlich (26 September 1930 – 17 September 1966) was a German lyric tenor, famed for his singing of the Mozart repertoire and various Lieder.

== Biography ==
Wunderlich was born in Kusel in the Palatinate, Germany. His mother was a violinist and his father was a choirmaster. For a short time, the family kept the inn "Emrichs Bräustübl" (Emrich's Brewing Cottage). Fritz's father lost his job due to pressure imposed upon him by local Nazis, in addition to suffering from a severe battlefield injury. He died in 1935 by suicide when Fritz was five years old.

Fritz mastered several instruments while still a schoolboy and when he entered the Hochschule für Musik Freiburg in 1950, his principal study was the horn. Then the singing teacher Margarethe von Winterfeldt discovered and trained his voice.

In 1956, he married harpist Eva Jungnitsch (1934-2016). The couple had three children: Constanze (born 1957), Wolfgang (born 1959) and Barbara (1964-2022). The family initially lived in Stuttgart, later moving to Munich.

Wunderlich was soon noted as a brilliant young tenor, especially in Mozartian roles, but he later expanded his reach to the full range of the lyric tenor repertoire.

He occasionally sang and recorded minor Wagner roles such as the steersman in Der fliegende Holländer, Walther von der Vogelweide in Tannhäuser, and the shepherd in Tristan und Isolde. He sang and recorded the role of the Italian Tenor in Der Rosenkavalier.

== Recordings ==
External audio
- Wunderlich performing Mozart's Requiem with Herbert von Karajan conducting the Vienna Philharmonic and Leontyne Price, Eberhard Waechter, Hilde Rössel-Majdan, Walter Berry in 1960

During Wunderlich's career, German theatres used to perform operas in German. Therefore, most of his recordings of the Italian operatic repertoire are sung in German, including Verdi's La traviata and Rossini's The Barber of Seville. He sang his recording of Verdi's Requiem in Germanic Latin. Wunderlich achieved the highest distinction within the German repertory. Of special importance is the 1964 recording of Mozart's Die Zauberflöte, conducted by Karl Böhm, in which Wunderlich gave a critically acclaimed performance as Tamino, opposite sopranos Evelyn Lear as Pamina and Roberta Peters as the Queen of the Night and baritone Dietrich Fischer-Dieskau in the role of Papageno. There is also a live performance of Die Zauberflöte recorded in 1960 at the Salzburg Festival, and several recordings as Belmonte in Die Entführung aus dem Serail. Recordings also exist of lesser-known Mozart operas such as Zaide and La finta giardiniera.

Wunderlich continued to record renditions of the lieder cycles of Schubert and Schumann with pianist Hubert Giesen, who was also his artistic mentor, including Schumann's Dichterliebe. Many tenors since have emulated Wunderlich's interpretation of this cycle.

Another notable recording he left is J. S. Bach's Christmas Oratorio, alongside Gundula Janowitz, Christa Ludwig, and Franz Crass, conducted by Karl Richter. He is also the tenor on Herbert von Karajan's recording of Beethoven's Missa solemnis, with Janowitz, Ludwig, and Walter Berry. He recorded an album of pre-Bach sacred songs, featuring music of Schütz, Telemann, Buxtehude, and other less well-known composers. With Christa Ludwig he recorded Mahler's Das Lied von der Erde with the Philharmonia Orchestra conducted by Otto Klemperer.

At the time of his death, he had been recording Haydn's Die Schöpfung, with the Berlin Philharmonic and the Wiener Singverein conducted by Karajan with other soloists Janowitz, Ludwig, Berry and Fischer-Dieskau. Wunderlich had completed recording his arias, but Werner Krenn was hired to record the recitatives. Several recorded live performances of Wunderlich singing the whole part, under Karajan, survive. Numerous anthology albums of him singing arias from opera and operetta are available.

Videos include a full-length performance (in German) as Count Almaviva in Rossini's The Barber of Seville (with Hermann Prey, Erika Köth and Hans Hotter), and a recital of operatic arias.

== Death ==
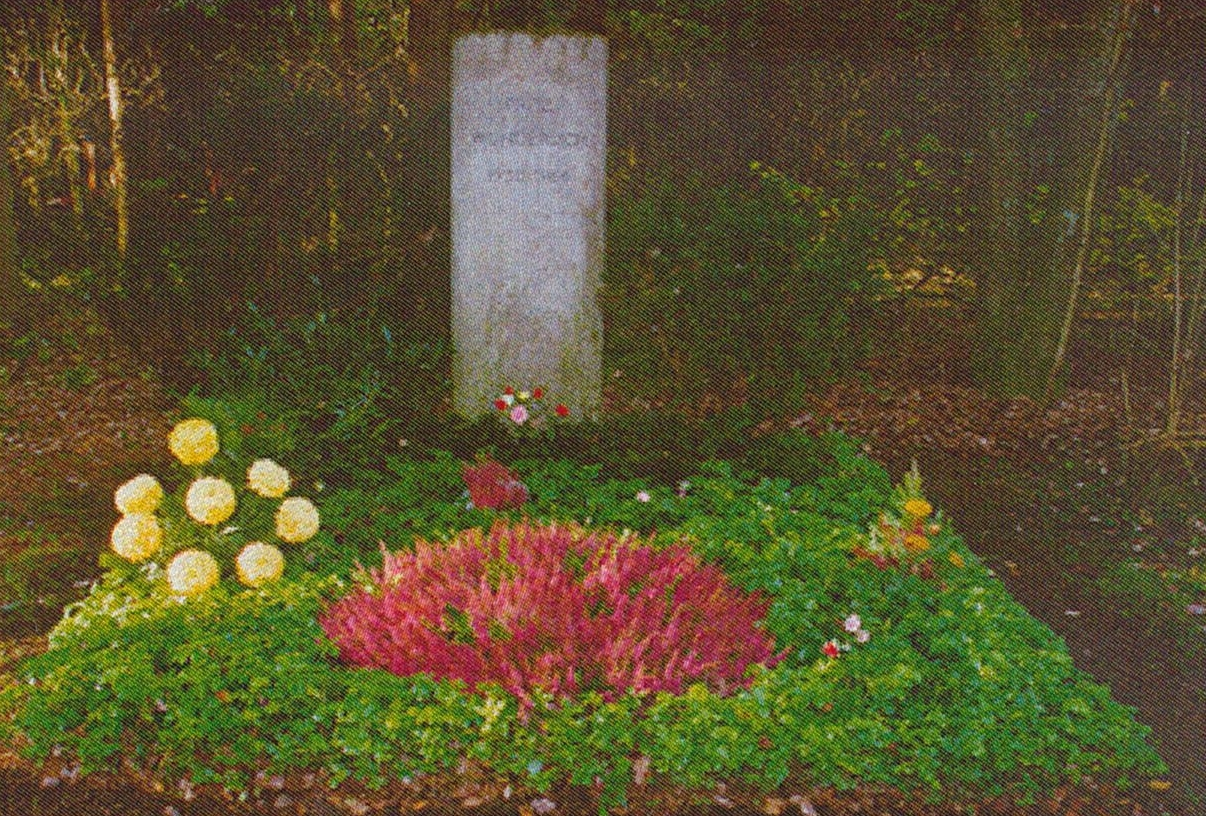
Wunderlich's gravesite in Munich. 2017.

Following his appearance at the 1966 Salzburg Festival, Wunderlich gave his final recital with Giesen on 4 September at Usher Hall in Edinburgh. Less than two weeks later, on 17 September 1966, Wunderlich died at the University Clinic of Heidelberg following an accident during a hunting holiday. He fell from a stairway in a country house owned by bass Gottlob Frick in Oberderdingen near Maulbronn after tripping on a loose shoelace, fracturing his skull. He died just nine days short of his 36th birthday and a few weeks before his scheduled debut (8 October 1966) at the Metropolitan Opera in New York City as Don Ottavio in Mozart's Don Giovanni.

Wunderlich is buried in Munich's Waldfriedhof cemetery.
