= Josef Traxel =

German opera singer

Josef Traxel (29 September 1916 in Mainz – 8 October 1975 in Stuttgart) was a German operatic tenor, particularly associated with Mozart roles and the German repertory.

He studied at the Darmstadt Conservatory, but was conscripted into the army before beginning his career. However, he was able to make his debut in Mainz, as Don Ottavio, in 1942, while on sick-leave from the army. After internment in Britain as a prisoner of war, he returned to Germany and resumed his career in Nuremberg in 1946, where he remained until 1952, he then joined the Stuttgart Opera. The same year, he appeared at the Salzburg Festival, where he sang the role of Mercury at the premiere of Richard Strauss's Die Liebe der Danae. In 1954, he first appeared at the Bayreuth Festival as Froh in Rheingold, returning as Walther in Tannhäuser, as Erik and the Steuermann in Der fliegende Holländer, the young sailor in Tristan und Isolde, a Knight in Parsifal, and in 1957, as Stolzing in Die Meistersinger von Nürnberg. He was also a frequent guest at the Munich State Opera and the Vienna State Opera, also appearing in the Netherlands and Switzerland. He frequently performed in, and recorded, sacred music.

He possessed a finely poised tenor with an unusually high tessitura, his wide repertoire ranged from Belmonte to Siegmund, he was also active in concert, often appearing in Bach's oratorios. In 1963, he was a teacher at the Stuttgart Musikhochschule.

== Sources ==
- Biography on Operissimo.com (in German)
