= James King (tenor) =

American opera singer (1925–2005)

James King (May 22, 1925 – November 20, 2005) was an American operatic tenor who had an active international singing career in operas and concerts from the 1950s through 2000. Widely regarded as one of the finest American heldentenors of the post-war period, he excelled in performances of the works of Richard Wagner and Richard Strauss.

King made several recordings during his career, most notably singing the role of Siegmund in Die Walküre for Sir Georg Solti's famous recording of Wagner's Ring cycle. He was a member of the voice faculties at the University of Missouri–Kansas City and the Jacobs School of Music of Indiana University.

== Biography ==
King was born in Dodge City, Kansas, to an Irish father and a mother of German lineage. In his youth he actively sang in church choirs and studied the violin. He earned a bachelor's degree in music from Louisiana State University in 1949, where he trained to be a baritone with Dallas Draper. He then pursued a master's degree in vocal performance from the University of Missouri–Kansas City (UMKC). He then joined the voice faculty of UMKC, where he taught for nine years and began performing in concerts and operas as a baritone.

In 1956 King came to the personal realization that he was in fact a tenor and not a baritone. He began retraining his voice with French baritone Martial Singher and later German tenor Max Lorenz in order to achieve this goal. In 1960 he began his career as a tenor as a resident artist with the Saint Louis Municipal Opera. His last performance of a baritone role was for his debut with the San Francisco Opera as Escamillo in Carmen with Marilyn Horne in the title role in May 1961.

In 1961 King won the American Opera Auditions in Cincinnati, whose prize enabled him to pursue further studies in Italy and make his European opera debut in his first tenor role, Cavaradossi in Puccini's Tosca at the Teatro della Pergola. He was soon offered contracts with major European opera houses, including the Deutsche Oper Berlin (1962), the Salzburg Festival (1962), the Vienna State Opera (1963), the Bayreuth Festival (1965), and La Scala (1968).

King made his Metropolitan Opera (Met) debut on January 8, 1966, as Florestan in Fidelio. Over the next 30 years, he sang 113 performances there. His other Met roles included the Emperor in Die Frau ohne Schatten; Aegisthus in Elektra; Calaf in Turandot; Lohengrin; Don Jose in Carmen; Erik in Der fliegende Holländer; Siegmund in Die Walküre; Bacchus in Ariadne auf Naxos; Cavaradossi in Tosca; Walther in Die Meistersinger; Captain Vere in Billy Budd; and the Drum Major in Wozzeck. His final appearance was on April 27, 1996, singing Walther in the finale of Die Meistersinger to conclude the James Levine Gala.

Later in life, King was a music and voice professor at the Jacobs School of Music at Indiana University (IU) from 1984 until his retirement from teaching in 2002. His last performance was in 2000 as Siegmund at IU.

King died of a heart attack in Naples, Florida on November 20, 2005 at the age of 80.
