= Leonie Rysanek =

Austrian dramatic soprano (1926–1998)

- Rysanek, c. 1960
- Born: Leopoldine Rysanek; 14 November 1926; Vienna, Austria
- Died: 7 March 1998 (aged 71)
- Occupation: Operatic soprano
- Spouses: Rudolf Großmann (voice teacher); Ernst-Ludwig Grosmann (Journalist)

Leopoldine Rysanek (14 November 1926 – 7 March 1998), known professionally as Leonie Rysanek, was an Austrian soprano singer.

== Career ==
Rysanek made her operatic debut in 1949 in Innsbruck, Austria.

In 1951, at the Bayreuth Festival reopening following World War II, Wieland Wagner asked her to sing as Sieglinde in Die Walküre, conducted by Herbert von Karajan.

On 18 September 1956, Rysanek made her American debut at the San Francisco Opera in Der fliegende Holländer, the first of 19 roles in San Francisco. She also performed there in the operas Ariadne auf Naxos, Macbeth, Turandot, Un ballo in maschera, La forza del destino, Tannhäuser, Aida, Salome (as Salome and Herodias), Tosca, Der Rosenkavalier, Die Frau ohne Schatten, Die Walküre, Lohengrin (as Elsa and Ortrud), Jenůfa (as Kostelnička), and The Queen of Spades (as the Countess). Her last San Francisco performance was on 12 December 1993.

Rysanek debuted at the Metropolitan Opera in 1959 as Lady Macbeth in Verdi's Macbeth, replacing Maria Callas in the production. Throughout her career, she sang 299 performances in 24 roles there. She starred as Abigaille in the Met's first-ever productions of Verdi's Nabucco, in the title role of Richard Strauss's Ariadne auf Naxos, as the Empress in Strauss's Die Frau ohne Schatten, and in Janáček's Káťa Kabanová. Her other roles at the Met included the title-role in Aida, Elisabetta in Don Carlos, Leonora in La forza del destino, Desdemona in Otello, Amelia in Un ballo in maschera, the title-role in Tosca, Senta in Der fliegende Holländer, Elisabeth in Tannhäuser (opera), Elsa and later Ortrud in Lohengrin (opera), Sieglinde in Die Walküre, Kundry in Parsifal, Chrysothemis and later Klytämnestra in Elektra (opera), the Marschallin in Der Rosenkavalier, the title-role in Salome (opera), Leonore in Fidelio, and Kostelnicka in Jenůfa. For her 25th anniversary with the company in 1984, the Met put on a gala performance of the first act of Die Walküre and the second act of Parsifal, making her one of the very few artists in the Met’s history to have received such an honor. The applause at the end reportedly lasted 20 minutes.

From late 1995 to early 1996, she performed as the Countess in Tchaikovsky's The Queen of Spades for her final season at the Metropolitan Opera, during which she received confirmation of a cancer diagnosis. She left the Metropolitan Opera in early 1996 and her final performance was at the Salzburg Festival in August 1996, as Klytämnestra in Elektra by Richard Strauss.

== Voice and roles ==
Rysanek was known for her performances in the operas of Richard Strauss. Her Strauss roles included the Empress (Kaiserin) in Die Frau ohne Schatten, the title role in Salome, the Marschallin in Der Rosenkavalier and Chrysothemis in Elektra. She was an acclaimed Ariadne (prima donna) in Ariadne auf Naxos and sang the title-roles in rarely-staged Strauss operas (Die ägyptische Helena and Die Liebe der Danae). She did not sing Salome until 1972, when she was 45, although she kept the role of Sieglinde in her active repertoire from her early 20s until age 62.

She avoided offers to sing Isolde in Wagner's Tristan und Isolde. She sang Brünnhilde in Die Walküre in 1950, in Innsbruck, but did not return to the role. Among her achievements was her performance in Die Walküre the same week as her appearance as Gilda in Rigoletto.

Rysanek sang the title role of Tosca often, and sang Leonore in Beethoven's Fidelio. In Wagner works, she often sang Elisabeth in Tannhäuser, as well as Elsa and Ortrud in Lohengrin. One of the roles most closely associated with her, in addition to Strauss's Kaiserin and Chrysothemis, was Sieglinde in Die Walküre.

Rysanek also took on a number of leading Verdi roles, most notably Desdemona in Otello, Lady Macbeth, Amelia in Un ballo in maschera, Elisabetta in Don Carlos, Leonora in La forza del destino, and the title role in Aida. In 1960, she sang Abigaille in the Metropolitan Opera's inaugural staging of Nabucco. Beyond the German and Italian repertoire, she also developed a keen interest in Czech opera, particularly the works of Smetana and Janáček, despite Czech not being a language spoken in her home.

Rysanek sang Turandot and was praised for her role as Kundry in Parsifal at the Met Opera, Vienna, and the Bayreuth Festival. She had begun her career when Kirsten Flagstad was still alive and Birgit Nilsson and Astrid Varnay were at the peak of their vocal abilities. In 1981, Karl Böhm persuaded her to sing Elektra for a Unitel film (with the soundtrack recorded in the studio), instead of a live production in an opera house. In her later years, Rysanek reverted to mezzo-soprano roles like Herodias in Salome, Klytemnestra in Elektra, and the Kostelnička in Janáček's Jenůfa.

== Officially published recordings ==
(Format: work (composer), role, conductor, year of recording, record label)

- Die Walküre Act 3 (Richard Wagner), Sieglinde, Herbert von Karajan, 1951, EMI
- Die Walküre (Richard Wagner), Sieglinde, Wilhelm Furtwängler, 1954, EMI
- Die Frau ohne Schatten (Richard Strauss), Kaiserin, Karl Böhm, 1955, Decca
- Fidelio (Ludwig van Beethoven), Leonore, Ferenc Fricsay, 1957, Deutsche Grammophon
- Operatic Arias, Arturo Basile, 1958, RCA Victor
- Ariadne auf Naxos (Richard Strauss), Ariadne (prima donna), Erich Leinsdorf, 1958, Decca
- Macbeth (Giuseppe Verdi), Lady Macbeth, Erich Leinsdorf, 1959, RCA Victor
- Otello (Giuseppe Verdi), Desdemona, Tullio Serafin, 1960, RCA Victor
- Requiem (Giuseppe Verdi), soprano, Herbert von Karajan 1960, EMI
- Der fliegende Holländer (Richard Wagner), Senta, Antal Doráti, 1961, Decca
- Die Frau ohne Schatten (Richard Strauss), Kaiserin, Herbert von Karajan 1964, Deutsche Grammophon
- Die Walküre (Richard Wagner), Sieglinde, Karl Böhm, 1967, Philips
- Médée (Luigi Cherubini), Medea, Horst Stein, 1972, RCA
- Die Frau ohne Schatten (Richard Strauss), Kaiserin, Karl Böhm, 1977, Deutsche Grammophon
- Elektra (Richard Strauss), Elektra, Karl Böhm, 1981, Unitel (video)
- Jenůfa (Leoš Janáček), Kostelnička, Eve Queler, 1988, BIS
- Salome (Richard Strauss), Herodias, Giuseppe Sinopoli, 1990, Deutsche Grammophon
- Elektra (Richard Strauss), Klytaemnestra, Jeffrey Tate, 1990, Claves
- Elektra (Richard Strauss), Klytaemnestra, Friedemann Layer, 1995, Actes Sud Musicales

== Other recordings ==
- Senta in Der fliegende Holländer: Bayreuth Festival 1959, cond. Wolfgang Sawallisch
- Sieglinde in Die Walküre: Bayreuth Festival 1958, cond. Hans Knappertsbusch
- Title role in Salome: Chorégies d'Orange 1974, cond. Rudolf Kempe
- Gioconda in La Gioconda: Berlin State Opera, 1974, cond. Giuseppe Patanè
- Chrysothemis in Elektra: Cologne Radio 1953, cond. Richard Kraus; and Bavarian State Opera 1955, cond. Karl Böhm
- Elisabeth in Tannhäuser: Bayreuth Festival 1964, cond. Otmar Suitner; and 1966, cond. Carl Melles
- Elsa in Lohengrin: Bayreuth Festival 1958, cond. André Cluytens
- Danae in Die Liebe der Danae: Bavarian State Opera 1953, cond. Kurt Eichhorn
- Helena in Die ägyptische Helena: Bavarian State Opera 1956, cond. Joseph Keilberth
- Title role in Aida: Vienna State Opera 1955, cond. Rafael Kubelík (sung in German)
- Amelia in Un ballo in maschera: Metropolitan Opera 1962, cond. Nello Santi

== Decorations and awards ==
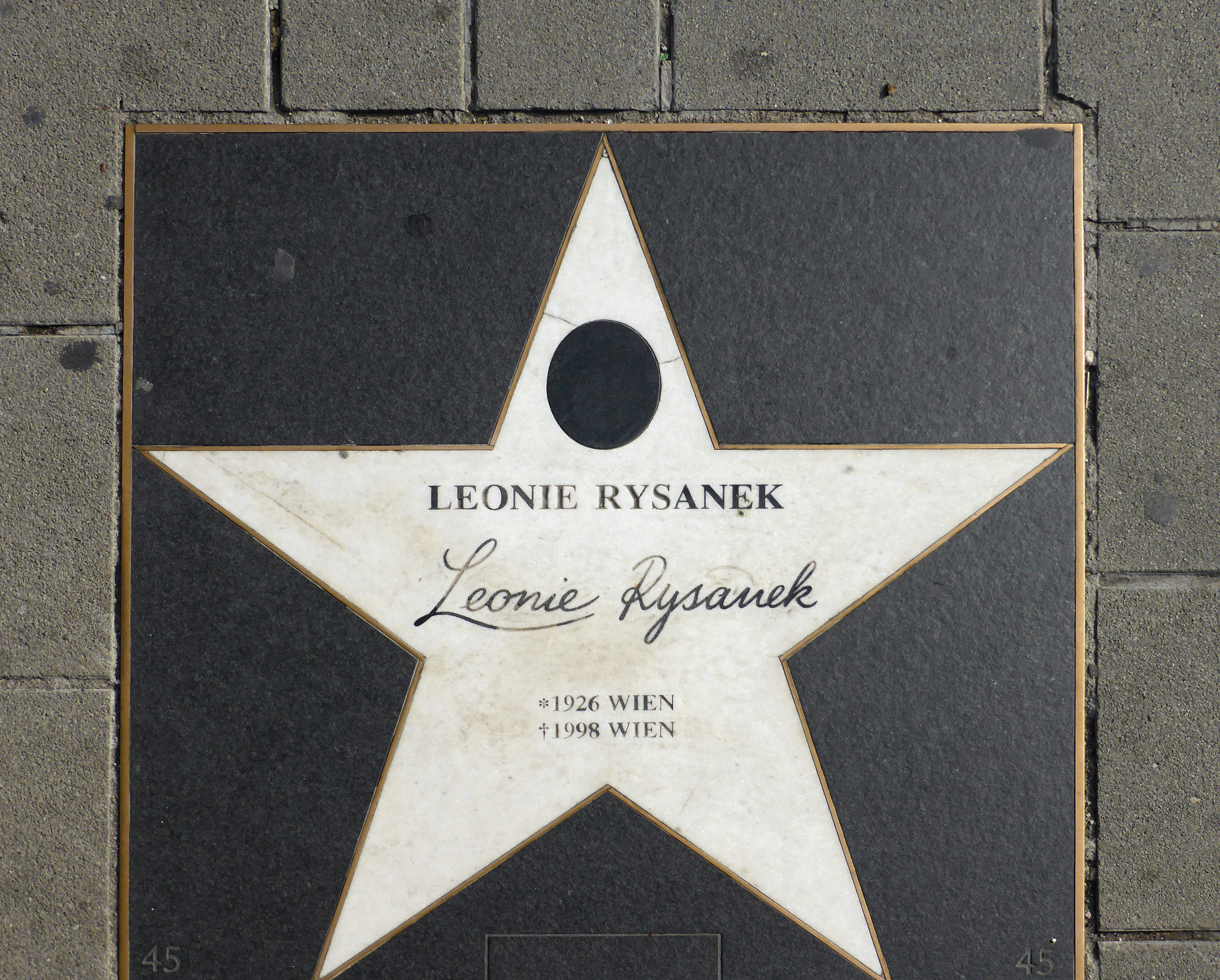
Rysanek's star on the Vienna Walk of Fame

- 1956: Österreichische Kammersängerin
- 1956: Bayerische Kammersängerin
- 1956: Silver rose of the Vienna Philharmonic
- 1991: Commander of the Order of Arts and Letters (France)
- 1996: Grand Gold Decoration for Services to the Republic of Austria

=== Honorary memberships ===
- 1974: Honorary member of the Vienna State Opera
- 1984: Honorary member of the Metropolitan Opera
- 1986: Honorary member of the San Francisco Opera
- 1994: Honorary member of the Opéra de Marseille

== Personal life ==
Rysanek, like her sister soprano Lotte Rysanek, was born in Vienna as one of six children to a Czech father and an Austrian mother. She attended the Vienna Academy at 16, where she studied with baritone Alfred Jerger as well as baritone Rudolf Grossman, who became her husband.

She was appointed curator of the Vienna Festival a few months after her retirement, which she held until her death from bone cancer in 1998, at the age of 71. Two days later, the premiere of a Metropolitan Opera new production of Wagner's Lohengrin with Ben Heppner in the title role was dedicated to her. She had sung five performances as Elsa and eight as Ortrud in three previous Met productions between 1964 and 1986.
