= Hans Knappertsbusch =

German conductor (1888–1965)

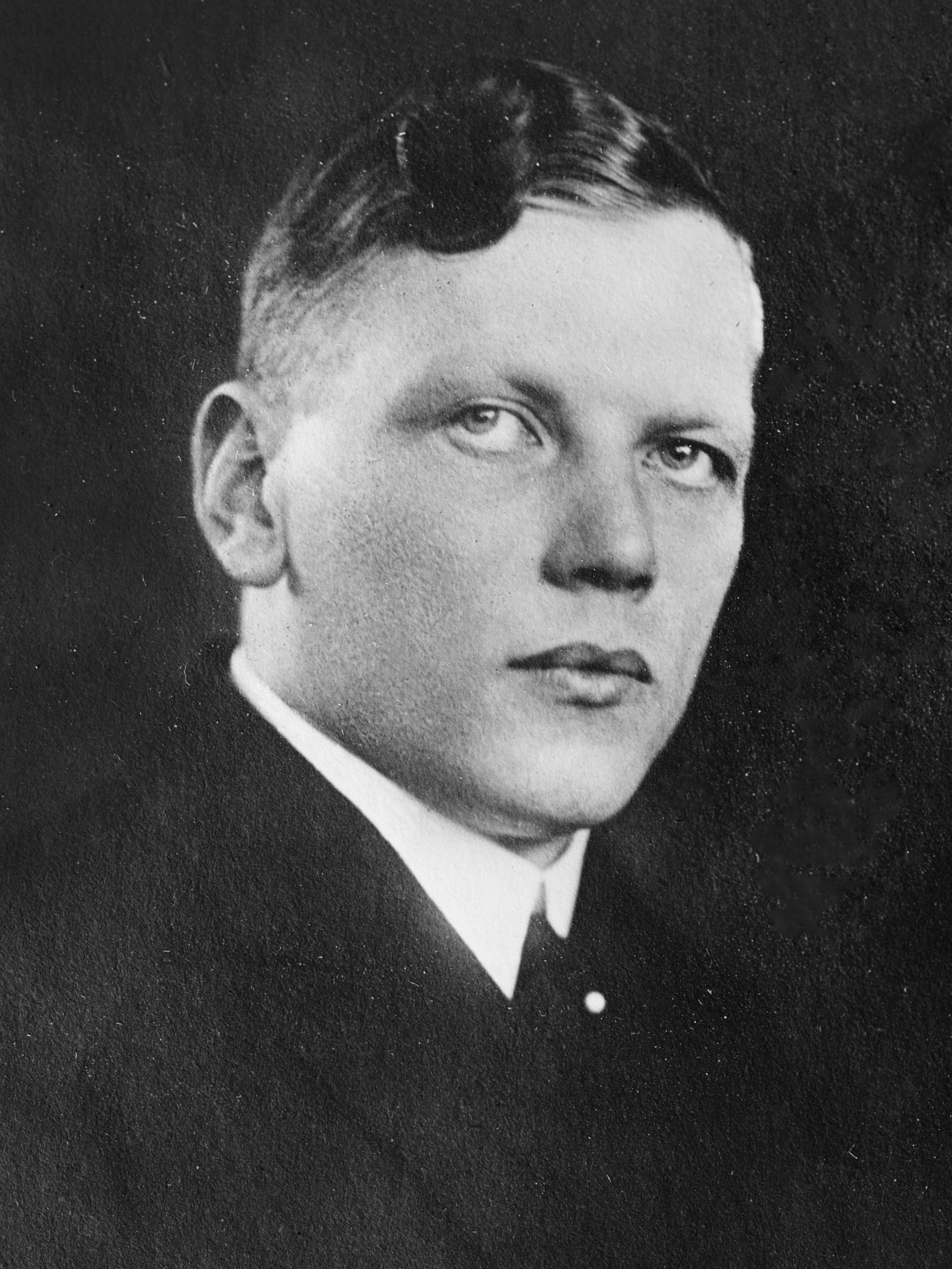
Hans Knappertsbusch

Hans Knappertsbusch (12 March 1888 – 25 October 1965) was a German conductor, best known for his performances of the music of Wagner, Bruckner and Richard Strauss.

Knappertsbusch followed the traditional route for an aspiring conductor in Germany in the early 20th century, starting as a musical assistant and progressing to increasingly senior conducting posts. In 1922, at the age of 34, he was appointed general music director of the Bavarian State Opera, holding that post for eleven years. In 1936 the Nazi régime dismissed him. As a freelance he was a frequent guest conductor in Vienna and Bayreuth, where his performances of Parsifal became celebrated.

Studio recording did not suit Knappertsbusch, whose best-known recordings were made live during performances at Bayreuth. He died at the age of 77, following a bad fall the previous year.

== Life and career ==
=== Early years ===
Knappertsbusch was born in Elberfeld, today's Wuppertal, on 12 March 1888, the second son of a manufacturer, Gustav Knappertsbusch, and his wife Julie, née Wiegand. He played the violin as a child, and later the cornet. By the age of 12 he was conducting his high school orchestra. His parents did not approve of his aspirations to a musical career, and he was sent to study philosophy at Bonn University. From 1908 he also attended the Cologne Conservatory, where he studied conducting with the principal, Fritz Steinbach.

He conducted at the Mülheim-Ruhr theatre from 1910 to 1912; more significant, according to Grove's Dictionary of Music and Musicians, were his summers as assistant to Siegfried Wagner and Hans Richter at Bayreuth.

=== Elberfeld, Leipzig, Dessau and Munich ===
Knappertsbusch began his career with a conducting post in Elberfeld. During the First World War he served in the German army as a non-combatant musician based in Berlin. In May 1918 he married Ellen Selma Neuhaus, who also came from Elberfeld. They had one child, Anita (1919–1938). After conducting in Leipzig (1918–1919), he succeeded Franz Mikorey in 1919 at Dessau, becoming Germany's youngest general music director.

When Bruno Walter left Munich for New York in 1922, Knappertsbusch succeeded him as general music director of the Bavarian State Orchestra and the Bavarian State Opera. In 1925 Knappertsbusch and his wife divorced. The following year he married Marion von Leipzig (1888–1984); this marriage, which was childless, lasted for the rest of his life.

Knappertsbusch remained in Munich for eleven years. He invited guest conductors such as Richard Strauss and Sir Thomas Beecham, and won high praise for his own conducting. After a 1931 Parsifal, one reviewer wrote, "Few conductors have the courage to take this opera slowly enough. Professor Knappertsbusch, however, gave a thoroughly well-balanced interpretation … full of life, full of philosophy and full of charm". The same reviewer observed that Knappertsbusch's experience at Bayreuth before the war had given him an advantage over rival conductors such as Arturo Toscanini and Wilhelm Furtwängler. He was musically conservative, but conducted the premieres of seven operas during his time at Munich: Don Gil von den grünen Hosen by Walter Braunfels, Das Himmelskleid by Ermanno Wolf-Ferrari, Samuel Pepys by Albert Coates, Die geliebte Stimme by Jaromír Weinberger, Lucedia by Vittorio Giannini, and Das Herz by Hans Pfitzner. A visiting English conductor, Adrian Boult, found Knappertsbusch's performances of Mozart lacking in rhythmic precision, but praised his conducting of Wagner, remarking that even Arthur Nikisch could not have produced a more overwhelming performance of Tristan und Isolde.

=== 1936 to 1945 ===
In 1936 the Nazis, who had been in power in Germany since 1933, revoked Knappertsbusch's lifetime contract at the State Opera. There were evidently several reasons for this: he refused to join the Nazi Party and was frequently rude about the régime; (Note: In a 1996 study Michael Kater plays down this factor, suggesting that Knappertsbusch's ideological hostility to the Nazis was not particularly strong, and ascribing his dismissal more to Nazi complaints about his administration of the opera and to Adolf Hitler's dislike.) budgetary constraints meant little to him; and Adolf Hitler, who had strong ideas about music, did not like his slow tempi, calling him "that military bandleader".

During the next nine years, Knappertsbusch worked mostly in Austria conducting at the Staatsoper and the Salzburg Festival, and continuing a long association with the Vienna Philharmonic. He guest-conducted in Budapest, and at Covent Garden, London. (Note: Knappertsbusch conducted Tannhäuser in Budapest (1937) and Salome in London (1937).) He was allowed to go on conducting under Nazi rule, although Munich remained closed to him. In Vienna, on 30 June 1944, he conducted the last performance at the old Staatsoper, which was destroyed by bombing hours later. The president of the Vienna Philharmonic recalled:

The bombardment of Vienna was beginning. Already in June shells were falling on the outskirts of the city, and every member of the orchestra knew that Götterdämmerung was going to be our final performance in the old house. It was Götterdämmerung in more senses than one: it was the end of an era. … everyone had this same feeling. Knappertsbusch conducted, and I think it was one of the greatest performances of his life.

=== Post-war ===
After the war there was a widespread desire in Munich for Knappertsbusch's return, but like the other leading musicians who had worked under the Nazi régime he was subject to a process of denazification, and the occupying American forces appointed Georg Solti as general music director of the State Opera. Solti, a young Jewish musician who had been in exile in Switzerland during the war, later recalled:

Of all the people who might have had reason to resent my appointment in Munich after the war, there was one who had more reason than anyone else: that was Hans Knappertsbusch. There was in fact one man who really helped me, in my inexperience: that was Hans Knappertsbusch. He was a father to me."

After this Knappertsbusch mostly freelanced. He declined an invitation to conduct at the Metropolitan Opera in New York, but continued to appear as a guest artist in Vienna and elsewhere, and became a pillar of the Bayreuth Festival. He conducted the first performances of Der Ring des Nibelungen at the festival's post-war reopening in 1951. He was outspoken in his dislike of Wieland Wagner's frugal and minimalist productions, but returned to the festival most years for the rest of his life. He was most associated there with Parsifal: of his 95 appearances at Bayreuth, 55 of them were conducting it. He worked mainly in Germany and Austria, but conducted in Paris from time to time, including a 1956 Tristan und Isolde with Astrid Varnay at the Opéra. He returned to the Bavarian State Opera in 1954, and continued to conduct there for the rest of his life. In 1955 he returned to the Vienna State Opera, to conduct Der Rosenkavalier as one of the productions given to mark the re-opening of the theatre.

In 1964 Knappertsbusch had a bad fall, from which he never fully recovered. He died on 25 October the following year at the age of 77, and was buried in the Bogenhausen cemetery in Munich. He was greatly mourned by his colleagues. In 1967, the record producer John Culshaw wrote:

It is not often that there is a true bond of affection between an orchestra and a conductor, and especially so in the case of an orchestra with so long and proud a tradition of its own as the Vienna Philharmonic. The older members still talk with awe about Furtwängler and Richard Strauss. They speak with profound respect for the memories of Erich Kleiber and Clemens Krauss and Bruno Walter. For others, still living, they have mixed feelings ranging from loathing to admiration. But for Hans Knappertsbusch, they had love.

== Reputation and legacy ==
Knappertsbusch, known familiarly as "Kna", was described as a ruppiger Humanist ("rough humanist"). He was capable of ferocious tirades in rehearsal – usually at singers: he got on much better with orchestras. Culshaw wrote of him:

He was the kindest, most modest conductor I have ever worked with. He was unfailingly generous to his colleagues. He would never join the rat race for fame and honour. In the theatre I believe that he was a Wagner conductor of supreme ability. I know why orchestras loved him. I know why we loved him.

=== Recordings ===
Knappertsbusch did not take the gramophone as seriously as some of his colleagues did. Although he was praised for such recordings as his 1931 Munich version of Beethoven's Seventh Symphony ("a monument of unfaltering fire", according to one reviewer), he was not at home in the recording studio. Culshaw wrote:

The truth was that Knappertsbusch took very badly to recording conditions, and, no matter what we did, the genius which he so certainly revealed in the theatre refused to come alive in the studio. … He needed the smell of greasepaint, and the waft of air from backstage. He needed the uncertainty of the theatre, and the comfortable feeling that in the theatre you can, as a conductor, take huge risks in the knowledge that if something ends in disaster only a minority of the audience will realise it at all, while the orchestra will know what it was about and will be forgiving. None of this applies to recording, and the resulting inhibitions were too much for him.

For Decca, Knappertsbusch recorded mostly with the Vienna Philharmonic, but also with the London Philharmonic, the Paris Conservatoire Orchestra, the Zurich Tonhalle Orchestra and the Suisse Romande Orchestra. Wagner, including a complete studio recording of Die Meistersinger, predominated, but also included were works by Beethoven, Brahms, Bruckner, Schubert, Strauss (Johann and family as well as Richard), Tchaikovsky and Weber. Recordings made for RIAS feature Knappertsbusch conducting the Berlin Philharmonic in symphonies by Beethoven (No. 8), Bruckner (No. 8 and No. 9), Haydn (The Surprise), and Schubert (The Unfinished). The same forces recorded The Nutcracker Suite and Viennese dance and operetta music.

Some of Knappertsbusch's best-received recordings were made during live performances at Bayreuth in the 1950s and 1960s. A Parsifal from 1951 was issued by Decca, and a 1962 performance was recorded by Philips. Both have remained in the catalogues, and when the 1962 set was transferred to CD, Alan Blyth wrote in Gramophone, "this is the most moving and satisfying account of Parsifal ever recorded, and one that for various reasons will not easily be surpassed. Nobody today … can match Knappertsbusch's combination of line and emotional power". In 1951 the Decca team also recorded The Ring conducted by Knappertsbusch, but for contractual reasons it could not be published at the time. (Note: Götterdämmerung from that 1951 cycle was published in 1999.)

== Notes, references and sources ==
=== Sources ===
- Culshaw, John (1967). Ring Resounding. London: Secker & Warburg. ISBN 978-0-436-11800-5.
- Gregor, Neil (2025). The Symphony Concert in Nazi Germany. Chicago: University of Chicago Press. ISBN 978-0226839103.
- Kater, Michael (1999). The Twisted Muse: Musicians and their Music in the Third Reich. New York: Oxford University Press. ISBN 978-0-19-513242-7.
- Monod, David (2016). Settling Scores: German Music, Denazification, and the Americans 1945–1953. Chapel Hill: University of North Carolina Press. ISBN 978-1-4696-3404-3.
