= Franz Crass =

German bass singer

Franz Crass (9 March 1928 – 23 June 2012) was a German bass singer.

A native of Wipperfürth, Rhine Province, Crass studied with Gerda Heuer in Wiesbaden and with Professor Clemens Glettenberg at the Hochschule für Musik in Köln. He won numerous competitions throughout Germany in the 1950s. In 1954, he made his debut at the municipal theater in Krefeld; from 1956 he sang at the Landestheater Hannover.

Crass established a reputation as a Wagnerian early in his career, appearing at the Bayreuth Festival between 1954 and 1973. He made guest appearances throughout Germany, and was a regular member of the Köln Opera from 1962 until 1964. In addition to his work as a concert and oratorio singer, he became known for singing works of Wolfgang Amadeus Mozart.

Crass developed hearing problems and as a result, ended his career abruptly in 1981; after that he devoted himself to coaching younger singers. He died in Rüsselsheim, in 2012, aged 84.

The Kammersänger left recordings as Heinrich der Vogler in Lohengrin (opposite Anja Silja's Elsa), Sarastro in Die Zauberflöte (opposite Fritz Wunderlich and Dietrich Fischer-Dieskau, conducted by Karl Böhm), the Sprecher and Second Armed Man in Otto Klemperer's famous recording of Die Zauberflöte, the Commendatore in Don Giovanni, the title role in Der fliegende Holländer, Gurnemanz in Parsifal, Don Fernando in Fidelio (with Christa Ludwig); also as baritone soloist in the Brahms Requiem and Bach's Christmas Oratorio, and as bass soloist in the Mozart Requiem.

== Sources ==
- Biography at Bach-Cantatas.com
- allmusic biography
