= René Kollo =

German tenor (born 1937)

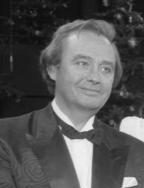
- René Kollo in 1986
- Born: René Kollodzieyski; 20 November 1937 (age 88); Berlin, Germany
- Occupation: Operatic tenor
- Years active: 1965–2013

René Kollo (born 20 November 1937) is a German operatic tenor, especially known for his Wagnerian Heldentenor roles. He also performed a wide variety of operas and operettas, and made several recordings.

== Biography ==
Born René Kollodzieyski in Berlin, he grew up in Wyk auf Föhr. He attended a photography school in Hamburg, although he had always been interested in music, particularly conducting. He did not begin to perform (as a self-taught drummer) until the mid-50s. He played in jazz clubs and studied acting with Else Bongers in Berlin. To prepare for musical roles, he studied with Elsa Varena, who quickly recognized that he had an unusual gift.

He signed his first recording contract at 20 and recorded popular hits. He made his operatic debut in Braunschweig in 1965 in three Stravinsky one-act operas: Mavra, Renard, and Oedipus Rex. He stayed in Braunschweig for two years, singing most of the lyric tenor repertoire. In 1967, he went to the Deutsche Oper am Rhein in Düsseldorf, still singing lyric roles.

He was guest soloist in Munich, Frankfurt, Milan (La Scala, in Arabella, 1970; Das Rheingold, 1973; Fidelio, 1978; and Lohengrin, 1981), and Lisbon. He began his now legendary association with Wagner and his Heldentenor roles at the Bayreuth Festival in 1969, where he sang the Helmsman in Der fliegende Holländer. The major Wagnerian roles followed in quick succession: Erik in 1970, Lohengrin in 1971, Walter in 1973, Parsifal in 1975, Siegfried in 1976, Tristan and Tannhäuser in 1981. He has since sung these roles at major opera houses throughout the world, including the Metropolitan Opera, where he was seen in Lohengrin (1976, conducted by James Levine) and Ariadne auf Naxos (1979).

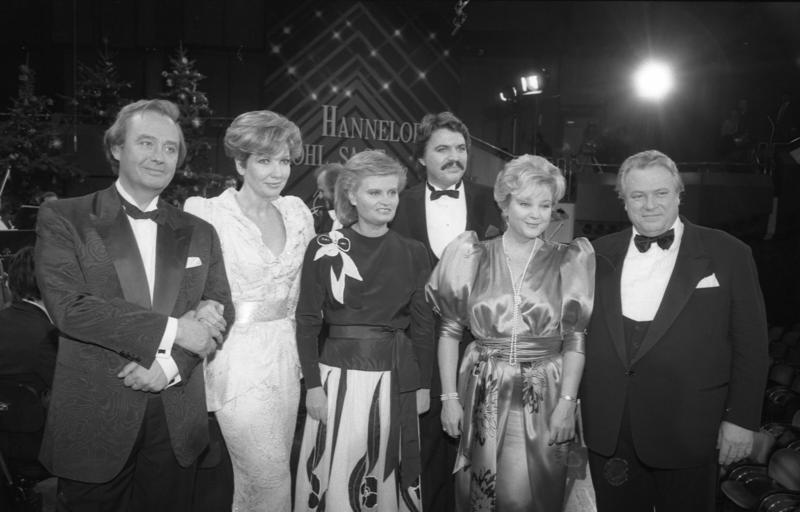
Kollo at a ZNS – Hannelore Kohl Stiftung benefit concert in 1986. From left to right are Kollo, journalist Carolin Reiber, Hannelore Kohl, tenor Peter Seiffert, soprano Lucia Popp, and actor Günter Strack.

He has also directed Parsifal in Darmstadt in 1986 and Tiefland by Eugen d'Albert in Ulm in 1991.

He also has sung non-Wagnerian roles, including Hermann in Tchaikovsky's The Queen of Spades, Florestan in Fidelio, Britten's Peter Grimes, and Verdi's Otello. In fact, he has an unusually wide repertoire for a Heldentenor. Other tenor roles he sang were that of Count Danilo, in Herbert von Karajan's 1972–1973 recording of Franz Lehár's operetta The Merry Widow, with Elizabeth Harwood and Teresa Stratas, and Prince Edwin in the 1971 film of Emmerich Kálmán's operetta Die Csárdásfürstin with Anna Moffo and Dagmar Koller.

Kollo has not confined himself to grand opera, but made many television appearances, singing lighter repertoire, including an operetta he composed himself. He has also composed and written text for numerous songs, following in the steps of both his father (Willi Kollo) and his grandfather (Walter Kollo), who were operetta composers. He retired from singing in 2013 at the age of 75.

=== Personal life ===
In 1967, he married pop singer Dorthe Larsen; the couple had a daughter, Nathalie. He has been married since 1982 to Beatrice Bouquet (a dancer) and they have three children, Florence, Magali, and Oliver Walter.

== Recordings ==
Kollo has made numerous recordings, including Tannhäuser (conducted by Sir Georg Solti, 1970), Das Lied von der Erde (Karajan 1973), Die Meistersinger von Nürnberg (Karajan 1970, and, later, Solti, 1975–76), Parsifal (Solti, 1971–72, and, later, Herbert Kegel, 1975), Die tote Stadt (with Carol Neblett, conducted by Erich Leinsdorf, 1975), The Bartered Bride (with Stratas, conducted by Jaroslav Krombholc, 1975), Rienzi (conducted by Heinrich Hollreiser, 1974–76), Der fliegende Holländer (Solti, 1976), Ariadne auf Naxos (Solti, 1977), Fidelio (conducted by Leonard Bernstein, 1978), Der Freischütz (conducted by Rafael Kubelík, 1979), Lohengrin (with Dunja Vejzovic as Ortrud, led by Karajan 1975–81), Siegfried (conducted by Marek Janowski, 1982), Tristan und Isolde (with Dame Margaret Price, conducted by Carlos Kleiber, 1980–82), Götterdämmerung (Janowski, 1983), Die Frau ohne Schatten (with Cheryl Studer as the Empress (Kaiserin), conducted by Wolfgang Sawallisch, 1987), and Die Dreigroschenoper (with Helge Dernesch, led by John Mauceri, 1988). Kollo has also recorded the Wesendonck Lieder (conducted by Christian Thielemann, 1992).

On video, two performances of his Tristan can be found: a 1983 production staged at the Bayreuth Festival by Jean-Pierre Ponnelle (with Johanna Meier as Isolde) and a 1993 production from Berlin, directed by Götz Friedrich (with Dame Gwyneth Jones as the Irish princess).
