= Josef Greindl =

German opera singer (1912–1993)

Josef Greindl (23 December 1912 - 16 April 1993) was a German operatic bass, remembered mainly for his performances of Wagnerian roles at Bayreuth beginning in 1943.

Josef Greindl was born in Munich and studied at the Munich Music Academy with Paul Bender. His opera debut was in 1936, as Hunding in Wagner's Die Walküre in the State Theatre in Krefeld. In 1944, Adolf Hitler included him in the Gottbegnadeten list ("God-gifted list" or "Important Artist Exempt List" of artists considered crucial to Nazi culture), which exempted him from the requirement to serve in the German military. He played the part of King Marke in the 1952 Furtwängler recording of Tristan und Isolde. This vintage recording often appears in critics list of the top 100 greatest recordings. He sang at the Metropolitan Opera in 1952–3. He sang in Wieland Wagner's last Ring.

In 1973, he became a professor at the Vienna Hochschule and later died in that city (in 1993).

From the mid-1940s through the late 1960s he was one of the three or four leading performers of Wagner's and Mozart's big bass roles, possessing the size and strength for the former and the dexterity, brains, and extreme range for the latter. He frequently appeared as Fafner, Hunding, and Hagen in the same performance of the Ring Cycle, which made him the only singer in the cast who had to perform all four nights. His earliest recorded singing was at Bayreuth, as Pogner the goldsmith, a character in his fifties or sixties, in 1943 when he (Greindl) was 30 years old.

Greindl's recorded repertoire includes operatic roles by Gluck, Verdi, Richard Strauss, Schoenberg, Puccini, Smetana, Weber, Flotow, Berg, Orff, Cimarosa, Lortzing, and Beethoven; lieder by Schubert, Schumann, and Carl Loewe; and sacred music by Bach, Handel, Heinrich Schütz, Haydn, Mozart, Beethoven, Verdi, Schubert, Dvorak, and Rossini.

Although known for low bass parts, Greindl also performed in higher-pitched roles in the 1960s: Hans Sachs (at which he excelled), the Wanderer in Siegfried, the title character in Der fliegende Holländer and even Don Alfonso in Così fan tutte.

He can be seen on video as Hans Sachs, Hagen (brief excerpts only), Rocco, King Phillip, Geronimo in Il matrimonio segreto, the Commendatore, and as Hunding in a concert performance of Act I of Die Walküre.
