= Tristan und Isolde discography =

This is an audio and video discography of Tristan und Isolde, an opera by Richard Wagner which was first performed on 10 June 1865 in Munich.

== Recording history ==
Tristan und Isolde has a long recorded history. In the years before World War II, Kirsten Flagstad and Lauritz Melchior were considered to be the prime interpreters of the lead roles, and mono recordings exist of this pair in a number of live performances led by conductors such as Thomas Beecham, Fritz Reiner, Artur Bodanzky and Erich Leinsdorf. Flagstad recorded the part commercially only near the end of her career in 1952, under Wilhelm Furtwängler for EMI, producing a set which is considered a classic recording. Following the war, the performances at Bayreuth with Martha Mödl and Ramon Vinay under Herbert von Karajan (1952) were highly regarded, and these performances are now available as a live recording. In the 1960s, the soprano Birgit Nilsson was considered the major Isolde interpreter, and she was often partnered with the Tristan of Wolfgang Windgassen. Their performance at Bayreuth in 1966 under the baton of Karl Böhm was captured by Deutsche Grammophon—a performance often hailed as one of the best Tristan recordings. Some collectors prefer the pairing of Nilsson with the Canadian tenor Jon Vickers, available in "unofficial" recordings from performances in Vienna or Orange.

There are several DVD productions of the opera including Götz Friedrich's production at the Deutsche Oper in Berlin featuring the seasoned Wagnerians René Kollo and Dame Gwyneth Jones in the title roles. Deutsche Grammophon released a DVD of a Metropolitan Opera performance featuring Jane Eaglen and Ben Heppner, conducted by James Levine, in a production staged by Jürgen Rose, and a DVD of the 1995 Bayreuth Festival production with conductor Daniel Barenboim and featuring Waltraud Meier as Isolde and Siegfried Jerusalem as Tristan, staged by Heiner Mueller.

== Audio recordings ==
Year	cast: (Tristan, Isolde, Brangäne, King Marke, Kurwenal)	Conductor, Opera House and Orchestra	Label
1928	Gunnar Graarud, Nanny Larsen-Todsen, Anny Helm, Ivar Andresen, Rudolf Bockelmann	Karl Elmendorff, Bayreuth Festival Orchestra, Bayreuth Festival Chorus (abridged)	Naxos Historical, Cat: 8.110200-02
1935	Lauritz Melchior, Kirsten Flagstad, Karin Branzell, Ludwig Hofmann, Friedrich Schorr	Artur Bodanzky, Metropolitan Opera Orchestra, Metropolitan Opera Chorus	Immortal Performances, Cat: IPCD 1078–3
1936	Lauritz Melchior, Kirsten Flagstad, Sabine Kalter, Emanuel List, Herbert Janssen	Fritz Reiner, Royal Opera House Covent Garden Orchestra, Royal Opera House Covent Garden Chorus (Live recording and the sound is good considering the age of the recording)	VAI Audio: VAIA 1004-3, Naxos «Historical, Cat: 8.110068.70
1937	Lauritz Melchior, Kirsten Flagstad, Kerstin Thorborg, Ludwig Hofmann, Julius Huehn	Artur Bodanzky, Metropolitan Opera Orchestra, Metropolitan Opera Chorus	Immortal Performances, Cat: IPCD 1040–3
1937	Lauritz Melchior, Kirsten Flagstad, Margarete Klose, Sven Nilsson, Herbert Janssen	Thomas Beecham, Royal Opera House Covent Garden Orchestra, Royal Opera House Covent Garden Chorus, (Only part of the EMI recording is conducted by Beecham; the rest is conducted by Reiner)	EMI Classics, Cat: 64037
1943	Lauritz Melchior, Helen Traubel, Kerstin Thorborg, Alexander Kipnis, Julius Huehn	Erich Leinsdorf, Metropolitan Opera Orchestra, Metropolitan Opera Chorus	Naxos Historical, Cat: 8.110010-2
1943	Max Lorenz, Paula Buchner, Margarete Klose, Ludwig Hofmann, Jaro Prohaska	Robert Heger, Berlin State Opera Orchestra and Chorus	Preiser, Cat: 90243
1948	Set Svanholm, Kirsten Flagstad, Viorica Ursuleac, Ludwig Weber, Hans Hotter	Erich Kleiber, Buenos Aires Opera	Myto, Cat: H031
1950	Gunther Treptow, Helena Braun, Margarete Klose, Ferdinand Frantz, Paul Schöffler	Hans Knappertsbusch, Bavarian State Opera Orchestra	Orfeo, Cat: C355 943 D
1951	Max Lorenz, Gertrude Grob-Prandl, Elsa Cavelti, Sven Nilsson, Sigurd Björling	Victor de Sabata, Orchestra of La Scala Milan	Archipel, Cat: ARPCD 0027
1952	Ramón Vinay, Martha Mödl, Ira Malaniuk, Ludwig Weber, Hans Hotter	Herbert von Karajan, Bayreuth Festival Orchestra, Bayreuth Festival Chorus (Recording of a performance at the Bayreuth Festival)	Arkadia, Cat: CDHP 528.4 and other labels
1952	Ludwig Suthaus, Kirsten Flagstad (with Elisabeth Schwarzkopf providing some top notes in the Act II Love Duet), Blanche Thebom, Josef Greindl, Dietrich Fischer-Dieskau	Wilhelm Furtwängler, Philharmonia Orchestra, Royal Opera House Covent Garden Chorus	EMI Classics; Naxos Historical; Cat: 8.110321-24
1955	Set Svanholm, Astrid Varnay, Blanche Thebom, Jerome Hines, Josef Metternich	Rudolf Kempe, Metropolitan Opera Orchestra, Metropolitan Opera Chorus	Walhall, Cat: WLCD0135
1958	Wolfgang Windgassen, Birgit Nilsson, Grace Hoffman, Josef Greindl, Erik Saedén	Wolfgang Sawallisch, Bayreuth Festival Orchestra, Bayreuth Festival Chorus (Recording of a performance at the Bayreuth Festival)	Orfeo, Cat: 951 183 D
1959	Wolfgang Windgassen, Birgit Nilsson, Hilde Rössel-Majdan, Hans Hotter, Gustav Neidlinger	Herbert von Karajan, Orchestra and Chorus of the Teatro alla Scala	Golden Melodram, Cat: GM 1.0080
1961	Fritz Uhl, Birgit Nilsson, Regina Resnik, Arnold van Mill, Tom Krause	Georg Solti, Vienna Philharmonic Orchestra, Vienna Singverein	Decca, Cat: 470814
1966	Wolfgang Windgassen, Birgit Nilsson, Christa Ludwig, Martti Talvela, Eberhard Wächter	Karl Böhm, Bayreuth Festival Orchestra, Bayreuth Festival Chorus (Recording of a performance at the Bayreuth Festival, August)	Deutsche Grammophon, Cat: 449772
1971	Jon Vickers, Birgit Nilsson, Grace Hoffman, Franz Crass, Norman Mittelman	Horst Stein, Buenos Aires Teatro Colón Orchestra	VAI, Cat: VAIA 1178-3
1971-72	Jon Vickers, Helga Dernesch, Christa Ludwig, Karl Ridderbusch, Walter Berry	Herbert von Karajan, Berlin Philharmonic Orchestra, Berlin Deutsche Oper Chorus	EMI Classics, Cat: 69319
1976	Spas Wenkoff, Caterina Ligendza, Yvonne Minton, Karl Ridderbusch, Donald McIntyre	Carlos Kleiber, Bayreuth Festival Orchestra, Bayreuth Festival Chorus (Recording of a performance at the Bayreuth Festival)	Opera Depot, Cat: OD 10262-3
1980-81	John Mitchinson, Linda Esther Gray, Anne Wilkens, Gwynne Howell, Phillip Joll	Reginald Goodall, Chorus and Orchestra of Welsh National Opera	Decca, Cat: 443682
1981	Alberto Remedios, Linda Esther Gray, Felicity Palmer, John Tomlinson, Norman Bailey	Reginald Goodall, Chorus and Orchestra of English National Opera, Performance in English	Oriel Music Society, OMS 181
1981	Peter Hofmann, Hildegard Behrens, Yvonne Minton, Hans Sotin, Bernd Weikl	Leonard Bernstein, Bavarian Radio Symphony Orchestra, Bavarian Radio Symphony Chorus	Philips, Cat: 2PH5410-447
1980/82	René Kollo, Margaret Price, Brigitte Fassbaender, Kurt Moll, Dietrich Fischer-Dieskau	Carlos Kleiber, Leipzig Radio Chorus, Dresden Staatskapelle	Deutsche Grammophon, Cat: 403202
1995	Siegfried Jerusalem, Waltraud Meier, Marjana Lipovšek, Matti Salminen, Falk Struckmann	Daniel Barenboim, Berlin Philharmonic Orchestra, Berlin State Opera Chorus	Teldec, Cat: 94568
2003	Thomas Moser, Deborah Voigt, Petra Lang, Robert Holl, Peter Weber	Christian Thielemann, Vienna State Opera Orchestra, Vienna State Opera Chorus (Live)	Deutsche Grammophon, Cat: 474 974
2004	Plácido Domingo, Nina Stemme, Mihoko Fujimura, René Pape, Olaf Bär	Antonio Pappano, Royal Opera House Covent Garden Orchestra, Royal Opera House Covent Garden Chorus	EMI Classics, Cat: 5.58006
2012	Stephen Gould, Nina Stemme, Michelle Breedt, Kwangchul Youn, Johan Reuter	Marek Janowski, Rundfunk-Sinfonieorchester Berlin, Rundfunkchor Berlin	Pentatone, Cat: PTC5186404

== Video recordings ==
Year	Cast: (Tristan, Isolde, Brangäne, King Marke, Kurwenal)	Conductor, Opera House and Orchestra	Label
1967	Wolfgang Windgassen, Birgit Nilsson, Hertha Töpper, Hans Hotter, Frans Andersson	Pierre Boulez, NHK Symphony Orchestra, Osaka International Festival Choir (Directed by Wieland Wagner; recorded live [in black-and-white] at the Festival Hall, Osaka, on 10 April)	DVDs: TOL, Premiere, HO, Encore
1973	Jon Vickers, Birgit Nilsson, Ruth Hesse, Bengt Rundgren, Walter Berry	Karl Böhm, Orchestre National de l’ O.R.T.F., New Philharmonia Chorus (Directed by Nikolaus Lehnhoff; recorded live at the Théatre Antique d’Orange on 7 July)	DVD: Hardy Classic Video
1981	Peter Hofmann, Hildegard Behrens, Yvonne Minton, Hans Sotin, Bernd Weikl	Leonard Bernstein, Chor und Symphonieorchester des Bayerischen Rundfunks (Semi-staged concert version with set and costumes by Gerd Krauss; recorded live at the Herkulessaal, Munich, on 13 January, 27 April, and 10 November)	DVD and Blu-ray (NTSC, 4:3): Unitel
1983	René Kollo, Johanna Meier, Hanna Schwarz, Matti Salminen, Hermann Becht	Daniel Barenboim, Bayreuth Festival Orchestra and Chorus (Staged and directed by Jean-Pierre Ponnelle; recorded live at the Bayreuth Festival on 1–9 October)	DVD: Deutsche Grammophon
1993	René Kollo, Gwyneth Jones, Hanna Schwarz, Robert Lloyd, Gerd Feldhoff	Jiří Kout, Orchestra & Chorus of the Deutsche Oper Berlin (Staged and directed by Götz Friedrich; recorded live at NHK Hall, Tokyo, on 24 and 29 September)	DVD: TDK, Kultur, Arthaus Musik; Blu-ray: Arthaus Musik
1995	Siegfried Jerusalem, Waltraud Meier, Uta Priew, Matthias Hölle, Falk Struckmann	Daniel Barenboim, Bayreuth Festival Orchestra and Chorus (Staged by Heiner Müller; recorded live at the Bayreuth Festival 3–9 July)	DVD: Deutsche Grammophon
1998	Jon Frederic West, Waltraud Meier, Marjana Lipovšek, Kurt Moll, Bernd Weikl	Zubin Mehta, Bayerisches Staatsorchester, Chorus of the Bayerische Staatsoper (Stage director: Peter Konwitschny, recorded live at the Nationaltheater, Munich on 4 July)	DVD: Arthaus Musik
1999	Ben Heppner, Jane Eaglen, Katarina Dalayman, René Pape, Hans-Joachim Ketelsen	James Levine, Metropolitan Opera Orchestra and Chorus (Stage director: Dieter Dorn; TV director: Brian Large\; recorded live at the Metropolitan Opera House, New York City, 18 December)	SD video: Met Opera on Demand
2007	Robert Gambill, Nina Stemme, Katarina Karnéus, René Pape, Bo Skovhus	Jiří Bělohlávek, London Philharmonic Orchestra, Glyndebourne Festival Opera (Stage director: Nikolaus Lehnhoff; recorded live at the Glyndebourne Opera House on 1 and 6 August)	Blu-ray/DVD: Opus Arte
2007	Ian Storey; Waltraud Meier, Michelle DeYoung, Matti Salminen, Gerd Grochowski	Daniel Barenboim, Orchestra and Chorus of Teatro alla Scala (Director: Patrice Chéreau; recorded live on 7 December)	Blu-ray: Erato
2008	Robert Dean Smith, Deborah Voigt, Michelle DeYoung, Matti Salminen, Eike Wilm Schulte	James Levine, Metropolitan Opera Orchestra and Chorus (Stage director: Dieter Dorn; recorded live at the Metropolitan Opera House, New York City, on 22 March)	HD video: Met Opera on Demand.
2009	Robert Dean Smith, Iréne Theorin, Michelle Breedt, Robert Holl, Jukka Rasilainen	Peter Schneider, Bayreuth Festival Orchestra & Chorus; recorded live at the Bayreuth Festival on 9 August)	Blu-ray: Opus Arte
2016	Stuart Skelton, Nina Stemme, Ekaterina Gubanova, René Pape, Evgeny Nikitin	Simon Rattle, Metropolitan Opera Orchestra and Chorus (Stage director: Mariusz Treliński; TV director: Gary Halvorson; recorded live at the Metropolitan Opera House on 8 October)	HD video: Met Opera on Demand
2018	Andreas Schager, Anja Kampe, Ekaterina Gubanova, Stephen Milling, Boaz Daniel	Daniel Barenboim, Staatsoper Unter den Linden (Stage director: Dmitri Tcherniakov; recorded live in Berlin in April)	Blu-ray: Bel Air Classiques
2026	Michael Spyres, Lise Davidsen, Ekaterina Gubanova; Ryan Speedo Green, Tomasz Konieczny	Yannick Nézet-Séguin, Metropolitan Opera Orchestra & Chorus (Stage director: Yuval Sharon; recorded live, 21 March 2026)	HD video: Met Opera on Demand
