= Hans Hopf =

German operatic tenor (1916–1993)

Hans Hopf (August 2, 1916, Nuremberg – June 25, 1993, Munich) was a German operatic tenor, one of the leading heldentenors of the immediate postwar period. He sang Walther von Stolzing in the Bayreuth Festival's Die Meistersinger, in 1951 and again in 1952. He would also sing Siegfried at Bayreuth from 1960–1963.

He studied in Munich with Paul Bender, and made his stage debut with a touring opera ensemble, as Pinkerton, in 1936. He then sang in Augsburg (1939–42), Dresden (1942–43), and Oslo (1943–44). He joined the Berlin State Opera in 1946, and the Munich State Opera, in 1949. He appeared in Bayreuth in 1951, as Walther, returning as Siegmund, Siegfried (in 1960), Tannhäuser, and Parsifal (in 1952). At Bayreuth in 1951 he took part in a performance of Beethoven's 9th Symphony conducted by Wilhelm Furtwängler. He sang Max at the Salzburg Festival in 1954. He made guest appearances in Milan, London, New York, and Buenos Aires. He sang both Siegfrieds in the early 1960s at Bayreuth, the Met, and elsewhere, recording Tannhäuser twice in 1960.

A singer with a sturdy and reliable voice, Hopf also won acclaim in a number of non-Wagnerian operas notably Verdi's Otello, and the Emperor in Die Frau ohne Schatten.

== Selected recordings ==
- Der Freischütz – Hans Hopf, Elisabeth Grümmer, Rita Streich, Alfred Poell, Kurt Böhme – Cologne Radio Chorus and Orchestra, Erich Kleiber – Cantus Classic (1955)
- Il trovatore – Hans Hopf, Christel Goltz, Ira Malaniuk, Josef Metternich, Wilhelm Schirp – Cologne Radio Chorus and Orchestra, Ferenc Fricsay – Cantus Classic (sung in German, 1953)
- Vespri siciliani – Hilde Zadek, Hans Hopf, Dietrich Fischer-Dieskau, Gottlob Frick – Cologne Radio Chorus and Orchestra, Mario Rossi – Cantus Classic (sung in German, 1955)
- Otello – Hans Hopf, Annelies Kupper, Ferdinand Frantz – Munich Radio Chorus and Orchestra, Eugen Jochum – Wallhall Eternity (sung in German, 1955)
- Tosca – Leonie Rysanek, Hans Hopf, Josef Metternich – Bavarian Radio Chorus and Orchestra, Richard Kraus – Cantus Classic (sung in German, 1953)
- Turandot – Christel Goltz, Hans Hopf, Teresa Stich-Randall, Wilhelm Schirp – Cologne Radio Chorus and Orchestra, Georg Solti – Cantus Classic (sung in German, 1956)

== Sources ==
- Grove Music Online, Harold Rosenthal, May 2008.
