= Antigonae =

1949 opera by Carl Orff

- Opera by Carl Orff
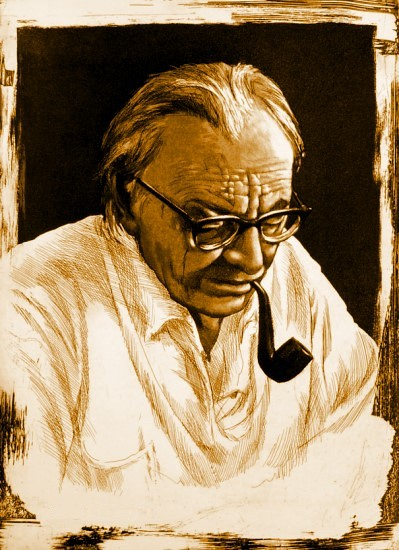
- The composer, aquatint etching
- Language: German
- Based on: Friedrich Hölderlin's translation of Antigone by Sophocles
- Premiere: 9 August 1949; Salzburg Festival

Antigonae (Antigone), written by Carl Orff, was first presented on 9 August 1949 under the direction of Ferenc Fricsay in the Felsenreitschule, Salzburg, Austria, as part of the Salzburg Festival. Antigonae is in Orff's words a "musical setting" for the Greek tragedy of the same name by Sophocles. However, it functions as an opera.

The opera is a line-by-line setting of the German translation of Sophocles' play by Friedrich Hölderlin. However, Orff did not treat Hölderlin's translation of the play as a traditional opera libretto, but rather as the basis for a "musical transformation" of the tragic language of the drama of Ancient Greece. Sophocles's play was written in 442 BC, and Hölderlin's 1804 translation copies faithfully the mood and movement of Greek tragedy.

== Roles ==
Roles, voice types, premiere cast
| Role | Voice type | Premiere cast, 9 August 1949 Conductor: Ferenc Fricsay |
|---|---|---|
| Antigonae | mezzo-soprano | Res Fischer |
| A messenger | bass | Josef Greindl |
| A guard | tenor | Helmut Krebs |
| Eurydice | soprano | Hilde Zadek |
| Haemon | tenor | Lorenz Fehenberger |
| Ismene | contralto | Maria von Ilosvay |
| Kreon | baritone | Hermann Uhde |
| Tiresias | tenor | Ernst Haefliger |

== Synopsis ==
The opera begins in the early morning following a battle in Thebes between the armies of the two sons of Oedipus: Eteocles and Polynices. King Kreon, who ascended the throne of Thebes after both brothers were killed in battle, decrees that Polynices is not to be buried. Antigonae, his sister, defies the order, but is caught. Kreon decrees that she be buried alive in spite of the fact that she is betrothed to his son, Haemon. The gods, through the blind prophet Tiresias, express their disapproval of Kreon's decision, which convinces him to rescind his order, and he goes to bury Polynices. However, Antigonae has already hanged herself rather than be buried alive. When Kreon arrives at the tomb where she was to be interred, his son, Haemon, attacks him and then kills himself. Finally, when Kreon's wife, Eurydice, is informed of Haemon's and Antigonae's death she, too, takes her own life. At the end of the play, and the opera, Kreon is the only principal left alive.

== Music ==
Orff's musical setting of Hölderlin's Sophocles translation from 1804 created a novel form of musical theatre in which the poetic text itself becomes musicalized through the declamation of the singing voices. An extraordinary reduction of the structures of the pitch domain, in connection with the predominance of rhythmic patterns, has been described as an essential feature of Orff's late style. Especially the large choruses, which exhibit a pronounced tendency to build up large soundscapes from highly individual timbres, demonstrate the composer's method of thinking in constellations of basic pitches without veritable chord syntax. Orff's renunciation of the grammar of harmonic tonality allowed the composer, as the musical equivalent of Hölderlin's archaic language, to turn the declamation of the singing voices itself into the vehicle for the dramatic action. As Pietro Massa has been able to show, an intensive exchange of ideas with the classical philologist Wolfgang Schadewaldt, the musicologist Thrasybulos Georgiades and the stage director Wieland Wagner, who had originally been selected as director for the world premieres of Oedipus der Tyrann and Prometheus by the composer, accompanied the genesis of Orff's operas on Greek drama.

Concentrating on an ensemble of percussion instruments with and without definite pitches, originally certainly born out of the fascination that the orchestra's only still evolving group exercised on 20th-century composers, also appears to be a veritable patent solution for a composer who is interested in creating pitch organizations had never been a central concern. The idea of a differentiated cooperation based on the division of musical functions, which has distinguished the orchestra of Western art music that has grown organically over the centuries, appears in the orchestra of Orff's operas on Hölderlin’s translations from Sophokles transposed on instrument constellations that were previously unknown to European art music. In the score of Antigonae, six grand pianos and a group of xylophones, which were mostly given only marginal tasks in the traditional orchestra, take on the role that the group of strings had in the orchestration of Viennese classical music. On the other hand, traditional instruments of the European orchestral tradition – such as flutes, oboes, trumpets and double basses – become entrusted in Antigonae and Oedipus der Tyrann with functions that had been reserved to rare percussion instruments in the orchestra of the 19th century: As special timbres with an almost exotic sound appeal, they appear reserved for the turning points of the work's dramaturgical structure.

In the history of 20th-century music, Orff's operas on Greek antiquity constitute an extraordinarily original and highly personal pathway for the avantgarde music theatre after 1950. In the course of the last two decades, Orff's Hölderlin operas have received more attention than in the years before 2000, not least because of pronounced similarities between Orff's musical language and more recent tendencies of Minimal Music. Of his three operas on drama from Greek antiquity, especially Antigonae has been able to assert itself in the repertoire, since Arthur Honegger 's opera Antigone (Brussels, Théâtre de la Monnaie, 1927), despite its libretto by Jean Cocteau, has not been able to enter the standard operatic repertory.

== Instrumentation ==
According to the score, which is published by Schott Music, Antigonae is scored for an unusual orchestra with a strong percussion section. This orchestra is to be well screened from the audience when the opera is performed.

- 6 flutes all doubling piccolos
- 6 oboes with which 3 double cor anglais
- 6 trumpets with mutes
- 4 harps
- 6 grand pianos with 2 players each*
- 9 contrabasses

(*) At several points, the strings are struck with various items, including wooden drum sticks on the higher strings, timpani sticks on the lower strings, and also a plectrum.

The percussion section requires 10 to 15 players to perform on the following instruments:

- 7–8 timpani (including a drum on high A)
- lithophone (soprano-range)
- 2–3 xylophones
- 10 "trough xylophones" (2 soprano-xylophones, 6 tenor-xylophones, 2 bass-xylophones)*
- 1 small wood drum
- 1 large African slit-drum
- 2 high bells in D(5) and E(5)
- 3 glockenspiel (2 high-range)
- 4 pairs of antique cymbals
- 3 suspended cymbals (Turkish)
- 3 pairs of crash cymbals (Turkish)
- Small anvil
- 3 triangles
- 2 bass drums
- 6 tambourines
- 6 pairs of castanets
- 10 large Javanese gongs pitched in G(1), C(2), D(2), E(2), G(2), A(3), C(3), D(3), E(3) and F(3)

(*) These are Orff Schulwerk instruments.

For the percussion, Carl Orff insisted on using the right kind of instruments. The two bells must be of typical shape; tubular bells and "plate" bells are not acceptable. The castanets must be of the type without handles, e.g. those only connected together via a string.

Carl Orff also gave extensive performance directions that should be taken into account at performances. For instance, some of the 12 pianists switch to other pianos at several sections. In another place, the entire trumpet section is required to perform some passages backstage before returning to the orchestra.

== Recordings ==
=== Audio ===
- Res Fischer, Hilde Zadek, Benno Kusche, Hermann Uhde, Helmut Krebs, Lorenz Fehenberger, Ernst Haefliger, Josef Greindl; Vienna Philharmonic, conductor: Ferenc Fricsay. World premiere 1949. Stradivarius.
- Martha Mödl, Grace Hoffman, Josef Traxel, Gerhard Stolze, Fritz Wunderlich, Hermann Uhde; Württembergische Staatsoper, conductor: Ferdinand Leitner, Walhall Eternity Series 1956
- Christel Goltz, Irmgard Barth, Benno Kusche, Hermann Uhde, Paul Kuën, Karl Ostertag; Bavarian State Orchestra, conductor: Sir Georg Solti. Orfeo 1951.
- Martha Mödl, Carlos Alexander, Paul Kuën, Fritz Uhl, Josef Traxel, Kurt Böhme; Bavarian Radio Symphony Orchestra, conductor: Wolfgang Sawallisch. 1958.
- Inge Borkh, Carlos Alexander, Gerhard Stolze, Fritz Uhl, Ernst Haefliger, Kim Borg; Bavarian Radio Symphony Orchestra, conductor: Ferdinand Leitner. Deutsche Grammophon 1961.

=== Video ===
- Katrin Gerstenberger, Andreas Daum, Markus Durst, Sven Ehrke, Mark Adler, Thomas Mehnert; Staatstheater Darmstadt; stage director: John Dew; conductor: Stefan Blunier. WERGO 2010.
