= Ira Malaniuk =

Austrian opera singer

- Born: January 29, 1919
- Died: February 25, 2009 (aged 90); Zirl, Austria
- Occupations: Mezzo-soprano; teacher

Ira Malaniuk (Ukrainian: Ірина Маланюк; Iryna Malanyuk; 29 January 1919 – 25 February 2009) was an Austrian operatic Mezzo-soprano of Ukrainian descent. She sang a wide range of roles, from Mozart to contemporary works.

== Life ==
Malaniuk was born in Stanyslaviv. She studied first in Lviv with Adam Didur, and later in Vienna with Anna Bahr-Mildenburg. She made her stage debut in Graz in 1945. She joined the Zurich Opera in 1947, where she took part in the creation of Willy Burkhard's Die schwarze Spinne and sang in the local premiere of Stravinsky's The Rake's Progress.

In 1952, she began appearing at the Munich State Opera and the Vienna State Opera, her roles there included; Gluck's Orfeo, Verdi's Lady Macbeth, and Judith in Béla Bartók's Bluebeard's Castle.

Malaniuk appeared at La Scala in Milan, in the Ring Cycle under Wilhelm Furtwängler. She also made guest appearances at the Royal Opera House in London, the Paris Opéra, the Monte Carlo Opera, at the Salzburg Festival, the Bayreuth Festival in roles such as Magdalene, Fricka, Brangäne, Waltraute, Adelaide and Marina.

Malaniuk also enjoyed success in Italian roles such as Dorabella, Vittelia, Azucena, Amneris, she was also active in concert and oratorios, often singing the alto parts in Beethoven's Ninth Symphony and Mozart's Requiem.

Malaniuk retired from the stage in 1971, and taught at the Graz Music Conservatory. She died, aged 90, at Zirl, Tyrol (Austria).

== Selected recordings ==
- 1953 – Wagner – Der Ring des Nibelungen – Ira Malaniuk sings Fricka, Waltraute and Second Norn at Bayreuth with Clemens Krauss
- 1953 – Mozart – Così fan tutte – Suzanne Danco, Ira Malanuik, Rudolf Schock, Horst Gunter, Edith Oravez, Benno Kusche – Hamburg Radio Chorus and Orchestra, Hans Schmidt-Isserstedt – Cantus Classics (sung in German)
- 1953 – Verdi – Der Troubadour – Christel Goltz, Hans Hopf, Ira Malaniuk, Josef Metternich, Wilhelm Schirp – Cologne Radio Chorus and Orchestra, Ferenc Fricsay – Cantus Classics (sung in German)
- 1955 – Mozart – La clemenza di Tito – Nicolai Gedda, Hilde Zadek, Ilse Wallerstein, Ira Malaniuk, Peter Offermanns, Gerhard Groschel – Cologne Radio Chorus and Orchestra, Joseph Keilberth – Cantus Classics (sung in Italian)
- 1958 – Verdi – Aida – Anna de Cavalieri (Aida e Sacerdotessa), Ira Malaniuk (Amneris), Aldo Bertocci (Radames), Scipio Colombo (Amonasro), Paolo Dari (Ramfis), Ugo Trama Il Re) Walter Bertelli (Un messaggero) – Orchestra e Coro dell'Opera di Roma, Ernesto Barbini conductor – Orpheus (sung in Italian)
