= Lorenz Fehenberger =

German opera singer

Lorenz Fehenberger (24 August 1912 – 29 July 1984) was a German operatic tenor, particularly associated with the German and Italian repertories.

Fehenberger was born in Oberweidach, Upper Bavaria, and began singing as a boy in a church choir, later studying voice with Elisabeth Wolff in Munich. He made his stage debut in Graz, as the Italian singer in Der Rosenkavalier, in 1939. He then sang at the Staatsoper Dresden from 1941 to 1945, and made his debut at the Munich State Opera in 1946. He sang regularly at the Salzburg Festival between 1949 and 1962, where he created the role of Haemon in Carl Orff's Antigone. He also sang at the Vienna State Opera (1951–52).

He made guest appearances in Italy, Switzerland, Belgium, Holland, also appearing at the Teatro Colón in Buenos Aires (1951), and the Royal Opera House in London (1953).

Fehenberger was much admired as Lohengrin and Walther, but also gained considerable acclaim in Italian roles such as Duke of Mantua, Riccardo, Alvaro, Radames, Pinkerton, Cavaradossi, as well as Bizet's Don Jose. He was also active as a recitalist, often appearing in oratorio by Bach, Handel, and Haydn. He died in Munich at age 71.

== Selected recordings ==
- Lohengrin – Lorenz Fehenberger, Annelies Kupper, Helena Braun, Ferdinand Frantz, Otto Von Rohr – Bavarian Radio Chorus and Orchestra, Eugen Jochum (Conductor) – Deutsche Grammophon (1953)
- Ein Maskenball – Lorenz Fehenberger, Walburga Wagner, Dietrich Fischer-Dieskau, Martha Mödl, Anny Schlemm – with the Cologne Radio Symphony Orchestra and the Cologne Radio Choir, Fritz Busch (Conductor) – Gala (1951) (Cat. 100.509)
