= Annelies Kupper =

German operatic soprano (1906–1987)

Annelies Kupper (21 July 1906 – 8 December 1987), was a German operatic soprano, particularly associated with Mozart and the German repertory.

Kupper was born at Glatz (now Kłodzko) in Lower Silesia. She studied in Breslau and was a music teacher there before making her operatic debut in 1935. She then appeared in Schwerin (1937–38), Weimar (1938–40), Hamburg (1940–46), Munich (1946–61). She sang Eva in Die Meistersinger at the Bayreuth festival, in 1944, and returned as Elsa in Lohengrin in 1960. She created Danae in Richard Strauss's Die Liebe der Danae at the Salzburg festival, in 1952.

Kupper was especially admired as Countess Almaviva, in addition to Wagner and Strauss roles, she also gained considerable acclaim as Aida and Desdemona (in Otello). A sensitive and warm-voiced singer, she retired in 1961, and taught at the Music Conservatory in Munich. She died in Munich at age 81.

== Selected recordings ==
- Lohengrin – Lorenz Fehenberger, Annelies Kupper, Helena Braun, Ferdinand Frantz, Otto Von Rohr – Bavarian Radio Chorus and Orchestra, Eugen Jochum – Deutsche Grammophon (1953)
- Aida – Annelies Kupper, Max Lorenz, Margarete Klose, Rudolf Gonszar, Otto Von Rohr – Frankfurt Radio Chorus and Orchestra, Kurt Schroder – Walhall Eternity (1952) sung in German

== Sources ==
- Le guide de l'opéra, R.Mancini & J.J.Rouveroux, (Fayard, 1986), ISBN 2-213-01563-5
