= Anny Helm =

Austrian opera singer

Anny Helm, later also Anny Helm-Sbisà (20 July 1903 – 21 August 1993), was an Austrian operatic soprano. She was a member of the ensemble at the Stadttheater Magdeburg and at the Berlin State Opera and gave guest performances at numerous German theatres and at the Bayreuth Festival, in Vienna, Paris, London, Brussels and Buenos Aires as well as at all the major opera houses in Italy. She was married to Giuseppe Sbisà, the director of the Teatro Lirico Giuseppe Verdi in Trieste.

== Life and career ==
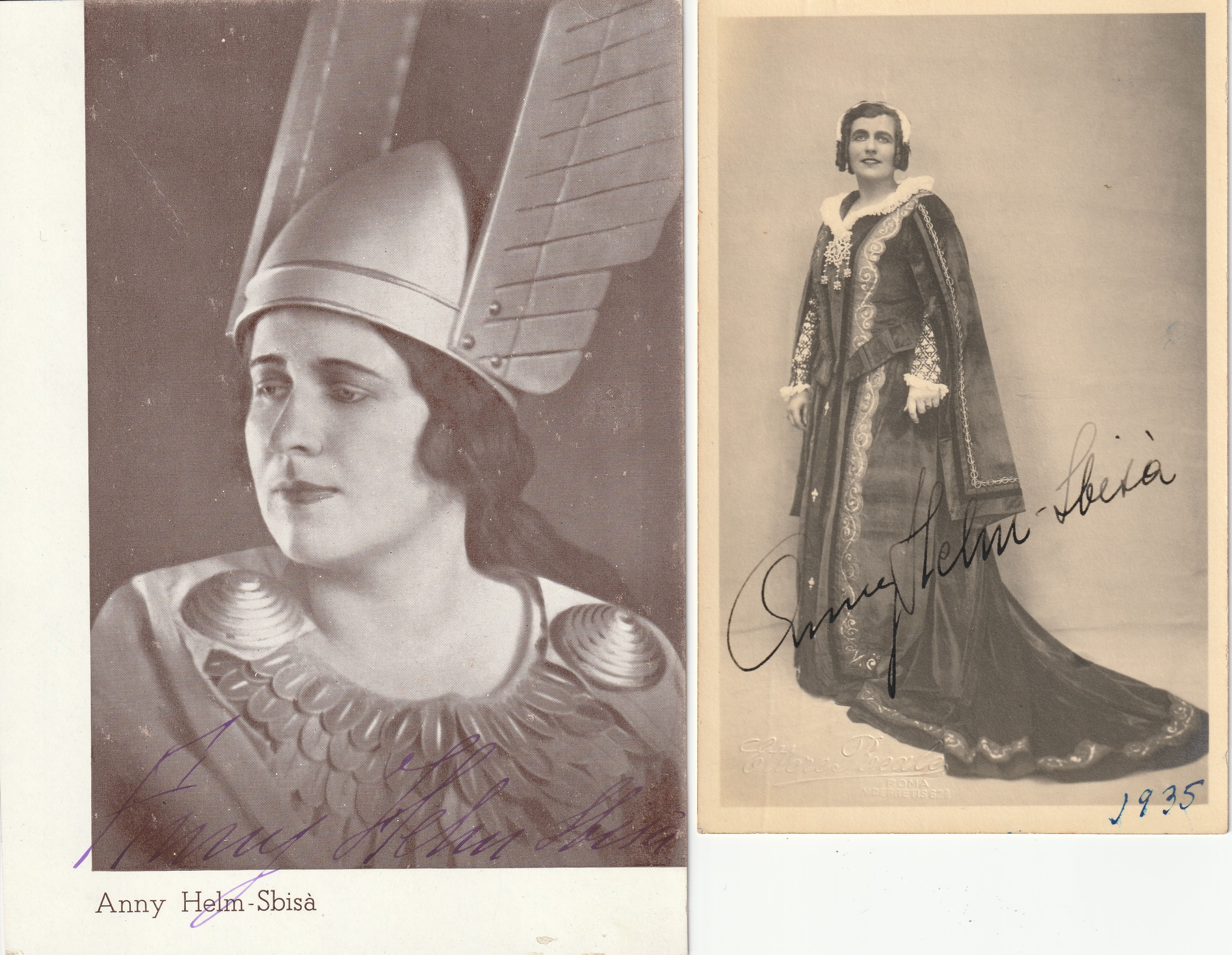
Anny Helm-Sbisà in Buenos Aires, Argentina

Anny Helm was born in Vienna on 20 July 1903. She studied singing in Vienna with the sopranos Marie Gutheil-Schoder and Gertrud Förstel, and in Berlin with Ernst Grenzebach. She made her professional debutat the Stadttheater Magdeburg in 1924; serving as a resident principal artist at that theatre through 1926. She next became a member of the Berlin State Opera (BSO). She was a member there from 1926 to 1933. She was concurrently a regular performer in annual appearances at the Bayreuth Festival from 1927 to 1931, and appeared as a guest artist at the New German Theatre in Prague from 1931 ro 1933. At Bayreuth she performed the roles of Brangäne in Tristan und Isolde and Venus in Tannhäuser; notably recording the part of Brangäne on disc in 1928.

Helm was known on the stage as Anny Helm-Sbisà after her marriage to Giuseppe Sbisà, the director of the Trieste Opera, in 1933. She sang Venus at the Paris Opera (1931), the Teatro Colón in Buenos Aires (1936),, and at the Royal Opera House, Covent Garden (1939). In 1933 she appeared as a guest at the Grand Théâtre de Genève, and in 1934 she portrayed the title role in La Gioconda at the Arena di Verona Festival. In 1933-1934 she performed in the complete Ring Cycle at La Monnaie in Brussels. In the 1934-1935 season she performed at La Scala as Brünnhilde in Die Walküre.

Other opera houses she performed in as a guest included the Bavarian State Opera, the Hamburg State Opera, and the Teatro dell'Opera di Roma. In 1944 she was a guest at the Vienna State Opera, and in 1949 she returned for further performances at La Monnaie. She retired and worked as a voice teacher in Vienna.

She died in Bibione on 21 August 1993.

=== Repertoire ===
Beethoven:

- Leonore in Fidelio

Gluck:

- Alceste in Alceste

Janáček:

- Káťa in Káťa Kabanová

Mascagni:

- Santuzza in Cavalleria rusticana

Mozart:

- Donna Anna in Don Giovanni

Ponchielli:

- Gioconda in La Gioconda

Puccini:

- Turandot in Turandot

Richard Strauss:

- Chrysothemis and Elektra in Elektra

Wagner:

- Brangäne and Isolde in Tristan und Isolde
- Fricka in Das Rheingold
- Senta in The Flying Dutchman
- Venus in Tannhäuser
- Brünnhilde in Die Walküre, Siegfried and Götterdämmerung
- Kundry in Parsifal

Wolf-Ferrari:

- Maliella in I gioielli della Madonna

== Recording ==
The 1928 Bayreuth Tristan-and-Isolde cast (Gunnar Graarud and Nanny Larsén-Todsen in the title roles, Helm as Brangäne, Karl Elmendorff at the pulpit) was largely recorded by Columbia. She also took part in the recording of the Bayreuth Parsifal of 1927/28, conducted by Karl Muck.
