= Nanny Larsén-Todsen =

Swedish soprano (1884–1982)

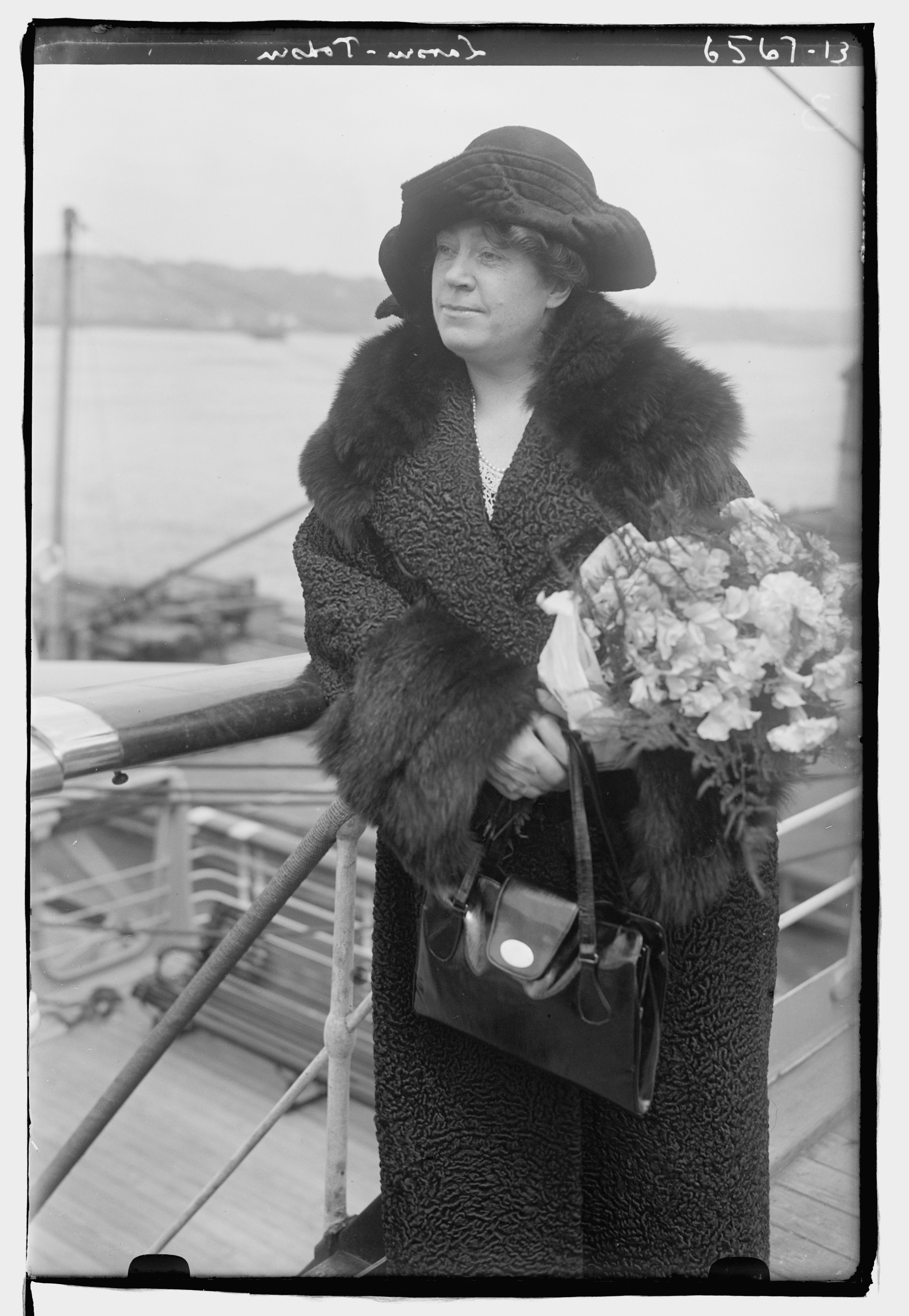
Larsén-Todsen

Nanny Larsén-Todsen (2 August 1884 – 26 May 1982) was a Swedish dramatic soprano, renowned for her performances in works by Richard Wagner and counted as one of the most notable Wagnerian sopranos of the 20th-century, from the generation before Frida Leider and Kirsten Flagstad. She was particularly popular at the Bayreuth Festival as Brunnhilde and Isolde.

== Biography ==
She was a principal soprano at the Royal Swedish Opera from 1906 through 1923. She then sang at La Scala 1923–24, the Metropolitan Opera 1925–27, and Bayreuth in 1927–31, she also made guest appearances at most of the major European opera houses. Her last appearance was at the Paris Opera in 1937, as Isolde.

She received Litteris et Artibus in 1920, was elected into the Royal Swedish Academy of Music in 1924, and made Hovsångerska in 1925.

Living in Stockholm following her retirement from the stage, Larsén-Todsen taught singing.

== Recordings ==
- 1928: Richard Wagner: Tristan und Isolde (abridged); Nanny Larsen-Todsen (as Isolde), with Anny Helm (Brangäne), Gunnar Graarud (Tristan), Rudolf Bockelmann (Kurwenal], Ivar Andrésen (König Marke), Joachim Sattler (Melot), Gustav Rödin (ein junger Seemann) and Hans Beer (Ein Hirt). Bayreuth Festival Orchestra & Chorus, conducted by Karl Elmendorff. Originally issued by the Columbia Graphophone Company in 1929 on 20 discs (Columbia L 2187–206), this was recorded (without audience) in the Bayreuth Festspielhaus with the approval of Siegfried Wagner during the late summer of 1928.

There were several CD reissues: Naxos CD 8.110200-02 (3 CDs) | Grammofono 2000 AB 78925-26 (2 CDs) | Preiser PSR 90383 (2 CDs)
