= Helena Braun =

German soprano (1903–1990)

- Braun, c. 1950
- Born: 20 March 1903; Düsseldorf, Prussia, German Empire
- Died: 2 September 1990 (aged 87); Sonthofen, Bavaria, Germany
- Occupation: Operatic soprano
- Years active: 1928–1959
- Organisation(s): Bavarian State Opera; Vienna State Opera
- Spouse: Ferdinand Frantz

Helena Braun (20 March 1903 – 2 September 1990) was a German dramatic soprano. She made her stage debut in Mozart's Le nozze di Figaro in 1928 and joined the Vienna State Opera and the Bavarian State Opera in 1939 and 1940, respectively. She became known for Wagnerian roles such as Brünnhilde in Der Ring des Nibelungen and Ortrud in Lohengrin.

Braun performed at the Metropolitan Opera for a brief period in 1949–1950 with her husband, Ferdinand Frantz, as a temporary replacement for Helen Traubel who had laryngitis. She continued singing in Munich in the 1950s with several international guest performances, and retired from opera after Frantz's death in 1959.

== Early life ==
Helena Braun was born in Düsseldorf on 20 March 1903. She was initially trained as a mezzo-soprano and studied with Heinrich van Helden, a local baritone in Düsseldorf. Her early studies included roles such as the title character of Bizet's Carmen and Azucena from Verdi's Il trovatore. She also trained in Cologne and in Vienna with Hermann Gallos and Hans Duhan.

== Career ==
Braun's stage debut was in Mozart's Le nozze di Figaro at the Theater Koblenz in 1928. She performed at several smaller theatres over the next decade, joining the Bielefeld Opera in 1930, the Opernhaus Wuppertal in 1932, and the Wiesbaden Opera in 1933. During this time she switched to dramatic soprano roles. In 1939, she performed at the Zoppot Festspiele as Brünnhilde in Wagner's Der Ring des Nibelungen. She was a member of the Vienna State Opera from 1939 to 1949, and of the Bavarian State Opera from 1940 until her retirement in 1959.

She created the title role of Rudolf Wagner-Régeny's Johanna Balk in Vienna on 4 April 1941. The opera was met with a hostile public response for its perceived anti-fascist themes and apparent influence of the German-Jewish composer Kurt Weill, as well as its unconventional musical elements. However, the German musicologist Dieter Härtwig later praised the expressiveness of Braun's performances. That same year she returned to the Zoppot Festspiele as Ortrud in Wagner's Lohengrin. She sang at the 1941 and 1942 Salzburg Festivals as Donna Anna in Mozart's Don Giovanni and as the Countess in Figaro, respectively. In reviews of the 1942 recording, critics later characterized Braun as a "better-than-average" Countess but ranked her performance below those of Elisabeth Schwarzkopf, Lisa Della Casa, and Kiri Te Kanawa.

Braun was married to the German bass-baritone Ferdinand Frantz and accompanied him to New York City "just for the trip" when he sang with the Metropolitan Opera. On 21 December 1949, a week after Frantz's debut at the Met, Braun made her own Met debut when she assumed the role of Brünnhilde in Die Walküre on four hours' notice after Helen Traubel became ill with laryngitis. Astrid Varnay, who was usually Traubel's replacement, was also unavailable. Howard Taubman of The New York Times reported that the audience members, who were initially disappointed by Traubel's absence, were heartened by Braun's performance opposite Frantz, who sang as Wotan. Taubman applauded Braun's confident performance and concluded: "Here was a Brünnhilde who acted and sang as if she belonged in a performance of a great music-drama in a great opera house." The success of her performance earned her a two-month contract with the Met to continue singing as Brünnhilde and other Wagnerian roles.

She continued performing with the Bavarian State Opera in the 1950s. Her guest performances included the Palais Garnier in 1950, the Teatro dell'Opera di Roma in 1952 as Brünnhilde, and the Opéra de Monte-Carlo in 1953 as Ortrud. Other Wagnerian roles in her repertoire were Kundry in Parsifal, Isolde in Tristan und Isolde, and Venus in Tannhäuser. Braun's roles dwindled after 1956 when she was replaced as Brünnhilde by Birgit Nilsson in Munich; Frantz protested the replacement by refusing to sing as Wotan.

== Retirement ==
Braun retired from the opera after Frantz's death in 1959. She gave a farewell performance as Ortrud in Munich that year. In her later life, she moved several times and lived in Hohenpeißenberg, Wiesbaden, Sulzberg (in Oberallgäu), and Sonthofen. Braun died at her home in Sonthofen on 2 September 1990, at the age of 87.

== Recordings ==
The Opera Quarterly named Braun among a group of "major singers heard on disc only sporadically". In addition to the full-length opera recordings in the following list, she also recorded selections from Wagner's Götterdämmerung, Der fliegende Holländer, and Parsifal, Gluck's Iphigénie en Aulide, and Borodin's Prince Igor.

Year	Role	Other cast	Conductor Opera house and orchestra	Label	Ref.
1942	Mozart; Le nozze di Figaro (The Countess)	Hans Hotter; Erich Kunz; Irma Beilke; Gerda Sommerschuh; Gustav Neidlinger; Res Fischer; Josef Witt	Clemens Krauss; Vienna Philharmonic, Konzertvereinigung Wiener Staatsopernchor; Recorded at the 1942 Salzburg Festival	Preiser Records	
1949	Wagner; Die Walküre (Brünnhilde)	Hilde Konetzni; Rosette Anday; Günther Treptow; Ferdinand Frantz; Herbert Alsen	Rudolf Moralt; Vienna Symphony	Myto Records	
1950	Wagner; Tristan und Isolde (Isolde)	Günther Treptow; Margarete Klose; Paul Schöffler	Hans Knappertsbusch; Bavarian State Opera	Orfeo	
1952	Wagner; Lohengrin (Ortrud)	Lorenz Fehrenberger; Annelies Kupper; Ferdinand Frantz	Eugen Jochum; Bavarian Radio Symphony Orchestra	Preiser Records	
1952	Wagner; Tristan und Isolde (Isolde)	Günther Treptow; Ferdinand Frantz; Rudolf Großmann; Margarete Klose	Erich Kleiber; Bavarian State Opera	Myto Records	
