= Ria Ginster =

German soprano (1898–1985)

- Born: 15 April 1898; Frankfurt, Hesse, Germany
- Died: 11 May 1985 (aged 87); Zürich, Switzerland
- Education: Hoch Conservatory; Berlin University of the Arts
- Occupations: Classical soprano; Academic teacher

Ria Ginster (15 April 1898 – 11 May 1985) was a German soprano who appeared mainly in recital and concert, including international tours. She was an academic voice teacher at the Zürich Conservatory, and gave master classes internationally, including at the Mozarteum, in Philadelphia and in New York.

== Life and career ==
Born in Frankfurt, Ginster was the daughter of the conductor Peter Ginster. She attended the Lyzeum and learned violin, appearing in public at age 13. From 1916 she studied singing at the Hoch Conservatory in Frankfurt. She studied further at the Berlin University of the Arts with Louis Bachner, obtaining the Staatsexamen. From 1923 she performed as a lied singer primarily. Opera arias also belonged to her repertoire, but she rarely appeared on stage. She performed operatic roles for the broadcaster Hessischer Rundfunk, including Melisande in Debussy's Pelléas et Mélisande and the title role in Puccini's Suor Angelica.

Ginster gave concerts in Austria, Belgium, France, Finland, Holland, Italy, Norway, Sweden and Switzerland, and from 1934 also in the U.S. and Canada. In London, she was the soprano soloist in Handel's Messiah, conducted by Thomas Beecham. In 1935, she performed at Carnegie Hall in New York City. In 1936 and 1941, she sang premieres of lieder by Othmar Schoeck. She performed the soprano solo in Beethoven's Ninth Symphony at the 1937 Salzburg Festival. Wilhelm Furtwängler conducted the gala concert, with Rosette Anday, Helge Rosvaenge and Herbert Alsen as soloists. The same year, she was the soprano soloist, alongside Hans Hotter, in A German Requiem by Johannes Brahms, conducted by Herbert von Karajan.

The program of a recital at Wigmore Hall in London on 7 February 1934 with pianist George Reeves began with Italian arias, followed by groups of songs by Schubert, Brahms, Debussy and Hugo Wolf. In a recital at Grotrian Hall in London on 11 January 1938, with Reeves and clarinetist Charles Draper, she sang works by Mozart ("Das Veilchen"), Brahms ("Meine Liebe ist grün"), Schubert ("The Shepherd on the Rock"), Hans Pfitzner, and Reger ("Mariae Wiegenlied").

In 1938, Ginster was appointed professor and head of the concert class at the Zurich University of the Arts, with students including Hilde Zadek. She taught at Carnegie Tech as head of the voice department when after leaving Germany under Hitler's rule saying that she preferred to "be small and free." She also taught from 1947 in New York. From 1949 to 1956, she gave master classes at the Mozarteum.

Ginster died in Zürich on 11 May 1985.

== Recordings ==
Ginster recorded especially lieder. She took part in a project to record all lieder by Hugo Wolf, which ran from 1931 to 1938, but remained uncompleted. Songs mostly by Schubert, but also Mozart, Schumann (Frauenliebe), Brahms, Debussy and Schoeck, were re-issued in 1997, titled The Art of Ria Ginster.

In 1939, she was the soprano soloist in a recording of Rossini's Petite messe solennelle, with John Barbirolli conducting the Westminster Choir and the New York Philharmonic, and soloists Bruna Castagna, Charles Kullman and Leonard Warren.
