= Artur Bodanzky =

American conductor (1877–1939)

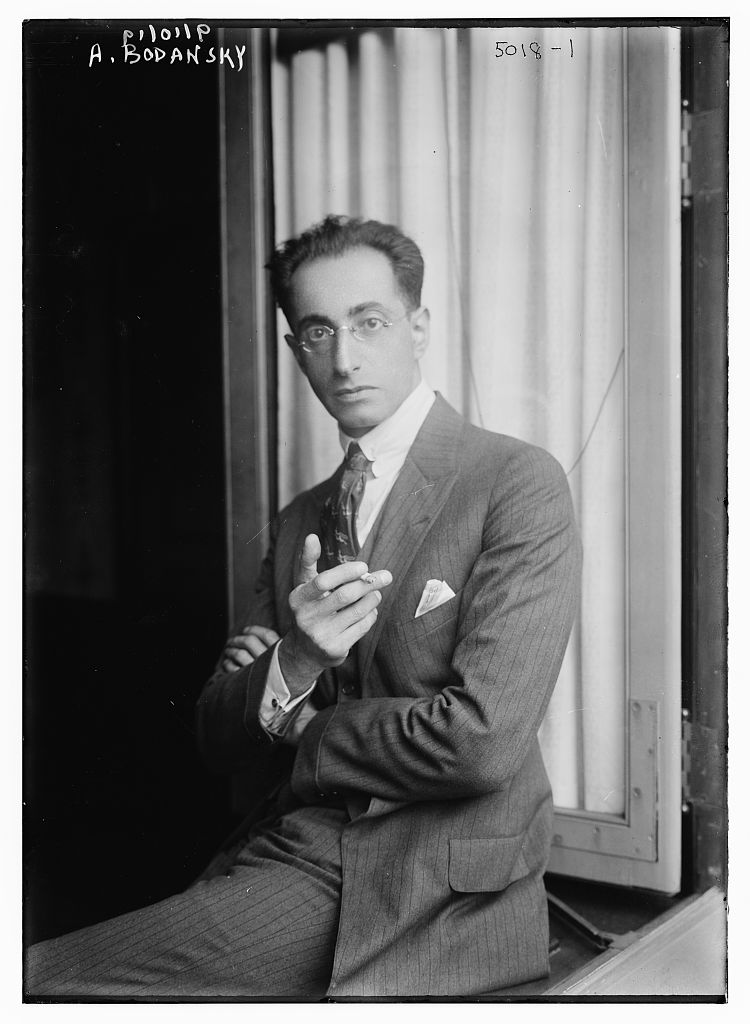
- Bodanzky in 1919
- Born: 16 December 1877; Vienna, Austria (country)
- Died: 23 November 1939 (aged 61); New York City, U.S.
- Citizenship: Austrian-American
- Education: Studied violin and composition
- Occupation: Conductor
- Employer: Metropolitan Opera
- Known for: Wagner opera interpretations
- Relatives: Robert Bodanzky (brother)

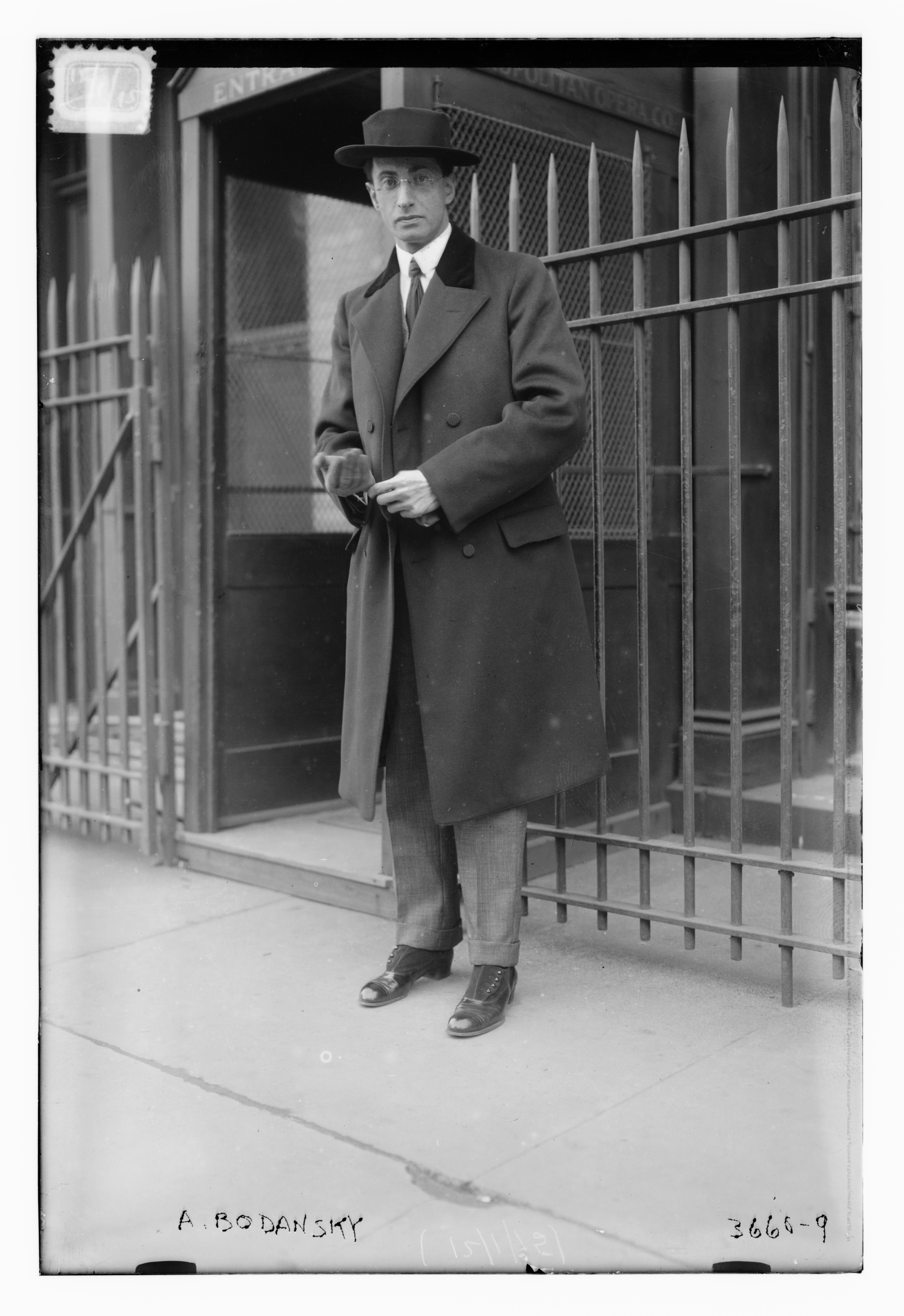
Artur Bodanzky at the Metropolitan Opera in 1915

Artur Bodanzky (also written as Artur Bodzansky) (16 December 1877 – 23 November 1939) was an Austrian-American conductor particularly associated with the operas of Wagner. He conducted Enrico Caruso's last performance at the Metropolitan Opera House on Christmas Eve 1920.

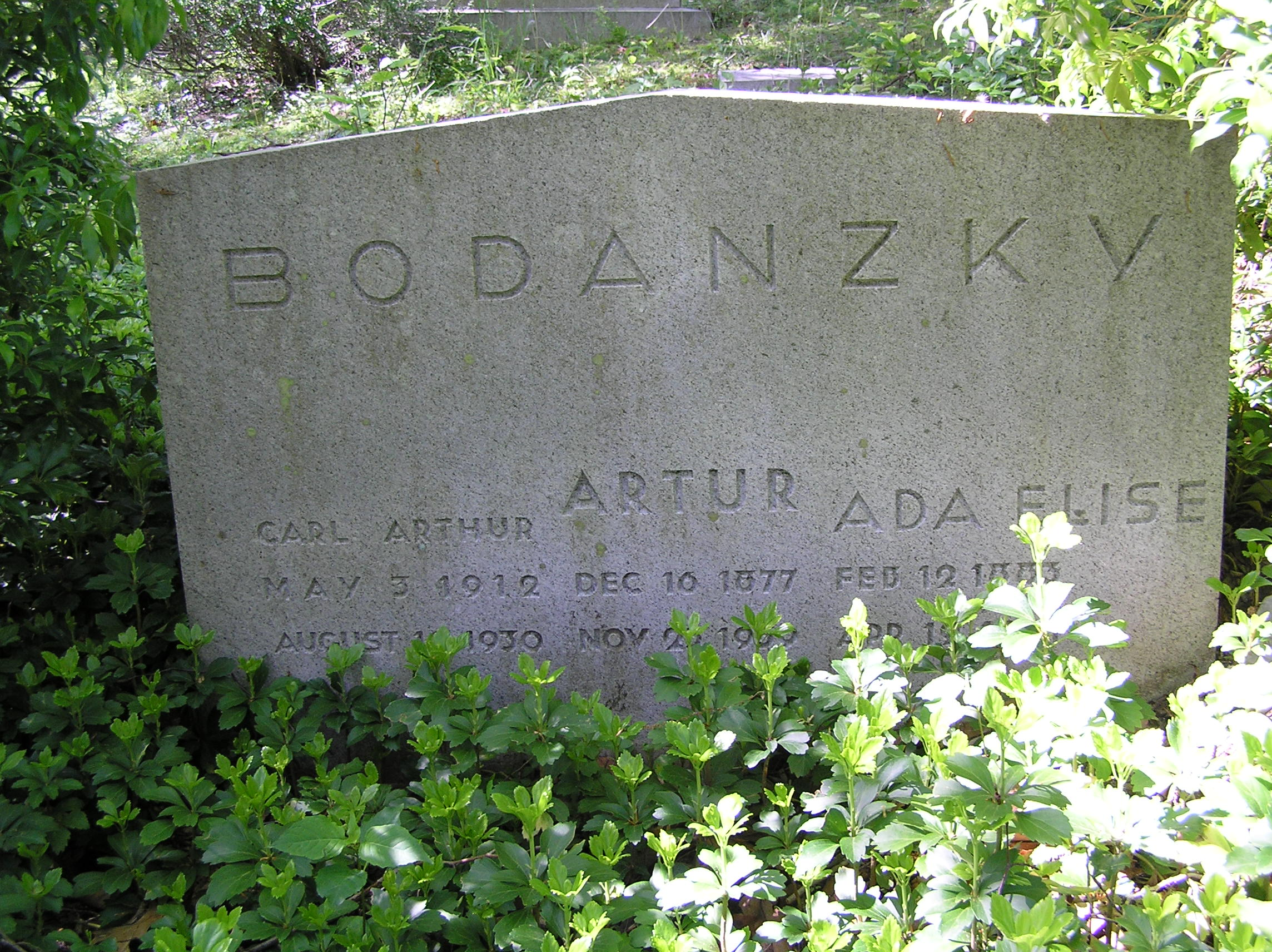
The gravesite of Artur Bodanzky in Sleepy Hollow Cemetery, Sleepy Hollow, NY

The son of Jewish merchants, Bodanzky studied the violin and composition with Alexander Zemlinsky. Bodanzky then became conducting assistant to Gustav Mahler in Vienna, later going on to jobs in Berlin, the Neues Deutsches Theater in Prague (August 1907), where he was briefly a colleague of Otto Klemperer and Mannheim. In 1915 he emigrated to the United States to work for the Metropolitan Opera, being replaced at Mannheim by Wilhelm Furtwängler.

He was head of German repertory at the Met, being accepted by Arturo Toscanini on the recommendation of Ferruccio Busoni. In 1921 he was engaged by the New York Philharmonic as a guest conductor. In 1928, Bodanzky announced his resignation from the Met and was replaced by Joseph Rosenstock. However, Rosenstock received such criticism in the press that he himself resigned almost immediately on medical advice, and Bodanzky was rehired, and remained at the Met until his death in 1939. He was approached by Thomas Beecham to conduct at Covent Garden in 1936, but his requested fee of £250 for each performance was considered exorbitant.

== Conducting style and critical reception ==
When he was appointed to his position at Mannheim Bodanzky was praised as a "mature and diligent" conductor" with "only one deficiency: a certain heavy-handedness, a predilection for ritardando". However, later in his career at the Met Bodanzky became "notorious for his rapid tempi, particularly in Wagner". Bodanzky reputedly introduced more cuts in operas he prepared than many other contemporary conductors, and it was sometimes suggested that he was eager to finish the opera in time to play cards. H. L. Mencken criticized his abilities as a symphonic conductor, saying that "he gave an impression of being unfamiliar with what he was there to direct".

Many recordings survive of Bodanzky's Met broadcasts (some of which, for legal reasons, are not available in the United States). These include the very earliest Met broadcasts to survive, from 1933 and 1934, featuring substantial fragments of soprano Frida Leider in Die Walküre and Tristan und Isolde. From the recordings, it becomes apparent that Bodanzky's tempi fluctuate greatly, sometimes very fast, sometimes quite slow. In this practice, he is not far from the live recordings of such contemporaries as Albert Coates, Fritz Reiner, and Furtwängler. As to the matter of cuts, it was the almost invariable practice in opera houses outside Bayreuth at that time. Bodanzky compares favorably with both Furtwängler and Reiner in this respect. In 1944, Szell gave a broadcast performance of Die Walküre which has been reissued on CD and which, as regards fast tempi and severity of cuts, is comparable to anything of Bodanzky's.

Frida Leider praised Bodanzky's "outstanding artistry" in her autobiography, written after Bodanzky's death. Arturo Toscanini, who had supported Bodansky's appointment to the Met, was reportedly saddened by his death.

== Family ==
Artur was the brother of the noted journalist and playwright Robert Bodanzky.

His daughter Elizabeth Bodanzky (1910–1967) is the namesake of the William and Elizabeth (Bodanzky) Muschenheim House, a National Register of Historic Places-listed Modern-style house in Ann Arbor, Michigan, along with her husband William Muschenheim (1902–1992; m. 1930).

== Bibliography ==
- Beaumont, Anthony (2000). Zemlinsky. Ithaca, NY: Cornell University Press. ISBN 0-8014-3803-9.
- Horowitz, Joseph (2005). Classical Music in America: A History of Its Rise and Fall. New York, NY: W. W. Norton and Company. ISBN 0-393-05717-8.
