= Carlos Alexander =

American operatic baritone

Carlos Alexander (October 15, 1915 – September 4, 1991) was a dramatic baritone and stage director of opera, best known as a singing-actor in German repertoire.

== Biography ==
Born in Utica, New York, he debuted as a singer in Scranton, Pennsylvania, as the Conte di Luna in Il trovatore, in 1940. As director, his first production was of Die Fledermaus, for the Pittsburgh Opera, in 1944.

Alexander sang with companies in Latin and North America and Europe, including Bayreuth (Sixtus Beckmesser in Wieland Wagner's Die Meistersinger, 1963 and 1964). Operas in which he appeared include Lulu, Il prigioniero, Moses und Aron, Der fliegende Holländer, Lohengrin, Parsifal (as Amfortas), Der Ring des Nibelungen (as Wotan), and Tristan und Isolde.

In 1947, the baritone appeared in Ariadne auf Naxos (as the Major-Domo) and Salome (as Jochanaan) at the New York City Opera.

His 1950 performance, at Carnegie Hall, of Mahler's Symphony No. 8, under Leopold Stokowski, was recorded, with George London and Eugene Conley among the other soloists. Also in his discography is a 1961 studio recording of Orff's Antigonae (as Kreon), opposite Inge Borkh. In 1968, he portrayed Dr Schön in the Stuttgart film of Wieland's production of Lulu, with Anja Silja in the title role.

At the Vienna Staatsoper, Alexander appeared in Arabella (1959 and 1965), Salome (1959), Prince Igor (1960), Götterdämmerung (as Gunther, 1960), Der fliegende Holländer (1964), Lohengrin (as Friedrich von Telramund, 1967), Die Zauberflöte (as the Sprecher, 1967), Prometheus (the name part, 1969), and Penderecki's Die Teufel von Loudon (as Urbain Grandier, 1973).

As director, Alexander's productions were seen in Toronto, Stuttgart, Chicago, New Orleans (Les contes d'Hoffmann, 1947), Pittsburgh, and Santa Fe. His stagings included Fidelio, The Rape of Lucretia, Madama Butterfly, Salome, and Der fliegende Holländer.

Of the Kammersänger's Wotan, Wieland Wagner declared that, "No vocal giant has moved me so deeply in Wotan's Farewell as Alexander."
