= Hermann Uhde =

German opera singer

Hermann Uhde (July 20, 1914 – October 10, 1965) was a German Wagnerian bass-baritone. He was born in Bremen and died on stage of a heart attack during a performance in Copenhagen.

He studied in his hometown, where he gave his début in 1936. During the war, he sang in Munich and at the opera of The Hague (then occupied by German troops). He sang at the Salzburg Festival from 1949 on (singing the role of Kreon in the premiere of Carl Orff's Antigonae), at the Bayreuth Festival from 1951 on and at the Metropolitan Opera from 1955 to 1964.

He began as a low, dark bass, and later moved up to baritone. He continued singing low bass roles occasionally, such as the Grand Inquisitor from Don Carlos.

The cutting quality of his voice and diction lead to him being cast in villainous roles at the Bayreuth Festival, such as Telramund and Klingsor, or in morally ambiguous roles such as Wotan, Gunther or the title role in Flying Dutchman. In spite of being a famous singer, he often also sang small roles such as Donner in Das Rheingold, Melot in Tristan und Isolde, the Grand Inquisitor in Don Carlos, and Shchelkalov in Boris Godunov. In the United States, he created a sensation at the Metropolitan Opera in his debut title role as Wozzeck (sung in English), with Eleanor Steber singing Marie.

== Selected discography ==
- Parsifal - Hans Knappertsbusch, 1951
- Das Rheingold - Joseph Keilberth, 1952
- Götterdämmerung - Clemens Krauss, 1953
- Arabella - Rudolf Kempe, 1953 live performance Mandryka
- Lohengrin- Joseph Keilberth, 1953; also Eugen Jochum, 1954.
- Der Fliegende Holländer- Hans Knappertsbusch, 1955
- Das Rheingold and Siegfried - Rudolf Kempe, 1960
- "A Portrait of Hermann Uhde" - Gala, catalogue number 100.749
