= William and Elizabeth (Bodanzky) Muschenheim House =

- U.S. National Register of Historic Places
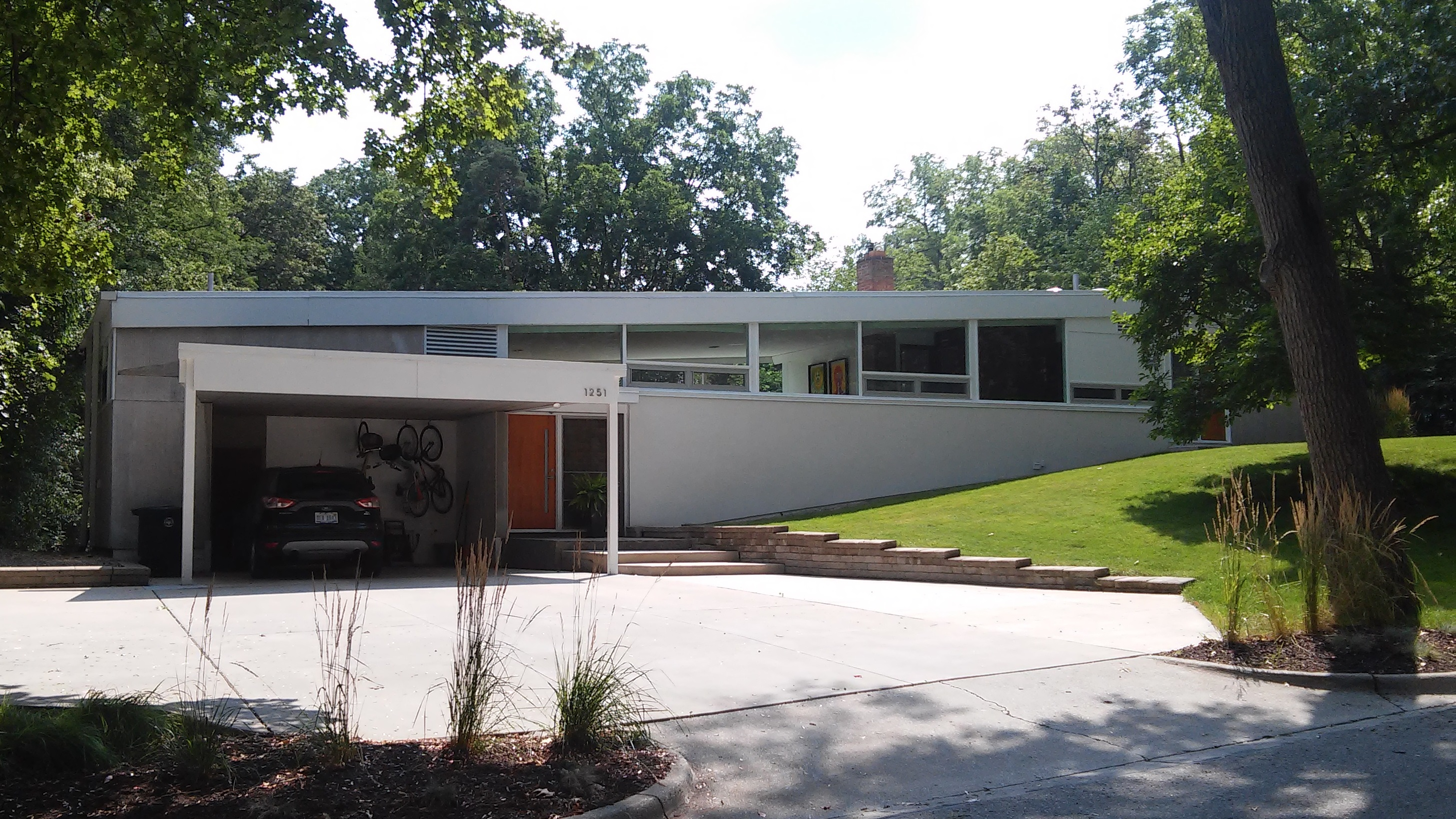
- Interactive map
- Location: 1251 Heather Way, Ann Arbor, Michigan
- Coordinates: 42°16′1″N 83°42′35″W
- Built: 1954
- Architect: William Muschenheim
- Architectural style: Modern architecture
- NRHP reference No.: 16000911
- Added to NRHP: December 27, 2016

The William and Elizabeth (Bodanzky) Muschenheim House is a single-family home located at 1251 Heather Way in Ann Arbor, Michigan. It was listed on the National Register of Historic Places in 2016.

== History ==
William Muschenheim was born in 1902 in New York City. He attended the Cutler School and Williams College, then enrolled in the architecture program at the Massachusetts Institute of Technology in 1921. In 1925, he applied to Peter Behrens's Master School of Architecture at the Academy of Fine Arts Vienna. Muschenheim graduated in 1929, married Elizabeth Bodanzky in Manheim, Germany and returned to the United States, where began working for the prominent New York architectural firm of Peabody, Wilson & Brown. Muschenheim left the firm in 1934 and began his own private practice, working primarily for residential clients located in New York and Long Island.

In 1950, Muschenheim accepted a teaching position at the University of Michigan. In 1954, he built this house for his own use. He continued teaching at the University until his retirement in 1972, but remained active in the academic community. He lived in this house until his death in 1990.

== Description ==
The Muschenheim House is a long, rectangular, five-bay concrete block and steel frame structure built on three levels. It has a low shed roof and curtain walls made from concrete block at the bottom, vertical colored cement siding, aluminum windows, and fascia and copper coping at the roof line. The street facade has a carport with a primary entrance through a wooden door with a large jalousie sidelight located nearby. A second door is within the carport, and a third door is located at the upslope end of the elevation. The windows are a combination of fixed wood units with integral aluminum awning windows, positioned high to ensure privacy while letting in natural light.

On the interior, the house contains approximately 3,300 square feet of living space, located on three levels. Rooms include three bedrooms, four bathrooms, a living and dining area, a kitchen, a study, an office and a basement/shop space. The interior plan is centered around an open living area, with bedrooms on one end and the kitchen on the other.
