= Ludwig Hofmann (bass) =

German opera singer

Ludwig Hofmann (14 January 1891 in Frankfurt am Main – 28 December 1963 in Frankfurt am Main) was a German opera singer (bass), who from the late 1920s obtained worldwide recognition above all as an exponent of Wagnerian roles. He worked principally in the opera houses in Berlin and Vienna and in the Vienna State Opera, and from 1928 to 1942 was frequently involved in the Bayreuth Festivals.

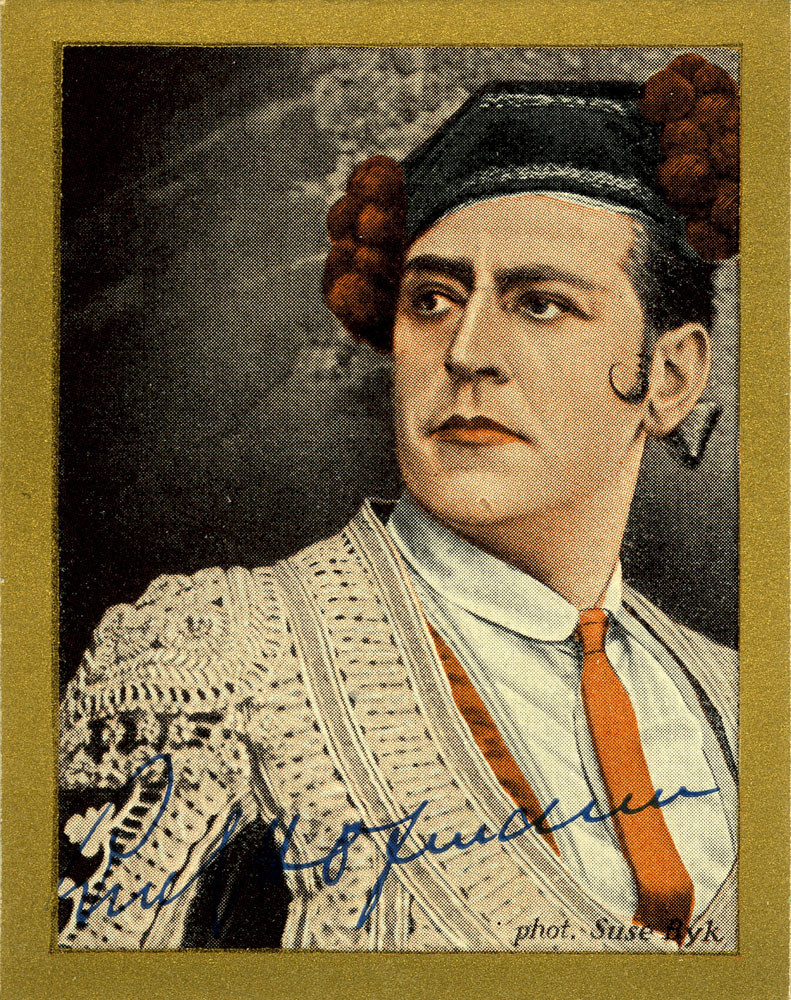
Ludwig Hofmann picture was bordered with colour Gold

== Life ==
Growing up in Frankfurt am Main, he completed his secondary school there and embarked on the study of singing, which he undertook in Milan. From 1914 to 1918 he took part in the First World War. In 1918, aged 23, he made his debut as an opera singer in the Bamberg Staatstheater. After that he was engaged at the Landestheater in Dessau (1919–1920), at the Stadttheater in Bremen (1920–1925), at the Wiesbaden Staatstheater (1925–1928), at the Berlin Municipal Opera (1928–1932), at the Berlin State Opera (1932–1935) and at the Vienna State Opera (1935–1942).

From 1929 until 1936 he sang at the Salzburg Festivals. From 1930 to 1938 he had guest roles at leading opera-houses in Europe and overseas (for example at Teatro alla Scala Milan, at Covent Garden Opera in London, at the Théâtre des Champs-Élysées in Paris, and the Metropolitan Opera in New York City).

After the Second World War he was able to resume his singing career through guest roles in Berlin, Brussels, London and Vienna. In 1953 he sang at the Salzburg Festival. His final stage appearance was as Wotan (Der Ring des Nibelungen) in Brussels in 1955. Thereafter he was active as a singing teacher in London.

== Bayreuth Festivals ==
Ludwig Hofmann sang first in 1928 and later uninterruptedly from 1937 to 1942 in the Bayreuth Festivals, where he alternated in roles with Ivar Andrésen (1896–1940) and Josef von Manowarda (1890–1942).

- 1928: King Mark (Tristan und Isolde), Gurnemanz (Parsifal).
- 1937: King Heinrich (Lohengrin), Fafner (Das Rheingold, Siegfried), Hunding (Die Walküre).
- 1938: King Mark, Fafner, Hunding.
- 1939: Daland (Der fliegende Holländer), Fafner, Hunding.
- 1940: Daland, Fafner, Hunding
- 1941: Daland, Fafner, Hunding
- 1942: Daland

== Sources ==
- Elisabeth Th. Hilscher-Fritz: 'Hofmann, Ludwig', in Oesterreichisches Musiklexikon. Online edition, Vienna 2002 ff. (ISBN 3-7001-3077-5); Printed edition, (Austrian Academy of Sciences, Vienna 2003), Vol. II. (ISBN 3-7001-3044-9).
- Kürschners deutscher Musiker-Kalender 1954, 2nd Edition of the Deutscher Musiker-Lexikon (de Gruyter, Berlin 1954).
- Karl-Josef Kutsch and Leo Riemens, Unvergängliche Stimmen: kleines Sängerlexikon (Francke, Bern and Munich 1962).
- Karl J. Kutsch and Leo Riemens, Großes Sängerlexikon, 3rd Edition (Saur, Munich 1997).
