= Nikolaus Lehnhoff =

German opera director (1939–2015)

Nikolaus Lehnhoff (20 May 1939 in Hanover – 29 August 2015 in Berlin) was a German opera director.

== Life and career ==
Born in Hanover to Erika (née Fiediger) and Friedrich Lehnhoff, Lehnhoff studied at LMU Munich and the University of Vienna. Lehnhoff began his career working as a stage director at the Deutsche Oper Berlin and as an assistant to Wieland Wagner at the Bayreuth Festival in the 1960s. He then became a stage director for the Metropolitan Opera, beginning with the 1967 revival of Mozart's The Marriage of Figaro. He served as stage director for several more Met productions through 1970, including Ariadne auf Naxos, La bohème, The Flying Dutchman, and Simon Boccanegra.

In 1972, Lehnhoff directed his first opera; a production of Strauss' Die Frau ohne Schatten at the Paris Opera with Christa Ludwig and Walter Berry. He directed that same work for his directorial debut at the San Francisco Opera (SFO) with Leonie Rysanek as the Empress in 1976. He returned many times to direct for the SFO over the next three decades, including Salome (1982 & 1987), The Ring Cycle (1983-1985, 1990, & 1999), Die Walküre (1995), Parsifal (1999-2000), and The Flying Dutchman (2004-2005). His production of The Ring Cycle for the SFO was adopted by the National Theatre Munich in 1987.

Lehnhoff directed several works for the Glyndebourne Festival Opera, including Tristan und Isolde (2003); the company's first staging of an opera by Richard Wagner. Other operas he directed for Glyndebourne included Káťa Kabanová (1988), Jenůfa (1989), and The Makropulos Affair (1995).

In 1988, Lehnhoff directed Berlioz's La damnation de Faust at the Hamburg State Opera in a production that utilized pop video art by Suzan Pitt. In 1989 he made his debut at the Santa Fe Opera directing The Flying Dutchman with James Morris in the title role. That same year he made his directorial debut at the Metropolitan Opera with Eva Marton as his Salome. He directed that same work three more times at the Met; in 1990, 1996, and 2004. From 2000 to 2001, he directed Parsifal and The Flying Dutchman at the Lyric Opera of Chicago. In 2006, he directed the European debut of Jake Heggie's Dead Man Walking at the Semperoper in Dresden. In 2013, he directed The Flying Dutchman at the Los Angeles Opera. The last production he directed was Puccini's Turandot at La Scala in May 2015.
