= Christel Goltz =

German operatic soprano 1912–2008)

Christel Goltz (8 July 1912 – 14 November 2008) was a German operatic soprano. One of the leading dramatic sopranos of her generation, she possessed a rich voice with a brilliant range and intensity. She was particularly associated with the operas of Richard Strauss, especially Salome and Elektra, and with contemporary operas.

Born in Dortmund, she studied in Munich with Ornelli-Leeb and with Theodor Schenk, whom she later married. After singing small roles, she made her official debut in 1935 in Fürth as Agathe in Der Freischütz. She sang one season in Plauen before joining the roster of principal sopranos at the Staatsoper Dresden through the invitation of Karl Böhm in 1936. She remained at that house until 1950. She began appearing at both the Berlin State Opera and the Städtische Oper Berlin in 1947, and at the Munich State Opera and Vienna State Opera in 1950. Beginning in 1951, she also made guest appearances in Salzburg], Milan, Rome, Brussels, Paris, London, Buenos Aires, and sang at the New York Metropolitan Opera in 1954.

Besides Salome and Elektra, her greatest successes included the title role in Jenůfa, Marie in Wozzeck, Die Färberin in Die Frau ohne Schatten, Leonora in Fidelio, Elettra in Idomeneo. She created the title role in Carl Orff's Antigonae and Rolf Liebermann's Penelope. An intense singing-actress with a clear and powerful voice of great range, she also tackled a few Italian roles, notably Turandot. She died in Baden bei Wien, Austria, aged 96.

== Recordings ==
- Salome – Christel Goltz, Inger Karen, Bernd Aldenhoff, Josef Herrmann – Saxon State Orchestra, Joseph Keilberth – Oceana (1950)
- Turandot – Christel Goltz, Hans Hopf, Teresa Stich-Randall, Wilhelm Schirp – Cologne Radio Chorus and Orchestra, Georg Solti – Cantus Classics (1956) sung in German
