= Pietro Massa =

Italian pianist, musicologist and classical philologist

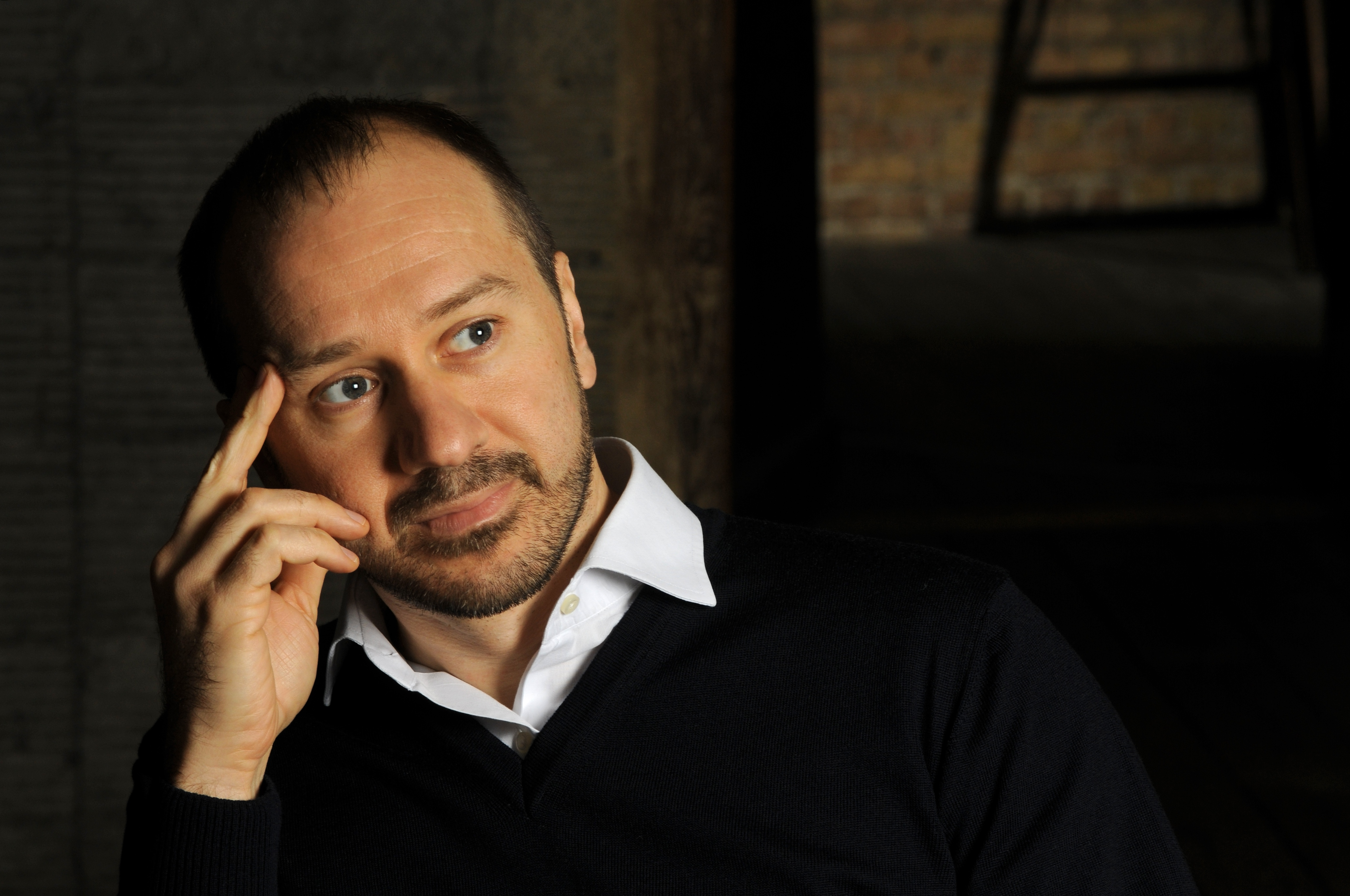
- Pietro Massa, 2015
- Born: 6 March 1973 (age 53); Milan, Italy
- Education: Milan Conservatory University of Pavia Free University Berlin
- Occupations: Pianist; Musicologist

Pietro Massa (born 6 March 1973) is an Italian classical pianist and musicologist.

== Education ==
Pietro Massa received his initial piano training from Giuseppe Aneomanti, who significantly influenced his musical development. He continued his academic education as a pianist at the Milan Conservatory, studying under Luciano Lanfranchi, a student of Alberto Mozzati. Additionally, he studied composition under Bruno Bettinelli, who also taught Claudio Abbado and Riccardo Muti. He studied harmony with Danilo Lorenzini, a representative of the Luigi Dallapiccola school of composition, and counterpoint with Adelchi Amisano, a student of Goffredo Petrassi. In parallel, Pietro Massa completed a degree in Classical Philology at the University of Pavia with a focus on Greek studies. In 1996, he left Italy to continue his piano studies in Paris under Aldo Ciccolini. In 1999, he relocated from Paris to Berlin.

In Berlin, Pietro Massa deepened his interest in music research. He completed his doctorate at the Free University of Berlin under Jürgen Maehder, focusing on the interpretation of ancient Greek mythology in the music theater of Carl Orff.

== Career ==
Pietro Massa performs as a pianist worldwide, including in Western Europe, Brazil, Japan, Kazakhstan, Turkey, Ukraine, the United States, and Uruguay. His repertoire includes approximately 30 piano concertos, including those by Brahms, Busoni, Rachmaninoff, and Respighi, which he performs with renowned orchestras. His solo piano repertoire ranges from the Baroque to the modern era, and he has performed in prestigious venues in Berlin (Philharmonie and Konzerthaus), Hamburg (Laeiszhalle), Munich (Gasteig), Düsseldorf (Tonhalle and Robert-Schumann-Saal), Nuremberg (Meistersingerhalle) and Stuttgart (Liederhalle).

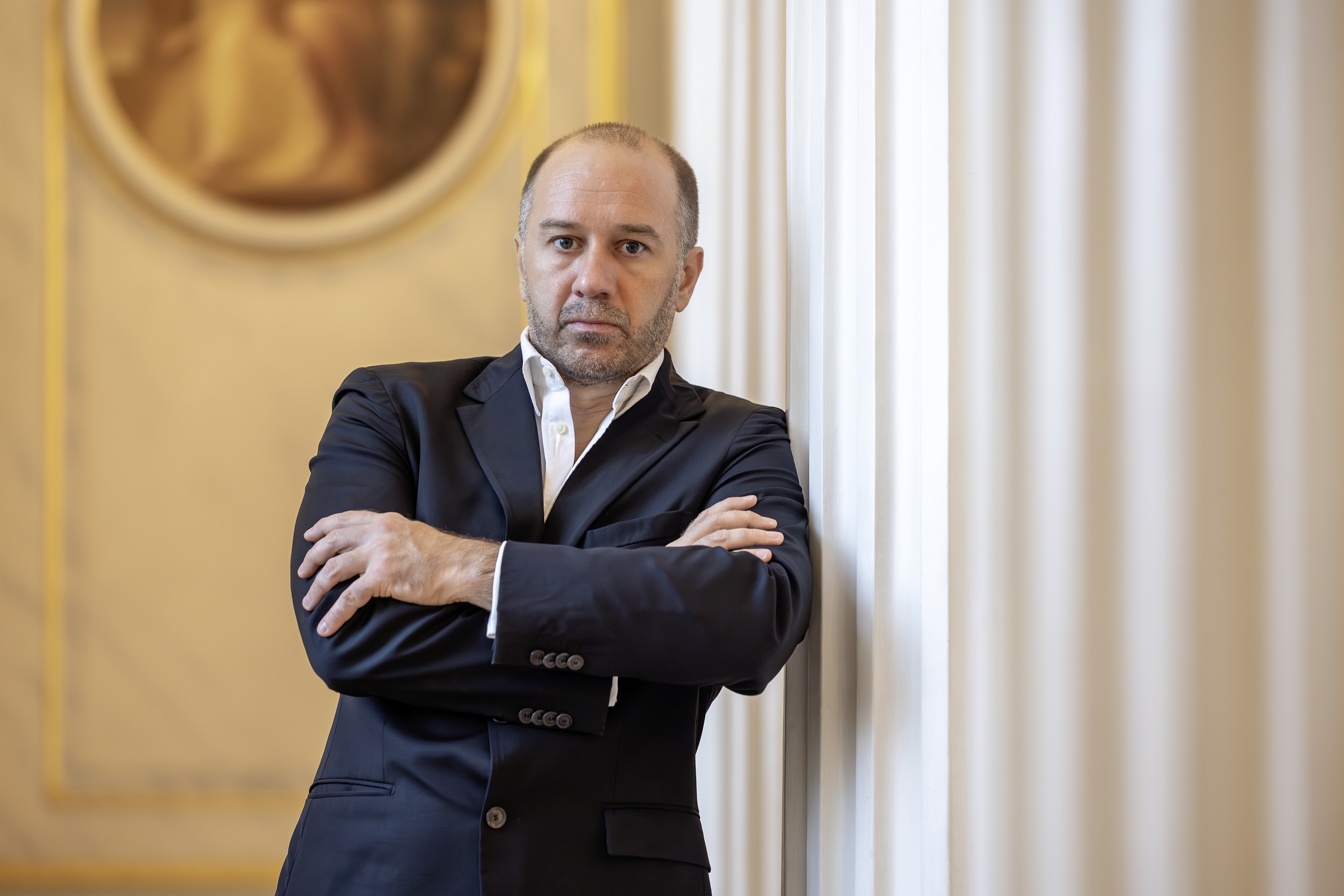
Pietro Massa (2024)

Shortly after the release of his live recording of Rachmaninoff's Piano Concerto No. 3 in D minor, Op. 30, Pietro Massa was invited in 2008 to perform and record Ferruccio Busoni's "Piano Concerto with Male Choir in C major, Op. 39" with the Neubrandenburg Philharmonic and the Berlin Ernst Senff Choir. The performance in Neubrandenburg was broadcast live by Deutschlandradio Kultur (now Deutschlandfunk Kultur) and reached over 150,000 listeners. The resulting CD received acclaimed reviews, leading to a subsequent performance with the same ensemble in 2009 at the Grand Hall of the Berlin Philharmonie.

In 2025, Pietro Massa will begin his multi-year solo project, ChopinPlus, at the Berliner Philharmonie.

In addition to his work as a pianist, Pietro Massa is currently a visiting scholar at the Humboldt University of Berlin. At the Institute for Musicology and Media Studies, he is working with Arne Stollberg on his research project, "History and Aesthetics of Italian Piano Music." Massa's publication is scheduled for 2027.

== Repertoire ==
Pietro Massa increasingly focuses on the Italian piano repertoire of the 19th and 20th centuries. In collaboration with Deutschlandradio Kultur, he recorded the Piano Rarities CD series under the "Capriccio" label.

While researching in the Fleisher Collection archives in Philadelphia, Pietro Massa discovered the long-lost score of Mario Castelnuovo-Tedesco's Piano Concerto No. 2 in F major, Op. 92. He performed the European premiere of the piece in September 2009 at the Great Hall of the Berlin Philharmonie with the Berliner Symphoniker. This success led to a long-term collaboration with conductor Stefan Malzew, resulting in highly regarded recordings, including Piano Concerto No. 2, Op. 66 by Giuseppe Martucci, Piano Concertos by Ottorino Respighi, Scarlattiana by Alfredo Casella and Piano Concerto No. 1 by Giuseppe Martucci. He also performed Luigi Dallapiccola's Piccolo Concerto per Muriel Couvreux with the Rundfunk-Sinfonieorchester Berlin and Goffredo Petrassi's Concerto for Piano and Orchestra with the Göttinger Symphonieorchester. In 2011, Pietro Massa released the world premiere recording of the complete piano works by Riccardo Zandonai.

== Critical Appraisal ==
- Das Orchester praised Pietro Massa's performance of Ferruccio Busoni's Concerto for Piano and Orchestra with Male Chorus in C major, op. 39, noting: "A brilliant pianist was found in Pietro Massa, who mastered the immensely difficult and compact work with joyful playfulness, displaying assured virtuosity and colorful touch at every moment while maintaining the tension until the very end."
- Nordkurier commended his interpretation of Giuseppe Martucci's Piano Concerto No. 1 in D minor, op. 40, stating: "In passages demanding powerful cascades of chords and wild octave runs, Pietro Massa delivers convincingly. However, he favors nuanced playing, an elegant touch in sparkling arpeggios, and flexible dynamics in the expressive melodic lines of the tranquil middle movement. He meets the high virtuosic demands of the solo part with understated sophistication. Moreover, he understands the concerto as a symphonic work, blending his playing seamlessly with the orchestral colors in certain passages."
- Göttinger Tageblatt praised Pietro Massa's performance at the German premiere of Goffredo Petrassi's Concerto for Piano and Orchestra, noting: "With Goffredo Petrassi's Piano Concerto, there was a German premiere of unparalleled musical drama. Pianist Pietro Massa dazzled with impressive technique in this work marked by Neoclassicism ..."

== Selected publications ==
- Pietro Massa, Antikerezeption und musikalische Dramaturgie in „Die Bakchantinnen“ (1931) von Egon Wellesz, in: Peter Csobádi/Gernot Gruber u. a. (Hg.), Das (Musik-)Theater in Exil und Diktatur, Anif/Salzburg: Mueller-Speiser, 2005, pp. 418–435.
- Pietro Massa, Carl Orffs Antikendramen und die Hölderlin-Rezeption im Deutschland der Nachkriegszeit, Ph.D. dissertation, Frankfurt: Peter Lang, 2006.
- Pietro Massa, Flug und Ekstase in Alexander Skrjabins Tonsystem. Gedankenwelt und Visionen eines Mystikers, in: Ingrid Erhardt (Ed.), Resonanzprozesse zwischen Werk und Biografie (= Jahrbuch für Psychoanalyse und Musik, Bd. 5), Gießen: Psychosozial-Verlag, 2021, pp. 51–71.

== Discography ==
Recording Date	Works	Other Artists	Publisher
2003	Chromatisme Mystique. Franz Liszt: Ballade h-Moll, César Franck: Prélude, Aria et Final, Alexander Scriabin: 2 Morceaux op. 57, 2 Poèmes op. 63, Sonate Nr. 7 op. 64, Alfredo Casella: Berceuse triste op. 14, Goffredo Petrassi: Toccata	Pietro Massa (Solo Piano)	Master Arts
2008	Sergei Rachmaninoff: Piano Concerto No. 3 in D minor, Op. 30; Symphonic Dances, Op. 45	Orchestra Bruno Maderna, Daniele Giorgi (Conductor)	Genuin
2008	Ferruccio Busoni: Piano Concerto with Male Choir in C major, Op. 39	Ernst Senff Choir, Neubrandenburger Philharmonie, Stefan Malzew (Conductor)	Genuin
2010	Piano Rarities. Mario Castelnuovo-Tedesco: Piano Concerto No. 2 in F major, Op. 92 (World Premiere Recording), La Sirenetta e il pesce turchino, Alghe, Vitalba e Biancospino, Passatempi, 5 piccoli Walzer, Onde – Due studi per Pianoforte	Berliner Symphoniker, Alessandro Crudele (Conductor)	Capriccio
2010	Piano Rarities. Luigi Dallapiccola: Piccolo concerto per pianoforte e orchestra da camera, Sonatina canonica su Capricci di Niccolò Paganini, Tre episodi dal Balletto Marsia, Quaderno musicale di Annalibera, Due pezzi per orchestra	Rundfunk-Sinfonieorchester Berlin, Peter Hirsch (Conductor)	Capriccio
2011	Piano Rarities. Riccardo Zandonai: Telefunken, Tempo di Valzer, Canzone montanina, Berceuse, Fiori sotto la neve, Intermezzo – Cavalcata da „Giulietta e Romeo“, Sera, Sogno giovanile, Primavera in Val di Sole	Pietro Massa (Solo Piano)	Crystal Classics
2013	Piano Rarities. Mario Castelnuovo-Tedesco: Piano Concerto No. 1 in G minor, Op. 46, Piano Concerto No. 2 in F major, Op. 92, La sirenetta e il pesce turchino Op. 18, Vitalba e Biancospino Op. 21, I Naviganti Op. 13, Alghe Op. 12, Le danze del Re David Op. 37, Passatempi Op. 54, 2 Film Studies Op. 67	Neubrandenburger Philharmonie, Stefan Malzew (Conductor)	Capriccio
2013	Piano Rarities. Giuseppe Martucci: Piano Concerto No. 2 in B minor, Op. 66, Tema e variazoni Op. 58, Notturno No. 1 Op. 70 (Piano Version)	Neubrandenburger Philharmonie, Stefan Malzew (Conductor)	Capriccio
2014	Piano Rarities. Goffredo Petrassi: Piano Concerto, Partita, Toccata, Invenzioni	Göttinger Symphonie Orchester, Christoph-Mathias Mueller (Conductor)	Capriccio
2015	Ferruccio Busoni: Piano Concerto with Male Choir in C major, Op. 39	Ernst Senff Choir, Neubrandenburger Philharmonie, Stefan Malzew (Conductor)	Myricae Classics/Naxos
2023	Johannes Brahms: Piano Concerto No. 2 in B-flat major, Op. 83, Tragic Overture, Op. 81	Harvestehuder Sinfonieorchester, Christian Kunert (Conductor)	Myricae Classics/Naxos
2024	Giuseppe Martucci: Piano Concerto No. 1 in D minor, Op. 40, Symphony No. 1 in D minor, Op. 75	Neubrandenburger Philharmonie, Stefan Malzew (Conductor)	Myricae Classics/Naxos
2025	Johann Sebastian Bach: Goldberg Variations BWV 988	Pietro Massa (Solo Piano)	Myricae Classics/Naxos
