= Günther Treptow =

German opera singer (1907–1981)

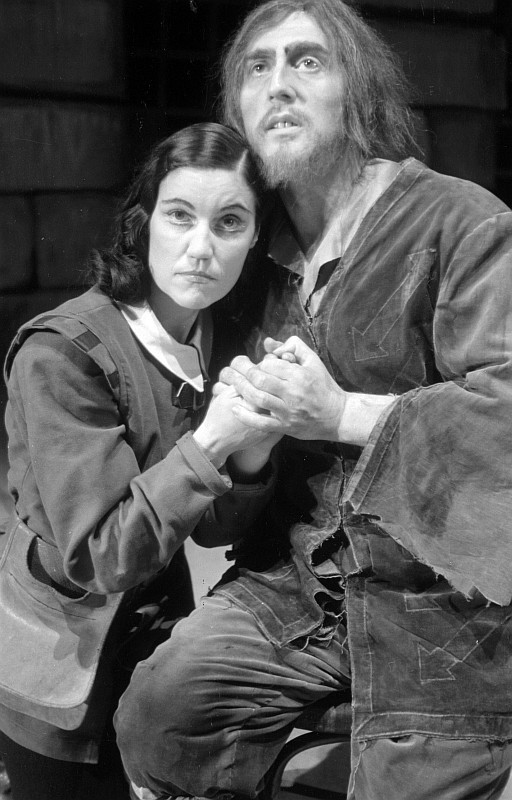
Treptow as Florestan in Beethoven's Fidelio

Günther Treptow (22 October 1907 in Berlin – 28 March 1981 in Berlin) was a German operatic tenor, best known for Wagner roles.

Treptow began his vocal studies in Berlin as a baritone under the Italian bass, Giovanni Scarneo. Treptow was since 1926 a member of the SA and Nazi Party (membership number 38 579) until the discovery in 1934 of his mother's Jewish heritage. He was banned from performing until being granted special permission to do so from Joseph Goebbels on 6 June 1935. He made his stage debut in Berlin, as the Italian singer in Der Rosenkavalier, in 1936. He sang at the Vienna Volksoper in 1938, as Florestan in Fidelio. He appeared at the Sopot Festival in 1939, in the title role of Tannhäuser. He made his debut at the Munich State Opera in 1940, the Vienna State Opera in 1947, and the Bayreuth Festival in 1951.

He quickly established himself as one of the leading heldentenors of his generation, in roles such as Siegmund in Die Walküre, Siegfried in Siegfried and Götterdämmerung, Walther von Stolzing in Die Meistersinger von Nürnberg and Tristan in Tristan und Isolde. Besides Wagner, he also sang such roles as Max in Der Freischütz, Steva in Jenůfa, Canio in Pagliacci, and the title role in Otello.

On the international scene, he made guest appearances at La Scala in Milan, La Monnaie in Brussels, the Royal Opera House in London, the Teatro Colón in Buenos Aires, the Metropolitan Opera in New York, also appearing in Leningrad and Moscow.

He sang at the Deutsche Oper Berlin from 1961 until his retirement in 1972.

== Discography ==
- 1948 – Die Walküre (Wagner), conducted by Rudolf Moralt (Role: Siegmund)
- 1948 – Siegfried (Wagner), conducted by Rudolf Moralt (Role: Siegfried)
- 1948 – Götterdämmerung (Wagner), conducted by Rudolf Moralt (Role: Siegfried)
- 1948 – Parsifal (Wagner), conducted by Rudolf Moralt (Role: Parsifal)
- 1949 – Die Meistersinger von Nürnberg (Wagner), conducted by Eugen Jochum (Role: Walther)
- 1950 – Il Tabarro (Puccini), conducted by Wilhelm Loibner (Role: Luigi)
- 1950 – Tannhäuser (Wagner), conducted by Kurt Schröder (Role: Tannhäuser)
- 1950 – Rienzi (Wagner), conducted by Winfried Zillig (Role: Rienzi)
- 1950 – Tristan und Isolde (Wagner), conducted by Hans Knappertsbusch (Role: Tristan)
- 1950 – Die Meistersinger von Nürnberg (Wagner), conducted by Hans Knappertsbusch (Role: Walther)
- 1950 – Das Rheingold (Wagner), conducted by Wilhelm Furtwängler (Role: Froh)
- 1950 – Die Walküre (Wagner), conducted by Wilhelm Furtwängler (Role: Siegmund)
- 1951 – Die Walküre (Wagner), conducted by Fritz Stiedry (Role: Siegmund)
- 1952 – Tristan und Isolde (Wagner), conducted by Erich Kleiber (Role: Tristan)
- 1952 – Die Walküre (Wagner), conducted by Joseph Keilberth (Role: Siegmund)
- 1953 – Der Bergsee (Bittner), conducted by Felix Prohaska (Role: Jörg Steinlechner)
- 1953 – Rienzi (Wagner), conducted by Robert Heger (Role: Rienzi)
- 1954 – Tiefland (d'Albert), conducted by Rudolf Moralt (Role: Pedro)
- 1964 – Die Meistersinger von Nürnberg (Wagner), conducted by Karl Böhm (Role: Eisslinger)
- 1968 – Der junge Lord (Henze), conducted by Christoph von Dohnányi (Role: Amintore La Rocca)

== Sources ==
- Operissimo.com
