= Hilde Zadek =

German operatic soprano (1917–2019)

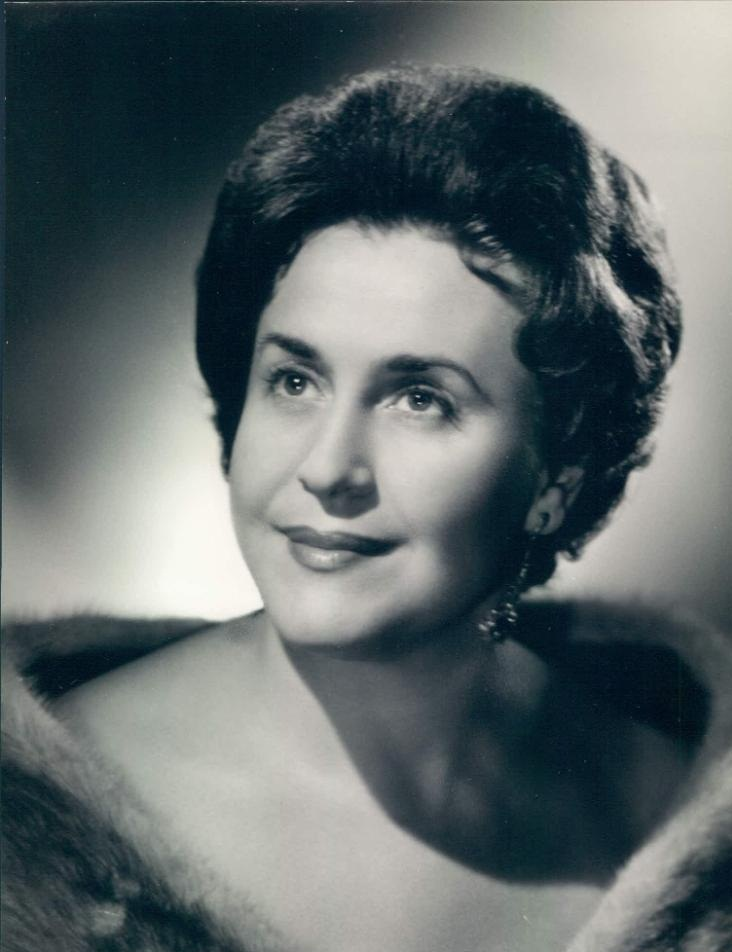
- Born: 15 December 1917; Bromberg, Province of Posen
- Died: 21 February 2019 (aged 101); Karlsruhe, Germany
- Education: Palestine Academy of Music in Jerusalem; Zurich Conservatory
- Occupations: Classical soprano; Academic teacher
- Organizations: Vienna State Opera
- Awards: Kammersängerin; Austrian Cross of Honour for Science and Art

Hildegard Zadek (15 December 1917 – 21 February 2019) was a German operatic soprano. She was Kammersängerin at the Vienna State Opera and performed internationally.

== Early life ==
Zadek, the oldest of three daughters of Elizabeth (Freundlich) and Alex Zadek, was born in Bromberg, Province of Posen, on 15 December 1917. After her hometown became Polish after World War I, her parents moved to Stettin in 1920, where Zadek spent her youth.

However, as a Jew she was forced to leave Germany in 1934 and settled in then Palestine, where she worked as a nurse and shoe saleswoman in Jerusalem, while studying voice with Rose Pauly. In 1945, she returned to Europe and studied at the Zurich Conservatory with Ria Ginster.

== Life and career ==
She made her operatic debut on 3 February 1947 at the Vienna State Opera in the title role of Verdi's Aida to great acclaim; she remained with this theatre until 1971. The following year she first appeared at the Salzburg Festival, where she appeared as Donna Anna in Mozart's Don Giovanni, as Vittelia in his La clemenza di Tito, and in the title role of Ariadne auf Naxos by Richard Strauss. Her repertory also included Elsa in Wagner's Lohengrin, Eva in his Die Meistersinger von Nürnberg, and the title roles of Gluck's Iphigénie en Tauride and Puccini's Tosca.

Zadek took part in the world premiere of Carl Orff's Antigonae in 1949, and sang Magda Sorel in the local premiere in Vienna of Menotti's The Consul in 1950. She also appeared at the Munich State Opera and the Berlin State Opera. She made guest appearances at the Royal Opera House in London (from 1950 to 1953; the title roles of Aida and Tosca, Lisa in The Queen of Spades, Leonora in Il Trovatore, Contessa Almaviva in Le Nozze di Figaro), the Glyndebourne Festival and the Holland Festival, at the Paris Opéra, La Monnaie in Brussels, La Scala in Milan, and the Maggio Musicale Fiorentino, the Bolshoi Theatre in Moscow, etc.

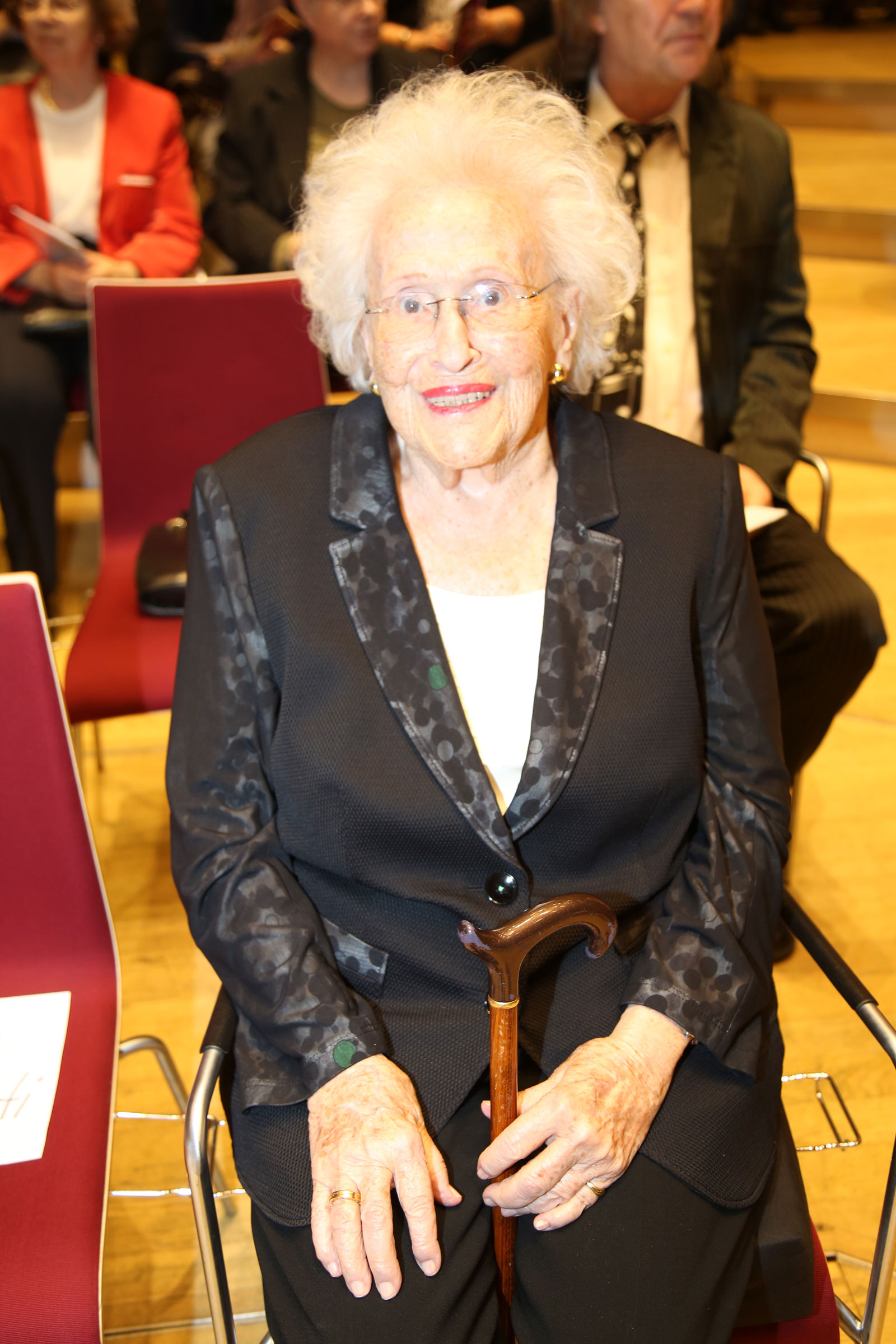
Zadek in April 2015 at age 97

Zadek made her debut at the Metropolitan Opera in New York as Donna Anna in Don Giovanni on 26 November 1952. Beside Donna Anna (4 performances), at the Met she sang Eva in Die Meistersinger von Nürnberg (2 performances), Elsa in Lohengrin (1 performance), and the title role of Aida (1 performance on 14 January 1953, her last at the Met). She also appeared at the San Francisco Opera and the Teatro Colón in Buenos Aires. Beginning in 1967, she taught at the Vienna Music Academy, and gave masterclasses. Her last performance at the Vienna State Opera was as Gerhilde in Die Walküre on 3 January 1971, and the same year she retired from the stage.

She left a notable recording of Donna Anna in a complete Don Giovanni, with conductor Rudolf Moralt, opposite George London, Léopold Simoneau and Sena Jurinac. She turned 100 on 15 December 2017.

Zadek died in Karlsruhe on 21 February 2019 at the age of 101.

For the promotion of young musicians, the Hildegard Zadek Foundation has held the biennial International Hilde Zadek Voice Competition since 2003. Through her father, Zadek was a cousin of noted art collector Heinz Berggruen.

== Awards ==
- 1951 Kammersängerin
- 1965 Austrian Cross of Honour for Science and Art
- 1977 Honorary member of the Vienna State Opera
- 1978 Honorary Medal of Vienna in gold
- 2007 Honorary doctorate from the University of Music Karlsruhe (on her 90th birthday)
- 2012 Grand Decoration of Honour for Services to the Republic of Austria

== Writings ==
Zadek, Hilde (2001). Parschalk, Volkmar (ed.). Mein Leben. 'Die Zeit, die ist ein sonderbar Ding'. Vienna: Böhlau. ISBN 978-3205993629.
