= Karl Elmendorff =

German conductor

Karl Eduard Maria Elmendorff (October 25, 1891 – October 21, 1962) was a German opera conductor.

Born in Düsseldorf, Elmendorff studied music at the Cologne College of Music and Hochschule für Musik Köln from 1913 to 1916 under Fritz Steinbach and Hermann Abendroth.

== Career ==
Early in his career, Elmendorff was a regular guest conductor in various European cities, including at La Scala:

- 1916 to 1920 in Düsseldorf
- 1920 to 1923 in Mainz
- 1923 to 1924 in Hagen
- 1925 at the Munich State Opera

After Bayreuth, he became the musical director at Mannheim and in 1942 in Dresden.

=== Bayreuth ===
When Fritz Busch refused to return to Bayreuth after the 1924 Festival and with Michael Balling dead the following year, Siegfried Wagner invited Elmendorff and Franz von Hoesslin to Bayreuth. Although Richard Wagner, at the beginning of his 1869 tract On Conducting (Über das Dirigiren), states that he has no intention of imposing a system on conducting practice, he nevertheless takes pains to establish a principle, summed up in the phrase, modification of tempo, which is "the principle conditioning the very life of music". In Damascene terms Wagner recalls how an 1839 performance of Beethoven's ninth symphony, by the Paris Conservatoire Orchestra conducted by François Habeneck, led him to believe that he had heard the symphony for the first time, and as Beethoven himself had conceived it. Habeneck's success was not solely attributable to conscientious diligence, although he did spend over two years studying and rehearsing the work, but rather that the orchestra "really sang this symphony". Habeneck had, Wagner expounds, "found the right tempo because he took infinite pains to get his orchestra to understand the melos of the symphony. Wagner defines melos as a singing style which shaped melodic phrases with rubato, tonal variation, and shifting accent, and the right comprehension of the melos is the sole guide to the right tempo: these two things are inseparable: the one implies and qualifies the other. Bayreuth conductors were able to develop their own idiosyncrasies, and a house style gradually developed from this Wagnerian Ideal. The Bayreuth style tended toward slower tempi, which not only reflected Cosima's personal ideology, but could also be practically justified as the style demanded by the Festspielhaus's unique acoustics. It was into this undulating sound world of flowing symphonic texture that both Elmendorff and von Hoesslin, men who fully met Bayreuth's conservative criteria, began their Bayreuth careers in 1927.

In 1928 Winifred was approached by Elsa Bruckmann to help enlist Muck into the ranks of the Militant League for German Culture (the KfdK). Winifred agreed to help and, in a letter to Bruckmann dated 15 October 1928, outlined her plan to use Elemendorff ('he's very keen on anything like this' as the easiest and most natural way of achieving their aim. In the end, neither Winifred, nor Elmendorff's enthusiasm could persuade Muck to join.

Following Siegfried Wagner's death in August 1930, a memorial concert was held in the Festspielhaus. The concert programme was framed by two pieces by Richard Wagner that commemorated Siegfried's birth and death; the opening piece, the Siegfried Idyll, conducted by Arturo Toscanini, and to close, Siegfried's Funeral March' from Götterdämmerung, conducted by Muck. The centrepiece of the concert was conducted by Elmendorff, and commemorated Siegfried's own 'modest genius' with excerpts from his operas including the overture to Angel of Peace and 'Faith' from Heathen King.

During the 1931 Festival a memorial concert was planned to take place on 4 August, the first anniversary of Siegfried's death. During the rehearsals a row broke out that led to Toscanini storming out of Bayreuth. Initially Furtwängler wanted to be the sole conductor of an all-Beethoven concert but Winifred insisted that all three of that year's Festival conductors Elmendorff, Wilhelm Furtwängler and Toscanini, should take part in a programme of music by Liszt, Richard and Siegfried Wagner. Furtwängler prolonged the argument by declaring that he had no intention of conducting "dynastic programme". The time taken up by the argument started to intrude on Toscanini's general rehearsal time, a situation exacerbated when an incompetent assistant lost Toscanini's score. Enraged, Toscanini snapped his baton and immediately left Bayreuth. From a safe distance in the US, he declared that he would never return and although he did return to conduct his remaining performances that year, he never again conducted at Bayreuth.

It wasn't until after Furtwängler acrimoniously departed following the 1936 Festival that Elmendorff was officially appointed as an assistant to the principal conductor, Heinz Tietjen. It was at this time, in 1937, that Elmendorff joined the Nazi Party.

==== Bayreuth Festival statistics ====
Elemendorff conducted five Ring cycles and eight performances, in total, of three different operas during his fifteen years at Bayreuth. His conducting at the Festival ended when Furtwängler returned to Bayreuth in 1943.

1927	Tristan und Isolde (Tr)
1928	Tr (see Discography)
1930	Der Ring des Nibelungen (R)
1930	Tannhäuser * Toscanini conducted the public performances but for contractual reasons Elemendorff conducted the recording (see Discography)
1931	R
1933	R
1933	Die Meistersinger von Nürnberg (M)
1934	R
1934	M
1938	Tr
1939	Der fliegende Holländer (H)
1940	H
1941	H
1942	R

== Critical reception ==
Jonathan Carr describes Elmendorff's 1928 recording of Tristan und Isolde as 'orchestrally exemplary' whilst also noting that although it was Toscanini was responsible for fully preparing Bayreuth Festival orchestra to achieve great things in the 1930 production of Tannhäuser, it was Elmendorff who (for contractual reasons) conducted the Bayreuth recording.

Ernest Newman regarded Elmendorff's performance in the 1930 Ring as 'efficient rather than dazzling' - an opinion noted by Frederic Spotts as not uncommon.

In August 1933 Walter Legge attended the Bayreuth Festival in his role as the music critic of the Manchester Guardian newspaper. As well as observing that the Wagner Festival had been transformed into a Hitler festival, with Mein Kampf displacing Mein Leben, Legge heaped scorn on the quality of the conducting which he considers a consequence of German musical protectionism. Lamenting the absence of Toscanini, Legge's review critically slated both Richard Strauss, whose 'conducting days are over' and Elmendorff who Legge damns as 'an artist of but average talent'.

If Elmendorff is the best Wagnerian conductor Germany can produce, we can only sympathise with the intelligent music-lovers who have to live in a land where only German conductors are allowed to appear. It looks as if "German music performed by German artists" were fit only for the German home.

== Discography ==
- 1928 Tristan und Isolde, Richard Wagner, Label: Naxos, 2003
- 1930 Tannhäuser, Wagner, Label: Naxos Records, 2001
- 1942 Götterdämmerung, Wagner, Bayreuth, Label: Music & Arts Program, 2000
- 1943 Otello, Giuseppe Verdi, Chor und Orchester der Staatsoper Berlin, Label: BASF, nd
- 1943 Don Giovanni, Wolfgang Amadeus Mozart, Chor und Orchester der Staatsoper, Dresden, Label: BASF, nd
- 1944 Luisa Miller, Verdi, Dresden State Opera Chorus, Saxon State Orchestra, Label: BASF, nd, reissued on CD by Preiser Records, 2006
