= Josef Metternich =

German opera singer

Josef Metternich (2 June 1915, in Cologne – 21 February 2005, in Feldafing) was a German operatic baritone.

Metternich also appeared at the Royal Opera House in London, La Scala in Milan, and made his debut at the Metropolitan Opera in New York, in La forza del destino, in 1953.

He joined the Munich State Opera in 1954, where he created the role of Johannes Kepler in Hindemith's Die Harmonie der Welt (1957).

Metternich retired in 1971 after performing for more than three decades.

== Sources ==
- Grove Music Online, Noël Goodwin, May 2008.
