= Margarete Klose =

German opera singer

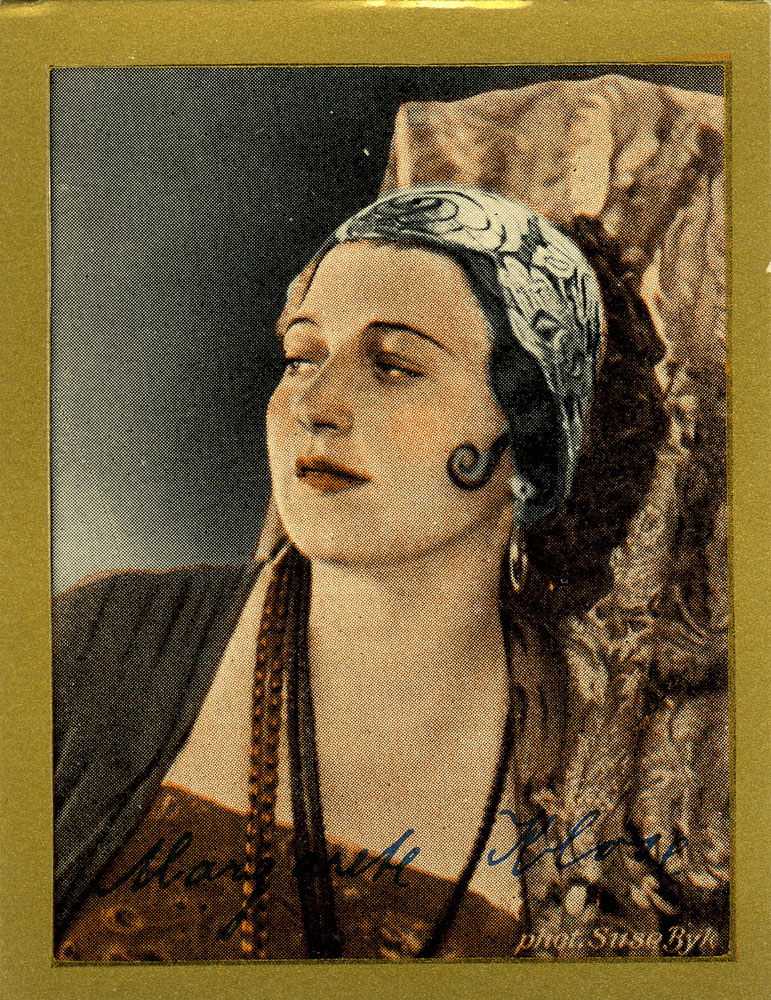
- Klose on a cigarette card, c. 1933

Background information
- Born: Frida Klose; 6 August 1899; Berlin, German Empire
- Died: 14 December 1968 (aged 69) West Berlin
- Genres: Opera
- Occupations: Musician, teacher
- Instrument: Singing
- Years active: 1926–1961
- Formerly of: Mannheim National Theatre; Berlin State Opera; Deutsche Oper Berlin
- Spouse: Walter Bültemann (m. 1928; died 1949)

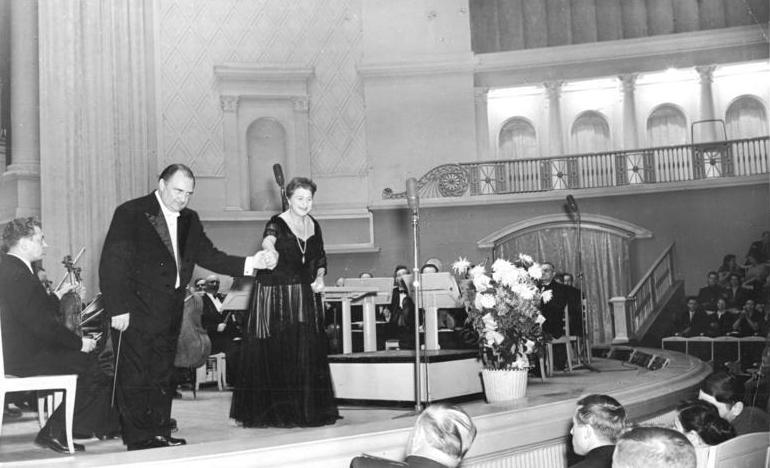
Klose, with Franz Konwitschny

Margarete Klose (6 August 1899 or 1902 – 14 December 1968) was a German operatic dramatic mezzo-soprano.

== Life ==
Klose was born (as Frida Klose) and died in Berlin. She lost her father early in life and had to earn her living as a secretary, until a colleague recommended her to the Klindworth-Scharwenka conservatory, where she got a thorough musical education.

Klose made her début in 1926 at the Theater Ulm in a supporting role of Emmerich Kálmán's operetta Countess Maritza. Her next role was Azucena in Giuseppe Verdi's Il trovatore. For the next three years Klose sang in Ulm and Kassel, before joining the Mannheim National Theatre in 1929.

In 1932, Klose went back to Berlin where she was engaged alternately at Berlin State Opera (1932 to 1949 and 1955 to 1961) and Deutsche Oper Berlin (1949 to 1958).

In addition she was a celebrated guest e.g. at Vienna State Opera, the Royal Opera House Covent Garden, La Scala in Milan, Sächsische Staatsoper Dresden, National Theatre Munich, Hamburg State Opera, Teatro Colón in Buenos Aires, La Monnaie in Brussels, in San Francisco, and Los Angeles.

From 1936 to 1942, Klose regularly sang at the Bayreuth Festival every summer, where she became popular especially in the role of Brangäne in Tristan und Isolde. She also sang at the Richard Wagner-Festival in Sopot (1935) and the Salzburg Festival (1949 and 1955).

"Ach, ich habe sie verloren"
From act 3 of Gluck's Orfeo ed Euridice; Berlin State Opera, Bruno Seidler-Winkler conducting

When the great Wagner soprano Frida Leider gave her farewell concert in Berlin in 1946, Klose was her partner on stage.

In 1961, Klose retired from the stage and concentrated fully on her teaching activities. In the summer she regularly gave master classes at the Salzburg Mozarteum.

In 1968, she died suddenly at the age of 69.

== Significance ==
During the 1930s and 1940s, Klose was considered the leading German mezzo, internationally sought after, especially as a Wagner singer. In addition, she sang a lot of Verdi and Richard Strauss and was famous as a Bach and Lieder singer.

Klose worked with all the great singers and conductors of her time and was a favourite of Wilhelm Furtwängler, who engaged her for his famous last recording, Wagner's Die Walküre in 1954.

== Sources ==
- Branscombe, Peter (1992), "Klose, Margarete" in The New Grove Dictionary of Opera, ed. Stanley Sadie (London) ISBN 0-333-73432-7
- Seeger, Horst, Das große Lexikon der Oper, Herrsching, 1985, ISBN 3-88199-243-X
- Vieten, Jacob: "Margarete Klose. [Discography, pictures, documents]". in: Stimmen, die um die Welt gingen, vol. 74. Münster (Germany) 2003
- Warrack, John and West, Ewan (1992), The Oxford Dictionary of Opera, 782 pages, ISBN 0-19-869164-5
