= Gunnar Graarud =

Norwegian operatic tenor

Gunnar Graarud (1 June 1886 – 6 December 1960) was a Norwegian operatic tenor.

== Early life ==
Gunnar Graarud was born in Holmestrand, Norway on 1 June 1886. He studied engineering at the Karlsruhe Institute of Technology. After his natural beautiful singing voice was discovered, he studied singing privately in Berlin with Frederick Husler, then head of the voice department at the Stern Conservatory, and baritone Konrad von Zawilowski.

== Career ==
After making his debut in 1919 at the Pfalztheater, he was a resident artist at the Mannheim National Theatre from 1920-1922. After this he was a leading artist at the Berlin Volksoper from 1922-1925; the Deutsche Oper Berlin in 1925-1926; and the Hamburg State Opera from 1926 to 1929. At the latter theater he created the role of the blind judge in the world premiere of Erich Wolfgang Korngold's Das Wunder der Heliane in 1927.

Graarud performed the title role in George Frideric Handel's Serse at the Göttingen International Handel Festival in 1924. In 1928 he appeared at the Paris Opera in the roles of Tristan in Tristan und Isolde and Siegmund in Die Walküre. With the exception of the year 1929, he sang annually at the Bayreuth Festival from 1927 to 1931; portraying such roles as Siegmund, Tristan, and the title roles in Parsifal and Siegfried. As part of the 1928 Bayreuth cast of Tristan und Isolde, he participated in the first recording of that opera.

From 1929 to 1937 Graarud was a resident artist at the Vienna State Opera. In 1931 he gave concerts of music by Richard Wagner in Paris and Brussels, and in 1932 he sang Tristan for his debut at the Opéra de Monte-Carlo, He made two guest appearances at the Salzburg Festival; portraying Aegisthus in Richard Strauss's Elektra (1934) and the title role of Hugo Wolf's Der Corregidor (1936). In 1936 he portrayed Herod in Salome at the Royal Opera House, Covent Garden with Hans Knappertsbusch conducting.

== Later life and death ==
After retiring from the stage he was a member of the voice faculty at the Vienna Academy of Music. One of his notable pupils was bass Otto Edelmann.

Gunnar Graarud died in Stuttgart, Germany on 6 December 1960.

== Literature ==
- Klaus Ulrich Spiegel: "Repräsentant eines Ideals - Der stilbewusste Tenor Gunnar Graarud" - Edition HAfG Acoustics Hamburg 2013
