= Ferdinand Frantz =

German opera singer

Ferdinand Frantz (February 8, 1906 in Kassel – May 26, 1959 in Munich), was a German operatic bass-baritone. He was well known in his time for his performances in the operas of Richard Wagner.

Fond of music as a boy, he joined a choral society in Kassel and at 16 was chosen to take a small solo part. Four years of vocal training ensued. Frantz's first role was in the Kassel Staatstheater in 1927, playing Hermann Ortel in a production of Wagner's Die Meistersinger. He sang at the Halle Opera House from 1930 to 1932, then in Chemnitz from 1932 to 1937, and then in Hamburg with the Hamburg State Opera from 1937 to 1943. In 1943, he began singing with the Munich State Opera, where he would sing until the year of his death.

Frantz was a guest artist at the Vienna Staatsoper, Semper Oper in Dresden, at La Scala, and Covent Garden. He debuted at the Metropolitan Opera in 1949, portraying Wotan in Wagner's Die Walküre. This role caused some consternation among operagoers: Helen Traubel was to appear as Brünnhilde opposite Frantz's Wotan, and when Traubel could not perform, Frantz's wife, soprano Helena Braun, stepped into the role. This novelty of a married couple portraying a father and daughter was covered on the front page of New York newspapers.

He began as a low bass and moved up to bass-baritone. He was best known as Wotan/Wanderer and Hans Sachs. Recordings are available with him in these roles from the late 1940s to the mid-1950s, including two complete Meistersingers as Sachs, one of them (from 1956) magisterially sung by Frantz and conducted by Rudolf Kempe. "Opera" called his Sachs "one of the most impressive of our day". He also left records as Amfortas, Gurnemanz, Friedrich von Telramund, Iago (in German translation), Don Pizarro and Jokanaan, and as bass soloist in Beethoven's 9th Symphony. An anthology of operatic arias and monologues is also available.
