= Andrea Breth =

German theatre and opera director

Andrea Breth (born 31 October 1952) is a stage director. From 1999 to 2019 she was in-house director at the Burgtheater in Vienna and also directed for the Salzburg Festival.

== Biography ==
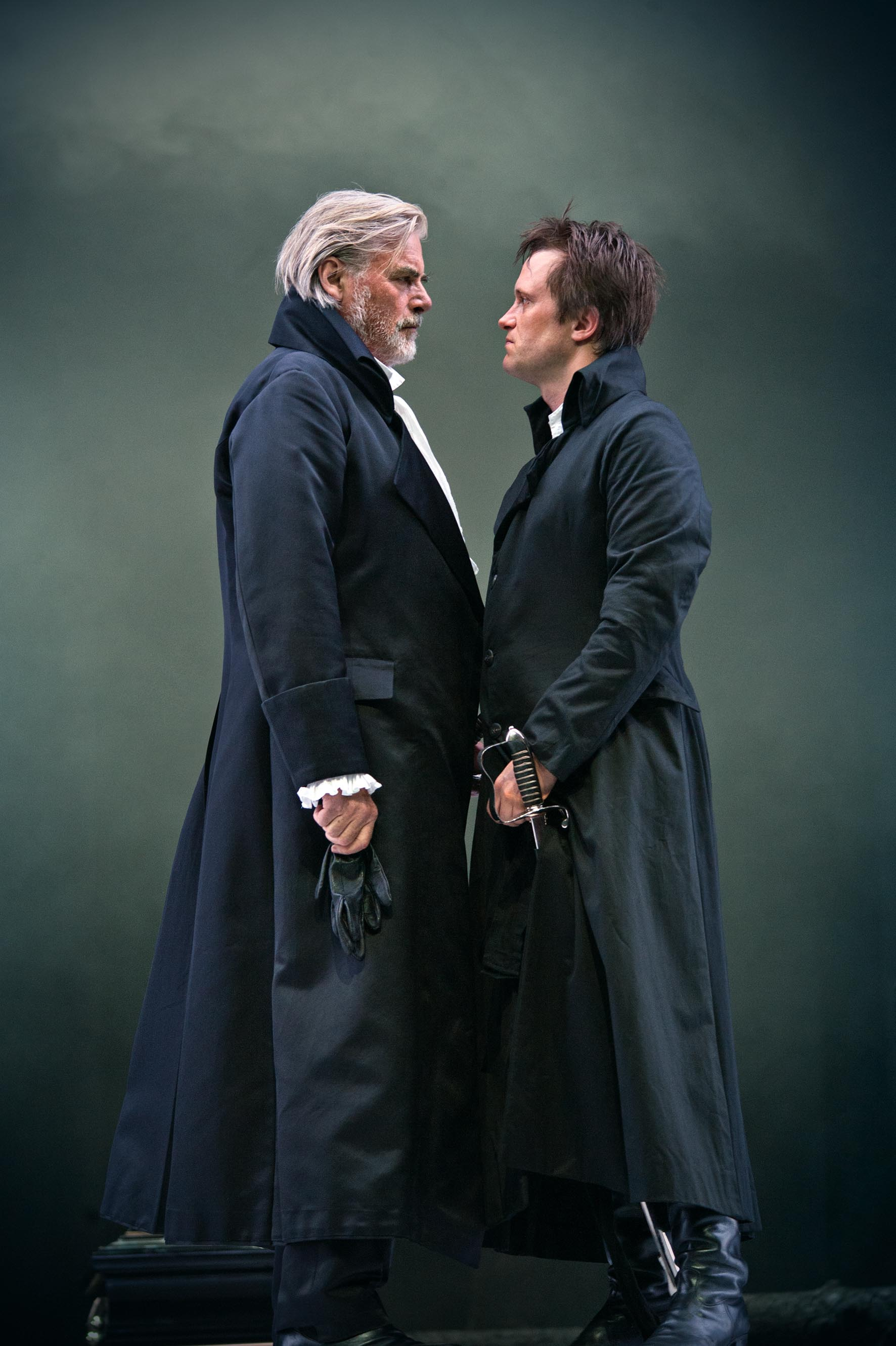
Salzburg Festival 2012 – Prinz Friedrich von Homburg

Born in Rieden am Forggensee, Germany, Andrea Breth grew up in Darmstadt. Breth studied German and English language and literature in the University of Heidelberg from 1971 to 1973. Her first directorial engagements took her to Bremen, Wiesbaden, Hamburg and Berlin (including 1981 Lessing's Emilia Galotti at the Freie Volksbühne Berlin), the Zürich Schauspielakademie and the Theater am Neumarkt in Zürich. From 1983 to 1985, she was director at Theater Freiburg. Her production of Lorca's The House of Bernarda Alba won her the first of a number of invitations to the Berlin Theatertreffen in 1985. In the same year, Theater heute voted her Director of the Year. From 1986 to 1989 Breth worked at the Schauspielhaus Bochum. Green's Southand Gorki's The Last Ones saw Andrea Breth win her second invitation to the Berlin Theatertreffen. In 1990 and 1992 she directed Kleist's Der zerbrochene Krug at the Burgtheater and O'Caseys The End of the Beginning at the Akademietheater.

From 1992 to 1997, she was an artistic director at the Schaubühne Berlin, where her productions of Vampilov's Last Summer in Chulimsk, Ibsen's Hedda Gabler and Chekhov's Uncle Vanya gained her yet another invitation to the Berlin Theatertreffen. From 1999 to 2006, she was a resident director at the Burgtheater, staging Horváth's Der jüngste Tag, Kleist's Das Käthchen von Heilbronn, Friedrich Schiller's Maria Stuart and Don Carlos, Albert Ostermaier's Letzter Aufruf and Nach den Klippen, Tennessee Williams' Cat on a Hot Tin Roof, Anton Chekhov's The Cherry Orchard and Lessing's Minna von Barnhelm. Her directorial work at the Burgtheater from 2009 onwards included Motortown by Simon Stephens, Quay West by Bernard-Marie Koltès, Zwischenfälle (with scenes from Courteline, Cami and Charms), Kleist's Prinz Friedrich von Homburg in a co-production with the Salzburg Festival, Shakespeare's Hamlet, This Story of You by John Hopkins, Harold Pinter's The Birthday Party (in co-operation with the Salzburg Festival) and finally, Long Day's Journey into Night by Eugene O'Neill. She was once again invited to the Berlin Theatertreffen with Lessing's Emilia Galotti and Schiller's Don Carlos.

Breth also directed Schnitzler's Das weite Land and Crime and Punishment by Fyodor Dostoyevsky at the Salzburg Festival. In 2009, she directed Albert Ostermaier's Blaue Spiegel at the Berliner Ensemble and Kleist's Der zerbrochne Krug at the Ruhrtriennale. In 2011, she directed Isaak Babel's Marija at the Düsseldorfer Schauspielhaus, in 2013 Ibsen's John Gabriel Borkman at the Schauspiel Frankfurt and in 2014, Pinter's The Caretaker at the Residenztheater in Munich. Her work for opera from 2000 onwards includes Gluck's Orfeo ed Euridice at the Leipzig Opera, Smetana's The Bartered Bride and Jakob Lenz by Wolfgang Rihm at the Stuttgart State Opera, Bizet's Carmen at the Styriarte Festival in Graz, Tchaikovsky's Eugene Onegin at the Salzburg Festival, Janáček's Katya Kabanova and La Traviata by Giuseppe Verdi at the Théâtre de la Monnaie in Brussels, Lulu and Wozzeck by Alban Berg, Medea by Luigi Cherubini at the Schiller Theater of the Berlin State Opera and Giuseppe Verdi's Macbeth at De Nationale Opera in Amsterdam.

In the 2018/19 season, Breth directed Die Ratten by Gerhart Hauptmann at the Akademietheater and Jakob Lenz by Wolfgang Rihm at the festival of Aix.

She was Professor of Directing at the University of Performing Arts Ernst Busch in Berlin.

== Honours ==
Breth won the German Critics’ Prize in 1986, the Fritz Kortner Prize in 1987, the Nestroy Theatre Prize for Best Director in 2003 for Lessing's Emilia Galotti, and the Berlin Theater Prize in 2006. She won then again the Nestroy Theatre Prize for Zwischenfälle in 2011 and 2016 for John Hopkin's This Story of Yours. She also won the Schiller Prize of the City of Marbach in 2015 and Der Faust award in 2015 in the Musical Theatre Direction category for Jakob Lenz.

She is a member of the Akademie der Darstellenden Künste in Frankfurt am Main, the Academy of Arts, Berlin, as well as the Bayerische Akademie der Schönen Künste and the Order Pour le Mérite. She is also the holder of the Austrian Cross of Honour for Science and Art 1st Class and the Grand Cross of the Order of Merit of the Federal Republic of Germany. Nestroy award for her life work. She won the Joana Maria Gorvin Prize 2020.

== See also ==
- Andrea Breth by Klaus Dermutz, Fischer Taschenbuch Verlag, 1995 ISBN 978-3-596-12400-8
