= Rail Travel Card =

Credit card

The Rail Travel Card was a credit card administered by the Rail Travel Credit Agency headquartered at Chicago Union Station (room 436) to facilitate leisure and business travel by rail, possibly modeled on the air travel card. It was accepted by most major railroads, the prominent exceptions being New Haven and Southern Pacific.

== History ==
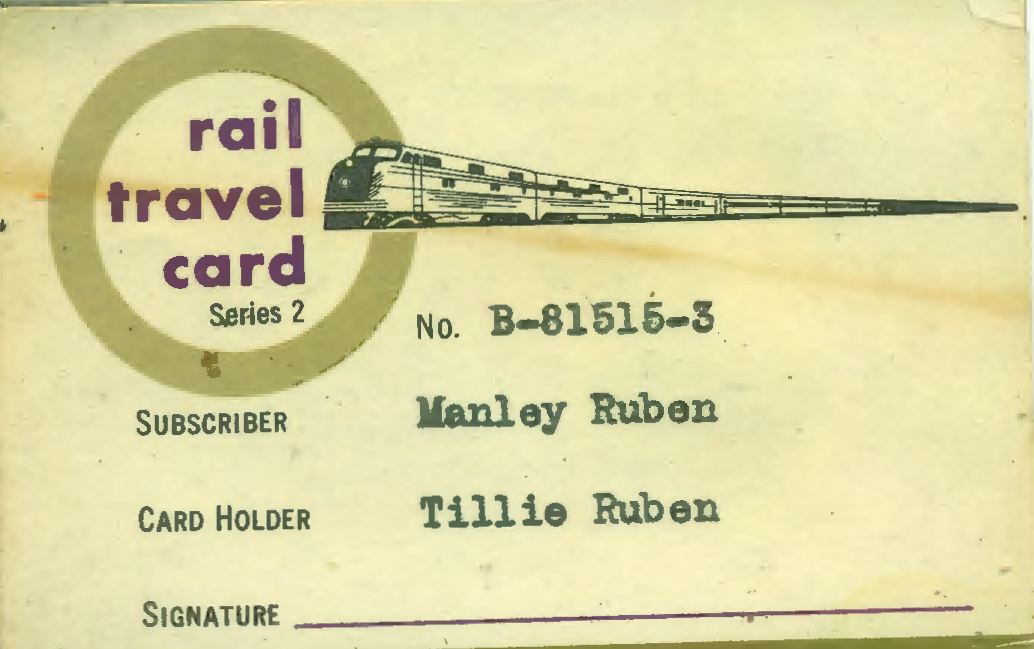
Rail Travel Card

In the immediate post World War II era railroads began considering various plans to encourage rail travel and in September 1946 did a survey of 20,000 individuals and businesses. The overwhelming preference was for a charge card accepted by all railroads. Provision was made if travel included the use of railroads that did not on their own accept the card that it would still be honored provided travel started on one of the railroads that did honor it. In announcing its introduction H.B. Rogers of the Erie Railroad explained "For more than a year ... the railroads, have been discussing methods for making travel easier and more convenient. This credit plan will help to do it".

On April 1, 1947 the card became effective, initially honored by 45 railroads.

Promotional materials stated "This card will be honored by participating railroads for all rail and Pullman transportation (except commutation) and meals, and beverages where state laws permit." Ticket purchase could be via mail order (sending the card to the local participating railroad ticket office which by return mail sent tickets plus returned the card) or at stations; only some railroads accepted it for purchasing tickets on board. It was also honored by automobile rental agencies (including Avis and Hertz) along with many leading hotels, motels, restaurants and national park concessionaires. It required no deposit, service charge or annual fee. Monthly billing was done by each individual railroad through the agency.

By early 1950 it was being actively promoted by various railroads. Its acceptance gradually expanded during the 1950s, reaching 57 by April 1958. The number of railroads accepting it dwindled by 1967 to 28 (in part a consequence of the industry trend toward consolidation via mergers). By the mid-1960s J. David Ingles reports among the railroads that had dropped out of the program included Chicago & Eastern Illinois, Rock Island, Kansas City Southern and Louisville & Nashville. It was accepted by Amtrak through the mid-1970s.

Another initiative to encourage rail travel begun September 1, 1947 was the Rail Traveloan Service involving loans through local banks for travel and associated expenses on some 70 railroads including a number (such as Southern Pacific) that did not honor the Rail Travel Card.

== Other railroad charge cards ==
Jan. 27, 1947 the Chesapeake & Ohio (C&O) introduced the first railroad credit card in the United States. By late February 1947 the Missouri–Kansas–Texas Railroad (KATY) introduced its own credit card, which it also claimed as being the first. Beginning in 1954 the New Haven Railroad offered its own credit card, the New Haven Railroad Rail Charge Card. It continued to be honored until the New Haven merged with the Penn Central January 1, 1969. It may have been honored for a brief period by the Penn Central after the merger; subsequently they shifted over to accepting the Rail Travel Card. Baltimore & Ohio (B&O) also introduced its own credit card in 1954.

All four cards generally covered meals, beverages, hotels and auto rentals. As with Rail Travel Card, C&O and KATY arranged so their cards would be honored for the use of travel that started on their systems even if it included continuing on other railroads; in the case of the KATY this was subsequently done via an arrangement with the railroads that accepted Rail Travel Card. By the late-1950s C&O, KATY and B&O had joined the Rail Travel Card program and apparently discontinued their own cards in favor of it.
