= Anny Schlemm =

German opera singer (1929–2026)

- Schlemm, in the 1950s
- Born: 22 February 1929; Neu-Isenburg, People's State of Hesse, Germany
- Died: 20 August 2026 (aged 97); Graz, Styria, Austria
- Occupations: Soprano; Mezzo-soprano; Contralto
- Organizations: Komische Oper Berlin; Cologne Opera; Oper Frankfurt
- Title: Kammersängerin
- Awards: Joana Maria Gorvin Prize
- Website: annyschlemm.de

Anny Schlemm (22 February 1929 – 20 August 2026) was a German soprano and later mezzo-soprano and contralto. She was a member of the Komische Oper Berlin from 1949, working with Walter Felsenstein. She premiered one of her signature roles there, Boulotte in Offenbach's Barbe-bleue in 1963, performing it 257 times until 1992. From 1952, Schlemm was simultaneously for decades a member of the Oper Frankfurt: She performed major roles such as Klytaemnestra in Elektra by R. Strauss, internationally as a guest. Between 1946 and 2003, she appeared in 135 roles, including world premieres such as the Bride in Fortner's Bluthochzeit and Cage's Europeras.

== Life and career ==
Schlemm was born in Neu-Isenburg on 22 February 1929; her parents ran a hair salon there. Her father, Friedrich Schlemm, also sang in the chorus of the Oper Frankfurt. He was sent to a voice teacher in Frankfurt by the tenor Franz Völker who also lived in Neu-Isenburg. He then moved with the family to Halle to be a chorister at the Halle Opera House, while his wife worked in the administration of the opera house. Schlemm studied voice in Halle, and in Berlin with Erna Westenberger.

=== Soprano ===
Schlemm made her debut in 1946 at the Halle Opera, as Bastienne in Mozart's Bastien und Bastienne, where she soon appeared as Nanette in Lortzing's Der Wildschütz. In 1949 she joined both the Staatsoper Berlin and the Komische Oper Berlin (KOB), At the KOB, she participated in productions by Walter Felsenstein; she said later that it was he who told her not only to sing and act the character and play the character but to be the character. Her roles included Cherubino in Mozart's Le nozze di Figaro, the title role of Smetana's The Bartered Bride, Micaela in Bizet's Carmen, and Desdemona in Verdi's Otello, portrayed without the cliché of being a victim but as a self-determined woman.

In 1963 Schlemm sang one of her signature roles there, Boulotte in Offenbach's Barbe-bleue, which she would perform 257 times during her career. The production was filmed by DEFA in 1973. A reviewer noted in 2021:

The heroine Boulotte is engagingly portrayed by the talented soprano turned mezzo, Anny Schlemm. Schlemm's portrait of a sexpot peasant girl is executed with assured comic timing. Her lush and somewhat round and nearly overripe tone seems to be bursting at the seams and enhances her portrait of barely contained lustiness."

In 1966 Schlemm portrayed Elvira in Mozart's Don Giovanni alongside György Melis in the title role, seen by a reviewer from The Guardian as "calculating and hypocritical". The production was filmed in black and white and later reissued on CD, illustrating the director's insistence on "naturalistic ensemble acting" that "revolutionised people's perceptions of opera" at the time. Schlemm toured with the company to Moscow, Stockholm and Prague.

Schlemm was also a member of the Cologne Opera in the 1951/52 season. She participated there in 1957 in the world premiere of Fortner's Bluthochzeit, as the Bride. In 1952, she became also a member of the Oper Frankfurt, engaged by Christoph von Dohnányi. Her first role was the Daughter in Hindemith's Cardillac. Her roles also included Susanna in Mozart's Le nozze di Figaro, Elvira, Agathe in Weber's Der Freischütz, and the title roles in Puccini's Manon Lescaut, and in Der Rosenkavalier and Arabella, both by R. Strauss. Schlemm took part in the world premieres of Wimberger's Dame Kobold there in 1964. Of the 135 characters that she portrayed in her career, 58 were performed in Frankfurt.

Schlemm made guest appearances at other opera houses in Germany and abroad. She performed in Germany at the Hamburg State Opera, Staatsoper Dresden, Staatsoper Stuttgart and the Bavarian State Opera in Munich. In 1954 she appeared as Zerlina in Don Giovanni at the Glyndebourne Festival. She sang as a guest at the Teatro di San Carlo in Naples in 1954, also at the Paris Opéra, and the Holland Festival, among others. In 1956 she took part in guest performance of the Hamburg State Opera at the Edinburgh Festival as Pamina in Mozart's Die Zauberflöte. directed by Günther Rennert.

=== Mezzo-soprano ===
Later, as her voice darkened, Schlemm took mezzo-soprano roles such as Klytaemnestra in Elektra and Herodias in Salome, both by R. Strauss, performed at the Dutch National Opera in 1978. She appeared as Klytaemnestra more than 175 times. At the Bayreuth Festival, she appeared as Mary in Der fliegende Holländer from 1978 to 1985, directed by Harry Kupfer as a compelling character study. In 1981 she was successful at the Cologne Opera as Kostelnicka in Janáček's Jenůfa. She appeared as Madelon in Giordano's Andrea Chénier in 1984 at the Royal Opera House in London. She portrayed Klytaemnestra again in Frankfurt in 1988, in Stuttgart in 1989 and in Toronto in 1991.

=== Contralto ===
Schlemm's contralto roles included Ulrica in Verdi's Un ballo in maschera, Mrs. Quickly in Falstaff, and the Mother in Bluthochzeit. She took part in the world premiere of Cage's Europeras at the Oper Frankfurt in 1989. She appeared at the Vienna Volksoper in 1990 as Palmatica in Millöcker's Der Bettelstudent, at the Berlin State Opera in 1992 as Filipjewna in Tchaikovsky's Eugene Onegin, and at the Vienna State Opera in 1993 as Countess in Pique Dame. In 1994 she returned to the Komische Oper Berlin as Nurse in Berthold Goldschmidt's Der gewaltige Hahnrei, invited by director Harry Kupfer with whom she had worked in Bayreuth. From 1996 she portrayed at the Semperoper in Dresden the Old Buryja in Jenůfa, and at Halle Opera as Babricha in Rimsky-Korsakov's The Tale of Tsar Saltan. She was named an honorary member of the house on the occasion.

Her last new role in Berlin was Public Opinion in Offenbach's Orpheus in der Unterwelt in 1999. Her last role in Frankfurt was Mamma Lucia in Mascagni's Cavalleria rusticana in the 2002/03 season. She performed even longer at the Vienna State Opera, as the Old Buryja in Jenůfa until 7 October 2003.

=== Personal life ===
Schlemm was married to the conductor Wolfgang Rennert. They had a son, Uli Rennert, who became a jazz musician, composer and academic teacher. She was named an honorary citizen of Neu-Isenburg in 1999.

Since 2007, Schlemm lived in Graz, where her son lived and taught. At that time she left her archive to the Franz-Völker-Anny-Schlemm-Gesellschaft in Neu-Isenburg. She regularly returned to her hometown for an annual public reading of Christmas stories at the Protestant church at the market square, a tradition between 2001 and 2014.

Schlemm died in a senior citizen's home in Graz on 20 August 2026, at the age of 97.

== Awards and honours ==
- 1963 Kammersängerin (Oper Frankfurt)
- 2000 Joana Maria Gorvin Prize

Schlemm was an honorary member of the Halle Opera, the KOB and the Oper Frankfurt.

Schlemm's hometown established the Anny Schlemm Prize in 2009 to be awarded every fifth year to a promising young opera singer. In 2010, the first recipient was mezzo-soprano Paula Murrihy, followed by Julia Dawson and Bianca Andrew. The prize was abandoned in 2024. On the occasion of her 97th birthday, the town held an exhibition about the career of her and Völker, ending with a concert.

== Recordings ==
Schlemm recorded in 1949 the role of Rosalinde in Die Fledermaus by J. Strauss, alongside Peter Anders as her husband Eisenstein, Helmut Krebs as Alfred, Rita Streich as Adele, the RIAS Kammerchor and the RIAS-Symphonie-Orchester, conducted by Ferenc Fricsay. A reviewer noted that she sounded more mature than her 22 years then and was "absolutely splendid in Klänge der Heimat".

In 1951 she appeared as Oscar in Verdi's Un ballo in maschera (in German) by the Westdeutscher Rundfunk (WDR) conducted by Fritz Busch, with Lorenz Fehenberger as Riccardo, Walburga Wegner as Amelia, Dietrich Fischer-Dieskau as Renato and Martha Mödl as Ulrica.

From the Komische Oper Berlin, Felsenstein's production of Mozart's Don Giovanni was filmed with Schlemm as Elvira. In 1973, his version of Offenbach's Barbe-bleue was filmed by DEFA, documenting his direction and Schlemm's presentation of her signature role Boulotte.

In 1978 she recorded the Witch in Humperdinck's Hänsel und Gretel, with the Vienna Philharmonic conducted by Georg Solti, alongside Brigitte Fassbaender as Hänsel, Lucia Popp as Gretel, Walter Berry as the Father, and Edita Gruberová as Taumännchen.

The Bayreuth Holländer was recorded in 1985, with Simon Estes in the title role, Lisbeth Balslev as Senta, Matti Salminen as her father Daland and Robert Schunk as Erik, conducted by Woldemar Nelsson.

Many collections of her recordings have appeared:

- "Anny Schlemm – Oper und Operette (1)". Neu-Isenburg: Franz-Völker-Kreis. 1999. OCLC 1183570959.
- "Anny Schlemm – Oper und Operette (2)". Neu-Isenburg: Franz-Völker-Kreis. 1999. OCLC 1183780852.
- "Anny Schlemm – Oper und Operette / Mozart, Mendelssohn Bartholdy, Puccini, Verdi, Strauss, Künneke, Straus, Fall". Berlin: Friedrich. 2005. OCLC 179751009.
- "Anny Schlemm. Vol. 1, Oper und Lied". Edition Singers of the Past. Icons. 2025. OCLC 1564033532.
- "Anny Schlemm. Vol. 2, Operetten Highlights". Edition Singers of the Past. Icons. 2025. OCLC 1564035013.
- "Anny Schlemm – Oper und Operette in frühen Schallplattenaufnahmen und Live-Mitschnitten". 2005. OCLC 315493010.
