= AirPlus International =

German business payments services company

- Type: Subsidiary
- Industry: Corporate payment system
- Founded: 1989; 37 years ago
- Headquarters: Neu-Isenburg, Germany
- Area served: Worldwide
- Products: Corporate travel management Procurement
- Number of employees: 1,146 (2023)
- Parent: SEB Kort
- Website: airplus.com

AirPlus International GmbH is a global corporate payment provider offering payment and data services for corporate travel management, procurement, and travel trade. Originally a subsidiary of Lufthansa Group, the company was acquired by SEB Kort in July 2024. The company provides business-to-business payment services around business travel payment, accounting, and analysis functions, in particular with by issuing central lodged cards, corporate credit cards, and virtual credit cards.

== History ==
=== Foundation and early years ===
The company's tradition began in the year 1986 with the Air Travel Card (distributed by Lufthansa), now known as the Universal Air Travel Plan (UATP). As a result of being the first credit card, issued since 1936, UATP/AirPlus card numbers start with the card issuer identification number prefix "1".

On 22 December 1989 Lufthansa AirPlus Servicekarten GmbH was registered at the court in Offenbach am Main, Hesse, Germany. By 1993, the AirPlus credit card had 60,000 subscribers and was jointly owned by Aer Lingus, Alitalia, Austrian Airlines, British Airways, Finnair, Iberia, Lufthansa, Sabena and Swissair.

=== Development since 2000 ===
By 2000, AirPlus had enabled exporting of transaction information to SAP R/3 using an SAP module called "Sara" (SAP Airplus Reisekosten-Abrechnungssatz) in the data format "Lars" (Lufthansa Airplus Abrechnungs-Satz). AirPlus International Ltd is a wholly owned subsidiary based in the United Kingdom and founded in 2002. In 2005, AirPlus launched AIDA (AirPlus Integrated Data and Acceptance), a virtual credit card solution, whereby sixteen-digit payment card numbers are generated under the Mastercard prefix, which can be used for a limit number of transactions.

In 2013 Hotel Reservation Service (HRS) enabled automated payment to hotels using automatically generated virtual credit card numbers issued by AirPlus. As of 2015 Airplus was handling 1.3 million virtual credit card transactions per year. In 2017 the company handled payments covering 18 million travel tickets.

In 2017, the managing director Patrick Diemer predicted that most business travel processes would move to smartphones. As of 2017 AirPlus was working on implementation of the strong customer authentication requirements for corporate cards. During 2018 Mastercard and AirPlus launched a joint marketing campaign called "Virtual Cards: Accepted!". During 2021, all previous AIDA virtual credit cards were set to expire on 31 July 2021 and be replaced by a new virtual credit card system.

In the financial year 2019 Airplus had made a profit of €2 million, followed in 2020 by a loss of €146 million attributed to the reduction in business travel because of COVID-19 distribution. Subsequently, at the beginning of 2021, Lufthansa had planned to sell AirPlus for €1 billion along with parts of Lufthansa Technik. As of December 2021, Lufthansa had cancelled its previous plan to sell the majority of Airplus as a consequence of the COVID-19 pandemic in Germany. Lufthansa previously planned to keep open the open of partially selling LSG Sky Chefs or AirPlus at a later stage.

=== Aquisition by SEB ===
SEB Group announced its intention to acquire AirPlus from Lufthansa Group on June 21, 2023 for around 450 million euros ($491 million), pending regulator approvals. The sale was completed in July 2024.

In August 2026, AirPlus International GmbH was merged into its parent company, SEB Kort Bank AB. Its German operations continued as SEB Kort Germany, Branch of SEB Kort Bank AB, while AirPlus remained in use as a corporate payment brand.
