= Herbert Rösler =

German artist, writer and designer

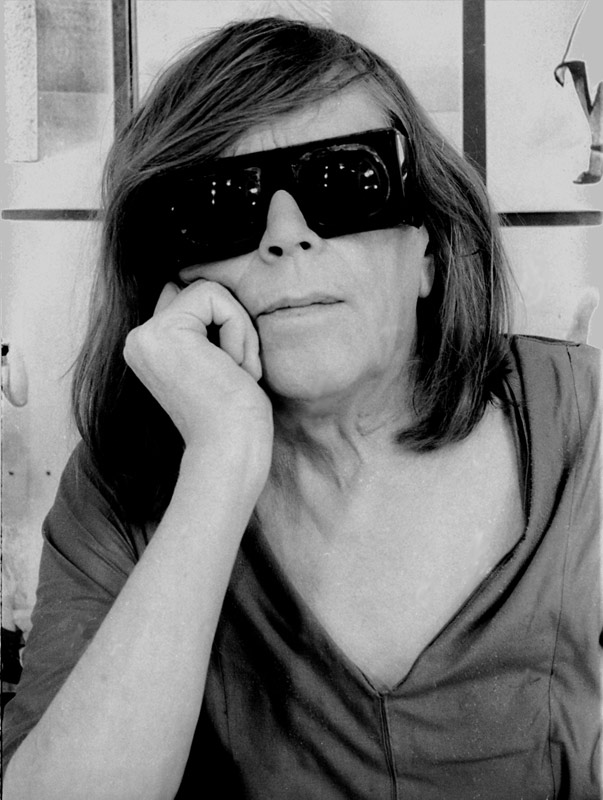
- Herbert Rösler, 2004
- Born: 15 July 1924; Stuttgart, Germany
- Died: 11 November 2006 (aged 82); Tübingen, Germany
- Known for: Painting, sculpture, fashion, architecture

Herbert Rösler (15 June 1924 – 11 November 2006) was a German artist, writer and designer. He worked as a painter, graphic designer, sculptor, developed models for futuristic architecture, designed clothes, furniture and handcrafted jewelry. Furthermore, he is also known as founder of the Christian work- and housing-community Gruppe 91 (Group 91), their beliefs and lifestyle have similarities to the Jesus movement. Rösler was the creative and spiritual guidance for this community from their beginning in 1968 to the date of his passing in 2006. Artworks of Rösler are on permanent display in the exhibition hall G91-Bau in Tübingen. Besides their cultural engagement, Rösler and his group were also committed to many social projects.

== Life and work ==
=== Youth, War and first employments (1924–1967) ===
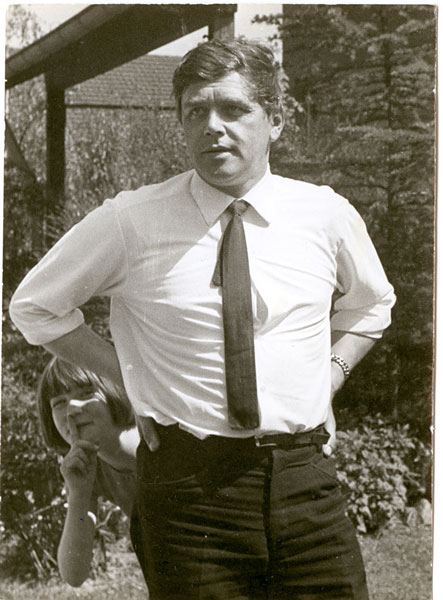
Herbert Rösler, 1968

Herbert Rösler was born as the youngest of three children. His father came from Neutrebbin and was a certified forester and estate manager, his mother was from Franconia. Around 1938 he began training as a technical merchant for his first employment.

By the age of 18 he voluntarily joined the military and was stationed with a tank battalion in Africa. As a prisoner of war he was brought to the United States where he had to work on the field and in the woods, in his free time he began with drawing. Along with other detained soldiers he was dismissed in France where he and his group were captured and imprisoned again. In 1948 he managed to escape and made his way back to Germany. Rösler was changed by the war and from there on considered himself as a pacifist.

After the war, he worked as a decorator for Polydor, designed movie posters for local cinemas and started his own advertising agency. In 1948 he met Ischabell Nadler (5 March 1930 – 13 March 2015), they married in 1951 and had two children. Rösler moved from Stuttgart to Cologne in 1960 where he became head of the set design department for the record label Electrola. As part of this job he was in charge of the stage arrangements for a Maria Callas Tournee, the Ansbach Bach Week, the Bayreuth Festival and the German Schlager-Festival in Baden-Baden. During his time in Cologne, Rösler met Wolf Vostell who was also working for the Electrola as a cover art designer. After a few years in the Electrola around 1964, Rösler and an associate bought an old candy-factory which they renovated as a studio for advertisement photography. In 1966 Rösler suffered a stroke and the studio was sold again. After his recovery he worked as a freelancing graphic designer, caricaturist, exhibition architect and was responsible for the pagination of the German Physicians Journal.

=== Beginning of the Gruppe 91 (1968–1972) ===
Besides his work, Rösler further pursued his passion to draw and engaged in meditation. In the night of 18/19 September 1968, Rösler experienced a vision that marks an important spiritual turning point in his life. He quit his job and opened his house for young people from all over Germany. This is how the Gruppe 91 was founded, it is named after city-district number to that time of Ostheim (part of Kalk, Cologne) where the community lived. In February 1972 the group was featured in the nationwide broadcast documentary Pop und Weihrauch (Pop and Frankincense) of the Swiss director Roman Brodmann. The documentary focused on the German Jesus People and other Christian revival groups.

=== Time at Lake Constance (1973–1983) ===
In 1973 the group moved to Southern Germany, first to the Black Forest and from there on to Lake Constance. During their residence in the Black Forrest region, Rösler began with his first large-scale paintings. These paintings were initially exhibited in the farm estate near Lake Constance which the Gruppe 91 inhabited. On an area of about 5000 m^{2} at the Friedrichshafen Fair 1981 his work became accessible to a wider audience in the exhibition called ... für eine neue Welt ... (... for a new world ...). Many exhibitions in the local area around Lake Constance followed like on the Internationale Bodenseemesse (International Lake Constance Fair). In the years from 1977 to 1983 Rösler created hundreds of paintings, plastics, sculptures and design drafts. Rösler was the empowering and inspiring guide for the members of his group, he often provided the drafts and they implemented it.

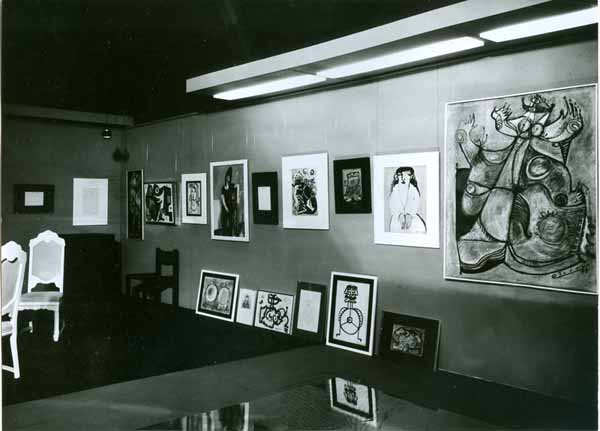
Gallery at Lake Constance, 1976

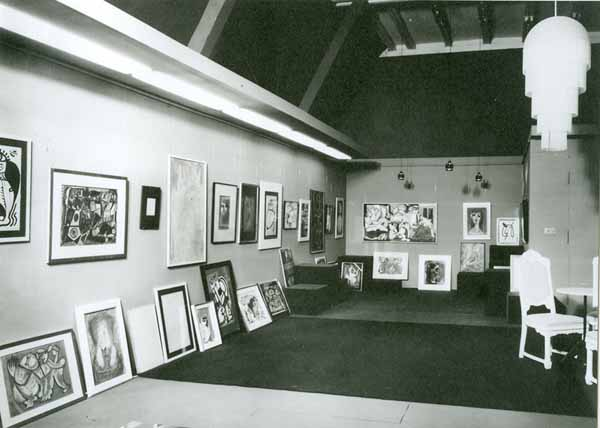
Gallery in the farm estate at Lake Constance, 1977

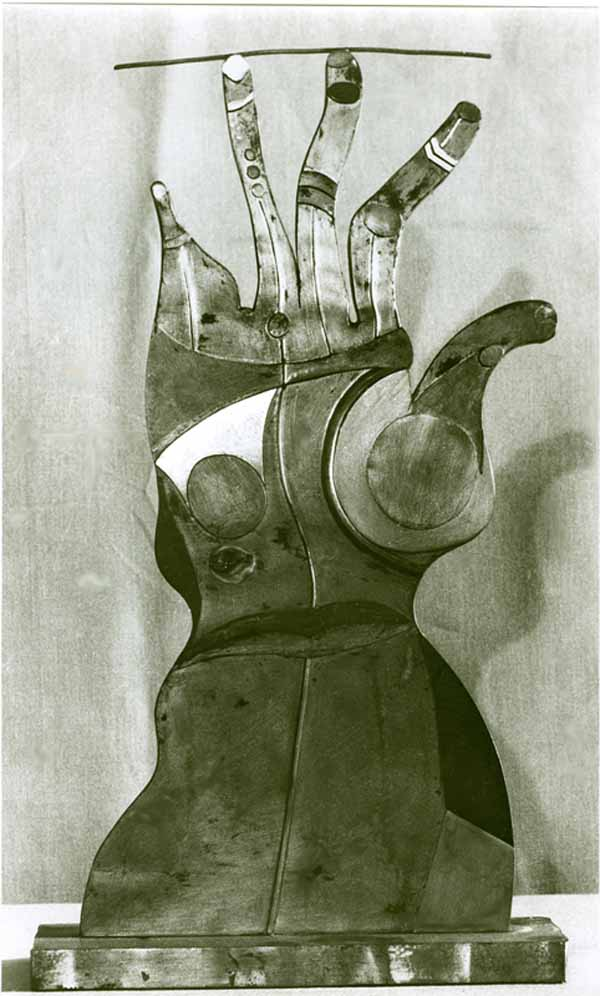
Handsculpture from various metals, 1994

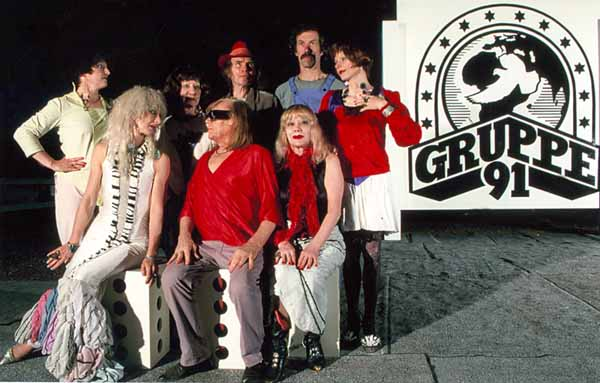
Gruppe 91, 2003

=== Era Tübingen (1983–2006) ===
On the way back from Munich on 18 June 1983, Herbert Rösler was involved in a serious car accident where he lost 90% of his eyesight. He was hospitalized and treated over several months in a specialized eye clinic in Tübingen. During his recovery he dictated the book Für eine neue Welt (For a new world). The book features prose, poetry, drawings and photographs of the group, it was self-published in 1985. Before the end of 1983 the Gruppe 91 also moved to Tübingen. The majority of Rösler's work was created between 1984 and 2006. From 1991 to 2000 his work was displayed in a gallery near the Steinlach. Since then it is exhibited in the G91-Bau which was an old construction hall for tanks, transformed and redesigned after Rösler's drafts. In 2002 a local newspaper featured an article about Herbert Rösler and the Gruppe 91 entitled "Jetzt können wir sagen Chadasch" ("Now we can say Chadasch"). This gave birth to the self chosen titling for Rösler's style of art Chadasch which is the Hebrew word for new. Since his passing in 2006, members of the Gruppe 91 still live by Rösler's spirit and carry on his artistic legacy in the G91-Bau and further local exhibitions.

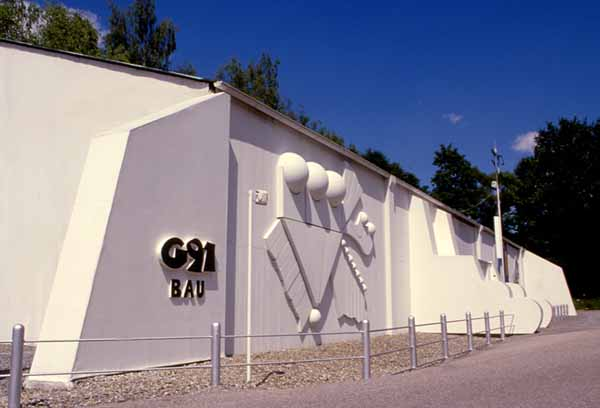
G91-Bau, Tübingen

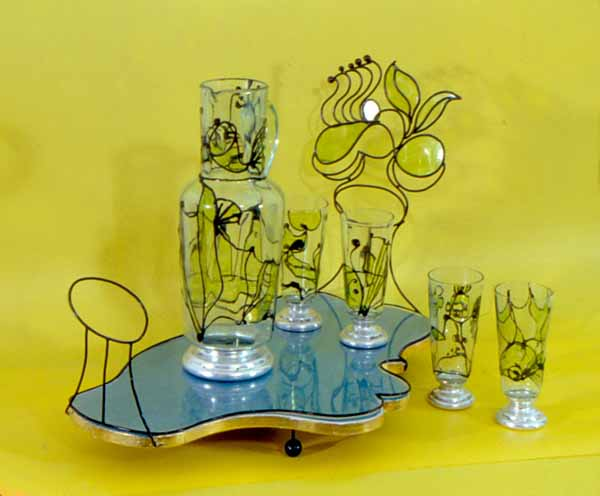
Serving tray

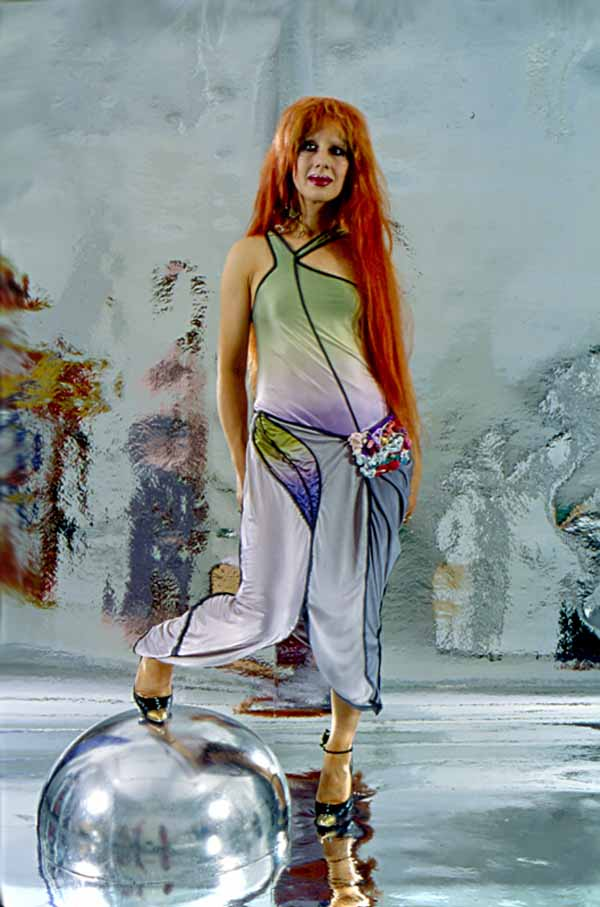
Fashion

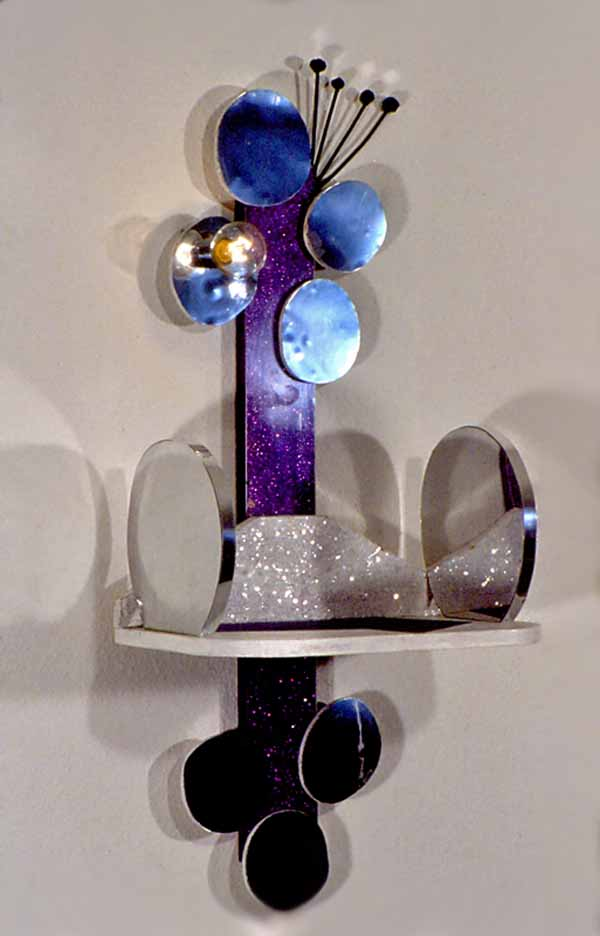
Shelf
