= Anja Silja =

German soprano (born 1940)

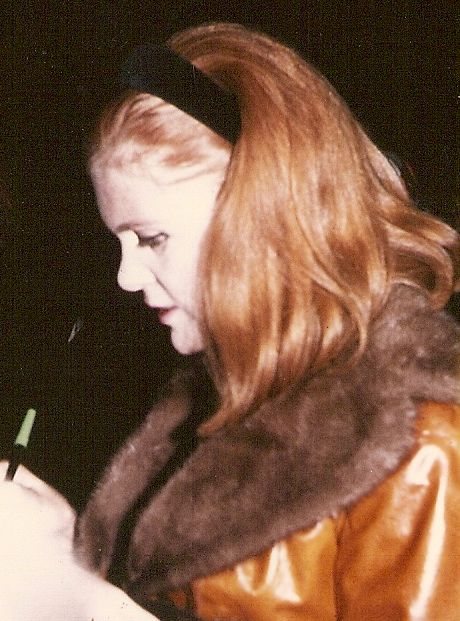
- Silja in 1968
- Born: 17 April 1940 (age 86); Berlin, Germany
- Occupation: Opera singer (soprano)
- Years active: 1956–present

Anja Silja Regina Langwagen (pronounced [ˈanja ˈzɪlja], born 17 April 1940) is a German operatic soprano.

== Biography ==
Born in Berlin, Silja began her operatic career at a very early age, with her grandfather, Egon Friedrich Maria Anders van Rijn, as her voice teacher. She sang Rosina in Rossini's The Barber of Seville in Braunschweig in 1956, followed by Micaëla in Bizet's Carmen and Zerbinetta in Ariadne auf Naxos by Richard Strauss.

She had a breakthrough in 1959 as the Queen of Night in Mozart's Die Zauberflöte at the Vienna State Opera, conducted by Karl Böhm, and also at the Aix-en-Provence Festival. France-Soir dubbed her "a second Callas." Other early roles included Leonora in Verdi's Il trovatore, Santuzza in Mascagni's Cavalleria rusticana, the four heroines of Offenbach's Les contes d'Hoffmann, Konstanze in Mozart's Die Entführung aus dem Serail, and Fiordiligi in Mozart's Così fan tutte.

She made her debut in 1960 at the Bayreuth Festival, as Senta in Der fliegende Holländer. At Bayreuth (until 1967), she also sang Elsa von Brabant in Lohengrin (opposite Astrid Varnay), both Venus and Elisabeth in Tannhäuser, Eva in Die Meistersinger von Nürnberg, Freia in Das Rheingold and Waldvogel in Siegfried, among others. Outside Bayreuth, the soprano appeared in Wieland Wagner's productions of Salome by Strauss, Wagner's Tristan und Isolde, Die Walküre and Siegfried (as Brünnhilde), Elektra by Strauss, Beethoven's Fidelio, Verdi's Otello, Alban Berg's Lulu and Wozzeck (conducted by Pierre Boulez). Of her Salome, Harold Rosenthal wrote in Opera in 1968:

Anja Silja's performance was a tour-de-force. Her voice is not beautiful by any stretch of the imagination, but it is clearly projected, and every phrase carries its overtones—psychological not musical—which suggest the child-like degenerate, over-sexed princess in all too clear a manner. Her nervous, almost thin body is never still; she rolls on her stomach and on her back; she crawls, she slithers, she leaps, she kneels…. There is no denying that this is one of the great performances of our time.

Additional new roles in the 1960s were Jenny Smith in Weill's Aufstieg und Fall der Stadt Mahagonny), Lady Macbeth in Verdi's Macbeth, Violetta Valéry in Verdi's La traviata, first Liù, then the title role in Puccini's Turandot, Lucy in Menotti's The Telephone, Cassandre in Les troyens (opposite Jon Vickers) and Renata in The Fiery Angel. She appeared at the Oper Frankfurt, in Toulouse, Paris, Turin, Naples, Stuttgart, Zürich, Barcelona, Geneva, the Netherlands, Budapest, London (Royal Festival Hall and Royal Opera House), San Francisco Opera (her American debut, in 1968, as Salome), and Chicago. Her first Lady Macbeth, in 1967, was conducted by Christoph von Dohnányi, with whom she had a long relationship, including a marriage that produced three children. They divorced in the 1990s, during Dohnányi's tenure with the Cleveland Orchestra.

Silja continued her career with appearances at Trieste, the Edinburgh Festival (Lulu, 1966), the Salzburg Festival, Metropolitan Opera (Fidelio and Salome, 1972), Paris (Schoenberg's Erwartung, under Sir Georg Solti), Berlin, Cologne (La fanciulla del West), Vienna (world premiere of Einem's Kabale und Liebe) and Brussels. Other new roles in this period were Emilia Marty in The Makropoulos Case, Leonora in Verdi's La forza del destino, Médée, Die lustige Witwe, Carmen (staged by Jean-Pierre Ponnelle), La juive, Katya Kabanova, Tosca, Tatiana in Eugene Onegin, and Die Königin von Saba (conducted by Julius Rudel).

In the 1980s, Silja added Lady Macbeth of the Mtsensk District (opposite Chester Ludgin), La Cubana, Regan in Lear, Prinz Orlofsky in Die Fledermaus (with Karita Mattila and Judith Blegen, staged by Maurice Béjart), the Kostelnička in Jenůfa (at the Glyndebourne Festival), Grete in Der ferne Klang, and the Nurse in Die Frau ohne Schatten (opposite Dame Gwyneth Jones as Barak's Wife).

Silja made her debut as a stage director in 1990 at Brussels with Lohengrin. She then assumed the roles of Agave in The Bassarids (at Carnegie Hall), Ortrud in Lohengrin (in Robert Wilson's production), Herodias in Salome, Anna I in Die sieben Todsünden, Klytämnestra in Elektra, Jocasta in Œdipus rex (opposite René Kollo), Mother Marie of the Incarnation in Dialogues des Carmélites, Pierrot lunaire, Judith in Bluebeard's Castle, Countess Geschwitz in Lulu, Madame de Croissy in Dialogues des Carmélites (her Teatro alla Scala debut, under Riccardo Muti, 2004; three years later she sang in Jenůfa there), Míla's Mother in Osud, the Comtesse in Pique-dame, and the Witch in Hänsel und Gretel. She was first heard in Cleveland, Boston, Madrid, Leipzig, Prague, and Rio de Janeiro in these recent seasons. Her 2001 recording of Jenůfa, from Covent Garden, won a Grammy Award.

Silja now resides in Paris, having purchased the former home of the conductor André Cluytens. In 2008, the soprano remarked that, following her performances in Dialogues des Carmélites, that opera “had the most influence on my life. Of course people like Wieland [Wagner] and my grandfather had influenced me a lot, but I can only say that this piece really changed my life. I found it so amazing in the way that it depicted the destiny of those nuns and how they lived their lives that because of it, and out of my tremendous admiration for Pope Benedict XVI, I became a Catholic. Until then I had never been baptised, but I don’t think that you can just suddenly become religious. I think that some sense of religion and faith was always within me but that something was needed to bring it out and that opera did it. I’m very thankful that it happened and it’s a great help and strength to me.” In January 2013, she sang the role of the Grandmother ("Babulenka") in The Gambler, in Frankfurt, in the production by Harry Kupfer, and in 2017 she performed Schoenberg's Pierrot lunaire and was the narrator in Gurre-Lieder in Hamburg, conducted by Kent Nagano.

== Awards ==
- 2005 Joana Maria Gorvin Prize
- 2026: Österreichischer Musiktheaterpreis for life's work

== Recordings ==
- Wagner
  - Der fliegende Holländer (Crass; Sawallisch, 1961) [live] Philips
  - Lohengrin (Varnay, Thomas, Vinay; Sawallisch, 1962) [live] Philips
  - Tannhäuser (Bumbry, Windgassen; Sawallisch, 1962) [live] Philips
  - Das Rheingold (Windgassen, Adam; Böhm, 1966) [live] Philips
  - Götterdämmerung (Nilsson, Windgassen; Böhm, 1967) [live] Philips
  - Der fliegende Holländer (Adam, Talvela; Klemperer, 1968) EMI
  - Die Walküre (Schnaut, Marc, Elming, Hale; Dohnányi, 1992) Decca Records
- Beethoven
  - Fidelio: excerpts (Stahlman, Sergi; Matačić, 1964) Eurodisc
- Puccini
  - Tosca: excerpts [in German] (King, Fischer-Dieskau; Maazel, 1966) Decca Records
- Berg
  - Lulu: Lulu-Suite (Dohnányi, 1973) Decca Records
  - Lulu (Fassbaender, Berry, Hotter; Dohnányi, 1976) Decca Records
  - Wozzeck (Wächter; Dohnányi, 1979) Decca Records
  - Wozzeck (Cassilly, van Dam; Levine, 1980) [live] Polygram Records
- Strauss
  - Salome: final scene (Dohnányi, 1973) Decca Records
  - Salome (Nielsen, Hale; Schønwandt, 1997) Chandos Records
- Schoenberg
  - Erwartung; Sechs Lieder (Dohnányi, 1979) Decca Records
  - Pierrot Lunaire (Craft, 1999) Koch Entertainment
  - Erwartung (Craft, 2000) Koch Entertainment
- Henze
  - La Cubana (Latham-König, 1982) WERGO
- Weill
  - Aufstieg und Fall der Stadt Mahagonny (Schlemm, Neumann; Latham-König, 1985) Capriccio
  - Die sieben Todsünden (Nowak, 2002) hänssler
- Janáček
  - Jenůfa (Mattila, Silvasti, Hadley; Haitink, 2001) [live] Erato Records
- Russian Songs (Andrej Hoteev, 2007) (Rachmaninoff: 10 songs; Mussorgsky: Songs and Dances of Death) Sony/RCA Red Seal

== Commercial videography ==
- Ludwig van Beethoven
  - Fidelio (Popp, Cassilly, Adam; L.Ludwig, Hess, 1968) Arthaus
- Engelbert Humperdinck
  - Hänsel und Gretel (Damrau, Kirchschlager, Allen; C.Davis, Leiser/Caurier, 2008) [live] Opus Arte
- Leoš Janáček
  - Jenůfa (R.Alexander; A.Davis, Lehnhoff, 1989) [live] Kultur
  - The Makropulos Affair (Tear; A.Davis, Lehnhoff, 1995) [live] Kultur
- Richard Strauss
  - Salome (Malfitano, Terfel; Dohnányi, Bondy, 1997) [live] Decca
- Francis Poulenc
  - Dialogues des Carmélites (Schellenberger, Aikin; Muti, Carsen, 2004) [live] TDK

== Bibliography ==
- Anja Silja, by Josef Heinzelmann, Rembrandt Verlag, 1965.
- Die Sehnsucht nach dem Unerreichbaren, by Anja Silja (with Hubert Ortkemper), Parthus Verlag Berlin, 1999. ISBN 3-932529-29-4
