= Peter-André Alt =

German literary scholar (born 1960)

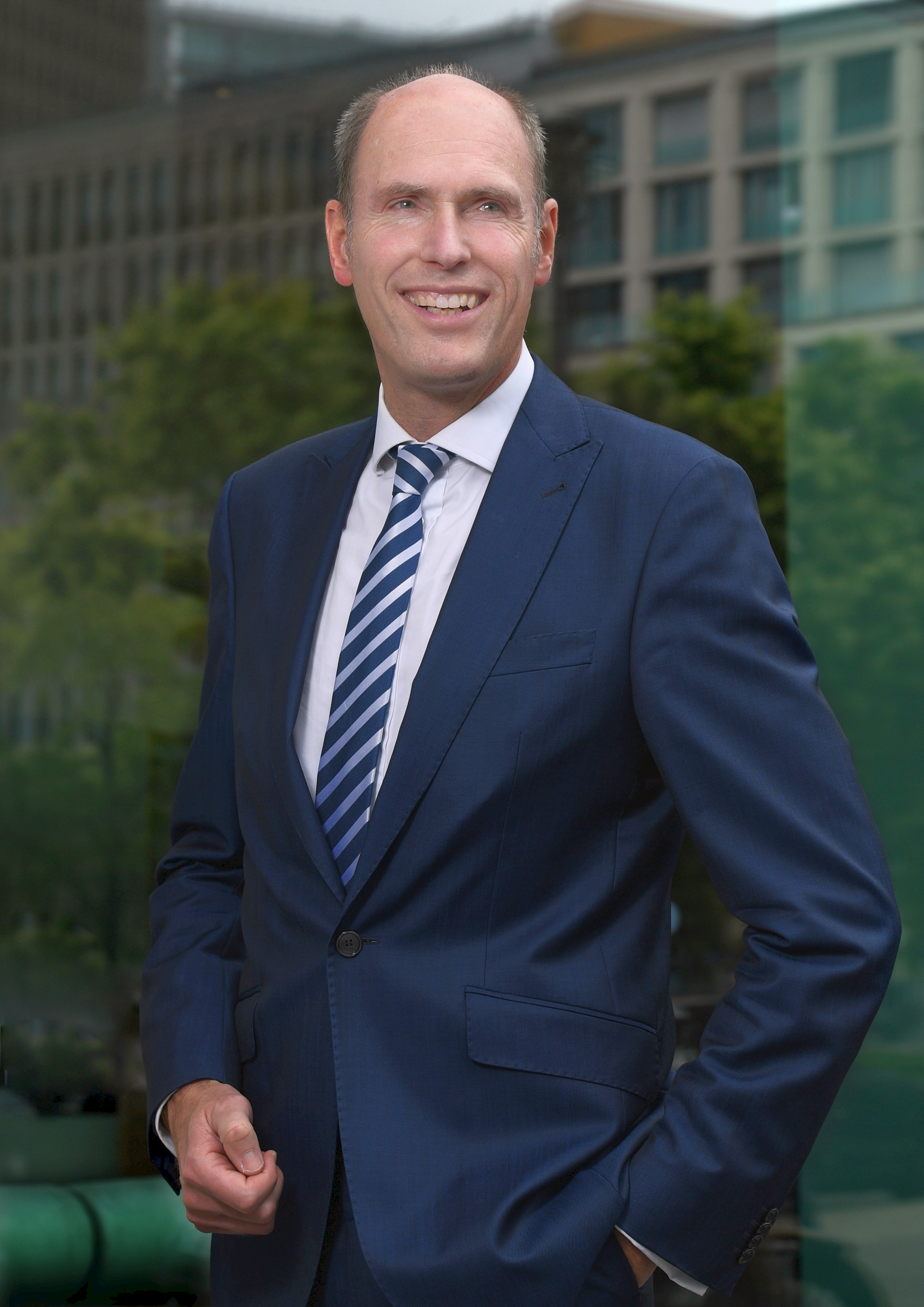
- Born: 16 May 1960 (age 66); Berlin, Germany
- Occupation: Literary scholar

Peter-André Alt (born 16 June 1960 in Berlin) is a German literary scholar, former president of the Freie Universitaet of Berlin and, since August 2018, president of the German Rectors' Conference (HRK). Alt is married to the writer Sabine Alt (Eva Ehley) and has two adult sons.

== Career ==
Among the first authors Alt read was Karl May: at the age of eight he read Winnetou I. Following his Abitur, Alt studied 1979 to 1984 German, political science, history and philosophy at the Freie Universitaet Berlin, where he received his doctorate in 1984 and accomplished his habilitation in 1993. From 1987 to 1992 he was a research assistant at the chair of Hans-Jürgen Schings at the Freie Universitaet, from 1992 to 1993 he held a habilitation fellowship from the German Research Foundation (DFG), and from 1994 to 1995 he was a Heisenberg Fellow of the DFG.

1995 he was appointed to a full professorship of Modern German Literature at the Ruhr University in Bochum; 2002 he moved to a chair at the University of Würzburg. Since 2005, he has been Professor of Modern German Literature at Freie Universitaet Berlin, succeeding his teacher Schings. Alt was director of the Dahlem Research School (Center for Graduate Studies) at the Freie Universitaet Berlin from 2008-2010, and also directed the Friedrich Schlegel Graduate School of Literary Studies from 2007-2010 (excellence funding from the German federal and state governments). He is and has been a member of numerous advisory boards (German Literature Archive Marbach, Ludwig Boltzmann Institute for the History and Theory of Biography) and a reviewer for the German Academic Exchange Service (DAAD). He has held guest lectureships in Trieste (Italy), among other places; research stays have taken him as a visiting scholar to the University of Cambridge, the USA (Princeton University), Italy (Rome, La Villa, Como) and the Czech Republic (Prague).

From 2008 to 2020, Alt was on the board of the German Schiller Society (supporting association of the German Literature Archive), and acted as its president from 2012 to 2020. 12 May 2010, Alt was elected President of Freie Universitaet Berlin. His term of office began on 3 June 2010. He was re-elected for a second term on 30 April 2014. Following is presidency at Freie Universitaet Alt was elected president of the German Rectors' Conference (HRK) in April 2018, succeeding Horst Hippler. Alt took office on 1 August 2018. On 27 April 2021, Alt was re-elected by the HRK General Assembly for a further three years as President from 1 August 2021.

== Work ==
Alt's publications since 1985 include 19 monographs, more than 100 essays, 25 reviews, several editions, six anthologies on German-language and European literature of the 17th to 18th and 20th centuries. Special historical foci are the early modern period, Weimar Classicism and the literature of classical modernism.

His research focuses on questions of the historicity and normativity of poetological and aesthetic systems of order, the history of tragedy, the relationship between knowledge and literature in the early modern period (dream, imagination, hermetism, paradox) and the reflection of political theology in texts of the 17th century. An important area of Alt's work is also literary biography, both in terms of its specific methodology and in relation to problems of literary authorship.

Since 2005, Alt has regularly published articles on issues of science and education policy in regional and national daily newspapers, including the Frankfurter Allgemeine, the Süddeutsche Zeitung and the Berliner Tagesspiegel. He wrote a weekly column for the Berliner Morgenpost between 2014 and 2017; November 2017 to March 2021 he was a columnist for the Berliner Zeitung.

== Recognition ==
In 2005, Alt received the Schiller Prize of the City of Marbach am Neckar for his two-volume biography of Schiller (2000). In 2008, he was awarded the Opus Magnum scholarship from the Volkswagen and Thyssen foundations as part of the "Pro Geisteswissenschaften" initiative for the completion of his book project Aesthetics of Evil.

== Other activities (selection) ==
Alt was / is member of

=== Corporate boards ===
- Berliner Sparkasse, deputy chairman of the advisory board

=== Non-profits ===
- Alexander von Humboldt Foundation, Member of the Board of Trustees
- Leibniz Association, member of the senate
- Max Delbrück Center for Molecular Medicine in the Helmholtz Association (MDC), member of the supervisory board
- Berlin Institute for Advanced Study, member of the assembly
- German Future Prize, Member of the Board of Trustees
- Berlin Social Science Center (WZB), member of the board of trustees
- Genshagener Kreis, member of the board of trustees
- German National Academic Foundation, Member of the Board of Trustees
- Weimar Classics Foundation, member of the scientific advisory board
- German Academic Exchange Service (DAAD), member of the board of trustees (2018–2019)
- German Institute for Economic Research (DIW), member of the board of trustees (2010–2018)

== Selected works ==
- Aufklärung. Lehrbuch Germanistik. 3. Auflage Metzler, Stuttgart 2007, ISBN 978-3-476-02236-3.
- Begriffsbilder. Studien zur literarischen Allegorie zwischen Opitz und Schiller. (Studien zur Deutschen Literatur; 131). Niemeyer, Tübingen 1995, ISBN 3-484-18131-1 (Zugleich Habilitation FU Berlin 1993).
- Franz Kafka. Der ewige Sohn. Eine Biographie. 2. Auflage, C.H.Beck, München 2008, ISBN 978-3-406-57535-8.
- Ironie und Krise. Ironisches Erzählen als Form ironischer Wahrnehmung in Thomas Manns „Der Zauberberg“ und Robert Musils „Der Mann ohne Eigenschaften“. 2. veränderte Auflage, Lang, Frankfurt am Main 1989, ISBN 3-631-41625-3.
- Kafka und der Film. Über kinematographisches Erzählen. C.H.Beck, München 2009, ISBN 978-3-406-58748-1.
- Klassische Endspiele. Das Theater Goethes und Schillers. C.H.Beck, München 2008, ISBN 978-3-406-56929-6.
- Schiller. Leben, Werk, Zeit. 3. Auflage, C.H.Beck, München 2009,
1. 1759–1791. ISBN 978-3-406-58681-1.
2. 1791–1805. ISBN 978-3-406-58682-8.
- Der Schlaf der Vernunft. Literatur und Traum in der Kulturgeschichte der Neuzeit. C.H.Beck, München 2002, ISBN 3-406-49337-8.
- Der Tod der Königin. Frauenopfer und politische Souveränität im Trauerspiel des 17. Jahrhunderts. De Gruyter, Berlin 2004, ISBN 3-11-018117-7 (Quellen und Forschungen zur Literatur- und Kulturgeschichte; Band 30).
- Tragödie der Aufklärung. Eine Einführung. Francke, Tübingen 1994, ISBN 3-8252-1781-7 (UTB; 1781).
- Die Verheißungen der Philologie. Wallstein, Göttingen 2007, ISBN 978-3-8353-0175-7 (Göttinger Sudelbuchblätter).
- Von der Schönheit zerbrechender Ordnungen. Körper, Politik und Geschlecht in der Literatur des 17. Jahrhunderts. Wallstein, Göttingen 2007, ISBN 978-3-8353-0194-8.
- Ästhetik des Bösen. C.H.Beck, München 2010, ISBN 978-3-406-60503-1.
- Imaginäres Geheimwissen. Untersuchungen zum Hermetismus in literarischen Texten der Frühen Neuzeit, V & R, unipress, Göttingen 2012, ISBN 978-3-89971-675-7.

== Literature ==
- Felicitas von Aretin: Warum Kafka nicht pfeifend die Treppe hochkommt. Peter-André Alt forscht über Franz Kafka. In: Der Tagesspiegel, 15. Oktober 2005.
- Soeren R. Fauth: Peter-André Alt. In: Standart, 23 (Juni 2009), S.60-61
- Wolfgang Schneider: Der Systematiker. Peter-André Alt. In: Börsenblatt für den Deutschen Buchhandel, 8. September 2005.
- Antoine Verbij: Meer moral in de politiek! Portrait Peter-André Alt. In: De Groene Amsterdamer, 25. September 2009
- Anja Kühne: Ich habe ein I-Phone. Peter-André Alt, FU-Präsidentschaftsaspirant'. In: Der Tagesspiegel, 22. Februar 2010
- Anja Kühne: Im Geist der Freien Universität. In: Der Tagesspiegel, 6. Mai 2010
- Birgit Haas, Uta Keseling: Berliner Spaziergang – Herr der Rostlaube, Förderer der Eliten. In: Berliner Morgenpost, 5. September 2010
- Heik Afheldt: HEIK AFHELDT trifft... Peter-André Alt, FU-Präsident. In: Der Tagesspiegel, 2. Februar 2011
