= Saša Stanišić =

Bosnian-German writer (born 1978)

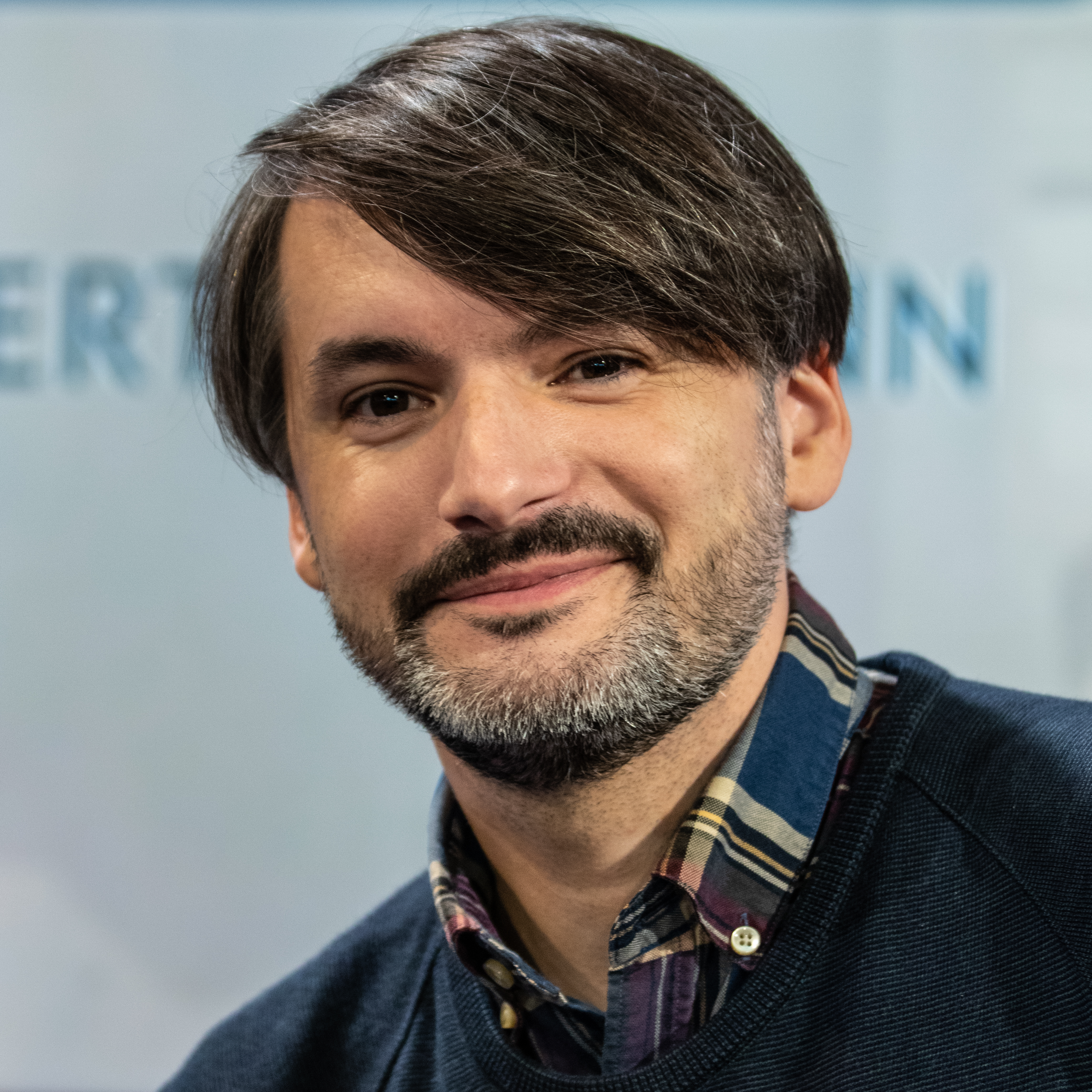
Stanišić in 2019

Saša Stanišić (Serbian Cyrillic: Саша Станишић; born 7 March 1978) is a Bosnian-German writer.

== Biography ==
He was born in Višegrad, Bosnia and Herzegovina as the son of a Bosniak mother and a Serb father. In the spring of 1992, he fled alongside his family to Germany as a refugee of the Bosnian War. Stanišić spent the remainder of his youth in Heidelberg, where his teachers encouraged his passion for writing. After graduating from high school, he enrolled in the University of Heidelberg, graduating with degrees in Slavic studies and German as a second language.

In 2006, Stanišić released his debut novel, published in English as How the Soldier Repairs the Gramophone. The book won multiple awards both in Germany and abroad and has been translated into 31 languages as of 2019. The English translation by Anthea Bell was awarded the Oxford-Weidenfeld Translation Prize. It was also adapted for the stage by the Stadtschauspielhaus Graz, where Stanišić was the city's writer-in-residence in 2006–2007.

In 2019 he won the German Book Prize for his novel Herkunft (English title: Where You Come From). In his acceptance speech Stanišić expressed his discontent with the decision of the Nobel Committee to award the 2019 Literature Nobel Prize to the Austrian author Peter Handke. Stanišić criticized Handke for his support of Slobodan Milošević, saying, "I had the fortune to escape that which Peter Handke does not describe in his texts."

== Bibliography ==
- Stanišić, Saša (2006). Wie der Soldat das Grammofon repariert : Roman (in German). München: Luchterhand. ISBN 978-3-630-87242-1. OCLC 71255704.
- —— (2014). Vor dem Fest : Roman (in German). München: Luchterhand. ISBN 978-3-630-87243-8. OCLC 876821679.
- —— (2016). Fallensteller Erzählungen (in German). München: Luchterhand Literaturverlag GmbH. ISBN 978-3-630-87471-5. OCLC 932020515.
- —— (2019). Herkunft (in German). München. ISBN 978-3-630-87473-9. OCLC 1096452108.
- —— (2023). Wolf (in German). München: Carlsen. ISBN 978-3-646-93787-9.
- —— (30 May 2024). Möchte die Witwe angesprochen werden, platziert sie auf dem Grab die Gießkanne mit dem Ausguss nach vorne (in German). München: Luchterhand. ISBN 978-3-630-87768-6.

=== English translations ===
- Stanišić, Saša; Bell, Anthea (2008). How the soldier repairs the gramophone. New York: Grove. ISBN 978-0-8021-4422-5. OCLC 460999927.
- ——; Bell, Anthea (2016). Before the feast. Portland, Oregon. ISBN 978-1-941040-39-3. OCLC 923794263.
- ——; Searls, Damion (2021). Where you come from. London. ISBN 978-1-78733-278-2. OCLC 1237353045.

== Awards and honors (selection) ==
- 2013 Alfred Döblin Prize
- 2014 Leipzig Book Fair Prize for Vor dem Fest (Before the feast)
- 2019 German Book Prize for Herkunft (Where you come from)
- 2021 Schiller Prize of the City of Marbach
- 2023 Nelly Sachs Prize
- 2023 Angelus Award
- 2024 Wilhelm Raabe Literature Prize
