= Joana Maria Gorvin Prize =

German theatre award

The Joana Maria Gorvin Prize, given every five years by the Academy of the Arts, Berlin on behalf of the Joana Maria Gorvin Foundation, is intended to honor the outstanding performance of a female theater artist in German-speaking countries. The award is named after the actress Joana Maria Gorvin, who died in 1993, who among other things belonged to the Berlin State Theater Ensemble of Gustaf Gründgens. The jury for the 10,000 euro prize is made up of five male members of the performing arts section at the will of the founder Maximilian B. Bauer, Joana Maria Gorvin's second husband.

== Recipients ==
- 1995 Pina Bausch
- 2000 Anny Schlemm
- 2005 Anja Silja
- 2010 Jutta Lampe
- 2015 Kirsten Dene
- 2020 Andrea Breth
