= Schiller Prize of the City of Marbach =

Award

The Schiller Prize of the City of Marbach, endowed with 10,000 euros, is awarded every two years on 10 November, Friedrich Schiller's birthday, to personalities who are committed to the poet's tradition of thought in their life or work. The prize was first awarded in 1959, on the 200th birthday of Schiller. Up until 2007 it was awarded every two years for outstanding work in the field of regional studies of Württemberg. In the Schiller Year 2009, the award criteria were changed. The award has been given to persons who are committed in their life or work to Schiller's tradition of thought.

== Recipients ==
- 1959: Walter Grube
- 1961: Werner Fleischhauer
- 1963: Ruthardt Oehme
- 1965: Georg Wagner and Adolf Koch
- 1967: Hansmartin Decker-Hauff
- 1969: Paul Gehring
- 1971: Hans Jänichen
- 1973: Adolf Beck
- 1975: Max Schefold
- 1977: Paul Sauer
- 1979: Robert Uhland
- 1981: Wolfgang Binder
- 1983: Rainer Christlein
- 1985: Dorothea Kuhn
- 1987: Paul Feuchte
- 1989: Gerhard Schäfer
- 1991: Volkmar Wirth
- 1993: Renate Neumüllers-Klauser
- 1995: Norbert Oellers
- 1997: Ulrike Gauss and Christian von Holst
- 1999: Lutz Reichardt
- 2001: Bernhard Zeller
- 2003: Horst Carl
- 2005: Peter-André Alt
- 2007: Dieter Mertens
- 2009: Jens Reich
- 2011: Simone Veil
- 2013: Rachel Salamander
- 2015: Andrea Breth
- 2017: Horst Bredekamp
- 2019: Christiane Nüsslein-Volhard
- 2021: Saša Stanišić
- 2023: Iris Berben
- 2025: Igor Levit
