= Neu-Isenburg =

- Town
- Flag Coat of arms

- Location of Neu-Isenburg within Offenbach district
- Interactive map of Neu-Isenburg
- Location within Germany Location within Hesse
- Coordinates: 50°03′N 8°42′E
- Country: Germany
- State: Hesse
- Admin. region: Darmstadt
- District: Offenbach
- Subdivisions: 3 Stadtteile

Government
  - Mayor (2021–27): Dirk Gene Hagelstein (SPD)

Area
  - Total: 24.29 km^{2} (9.38 sq mi)
- Elevation: 130 m (430 ft)

Population (2025-12-31)
  - Total: 38,236
  - Density: 1,574/km^{2} (4,077/sq mi)
- Time zone: UTC+01:00 (CET)
  - Summer (DST): UTC+02:00 (CEST)
- Postal codes: 63263
- Dialling codes: 06102,(Zeppelinheim:069)
- Vehicle registration: OF
- Website: www.neu-isenburg.de

Neu-Isenburg (German pronunciation: [nɔʏˈʔiːzn̩bʊʁk], lit. 'New Isenburg') is a town in Germany, located in the Offenbach district of Hesse. It is part of the Frankfurt Rhein-Main urban area and has a population of 38,204 (2020). The town is known nowadays mainly for its regionally used shopping centre, the Isenburg-Zentrum (IZ), the Hugenottenhalle, the Hotel Kempinski Frankfurt, the Autokino Gravenbruch (the oldest drive-in cinema in Europe), the Sportpark, the Waldschwimmbad (swimming pool) and its location near Frankfurt Airport.

== Geography ==
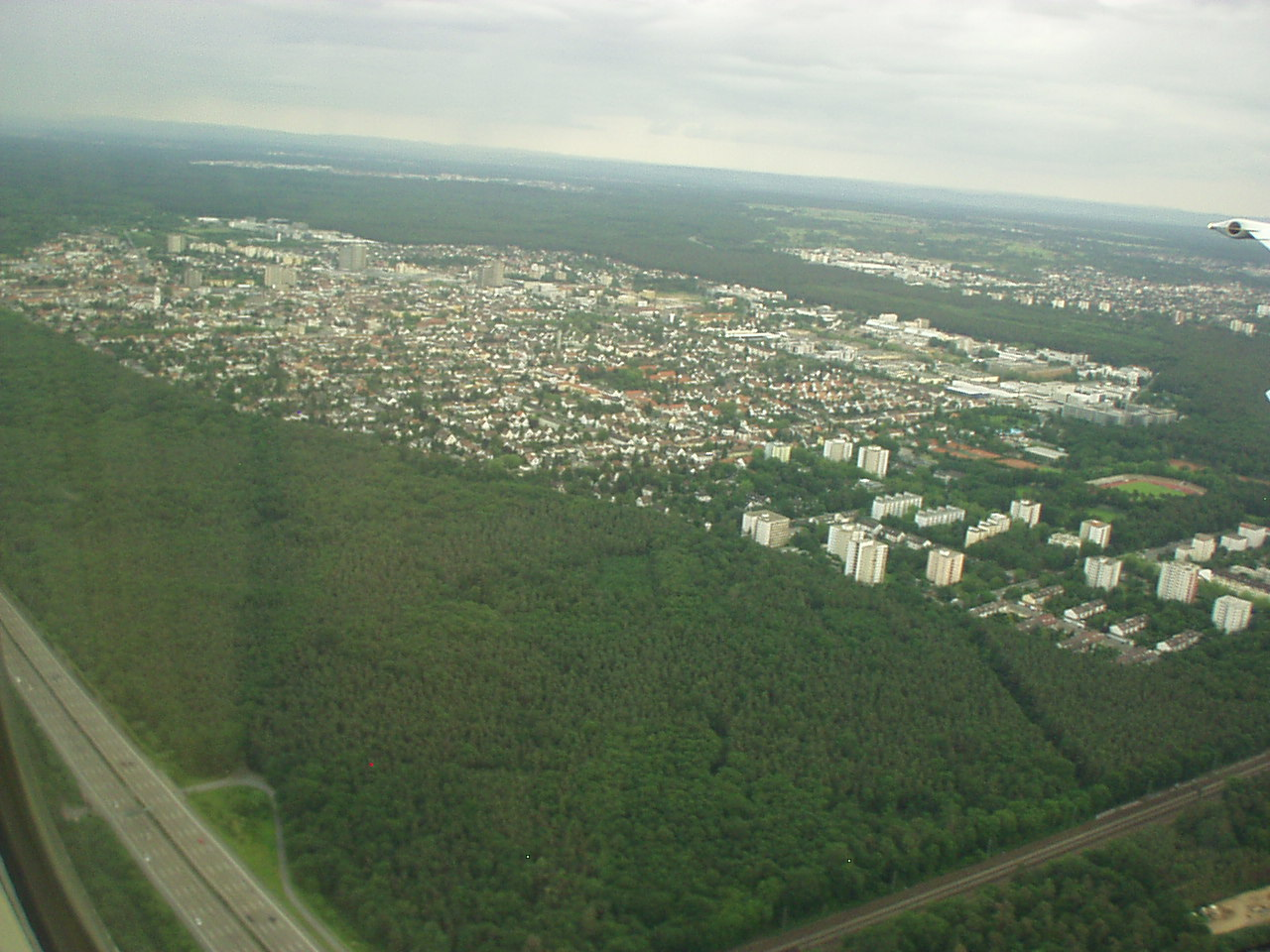
Neu-Isenburg, in the background at right Dreieich-Sprendlingen and above Dietzenbach

=== Neighbouring communities ===
Neu-Isenburg borders in the west and north on the district-free city of Frankfurt am Main, in the east on the district-free city of Offenbach and in the south on the towns of Dreieich, Langen and Mörfelden-Walldorf (Groß-Gerau district).

=== Constituent communities ===
In 1959, building work began on the Wohnstadt im Grünen ("Living Town in the Green"), as it was marketed. This was Gravenbruch. Almost 7,000 people found a new home in this satellite town between the main town and Heusenstamm, lying in the woods. Owing to the great number of young families that moved there, this constituent community was known as the town with Europe's densest population of children. It is also well known for the Kempinski-Hotel and the drive-in cinema.

With the amalgamation of the formerly self-administering community of Zeppelinheim in the course of municipal reform in 1977, Neu-Isenburg also stretched farther westwards. Here is found the Zeppelinmuseum.

== History ==
Neu-Isenburg was founded on 24 July 1699 as a town of exiles by Huguenots, French Protestants who had had to flee their homeland after the Edict of Nantes was revoked. Their new landlord, Count Johann Philipp von Isenburg-Offenbach, guaranteed them safety, the free use of the French language and religious freedom.

He gave them leave to settle in the Wildbann Dreieich, an old royal hunting forest, in the place where in the Middle Ages the pilgrimage chapel Zum Heiligen Kreuz ("To the Holy Cross") once stood. By way of thanks to the Count, the town was named Neu-Isenburg after him. The town plan was laid out by Andreas Loeber in a right-angled grid pattern. From corners ran diagonal streets to the marketplace. Also, the middles of the outer sides were linked by streets to the square marketplace. This township survives today in the streets of Kronengasse, Pfarrgasse, Löwengasse and Hirtengasse.

Neu-Isenburg was one of the planned towns of the 17th and 18th centuries. The settlers at first worked at farming, but later turned back to the handicraft trades that they had learnt, such as the stocking knitter's craft, thereby laying the groundwork for Neu-Isenburg's economic development. The surrounding communities eyed the French settlers with great mistrust and called the town welsches Dorf (the German word welsch refers to peoples who speak Romance languages, especially French; it is cognate with the English word Welsh, but does not have the same meaning). On 20 May 1700 – a Thursday – the clergyman Isaac Bermond held the first church services under an old oak in the middle of the church square.

About 1701, the Forsthaus was built (today an inn called Frankfurter Haus) by the city of Frankfurt am Main at the city limits with Neu-Isenburg. The first French Reformed church was built of wood between 1702 and 1706. The foundation stone was laid on Ascension Day 1702. Likewise in 1702, the Town Hall was built at the marketplace, and the Haus zum Löwen was mentioned for the first time. This was used until 1918 as an inn called Au Lion d'Or ("At the Golden Lion"), and today it houses the local history museum.

The first school followed in 1704, and in 1705 the Bansamühle (mill). The wooden church was replaced between 1773 and 1775 with a stone building. In 1781, the first German-language school was built.

After the Congress of Vienna in 1815, the County of Ysenburg (Sovereign Principality of Isenburg after 1806), together with the Oberamt of Offenbach and its member municipalities, passed to the Grand Duchy of Hesse. In 1828, the Prussian-Hessian Customs Union built a customs house (Frankfurter Straße 10) as its main customs office on the border with what was then the Free City of Frankfurt.

Despite considerable reservations, German families, too, were moving into the town beginning in the 18th century, leading to the church's having to hold services alternately in German and French as of 1761, much to the French-speaking population's chagrin. In the end, German was confirmed as the town's official language in 1829.

In 1846, the Main-Neckar railway near Neu-Isenburg was completed, but the town did not get its own railway station until 1852. Other events in Neu-Isenburg's history, in brief, are as follows:

- 1860 The firm Müller markets Frankfurter Würstchen (sausages, but not the kind often called "Frankfurters" in the English-speaking world) for the first time.
- 1865 First postal station in Neu-Isenburg
- 1875 Volunteer fire brigade was founded
- 4 February 1889 Town rights were granted.
- 1889 The Waldbahn, a steam tramway, began running to Frankfurt.
- April 1896 The Höhere Bürgerschule (now Goetheschule) took on its task as Neu-Isenburg's first secondary school.
- 1899 On the occasion of its bicentenary, Neu-Isenburg received a coat of arms.
- 1907 The Jewish Women's Federation's home for Jewish girls was founded by Bertha Pappenheim.
- 23 October 1911 Consecration of the first Catholic church, St. Josef.
- 1929 The Waldbahn was electrified and incorporated into the Frankfurt tram network
- Between 1943 and 1945 the town suffered heavy damage from air raids.
- 1945 A broad area in the town's west had to be evacuated for the Occupying Power
- 1959 Building work began on Gravenbruch, a residential neighbourhood, after the woods there had been cleared.
- 1960 The Autokino Gravenbruch, Europe's first drive-in cinema, was opened.
- 1 January 1977 Amalgamation of the formerly self-administering community of Zeppelinheim, which itself had been cobbled together from parts of the self-administering municipal areas of Mitteldick and Gundwald (the latter in Groß-Gerau district) and parts of the community of Kelsterbach on 1 January 1938.
- 1997 Neu-Isenburg was linked to the Rhine-Main S-Bahn.
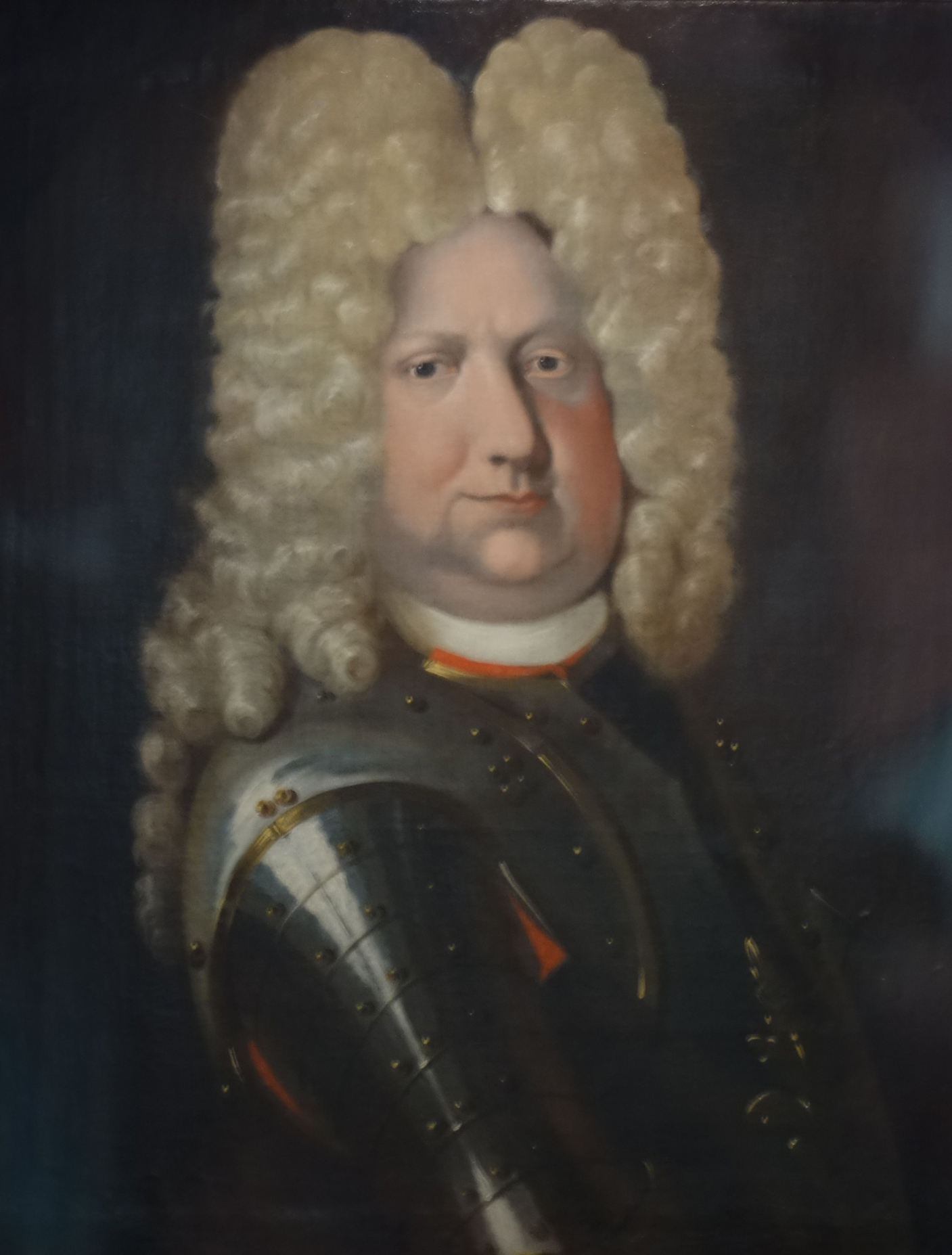
Count Johann Philipp von Isenburg-Offenbach, the town's founder

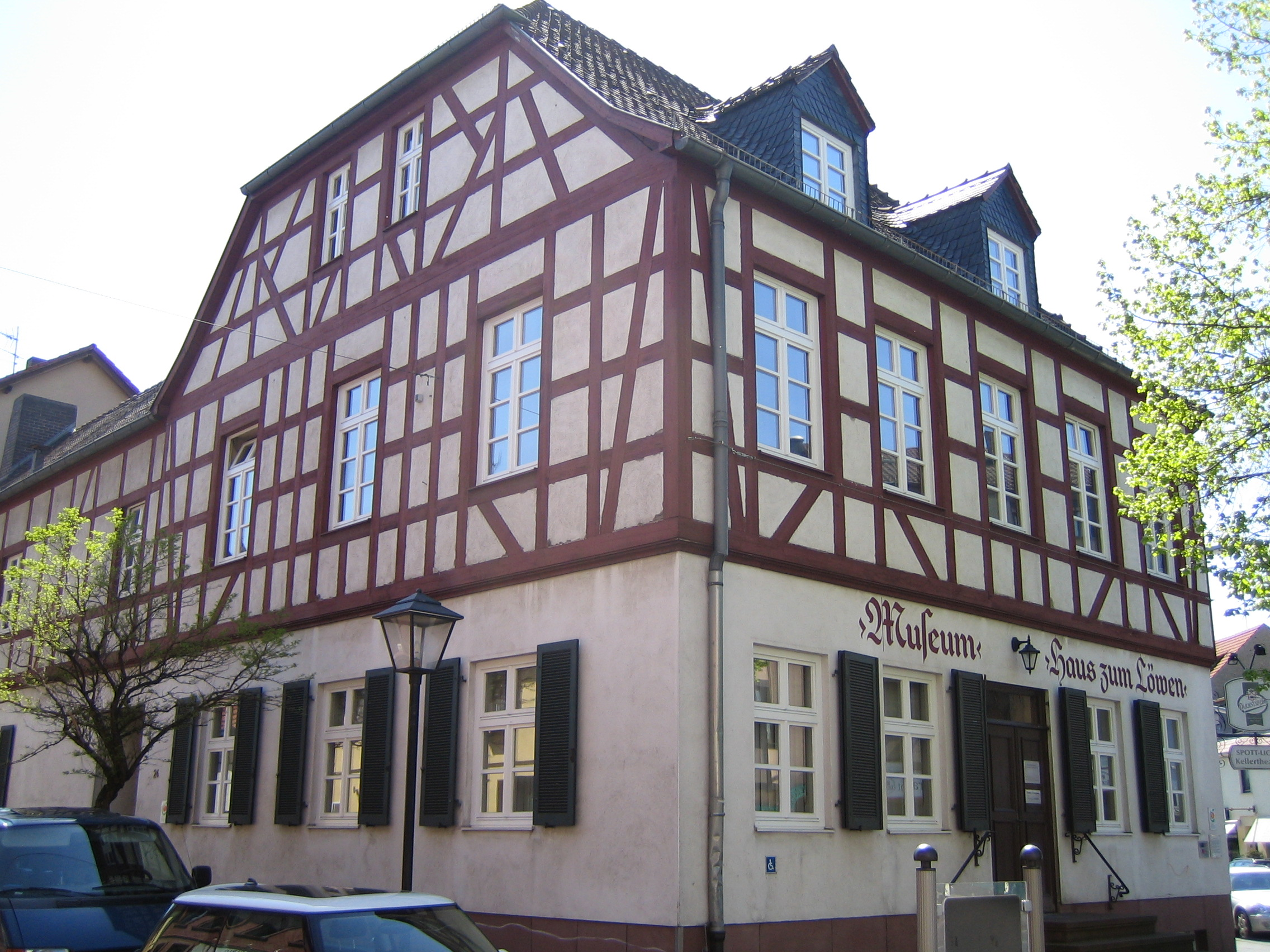
Haus zum Löwen

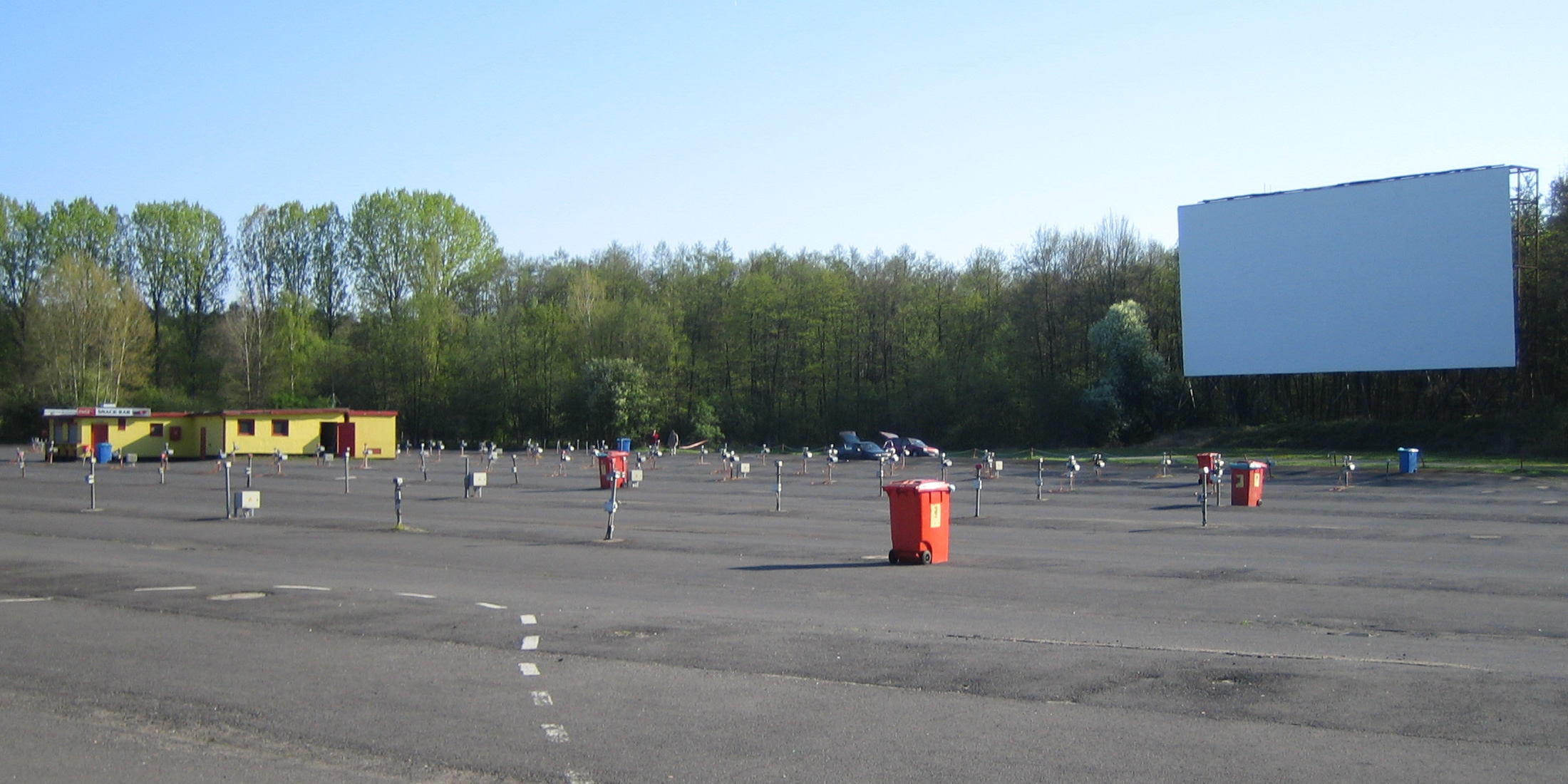
The Autokino Gravenbruch, opened in 1960, was Europe's first drive-in cinema.

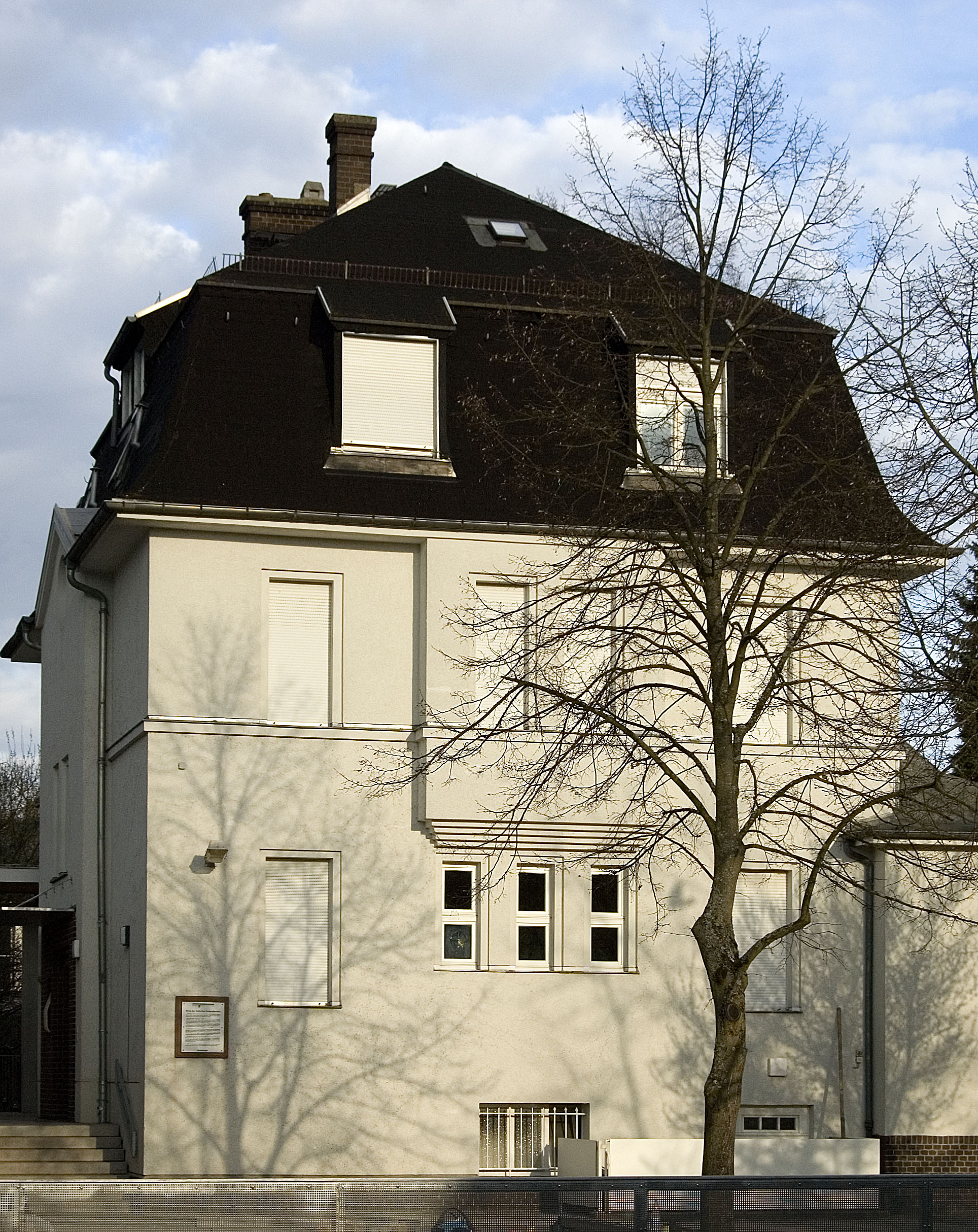
House on Zeppelinstraße, Neu-Isenburg, where Bertha Pappenheim housed her home for displaced Jewish girls

=== Population development ===
In 1834, Neu-Isenburg had only 1,762 inhabitants. By 1939, there were 15,081. After Zeppelinheim was amalgamated and Gravenbruch had been built, the population reached 35,000 by 1983.

== Politics ==
=== Town council ===
The municipal elections held on 6 March 2016 yielded the following results, compared to earlier municipal elections:

Parties and voter communities		CDU	SPD	AfD	GRÜNE	FDP	LINKE	FWG	Distribution of seats
2016	Share of the votes	36.8	23.5	12.5	11.9	7.2	4.8	3.2	
	Seats (out of 45)	17	11	6	5	3	2	1	
2011	Share of the votes	44.1	24.5	—	20.2	3.6	3.5	4.2	
	Seats (out of 45)	20	11	—	9	2	1	2	
2006	Share of the votes	52.0	23.3	—	14.0	5.4	—	5.2	
	Seats (out of 45)	23	11	—	6	3	—	2	
2001	Share of the votes	48.0	26.5	—	16.9	5.2	—	3.4	
	Seats (out of 45)	22	12	—	8	2	—	1	
1997	Share of the votes	41.8	29.9	—	16.1	5.7	—	6.5	
	Seats (out of 45)	19	13	—	7	3	—	3	

The CDU formed a coalition with Die Grünen (“The Greens”), the FDP and the Freie Wähler (“Free Voters”).

=== Mayors ===
Past mayoral elections have yielded the following results:

Year	Candidates	Party	% Result
2015	Herbert Hunkel	(Note: Herbert Hunkel was supported by the CDU)	77.4
2015	Thilo Seipel	FDP	22.6
Voter turnout it %		30.3	
2010	Herbert Hunkel		58.9
2010	Christian Beck	SPD	36.9
2010	Susann Guber	FDP	4.2
Voter turnout in %		38.4	
2007	Dirk-Oliver Quilling	CDU	83.3
2007	Markus Munari	SPD	16.7
Voter turnout in %		40.0	

Year	Candidates	Party	% Result
2001	Dirk-Oliver Quilling	CDU	78.5
2001	Wolfgang Lamprecht	SPD	19.0
2001	Edgar Schultheis		2.4
Voter turnout in %		41.1	
1995 (Note: Runoff)	Dirk-Oliver Quilling	CDU	63.1
1995	Berthold Depper	FDP	36.9
Voter turnout in %		38.0	
1995	Dirk-Oliver Quilling	CDU	49.5
1995	Günter Trützschler	SPD	14.1
1995	Maria Marx	Grüne	17.7
1995	Berthold Depper	FDP	18.8
Voter turnout in %		45.7	

At the last election on 27 September 2015, the independent candidate Herbert Hunkel, who was supported by the CDU, was reelected with 77.4% of the vote over Thilo Seipel (FDP, 22.6%). Voter turnout was 30.3%.

== Twin towns – sister cities ==
Neu-Isenburg is twinned with:

- Andrézieux-Bouthéon, France
- Bad Vöslau, Austria
- Chiusi, Italy
- Dacorum, England, United Kingdom
- Veauche, France
- Weida, Germany

=== Friendly cities ===
Neu-Isenburg also has friendly relations with:

- Alexandria, Minnesota, United States
- Sighisoara, Romania

== Economy and infrastructure ==
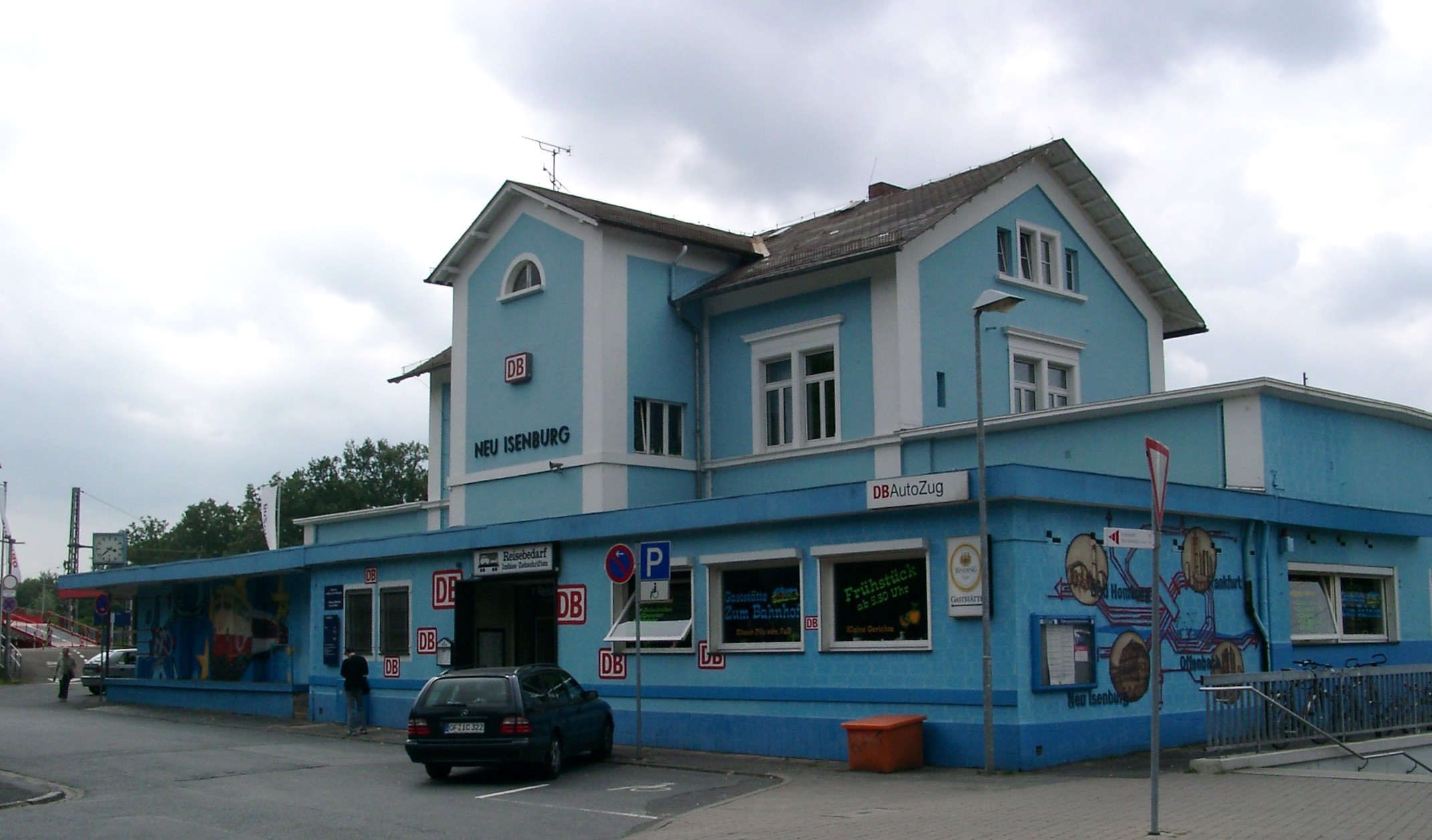
Railway station

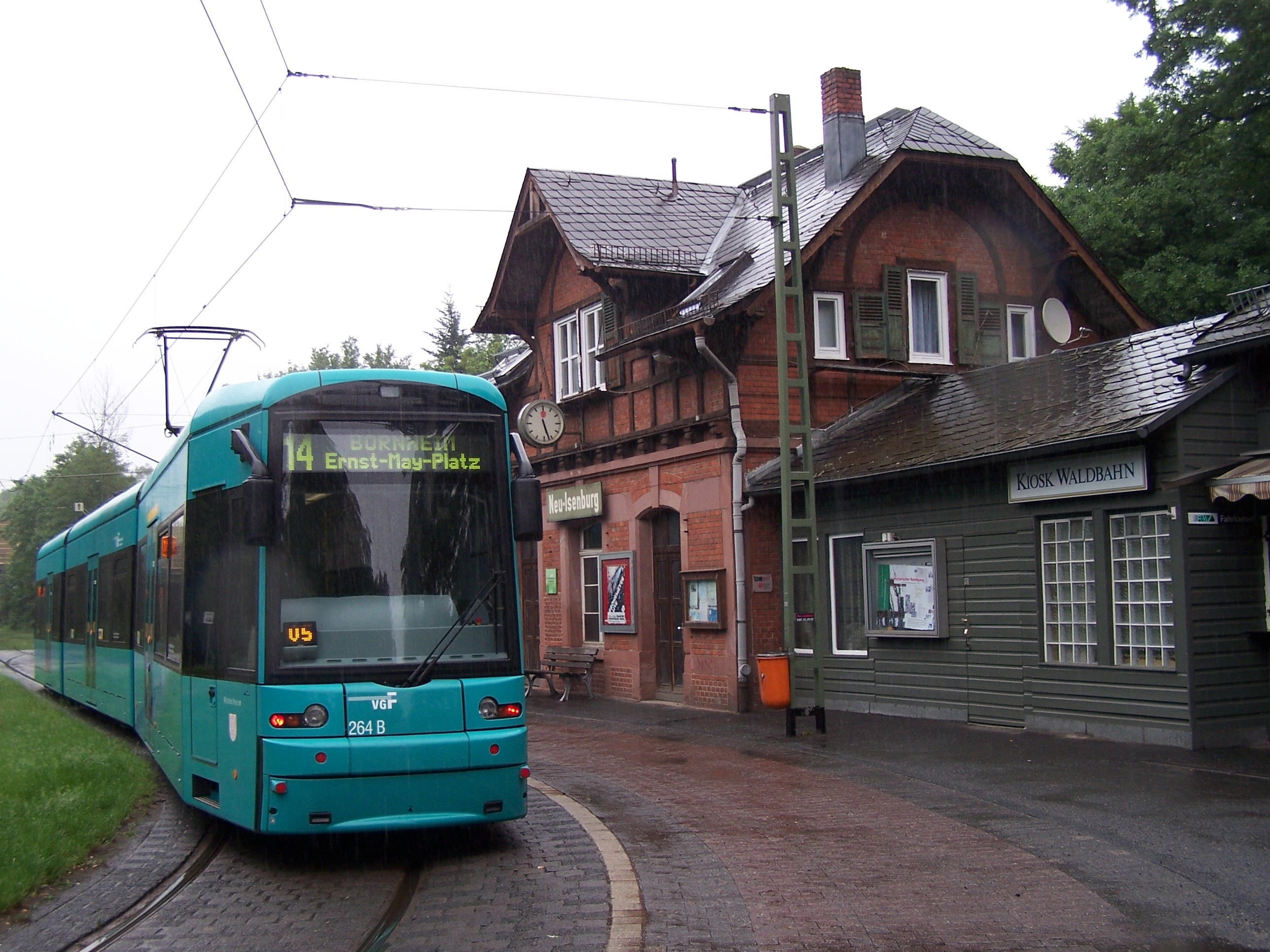
Tram at the Neu-Isenburg town limits stop

=== Economy ===
Given its proximity to the trade fair city of Frankfurt and to Frankfurt Airport, Neu-Isenburg is a common location for businesses in various sectors. One of the major businesses that are found here are hotels, which see more than 230,000 overnight stays every year, the highest figure in the Offenbach district.

Over time, the town has converted itself from a location for producing businesses to a service-industry-based location and is among the biggest high-technology locations in the Frankfurt Rhine Main Region.

Some of the businesses established here are:

- Aramark Holdings GmbH & Co. KG
- eprimo GmbH
- Harley-Davidson GmbH (Managing Germany, Austria and Switzerland)
- Jeppesen GmbH
- Kempinski Frankfurt AG
- Lorenz Snack-World GmbH (Bahlsen)
- Lufthansa Service GmbH (LSG Sky Chefs)
- AirPlus International
- Pepsi-Cola GmbH
- Symantec Corporation
- Keyence Deutschland GmbH
- UL International Germany GmbH
- Sescoi GmbH
- Alpha Industries GmbH & Co. KG
- Banque PSA Finance, SA.
- KarstadtQuelle Bank
- G. A. Müller GmbH (meat products factory, oldest manufacturer of the original Frankfurter Würstchen)
- Hans Wirth GmbH & Co. KG (meat products factory, manufacturer of the original Frankfurter Würstchen)

Around the 1980s and 1990s the airline Condor was headquartered in Neu-Isenburg.

=== Transport ===
The town is close to several routes of the German Autobahn network (A 3, A 5, A 661).

Neu-Isenburg station is on the Main-Neckar Railway and is served by Rhine-Main S-Bahn line and regional train RB 61, although the station is somewhat remote from the town centre. It is the only station in Hesse that has loading tracks for a motorail service, connecting to several destinations in Austria, Italy and southern France. This service was discontinued in 2014. However the terminal remains. runs over the Mannheim–Frankfurt railway, stopping at Zeppelinheim station.

The Frankfurt tram line 17 of VGF has its southern terminus at Isenburger Schneise, just within the Frankfurt boundary for reasons of municipal identity, linking the northern margin of Neu-Isenburg with Sachsenhausen, Frankfurt Central Station, Fair and Rebstockbad.

Neu Isenburg is located in the area of the transport association Rhein-Main-Verkehrsverbund (RMV).

Frankfurt Airport lies at the town limits.

== Culture and sightseeing ==
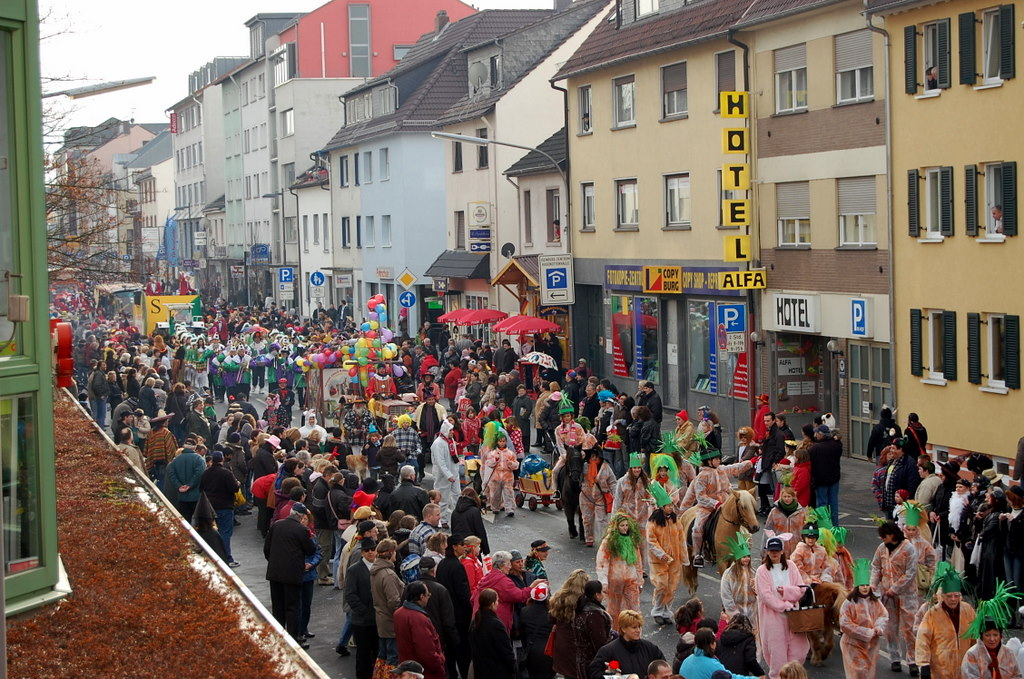
Rosenmontagsumzug in Neu-Isenburg

=== Hugenottenhalle ===
Neu-Isenburg is known far beyond its limits for the various events staged at the Hugenottenhalle. In this multipurpose hall with a variable capacity of up to 2,000 people, rock concerts are held, guest theatrical performances are given and dancing and music are performed. Citizens are offered a comprehensive cultural programme covering every genre.

=== Open-Doors-Festival ===
Neu-Isenburg is especially well known in the Frankfurt Rhine Main Region for its yearly summertime Open-Doors-Festival (formerly Musikspektakel). For three days, some 40 different bands and artists from all genres of music play. The free event is attended by some 15,000 guests and is held on several different stages throughout the town area.

=== Fastnacht ===
The parade through town on Shrove Monday (Rosenmontag) — sometimes called Lumpenmontag in Neu-Isenburg — enjoys great popularity.

=== Education ===
- Primary schools
  - Albert-Schweitzer-Schule
  - Hans-Christian-Andersen-Schule
  - Wilhelm-Hauff-Schule
  - Ludwig-Uhland-Schule, Gravenbruch
  - Selma-Lagerlöf-Schule, Zeppelinheim
- Gymnasium
  - Goetheschule
  - Abendgymnasium (formerly Schule im Buchenbusch)
- Comprehensive school
  - Brüder-Grimm-Schule
- Special school
  - Friedrich-Fröbel-Schule, school for learning help and speech therapy
- Other schools
  - Music school
  - Folk high school

== Media ==
Ärzte-Zeitung, a newspaper for physicians, has its headquarters in Neu-Isenburg.

== Notable people ==
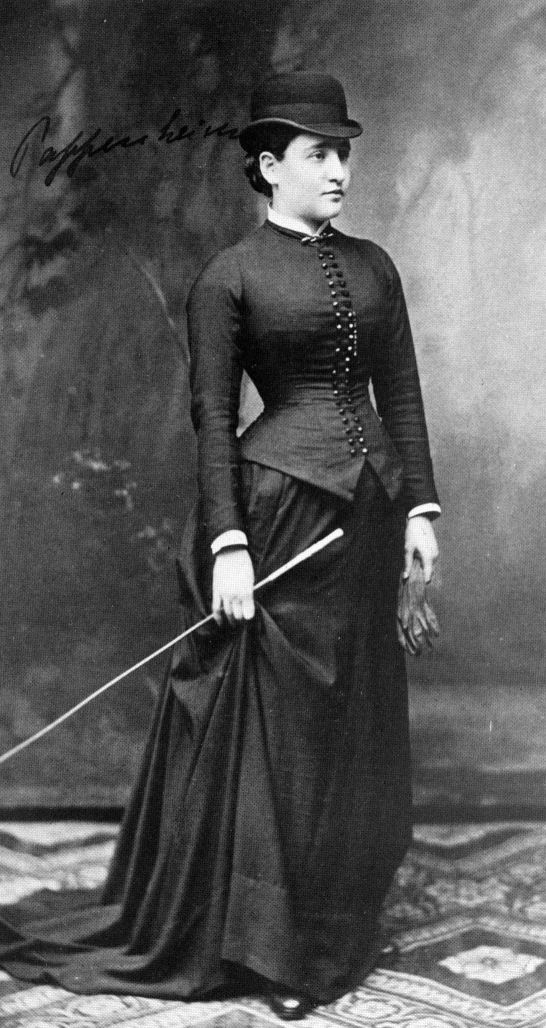
Bertha Pappenheim 1882

- Bertha Pappenheim (1859–1936), feminist and social worker
- Franz Völker (1899–1965), operatic singer
- Wilhelm Leichum (1911–1941), athlete
- Anny Schlemm (1929–1926), operatic singer
- Peter Dietrich (born 1944), footballer
- Horst Ludwig Störmer (born 1949), physicist, Nobel laureate
- Volker Steinbacher (born 1957), artist and graphic artist
- Torsten de Winkel (born 1965), guitarist

=== Honorary citizens ===
- Rudi Seiferlein (1921–2010), honorary chairman of the community of interests (IG) associations, posthumous award of honorary citizenship in March 2011
