= Franz Völker =

German opera singer

External audio
- Shellac recordings with Franz Völker in the Online Archive of the Österreichische Mediathek

Franz Völker (31 March 1899, Neu-Isenburg, Grand Duchy of Hesse – 4 December 1965, Darmstadt, Hesse) was a dramatic tenor who enjoyed a major European career. He excelled specifically as a performer of the operas of Richard Wagner.

He was discovered by the conductor Clemens Krauss and he studied singing at Frankfurt, where he made his début as Florestan in Beethoven's only operatic work, Fidelio, in 1926. Engagements followed in Vienna, Munich, Berlin, and London, where he appeared at the Royal Opera House, Covent Garden, in 1934 and 1937. He also performed often at the Salzburg Festival and the Bayreuth Festival, earning considerable public and critical acclaim.

Roles that he sang during this period, in addition to Florestan, included Parsifal, Lohengrin, Siegmund in Wagner's Die Walküre and Max in Weber's Der Freischütz. Later in his career, he sang the lead role in Verdi's Otello. He taught singing in Stuttgart, Germany, after retiring from the stage during the 1950s.

He appears in the title role of a fine complete live recording of Lohengrin, conducted by Robert Heger, made in Berlin in 1942. .

He also made recordings of popular songs, some of which can be found on YouTube, including "Heute Nacht Oder Nie".
