= Ärzte-Zeitung =

Ärzte-Zeitung (company name: Ärzte Zeitung Verlags-GmbH: ISSN 0175-5811, ZDB (DE) 604874–2) is a German newspaper for physicians and other medical professionals. The paper was first published on 1 October 1982. It is published by Springer Medizin. The publication's head office is in Neu-Isenburg.
