= Academy of Arts, Berlin =

National German academic institution for the advancement of the arts

- Akademie der Künste
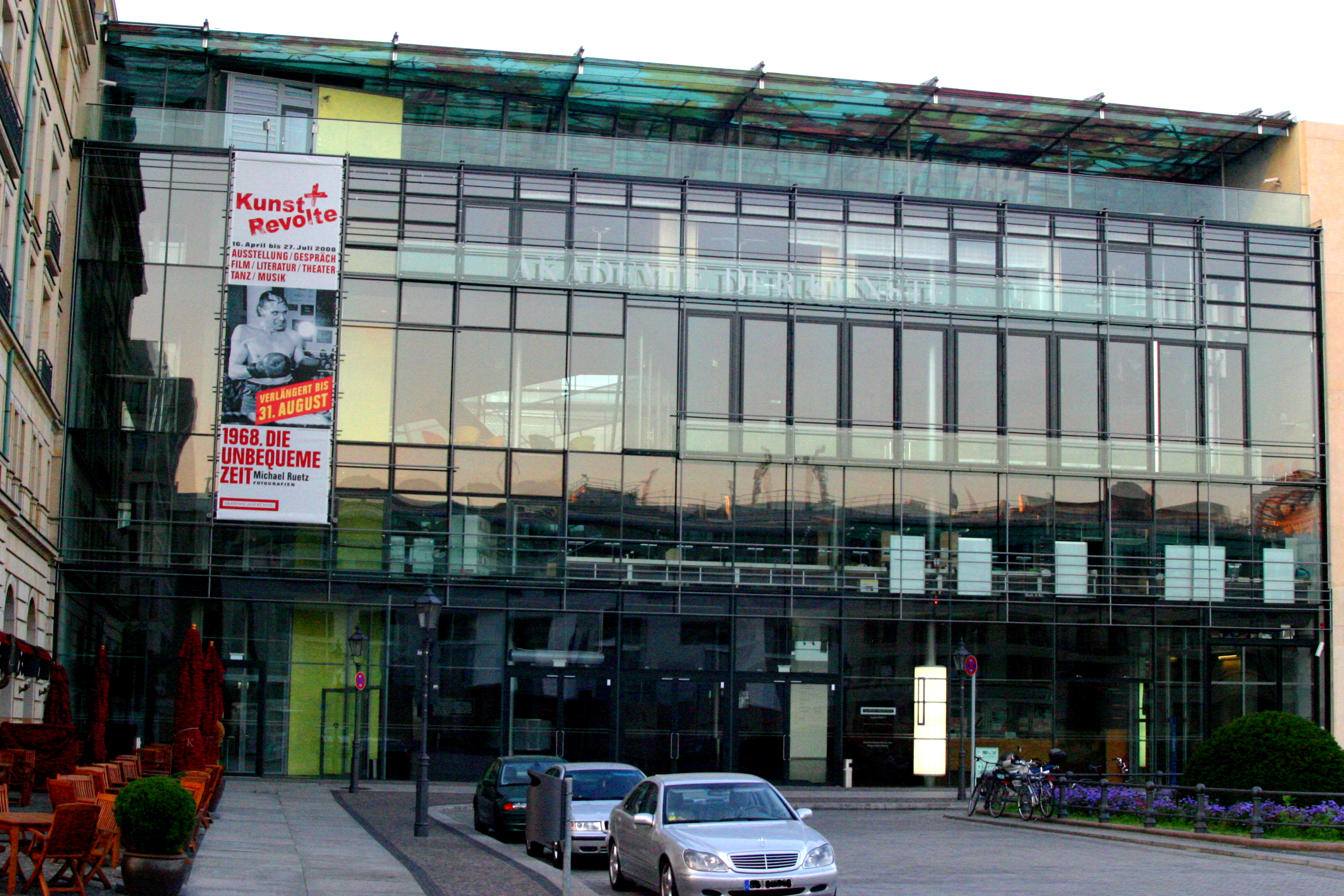
- Academy of Arts, Berlin in July 2008
- Predecessor: Prussian Academy of Arts
- Formation: October 1, 1993; 33 years ago
- Founder: Frederick III, Elector of Brandenburg
- Purpose: Advancement of the arts; advising and supporting the German states
- Headquarters: Pariser Platz, Berlin
- Coordinates: 52.5155°N 13.3796°E
- President: Manos Tsangaris
- Website: Official website
- Formerly called: Brandenburg Academy of Arts

The Academy of Arts (German: Akademie der Künste) is a state arts institution in Berlin, Germany. The task of the Academy is to promote art, as well as to advise and support the states of Germany.

The academy's predecessor organization was founded in 1696 by Elector Frederick III of Brandenburg as the Brandenburg Academy of Arts, an academic institution in which members could meet and discuss and share ideas. The current Academy was founded on 1 October 1993 as the re-unification of formerly separate East and West Berlin academies.

== Membership ==
The academy is an incorporated body of the public right under the laws of the Federal Republic of Germany. New members are nominated by secret ballot of the general assembly, and appointed by the president with membership never to exceed 500.

The academy's recent presidents include:

- Adolf Muschg – (2003–2006)
- Klaus Staeck – (2006–2015)
- Jeanine Meerapfel – (2015–2024)
- Manos Tsangaris – (2024–)

== History ==
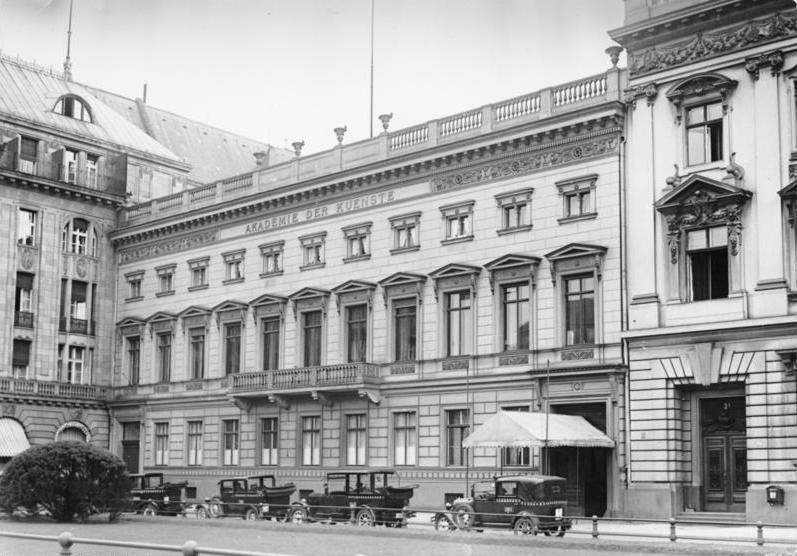
Palais Armin, home of the Academy of Arts from 1907 to 1938

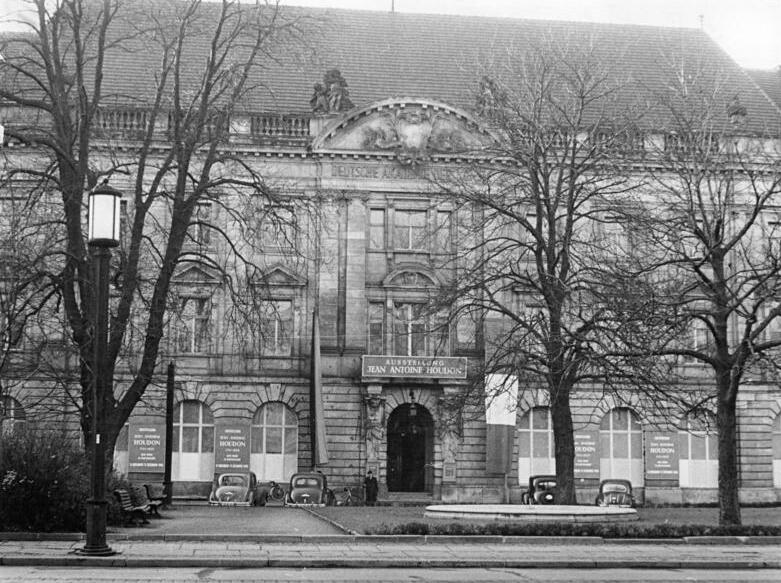
Akademie der Künste (East) at Robert-Koch-Platz, c. 1955

Beginning in the 1690s, the Prussian Academy of Arts, under various names, served as an arts council and learned society for the Prussian government. Founded by the Hohenzollern elector Frederick III (King in Prussia from 1701), it was the third-oldest such academy in Europe. The institution was housed on No. 8 Unter den Linden, until from 1902 the site was cleared and rebuilt as seat of the Berlin State Library. The academy then moved to Pariser Platz next to Hotel Adlon, where the Palais Arnim, former residence of Prime Minister Adolf Heinrich von Arnim-Boitzenburg, was refurbished according to plans designed by Ernst von Ihne.

The academy also served as a training school since its founding, and created a number of affiliated schools. The first was the Bauakademie for architectural training, founded in 1799. The academic arm was fully separated in 1931 and developed into the present-day Berlin University of the Arts (Universität der Künste Berlin). In 1938 the academy building was seized by Hitler's chief architect Albert Speer to evolve his Welthauptstadt Germania plans; temporarily relocated to the Kronprinzenpalais, the Prussian Academy ultimately ceased operations in 1945.

In postwar divided Germany, two parallel organizations took its place. The western successor organization was called the Akademie der Künste, founded in 1954 under President Hans Scharoun, which resided in the rebuilt Hansaviertel quarter of West Berlin. The eastern successor organization was founded on 24 March 1950 as the Deutsche Akademie der Künste in East Berlin, which became the Akademie der Künste der DDR in 1972, then the Akademie der Künste zu Berlin in 1990. Its presidents included Arnold Zweig, Ludwig Renn, Johannes R. Becher, Otto Nagel, Willi Bredel, Konrad Wolf, Manfred Wekwerth, and Heiner Müller.

The two were merged on 1 October 1993 into the present-day academy, which took its seat in a new building at the former location on Pariser Platz.

== Estates ==
The Otto Dix Foundation, created by artist Otto Dix's widow Martha, entrusted his estate to the academy. It includes 4,000 index cards of his works, around 300 letters to the artist, catalogues and publications that include mention of exhibitions of his work and even his paintbox containing all his equipment. It opened to the public at the academy in 2024.

== Awards and honours ==
- Berliner Kunstpreis
- Käthe Kollwitz Prize
- Heinrich Mann Prize
- Konrad Wolf Prize
- Hörspielpreis der Akademie der Künste
- Alfred Döblin Prize
- Joana Maria Gorvin Prize
- Will Lammert Prize
- Human Machine Fellowship
