= Universal Air Travel Plan =

Payment Network

Universal Air Travel Plan, Inc. (UATP) is a network that is dedicated to payments for travel related expenses such as carrier or hotel costs. It was established in 1936 as Air Travel Card. Its headquarters are in Washington, D.C. and it has regional offices in Los Angeles, New Delhi, Miami, São Paulo, Geneva, Beijing, Singapore and Tokyo.

== Products ==
Products offered:

- UATP Corporate Card
- Travel Protection Plans
- UATP Settlement Services
- UATP University
- ATCAN
- ATCAN-ICH
