= Ruth Hesse =

German opera singer (1936–2024)

- Ruth Hesse as Brangäne in Tristan und Isolde, in 1967
- Born: 18 September 1936; Wuppertal, Gau Düsseldorf, Germany
- Died: 13 July 2024 (aged 87); Hallstatt, Upper Austria, Austria
- Occupation: Operatic mezzo-soprano
- Organizations: Deutsche Oper Berlin; Vienna State Opera
- Awards: Kammersängerin

Ruth Hesse (18 September 1936 – 13 July 2024) was a German opera singer. A dramatic mezzo-soprano, she was a member of the Deutsche Oper Berlin from 1962 to 1995, where she took part in the world premiere of Henze's Der junge Lord. She was first invited to the Bayreuth Festival in 1960, where she performed until 1979.

Her international career began after she appeared at the Vienna State Opera in 1965 in two leading roles, Ortrud in Wagner Lohengrin and Eboli in Verdi's Don Carlos. She performed there regularly to 1988, and was appointed an Austrian Kammersängerin in 1982. Hesse first appeared as Brangäne in Wagner's Tristan und Isolde at the Opéra National de Lyon. Her first role at the Royal Opera House, in 1969, was the Nurse in Die Frau ohne Schatten by Richard Strauss, which became a signature role, repeated in Paris and at the 1974 Salzburg Festival, among others. Her voice was described as of a wide range, dark timbre and capable of dramatic expression.

== Life and career ==
Born in Wuppertal on 18 September 1936, Hesse first studied with Peter Offermanns in Wuppertal, then with Hildegard Scharf in Hamburg and finally also in Milan. She made her debut in 1958 at the Theater Lübeck as Orpheus in Gluck's Orfeo ed Euridice, and remained there until 1960. Afterwards she was engaged for two seasons at the Staatsoper Hannover. In 1960 she made her debut at the Hamburg State Opera and the Bayreuth Festival, where she performed until 1979 and was gradually assigned larger roles, culminating in Ortrud in Lohengrin, opposite Peter Hofmann and Karan Armstrong.

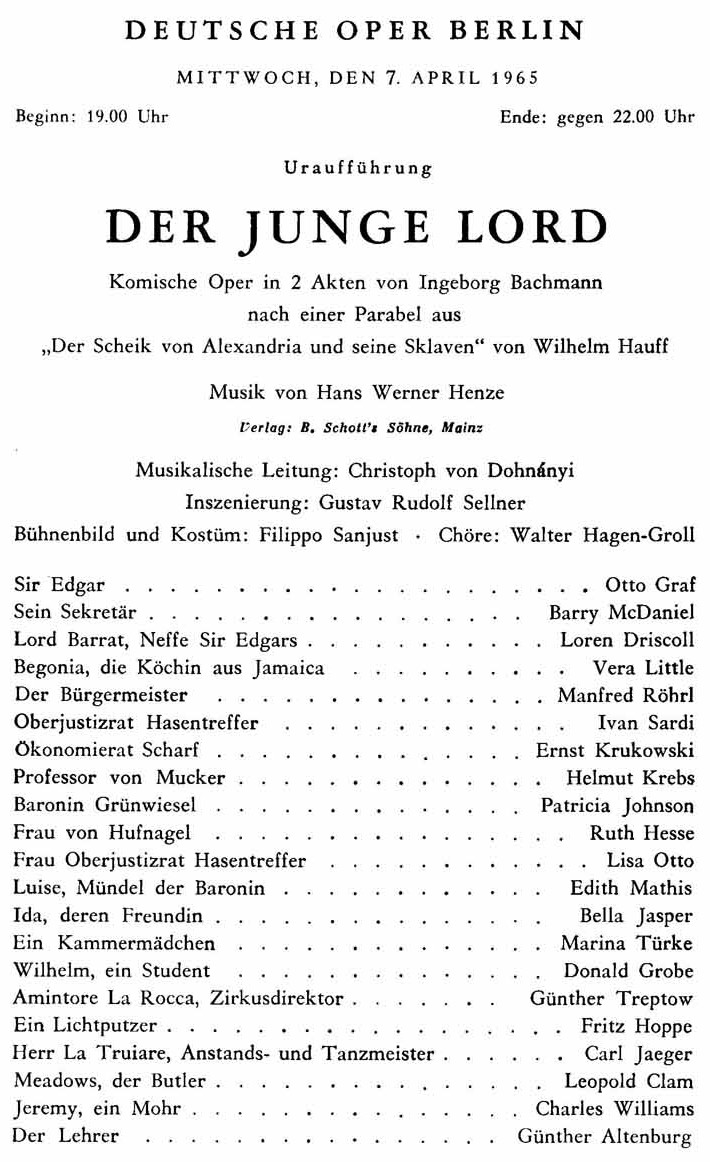
Première of Henze's Der junge Lord, Berlin 1965

From 1962 to 1995, Hesse was engaged by the Deutsche Oper Berlin, where she learned a broad repertoire. She took part in the world premiere of Henze's Der junge Lord on 7 April 1965, singing the role of Frau von Hufnagel.

From the second half of the 1960s Hesse made her first appearances at major opera houses in Europe in new roles. In 1965, she performed at the Vienna State Opera as both Ortrud and Eboli in Verdi's Don Carlos. A year later, she appeared as Brangäne in Wagner's Tristan und Isolde at the Opéra National de Lyon. In 1968 she was invited by the Holland Festival to sing Herodias in Salome by Richard Strauss. Hesse made her Royal Opera House debut in 1969 as the Nurse in Richard Strauss's Die Frau ohne Schatten. When she reprised the role there in 1975, the critic for The Musical Times described her performance as "tirelessly ingenious and vocally in splendid command". In 1972, she appeared at the Paris Opéra Garnier in Mozart's Le nozze di Figaro, and again as the Nurse, In 1974 and 1975 she was the Nurse in an acclaimed production at the Salzburg Festival, conducted by Karl Böhm and directed by Günther Rennert, alongside James King and Leonie Rysanek as the imperial couple and Walter Berry and Birgit Nilsson as the Dyer and his wife, in a production that was recorded. She performed at the Festival the following year as Kundry in Wagner's Parsifal, alternating with Régine Crespin.

Hesse also gave guest performances at the Grand Théâtre de Bordeaux, Opéra de Marseille, Théâtre du Capitole in Toulouse, Chorégies d'Orange and Grand Théâtre de Genève, Théâtre Royal de la Monnaie in Brussels, De Nationale Opera in Amsterdam, Gran Teatre del Liceu in Barcelona, Royal Swedish Opera in Stockholm and the Bolshoi Theatre in Moscow. She also performed in several Italian opera houses, including the Teatro dell'Opera di Roma, Teatro Regio di Torino and La Fenice in Venice. Invitations to North America took her to the San Francisco Opera, Lyric Opera of Chicago and Washington National Opera and to Mexico City. In South America she performed at the Teatro Colón of Buenos Aires and the Rio de Janeiro Opera. A tour by the Deutsche Oper Berlin also brought her to Japan.

Hesse was a regular guest at the Vienna State Opera from 1965 to 1988, where she appeared as Herodias, the Nurse, Ortrud, Brangäne, Magdalene, Fricka and Waltraute, Eboli, as well as Amneris in Verdi's Aida, Azucena in his Il trovatore, Maddalena in his Rigoletto and Preziosilla in his La forza del destino, Giulietta in Offenbach's Les contes d'Hoffmann and Burija in Janáček's Jenůfa. In 1982 she was appointed a Kammersängerin. On 29 November 1988, she retired from the house as Herodias.

Hesse also performed in concert, including a performance of Salome at Carnegie Hall in New York in 1975. In 1970, Hesse portrayed Gertrud in a TV film of Hänsel und Gretel.

=== Personal life ===
Hesse married director Siegwulf Turek in 1976. They had met in 1975 at the Salzburg Festival where she appeared in Die Frau ohne Schatten and he served as an assistant to the production's set designer, Günther Schneider-Siemssen. After her retirement, Hesse lived in Hallstatt, Upper Austria. She was awarded the state's cultural medal.

Hesse died there on 13 July 2024, at the age of 87.

== Roles ==
=== World premieres ===
- 1963 Milhaud: Oresteia (24 April) – Deutsche Oper Berlin (world premiere of the 3rd part Les Eumenides)
- 1965 Hufnagel's wife in Henze's Der junge Lord (7 April) – Deutsche Oper Berlin

=== Repertoire ===
Bartók:

- Judith in Bluebeard's Castle

Bizet:

- Title role in Carmen

Gluck:

- Orpheus in Orfeo ed Euridice

Hindemith:

- Gräfin von Helfenstein in Mathis der Maler

Humperdinck:

- Gertrud in Hänsel und Gretel

Janáček:

- Buryja in Jenůfa

Korngold:

- Barbara in Violanta

Mozart:

- Marcellina in Le nozze di Figaro
- Third Lady in Die Zauberflöte

Offenbach:

- Giulietta in Les contes d'Hoffmann

Strauss:

- Herodias in Salome
- Klytämnestra in Elektra
- Amme in Die Frau ohne Schatten

Stravinsky:

- Jocasta in Oedipus Rex

Verdi:

- Maddalena in Rigoletto
- Azucena in Il trovatore
- Preziosilla in La forza del destino
- Amneris in Aida
- Eboli in Don Carlos
- Mrs. Quickly in Falstaff

Wagner:

- Mary in Der fliegende Holländer
- Ortrud in Lohengrin
- Brangäne in Tristan and Isolde
- Magdalene in Die Meistersinger von Nürnberg
- Floßhilde and Fricka in Das Rheingold
- Roßweiße, Schwertleite and Fricka in Die Walküre
- Floßhilde and Waltraute in Götterdämmerung
- Flower Girl, Knappe, voice from above, and Kundry in Parsifal

== Recordings ==
=== Operas ===
- Henze: Der junge Lord, with Edith Mathis (Luise); Donald Grobe (Wilhelm), Barry McDaniel (secretary of Sir Edgar), Loren Driscoll (Lord Barrat), Ruth Hesse (Hufnagel's wife) and Vera Little (Begonia); Orchestra and Choir of the Deutsche Oper Berlin and the Schöneberger Sängerknaben, conductor: Christoph von Dohnányi (in the world premiere production directed by Gustav Rudolf Sellner), DG 449 875-2 (double CDs) / Medici Arts 2072398 (DVD) 1967
- Korngold: Violanta, with Walter Berry (Simone Trovai), Eva Marton (Violanta), Siegfried Jerusalem (Alfonso), Horst Laubenthal (Giovanni Bracca), Gertraut Stoklassa (Bice), Ruth Hesse (Barbara), Manfred Schmidt (Mateo), Heinrich Weber, Paul Hansen, Karin Hautermann, Renate Freyer; Chor des Bayerischen Rundfunks, Bavarian Radio Symphony Orchestra, conductor: Marek Janowski, Choir conductor: Heinz Mende, CBS Masterworks 1980
- Smetana: Die verkaufte Braut, excerpts with Barry McDaniel, Cvetka Ahlin, Melitta Muszely, Martti Talvela, Ruth Hesse, Rudolf Schock, Kurt Böhme; Choir and Orchestra of the Deutsche Oper Berlin, conductor: Heinrich Hollreiser, LP, Album, Electrola
- Strauss: Die Frau ohne Schatten, with James King (Emperor), Leonie Rysanek (Empress), Walter Berry (Dyer), Birgit Nilsson (Dyer's Wife), Ruth Hesse (Nurse), Orchestra of the Wiener Staatsoper, Karl Böhm, DG 1977, live, shortened
- Wagner: Lohengrin, with Otto von Rohr, Herbert Schachtschneider (Lohengrin), Leonore Kirschstein (Elsa), Heinz Imdahl (Friedrich von Telramund), Ruth Hesse (Ortrud), Hans Helm, Konzertvereinigung Wiener Staatsopernchor, Large Symphony Orchestra (with members of the Czech Philharmonic), conductor: Hans Swarowsky, aufgenommen im August 1968, Augsburg: Weltbild Classics 1996.
- Wagner: Tristan und Isolde, with Ingrid Bjoner (Isolde), Hans Beirer (Tristan), Walter Kreppel (King Marke), Ruth Hesse (Brangäne), Otto Wiener etc.; Choir and Orchestra of the Wiener Staatsoper, live, c. 1970
- Wagner: Tristan und Isolde, with Birgit Nilsson (Isolde), Jon Vickers (Tristan), Hans Sotin (Marke), Ruth Hesse (Brangäne), Hans Günter Nöcker, Anton Dermota among others; Choir and Orchestra of the Wiener Staatsoper, live 5 December 1976
- Wagner: Die Meistersinger von Nürnberg, with Horst Lunow, Theo Adam (Hans Sachs), Eberhard Büchner, Ruth Hesse (Magdalene), Zoltán Kelemen, Geraint Evans, Peter Schreier (David), Karl Ridderbusch, René Kollo (Walther von Stolzing), Helen Donath (Eva); Staatskapelle Dresden, conductor: Herbert von Karajan, EMI Classics

==== DVD ====
Hesse performed on DVD as Mary in Wagner's Der fliegende Holländer, with Donald McIntyre in the title role, in 1965, and as Brangäne in Tristan und Isolde (with Nilsson and Jon Vickers in 1973, filmed in the Roman Theatre of Orange. Alan Blyth wrote in a review for Gramophone in 2004: "Ruth Hesse sings an ample-sounding Brangäne of a kind hardly heard today, and interprets the part with apt sympathy."

=== Choral works ===
- Bach: Christmas Oratorio, with Heather Harper, Thomas Page, Kieth Engen, Wiener Symphoniker, conductor Hans Swarowsky
- Mozart: Requiem, with Heather Harper, Thomas Page, Kieth Engen; Orchestra of the Wiener Staatsoper, Wiener Kammerchor, conductor: Pierre Colombo. Festival Classique
