= Margarethe Bence =

American opera singer (1930–1992)

- Born: August 13, 1930; Kingston, New York, US
- Died: April 1, 1992 (aged 61); Munich, Germany
- Occupations: Operatic mezzo-soprano; operatic contralto; academic voice teacher
- Organizations: Württembergische Staatsoper; Bavarian State Opera; Vienna State Opera

Margarethe Bence (August 13, 1930 – April 1, 1992) was an American opera singer, who sang both mezzo-soprano and contralto parts and was mostly active in German and Austria, including international festivals such as the Bayreuth Festival and the Salzburg Festival. Her repertoire included music from Baroque to contemporary premieres.

== Career ==
Born in Kingston, New York, in a German-American family on August 13, 1930, Bence began her voice studies in the United States. She toured with the Robert Shaw Chorale from 1950 to 1953, when she continued her studies in Stuttgart. Her teachers included Res Fischer and Ellinor Junker-Giesen.

She appeared first in concert, especially in alto-parts of oratorios. In 1956 she joined the ensemble of the Württembergische Staatsoper, where she remained for 14 years. She studied a broad repertory, from Baroque to contemporary music, playing as both comic and tragic characters. She appeared as a guest artist, first in 1959 when the Stuttgart Opera performed Wagner's Parsifal at the Vienna State Opera. She was engaged there for Handel's Jephtha, with Fritz Wunderlich, and for Janáček's Jenůfa. In 1961, she appeared at the Opéra de Monte-Carlo as Annina in Der Rosenkavalier by Richard Strauss, which became one of her signature roles.

From 1962 she was invited to international festivals. She performed at the Bayreuth Festival, in 1962 as Rossweisse and Waltraute in Der Ring des Nibelungen, the next year also Erda in Das Rheingold and Siegfried, and a small part in Parsifal. In 1965 she performed Rossweisse once more.

She sang at the Bavarian State Opera first in 1963, the role of Babekan in the premiere of Werner Egk's Die Verlobung in San Domingo. In 1966, she appeared at the Schwetzingen Festival in the premiere of Hermann Reutter's Der Tod des Empedokles, and she made her debut at the Salzburg Festival as Marcellina in Mozart's Le nozze di Figaro. The new production was staged by Günther Rennert and conducted by Karl Böhm, with Claire Watson and Ingvar Wixell as the noble couple, Reri Grist and Walter Berry as Susanna and Figaro, and Edith Mathis as Cherubino. The production stayed in the repertory until 1971, always with Bence as Marcellina.

Bence moved to the Bavarian State Opera in 1970, where she sang among others Annina in the production conducted by Carlos Kleiber which was recorded. She appeared as a guest internationally, including Berlin, Bucharest, Paris, Rome, Rio de Janeiro and San Francisco. From 1976 on, she was a member of the Vienna State Opera for eleven years, where she performed 266 times in 27 parts. She also appeared at the Wiener Volksoper. From the 1970s, she was a voice teacher in Vienna and at the Musikhochschule Stuttgart. Her students included Malin Hartelius and Anna Korondi.

Margarethe Bence died in Munich on April 1, 1992, aged 61.

== Selected parts ==
=== Premieres ===
- 1963: Die Verlobung in San Domingo by Werner Egk (after Heinrich von Kleist) – Bavarian State Opera
- 1966: Der Tod des Empedokles by Hermann Reutter (after Friedrich Hölderlin's unfinished play) – Schwetzingen Festival
- 1981: Baal by Friedrich Cerha (after Bertolt Brecht's early play) – Salzburg Festival (Hausfrau, Ältere Dame)

=== Repertoire ===
Alban Berg:

- Garderobiere and Lulu's mother in Lulu

Gottfried von Einem:

- Second Woman in Der Besuch der alten Dame
- Frau Miller in Kabale und Liebe (after the 1784 play by Friedrich Schiller

Wolfgang Fortner:

- Magd in Bluthochzeit

Handel:

- Storge in Jephtha

Hans Werner Henze:

- Baronin Grünwiesel in Der junge Lord

Leoš Janáček:

- Magd, Tante, Schäferin, Frau des Dorfrichters in Jenůfa

Ernst Krenek:

- Juana in Karl V.

Pietro Mascagni:

- Lucia in Cavalleria rusticana

Jules Massenet:

- Dienerin in Manon

Mozart:

- Marcellina in Le nozze di Figaro
- Third Lady in Die Zauberflöte

Mussorgski:

- Xenia's Amme in Boris Godunov

Puccini:

- Abbess in Suor Angelica

Rossini:

- Marcellina in Il barbiere di Siviglia

Smetana:

- Ludmilla, Hata in The Bartered Bride

Richard Strauss:

- Schleppträgerin, Magd in Elektra
- Annina in Der Rosenkavalier
- Dryade in Ariadne auf Naxos
- Adelaide, Kartenaufschlägerin in Arabella
- Haushälterin in Die schweigsame Frau

Verdi:

- Mrs. Quickly in Falstaff

Wagner:

- Mary in Der fliegende Holländer
- Erda in Das Rheingold
- Rossweisse, Schwertleite in Die Walküre
- Erda in Siegfried
- Waltraute in Götterdämmerung
- Voice from above, flower maiden, second Knappe in Parsifal

== Selected recordings ==
=== Opera ===
- Berg: Lulu, Wiener Sofiensäle 1976, cond.: Christoph von Dohnányi – Garderobiere
- Mozart: Le nozze di Figaro, Salzburg Festival 1966, cond.: Karl Böhm – Marcellina
- Smetana: Prodaná nevesta, film 1976, cond.: Jaroslaw Krombholc – Ludmilla
- Strauss: Der Rosenkavalier, Bavarian State Opera 1973, cond.: Carlos Kleiber – Annina
- Wagner: Parsifal, Bayreuth Festival 1963, cond.: Hans Knappertsbusch – Second Knappe

=== Concert ===
- Bach: Mass in B minor, 35. Deutsches Bachfest 1958, cond.: Hans Grischkat
- Bach: Ein feste Burg ist unser Gott, BWV 80, Württembergisches Kammerorchester 1967, cond.: Helmuth Rilling
- Bach: Schleicht, spielende Wellen, BWV 206, Bach-Collegium Stuttgart [1968], cond.: Helmuth Rilling
- Bach: Der zufriedengestellte Aeolus, BWV 205, Bach-Collegium Stuttgart [1972], cond.: Rilling
- Handel: Messiah, with Fritz Wunderlich and Otto von Rohr, 1959, cond.: Heinz Mende
- Mozart: Requiem, Stuttgarter Philharmoniker [1964], cond.: Roland Bader
- Mendelssohn: Elias, Stuttgarter Philharmoniker 1963, cond.: Bader
- Pergolesi: Stabat mater, Stuttgart 1957, cond.: Frieder Bernius
- Reger: An die Hoffnung für Alt und Orchester, Op. 124, cond.: Hermann Scherchen
- Vivaldi: Gloria in D major, Stuttgart [1957], cond.: Marcel Couraud
