= Schöneberger Sängerknaben =

German boys' choir

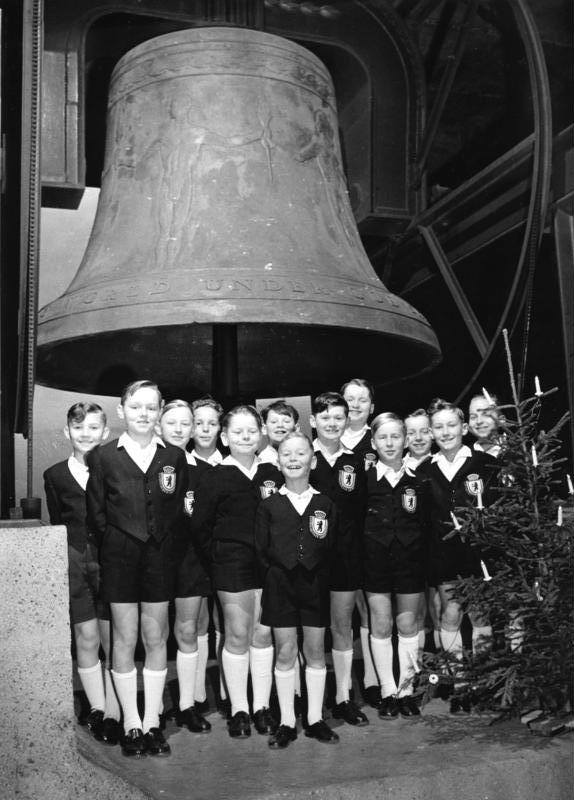
Schöneberg Boys' Choir sing Christmas under the Liberty Bell in Schöneberg Town Hall (1958)

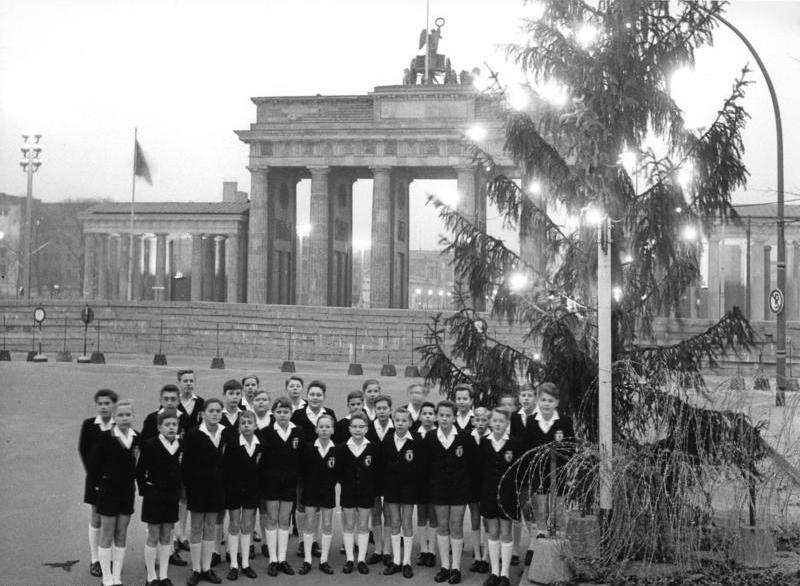
Schöneberg Boys' Choir sing Christmas carols in front of the Berlin Wall (1961)

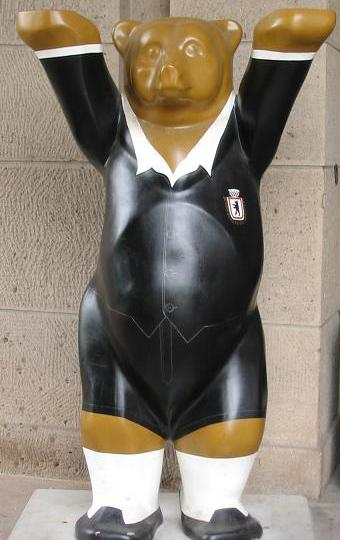
Schöneberg Boys' Choir Buddy Bear in front of the Schöneberg Town Hall, standing in front of the Kaiser Wilhelm Memorial Church to bid farewell to Gerhard Hellwig.

The Schöneberger Sängerknaben were a German boys' choir, named after the Schöneberg district of Berlin. The choir was in existence between 1947 and 2011, and performed with about 30 boys at a time. They wore short black trousers, black blazers with emblems, white shirts and white knee socks. The repertoire initially included German folk songs, Berlin popular songs and Schlager, later also opera choruses and other classical works.

== Career ==
The Schöneberger Sängerknaben was founded by Gerhard Hellwig on 12 November 1947. Hellwig trained the boys and initially sang with them in old people's homes, hospitals and in Berlin squares. Only two years after its foundation, the then manager of the Deutsche Oper Berlin, Heinz Tietjen, brought the choir into his opera house and engaged it for the performance of the opera Tannhäuser by Richard Wagner. This was the prelude to more than 3100 opera performances in over 50 different productions in several languages, including, from 1954, the Bayreuth Festival, whose artistic organisation office Gerhard Hellwig headed from 1959.

In 1956, the young singers were featured in the film Hochzeit auf Immenhof and a year later also in Ferien auf Immenhof with songs by Hans-Martin Majewski. In 1958, the choir sang the first song of the Deutsche Fernsehlotterie, Kleine Leute, große Reise. Five years later, the choir accompanied the singer Bully Buhlan on his song Junge Herzen haben Sehnsucht, the song of the ARD television lottery in 1963. The versatile choir, which among other things recorded an LP with Manuela with songs from fairy tale land, was featured in numerous television events.

In addition to its many performances and engagements, the choir also undertook over 300 concert tours, taking it to many countries in Europe and overseas, including the Montreal Expo 67 in 1967.

== Dissolution of the choir ==
Gerhard Hellwig died on 15 January 2011. With his death, the Schöneberger Sängerknaben also ceased their work.

== Successful titles ==
- Auf Wiedersehen
- Pack die Badehose ein with Cornelia Froboess
- Berliner Jungens, die sind richtig
- Unsere Stadt hört doch nicht am Brandenburger Tor auf

== Recordings ==
Albums (selection):

- Weiße Weihnacht 1975 (together with the Berliner Kammerchor, large Berlin Symphony Orchestra and organ, recorded in the Rosary Basilica (Berlin), Berlin-Steglitz)
- Deutsche Volkslieder (with Richard Clayderman) 1988
- Gruß an Potsdam 1992
- Wir wollen Freunde sein – 50 Jahre Schöneberger Sängerknaben 1997
- Mach auf dein Herz zur Weihnachtszeit – Fröhliche Weihnachten with the Schöneberger Sängerknaben
- Man muss mal ab und zu verreisen 2004
- Berliner Jungens, die sind richtig 2004
- Soundtrack: „Für immer Immenhof“, Bear-Family BCD 16644 AS, ISBN 3-89916-015-0, with the music from the first three Immenhof films, partly sung by the choir
- Henze: Der junge Lord, with Edith Mathis (Luise); Donald Grobe (Wilhelm), Barry McDaniel (Secretary of Sir Edgar), Loren Driscoll (Lord Barrat), Ruth Hesse (Frau von Hufnagel) und Vera Little (Begonia); Orchestra and choir of the Deutsche Oper Berlin and the Schöneberger Sängerknaben, conductor: Christoph von Dohnányi (in the world premiere production of Gustav Rudolf Sellner), Deutsche Grammophon 449 875-2 (double-CD) / Medici Arts 2072398 (DVD) 1967
