= Janis Martin (soprano) =

American opera singer (1939–2014)

- Janis Martin, in the 1980s
- Born: August 16, 1939; Sacramento, California, U.S.
- Died: December 14, 2014 (aged 75); San Antonio, Texas
- Education: California State University, Sacramento; University of California, Berkeley
- Occupation: Operatic mezzo-soprano

Janis Martin (August 16, 1939 – December 14, 2014) was an American opera singer who performed leading roles first as a mezzo-soprano and later as a soprano in opera houses throughout Europe and the United States. She was particularly known for her performances in the operas of Richard Wagner and sang at the Bayreuth Festival from 1968 to 1997.

== Biography ==
Martin was born in Sacramento, California, the daughter of a radio producer. She studied at both California State University, Sacramento and the University of California, Berkeley. She began to study singing in Sacramento with Julia Monroe and later studied in New York with Lili Wexberg and Otto Gruth. She made her operatic debut in 1960 at San Francisco Opera as Theresa in Bellini's La sonnambula and at 21 was the youngest member of the company that season. She continued to sing a number of comprimario mezzo-soprano roles with the company through 1969, including Sister Anne in the 1961 world premiere of Norman Dello Joio's opera Blood Moon. She returned as a soprano in 1970 in the title role of Puccini's Tosca and appeared there regularly though 1990, when she sang the role of Brünnhilde in Die Walküre, Siegfried, and Götterdämmerung for the company's complete performance of Wagner's Ring cycle.

On March 23, 1962, she won the National Finals of Metropolitan Opera National Council Auditions singing "Mon cœur s'ouvre à ta voix" from Samson et Dalila by Saint-Saëns. Her New York City Opera debut that same year was as Mrs. Grose in The Turn of the Screw. Her Metropolitan Opera (Met) debut came on December 19, 1962, as Flora Bervoix in Verdi's La traviata alongside Anna Moffo in the title role. She appeared in 147 performances at the Met between 1962 and 1997, first in mezzo-soprano roles, including Singer in the 1964 US premiere of Menotti's The Last Savage and from 1973 leading soprano roles including Kundry in Wagner's Parsifal, Marie in Alban Berg's Wozzeck, Senta in Wagner's Der fliegende Holländer, and Tosca. Her final appearance with the company was in 1997 when she appeared as Brünnhilde in Die Walküre with Plácido Domingo as Siegmund and Deborah Voigt as Sieglinde.

Martin performed with Deutsche Oper Berlin from 1971 to 1988 and at the Bayreuth Festival from 1968 to 1997, as Eva and Magdalena (Die Meistersinger von Nürnberg); Fricka, Sieglinde, and Brünnhilde (Die Walküre); Gutrune and 2nd Norn (Götterdämmerung); Fricka and Freia (Das Rheingold) and Kundry (Parsifal). Her performances in other European opera houses include Venus (Tannhäuser), Marie (Wozzeck) and The Woman (in Schoenberg's Erwartung) at La Scala; Marie at the Royal Opera House; Brünnhilde at the Vienna State Opera, Isolde (1981) and Kundry at the Oper Zürich (1981), and Ariadne at the Staatsoper Hannover (1982) Martin retired from the stage in 2000 to live in Nevada County, California, where she gave singing lessons and occasional recitals and concerts.

=== Personal life ===
Martin's first husband was French horn player and World War II veteran, Boris Rybka. They lived together in Europe and Sacramento. Martin and her second husband, the German conductor and choirmaster Gerhard Hellwig, had a son, Robert. The marriage ended in divorce. She had a brother, Richard, and two grandchildren.

Martin died on December 13, 2014, at the age of 75.

== Recordings ==
- Arnold Schoenberg: Erwartung – Janis Martin; BBC Symphony Orchestra; Pierre Boulez, conductor (1977). Label: CBS.
- Richard Wagner: Rienzi (complete recording of Wagner's shortened 1843 version) – René Kollo, Siv Wennberg, Janis Martin, Theo Adam; Dresden Staatskapelle; Heinrich Hollreiser, conductor (1975). Label: EMI.
- Richard Wagner: Der fliegende Holländer – Norman Bailey, Janis Martin, René Kollo, Martti Talvela, Chicago Symphony Orchestra & Chorus; Sir Georg Solti, conductor (1976). Label: Decca.

== Sources ==
- Cummings, David (ed.), "Martin, Janis", International Who's Who in Classical Music 2003, Routledge, 2003, p. 509. ISBN 1-85743-174-X
- Hamilton, David (ed.), "Martin, Janis", The Metropolitan Opera Encyclopedia, Simon and Schuster, 1987, p. 214. ISBN 0-671-61732-X
