= Anna Korondi =

Hungarian soprano in opera and concert (born 1969)

- Born: 1969 (age 56–57); Budapest
- Education: Vienna Conservatory
- Occupation: Operatic soprano
- Organizations: Komische Oper Berlin; Hochschule für Musik Hanns Eisler

Anna Korondi (born 1969) is a Hungarian soprano in opera and concert. She has been an Academic voice teacher at the Hochschule für Musik Hanns Eisler in Berlin from 2013.

== Career ==
Born in Budapest to György Korondi, Korondi first studied voice in Budapest. She continued her studies at the Vienna Conservatory with Margarethe Bence and David Lutz, and graduated with distinction in 1993. She was engaged at the Komische Oper in Berlin from 1993 to 1997, then at the Bonn Opera to 1999. She appeared at the Bavarian State Opera singing the leading role of Adela in the premiere of Aribert Reimann's Bernarda Albas Haus, an opera after Lorca's play La Casa de Bernarda Alba, directed by Harry Kupfer and conducted by Zubin Mehta. She performed at the 2001 Salzburg Festival the role of Adele in Die Fledermaus by Johann Strauss, directed by Hans Neuenfels and conducted by Marc Minkowski. She appeared as Zdenka in Arabella by Richard Strauss at the Bavarian State Opera in 2006. Roles by Mozart have included Ilia in Idomeneo, Susanna in Le nozze di Figaro, Zerlina in Don Giovanni, Servilia in La clemenza di Tito and Pamina in Die Zauberflöte. She also appeared as Nanetty in Verdi's Falstaff, Musetta in Puccini's La bohéme and Valenciennes in Lehar's Die lustige Witwe, among others.

Korondi appeared at the Bayreuth Festival as a Flower Maiden in Wagner's Parsifal, first in 2004 in the production by Christoph Schlingensief, conducted by Pierre Boulez, then in 2008 in the production by Stefan Herheim.

Korondi won the ARD International Music Competition in 1996. She has been an Academic voice teacher at the Hochschule für Musik Hanns Eisler in Berlin from 2013.
