= Die Jakobsleiter =

Oratorio by Arnold Schoenberg

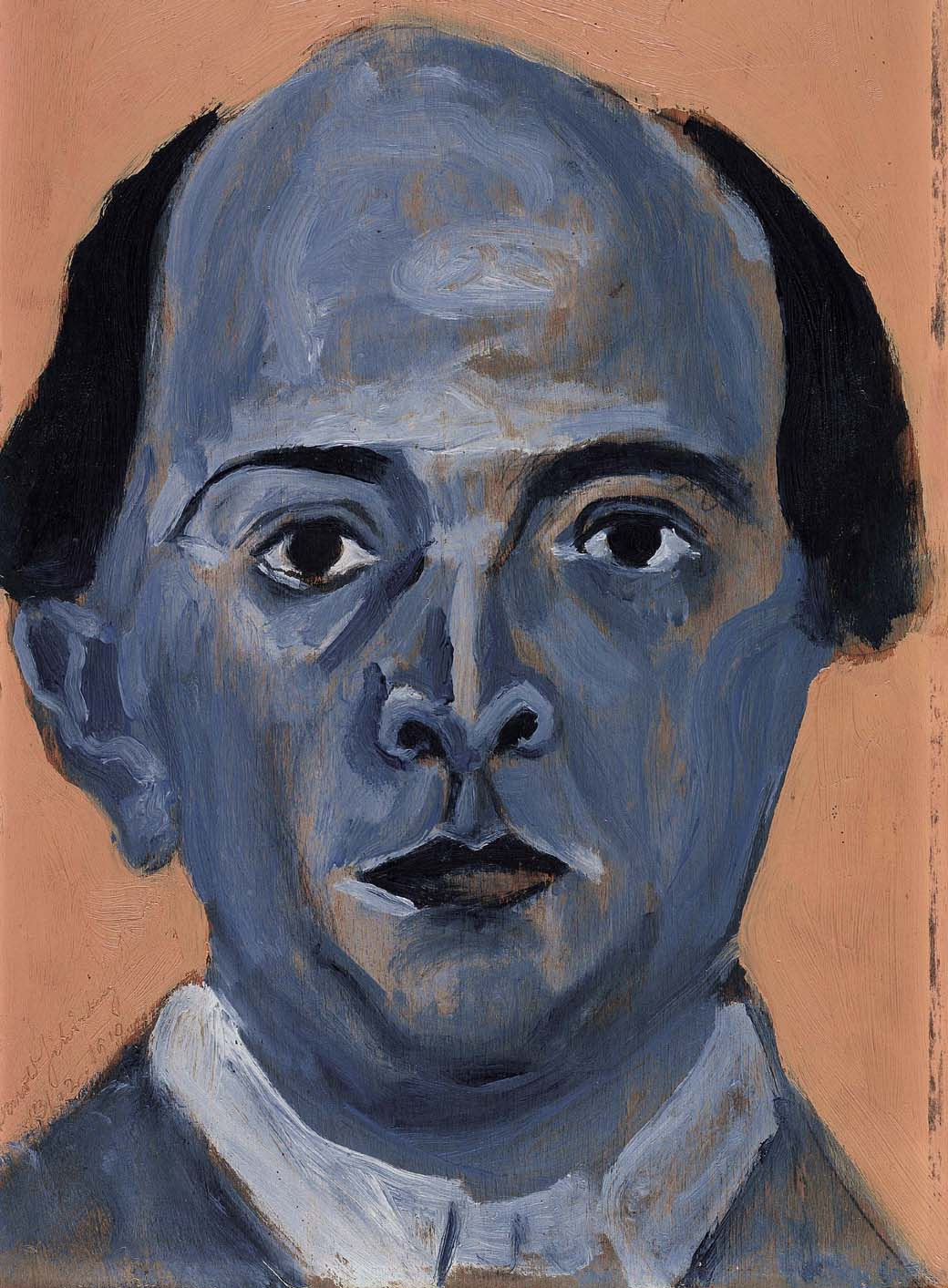
Self-portrait by Arnold Schoenberg, 1910

Hexachord ostinato, in cello, which opens Die Jakobsleiter

Die Jakobsleiter (Jacob's Ladder) is an oratorio by Arnold Schoenberg that marks his transition from a contextual or free atonality toward the twelve-tone technique anticipated in the oratorio's use of hexachords. Though unfinished by Schoenberg, the piece was ultimately completed and prepared for performance by Schoenberg student Winfried Zillig at the request of Gertrude Schoenberg.

Schoenberg began the libretto in 1914–15, which he published as a stand-alone text in 1917. He began the music in 1915, finishing most of his work on it in 1926, and finished a small amount of orchestration in 1944, leaving 700 measures at his death.

The piece is also notable for its use of developing variation.

The fragment received a partial premiere (1958) of only 160 bars or measures, and was premiered as far as possible in Vienna on June 16, 1961, conducted by Rafael Kubelik. All performances before 1968 were concert performances; the American premiere took place in 1968 at the Santa Fe Opera using a staging by director Bodo Igesz. It was repeated in 1980. In 1968 a "scenic performance", the oratorio version of what for opera would be a staged performance, was given. The score was first published in 1974 by the composer's publisher Belmont.

Notable recordings include conductors Robert Craft's (on Columbia Records) and Pierre Boulez's (on CBS, 1982), the latter featuring Siegmund Nimsgern as Gabriel (with Ian Partridge, Anthony Rolfe Johnson and Mady Mesplé in other singing roles).
