= Wuthering Heights (Floyd opera) =

1958 opera by Carlisle Floyd

- Opera by Carlisle Floyd
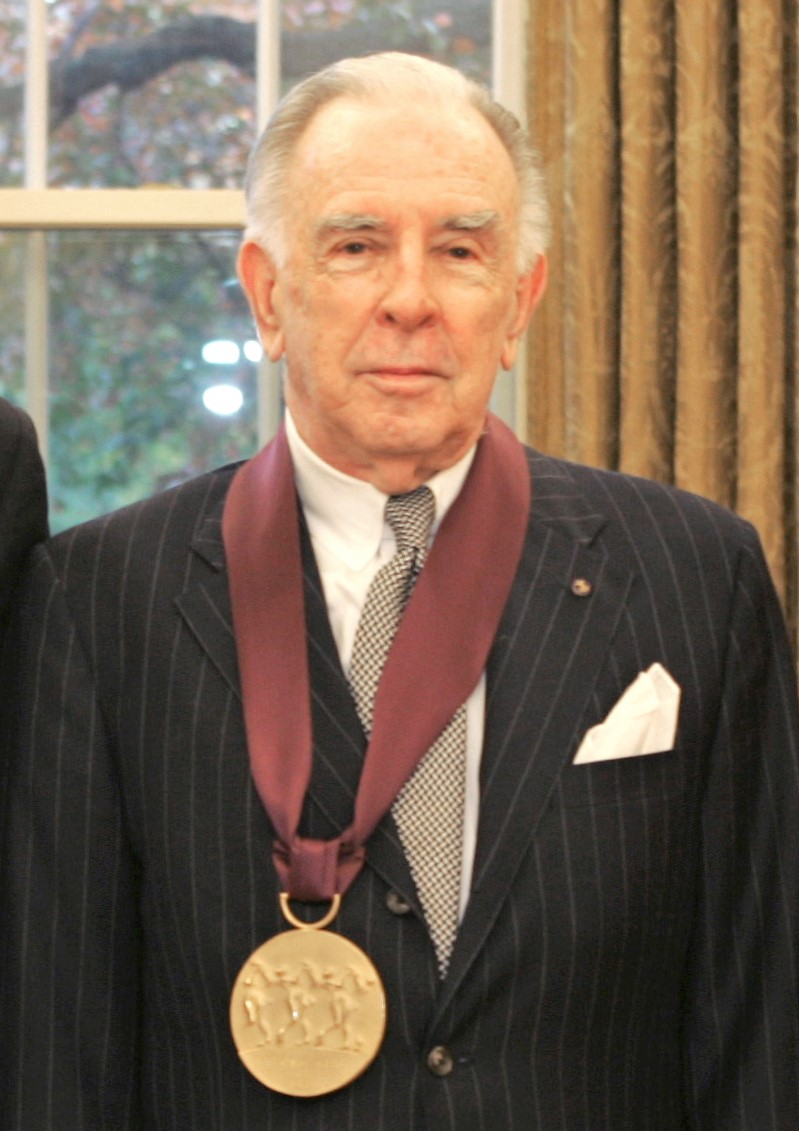
- Carlisle Floyd in 2004 with the National Medal of Arts
- Librettist: Floyd
- Language: English
- Based on: Wuthering Heights by Emily Brontë
- Premiere: July 16, 1958; Santa Fe Opera

Wuthering Heights is an opera in a prologue and three acts with music and a libretto by Carlisle Floyd. The work is adapted from Emily Brontë's 1847 novel of the same name. The opera premiered at the Santa Fe Opera on July 16, 1958, in a production directed by Irving Guttman. A revised version of the work was performed at the New York City Opera in 1959 with a cast that notably included Phyllis Curtin, Patricia Neway, and Frank Porretta.

== Roles ==
Role	Voice type	Premiere cast July 16, 1958 Conductor: John Crosby
Heathcliff, An orphan brought by Mr Earnshaw to live at Wuthering Heights, loves Catherine Earnshaw	baritone	Robert Trehy
Catherine Earnshaw, Daughter of Mr Earnshaw, loves Heathcliff	soprano	Phyllis Curtin
Hindley Earnshaw, Catherine's brother	tenor	Davis Cunningham
Edgar Linton, of Thrushcross Grange, becomes Catherine's husband	tenor	Loren Driscoll
Isabella Linton, Edgar's sister, becomes Heathcliff's wife	soprano	Mildred Allen
Mrs. Linton	mezzo-soprano	Elaine Bonazzi
Nelly Dean, Housekeeper at Wuthering Heights	mezzo-soprano	Regina Sarfaty
Mr Lockwood, Heathcliff's tenant	tenor	David Dodds
Joseph, Elderly servant at Wuthering Heights	tenor	Nico Castel
Mr Earnshaw, Father of Catherine and Hindley	bass	John Macurdy

== Recording ==
Wuthering Heights Georgia Jarman Kelly Markgraf Florentine Opera Company; Milwaukee Symphony Orchestra, Joseph Mechavich Reference Recordings: FR-721
