= Ingeborg Hallstein =

German coloratura soprano (born 1936)

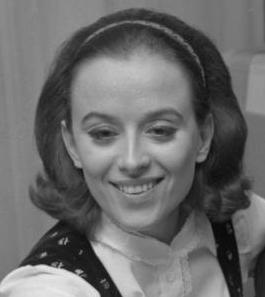
- Hallstein in 1966
- Born: 23 May 1936 (age 90); Munich, Germany
- Occupations: opera singer (soprano); singing teacher
- Organizations: Bavarian State Opera; Musikhochschule Würzburg
- Title: Kammersängerin
- Awards: Federal Cross of Merit; Bavarian Order of Merit

Ingeborg Hallstein (born 23 May 1936) is a German coloratura soprano, known for the purity and range of her voice. She had an international career as a guest singer on the opera houses of Europe and was a member of the Bavarian State Opera from 1961 to 1973. Her signature roles were the Queen of the Night in Mozart's Die Zauberflöte and Zerbinetta in Ariadne auf Naxos by Richard Strauss. She created roles including Scolatella in Henze's König Hirsch.

== Early career ==
Born in Munich, Hallstein studied with her mother, Elisabeth Hallstein, and debuted at the opera house in Passau, Germany, in 1957 as Musetta in Puccini's La bohème.

After engagements at the Theater Basel and the Staatstheater am Gärtnerplatz in Munich she made her Salzburg Festival debut in 1960 as Rosina in Mozart's La finta semplice. The same year she joined the Bavarian State Opera, a full member there from 1961 to 1973. She created the role of Scolatella in the revised version of Henze's König Hirsch in Kassel in 1963, and Autonoe in his Die Bassariden at the 1966 Salzburg Festival.

== International career ==
In the following years, Hallstein appeared as a guest to important opera houses in the world, including Deutsche Oper Berlin, Hamburg State Opera, La Fenice in Venice, and the Teatro Colón in Buenos Aires. She also sang at the Royal Opera House in London with Otto Klemperer and first sang one of her signature roles for the reopening of the Theater an der Wien, the Queen of the Night in Mozart's Die Zauberflöte, conducted by Herbert von Karajan.

Her voice was well focused and she was capable of commanding dramatic phrasing and emotional expression. In opera, she sang some of the most demanding roles in the coloratura Fach. Her signature role was Zerbinetta in Ariadne auf Naxos by Richard Strauss. Her repertoire of around 60 roles included Mozart's Susanna in Le nozze di Figaro and the title role in his Zaide, Gilda in Verdi's Rigoletto and the title role of his La traviata, and Sophie in Der Rosenkavalier by Richard Strauss.

She also devoted herself to the lied, giving recitals in Germany and abroad.

== Teaching ==
In 1979, Hallstein was appointed professor at the Musikhochschule Würzburg where she taught until 2006. After initial doubts, teaching became her new passion and she decided to retire from stage and concentrate on the young talents. She has given master classes in Germany and abroad and is a sought-after juror for international singing competitions.

== Recordings, films and television ==
An exclusive contract with Deutsche Grammophon resulted in numerous recordings of operas, operettas and songs. These recordings reflect an artist with a refined approach to ornamentation and a confident performance style in technically demanding virtuoso works.

Besides her very successful stage career, she also achieved great popularity during the 1960s and 1970s when she appeared in many operetta films such as Die Zirkusprinzessin or Wiener Blut, and musical television shows.

== Awards ==
She received the title of a Bavarian Kammersängerin in 1968 and the Federal Cross of Merit in 1979, that order's First Class in 1996, and the Bavarian Order of Merit in 1999.
