= Davis Cunningham =

American operatic singer

Thomas Davis Cunningham (May 7, 1916 – June 19, 1984) was an American tenor who had prominent career in operas, musicals, concerts, and on television from 1949 through 1973.

== Biography ==
Cunningham was born in the Philippines, the son of an American medical doctor serving in the United States military. He studied singing at Wooster College and the Juilliard School before making his professional stage debut in the 1939 musical Stars In Your Eyes where he portrayed a handful of small roles. He returned to Broadway in 1941 as Jack in Kurt Weill's Lady in the Dark. That same year he signed a contract with the Philadelphia Opera Company, joining their roster of principal tenors. However, Cunnigham was conscripted into the United States Air Force forcing him to postpone his opera career. He served as an Air Force Lieutenant during World War II from 1941 to 1946. Following the war he sang in operettas and musicals throughout the United States.

Cunningham finally made his operatic debut in 1949 with the Central City Opera and was a regular presence at that house for many years. Beginning in 1952, he sang frequently on television for the NBC Opera Theatre, including singing Pinkerton in Madama Butterfly, Prince Anatole in War and Peace, Pelléas in Pelléas et Mélisande, and Belmonte in The Abduction from the Seraglio. In 1960, he portrayed Mario Cavaradossi in Tosca for an ABC television production. On December 27, 1954, he portrayed Michele in the world premiere of Gian Carlo Menotti's The Saint of Bleecker Street on Broadway.

In 1954, Cunningham joined the roster of principal tenors at the New York City Opera, where he first appeared in the title role of The Tales of Hoffmann in 1954. His other roles with the company included Rodolfo in La bohème (1954), Prince Ramiro in La Cenerentola (1955), Ernesto in Don Pasquale (1955), and Vašek in The Bartered Bride (1955). In 1958, he portrayed Hindley Earnshaw in the world premiere of Carlisle Floyd's Wuthering Heights at the Santa Fe Opera.

Cunningham was also an active concert performer. Among his notable orchestral appearances were roles in concert performances of rare operas, including Nadir in Bizet's Les pêcheurs de perles (1953), Fernando in Enrique Granados's Goyescas (1956), and Chevalier de la Force in the New York premiere of Dialogues of the Carmelites (1964). He also sang in a program of show tunes with the New York Philharmonic under Richard Rodgers in 1954. In 1959, he was the tenor soloist in Handel's Messiah under conductor Eugene Ormandy with the Philadelphia Orchestra, soprano Eileen Farrell, contralto Martha Lipton, baritone William Warfield, and the Mormon Tabernacle Choir at Carnegie Hall. His last public performance was with the Cincinnati Symphony under conductor James Levine in 1973.

In the early 1970s, Cunningham was a member of the voice faculty at the University of Utah in Salt Lake City. In 1974 he moved to San Diego where he taught singing out of a private studio until his death ten years later of a heart attack.
