= Otto von Rohr =

German opera singer

Otto von Rohr (24 February 1914 – 5 July 1982) was a German operatic bass.

== Life ==
Von Rohr was born in Berlin. After his education at the Musikhochschule Berlin with Hermann Weißenborn, he made his debut 1938 at the Theater Duisburg as Sarastro in The Magic Flute. He remained there until 1941 and was then engaged at the Staatstheater Stuttgart between 1941 and 1979. There he performed until his death in Leonberg

== Recordings (selection) ==
- Wagner: Lohengrin, with Otto von Rohr, Herbert Schachtschneider (Lohengrin), Leonore Kirschstein (Elsa), Heinz Imdahl (Friedrich von Telramund), Ruth Hesse (Ortrud), Hans Helm, Konzertvereinigung Wiener Staatsopernchor, Large symphony orchestra (with members of the Czech Philharmonic), conductors: Hans Swarowsky, recorded in August 1968, Augsburg: Weltbild Classics 1996.

See also Otto Von Rohr discography on WOM (World of music)
