= Malin Hartelius =

Swedish soprano (born 1966)

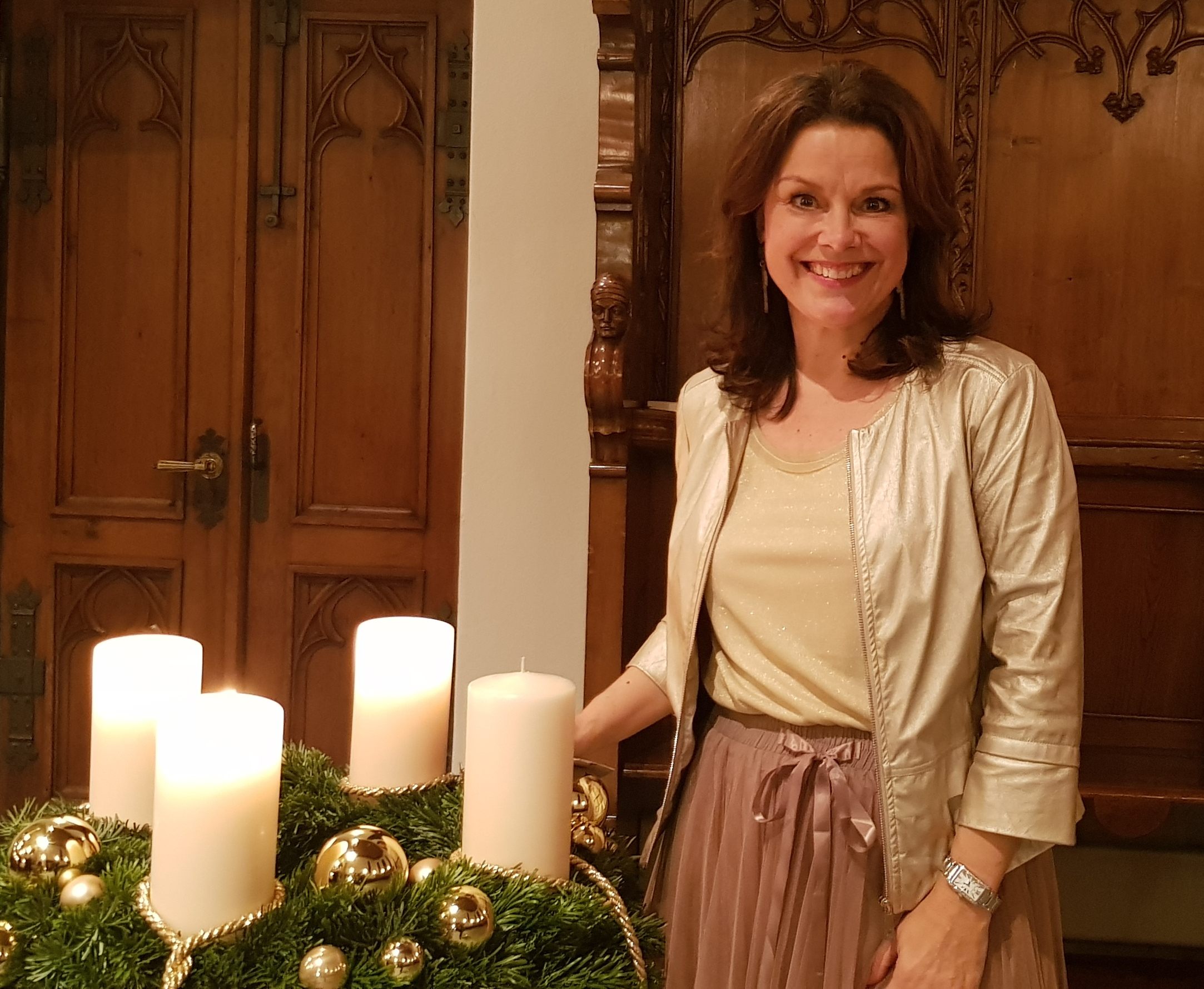
- Born: 1 September 1966 (age 59); Malmö, Sweden
- Education: Konservatorium Wien
- Occupation: Soprano singer
- Years active: 1990–present
- Organization(s): Vienna State Opera; Zürich Opera House
- Awards: Litteris et Artibus
- Website: www.malinhartelius.com

Malin Hartelius (born 1 September 1966) is a Swedish soprano who performs regularly with conductors such as Nikolaus Harnoncourt, Ton Koopman, Riccardo Chailly, Sir John Eliot Gardiner, Peter Schreier, Herbert Blomstedt, and Frans Brüggen. She has collaborated with orchestras like the Oslo Philharmonic Orchestra, the Tonhalle Orchester Zurich, the San Francisco Symphony, and the Concentus Musicus Wien.

== Life and career ==
Hartelius was born in 1966 in Malmö, Sweden. She studied at the Konservatorium Wien (Opera, Lied and Oratorio) with the celebrated teacher Margarethe Bence.

In 1989, she became a member of the Vienna State Opera Studio and joined the Theater St. Gallen where she sang her first Papagena in Mozart's The Magic Flute. As a member of the Vienna State Opera Studio in 1990–1991 season, she appeared in many roles including, Celia in Mozart's Lucio Silla and Papagena. During that season, she made her debut at the Zürich Opera again with Papagena followed by Arsena in The Gypsy Baron. In the 1991–1992 season, she became a member of the Zürich Opera and appeared as Pamina in The Magic Flute, Adele in Die Fledermaus, Blondchen in Die Entführung aus dem Serail and Ännchen in Der Freischütz.

After debuting at the Ludwigsburg Festival (1990) and Schwetzingen Festival (1991), Hartelius appeared for the first time at the Salzburg Festival in 1992 as Barbarina in The Marriage of Figaro. Upon returning to the Salzburg Festival in 1996, she began her association with conductor Franz Welser-Möst in performances of Bach's Mass in B Minor (BWV 232) and St Matthew Passion (BWV 244) with the Camerata Accademica and in 1997, she sang Blondchen in Mozart's Die Entführung aus dem Serail conducted by Marc Minkowski.

Her operatic repertoire continues to expand with performances of Donizetti's L'elisir d'amore and Don Pasquale, Mozart's The Magic Flute and The Marriage of Figaro and Strauss' Ariadne auf Naxos.

In the autumn of 1999, she followed an invitation from the Paris Opera, where she performed the main role in Rameau's Les Indes galantes conducted by William Christie. This opera house presented her also as Servilia in La clemenza di Tito, and in 2000 as Adele in Die Fledermaus. In the same year she also achieved success as Pamina in the new Magic Flute production at the Zürich Opera.

In recent seasons Hartelius took part as soprano soloist in John Eliot Gardiner's Bach Cantata Pilgrimage (2000), and debuted as Marzelline in Fidelio at the Bavarian State Opera. She was highly praised for her appearance in Nikolaus Harnoncourt's realisation of Schubert's rarely played opera Alfonso und Estrella at the Zürich Opera and performed at the Salzburg Festival 2000 in various concerts alongside the Vienna Philharmonic with Wolfgang Sawallisch and Charles Mackerras conducting. In the Salzburg Festival 2001 she sang Adele in the new production of Die Fledermaus and concerts with the Mozarteum Orchestra conducted by Ivor Bolton.

In Spring 2002 she sang Konstanze in Die Entführung aus dem Serail in another new production in Zürich with Klaus Maria Brandauer as Bassa Selim and Patricia Petibon as Blonde. In 2004 she made her debut as Zerlina in Don Giovanni at Glyndebourne conducted by Riccardo Chailly. Her first Susanna in The Marriage of Figaro was at the Aix-en-Provence Festival.

Highlights of last seasons included concerts with the Accademia di Santa Cecilia, Cleveland Orchestra, Royal Concertgebouw Orchestra, Leipzig Gewandhaus Orchestra, London Symphony Orchestra, Orchester des Bayerischen Rundfunks, Orchestra Sinfonica di Milano Giuseppe Verdi, Philharmonia Orchestra, Rundfunk-Sinfonieorchester Berlin and the Tonhalle Orchestra. She returned to the Palais Garnier in Paris (Rameau's Les Indes galantes) and sang Sophie (Der Rosenkavalier) in a new production in Zürich and at the Vienna State Opera, Konstanze as well as Adele (Die Fledermaus) at the Bavarian State Opera, she also made her debut as Donna Elvira (Don Giovanni) in Zürich. Invitations to festivals included the Styriarte in 2005 and the Salzburg Festival in 2006 for a series of Mozart operas.

== Honours ==
On 28 January 2010, Hartelius received the medal Litteris et Artibus from the King of Sweden for outstanding artistic work as an opera singer.

== Personal life ==
Hartelius has been married once and has two children. Hanna born in 1993 and Simon 1996.

== Recordings ==
=== Audio ===
- Mozart: Der Messias. Enoch zu Guttenberg (1995, Sony Classical)
- A German Requiem (Brahms). Enoch zu Guttenberg (recorded 1995, Farao Classics)
- The Creation (Haydn). Enoch zu Guttenberg (1998, Farao Classics)
- Bach: Various Cantatas from Pilgrimage (year 2000)
- Mozart: Il sogno di Scipione (recorded Sept 2000)
- Mozart: Great Mass in C minor, K. 427 (recorded 2001)
- Haydn: Orlando paladino (recorded July 2005)
- Bach: Christmas Oratorio (recorded 2006) [SACD]
- Haydn: Harmoniemesse (recorded 2008) [SACD, DVD]
- Gluck: Orfeo ed Euridice (2015)

=== Video ===
- Mozart: Die Entführung aus dem Serail (1991, 1997, 2003, 2004)
- Mozart: Die Zauberflöte (2000)
- Strauss: Die Fledermaus (2001)
- Monteverdi: Il ritorno d'Ulisse in patria (2002)
- Rameau: Les Indes galantes (2004)
- Weber: Der Freischütz (2004)
- Strauss: Der Rosenkavalier (2005)
- Humperdinck: Hänsel und Gretel (recorded 1999)
- Mozart: La clemenza di Tito (2007)
- Mozart: La finta semplice (2007)
- Mozart: L'oca del Cairo (2007)
- Mozart: Don Giovanni (2007)
- Mozart: Le nozze di Figaro (recorded 2007)
- Mozart: Così fan tutte (recorded 2009) [DVD and Blu-ray]
