= Das Liebesverbot =

Opera by Richard Wagner

- Opera by Richard Wagner
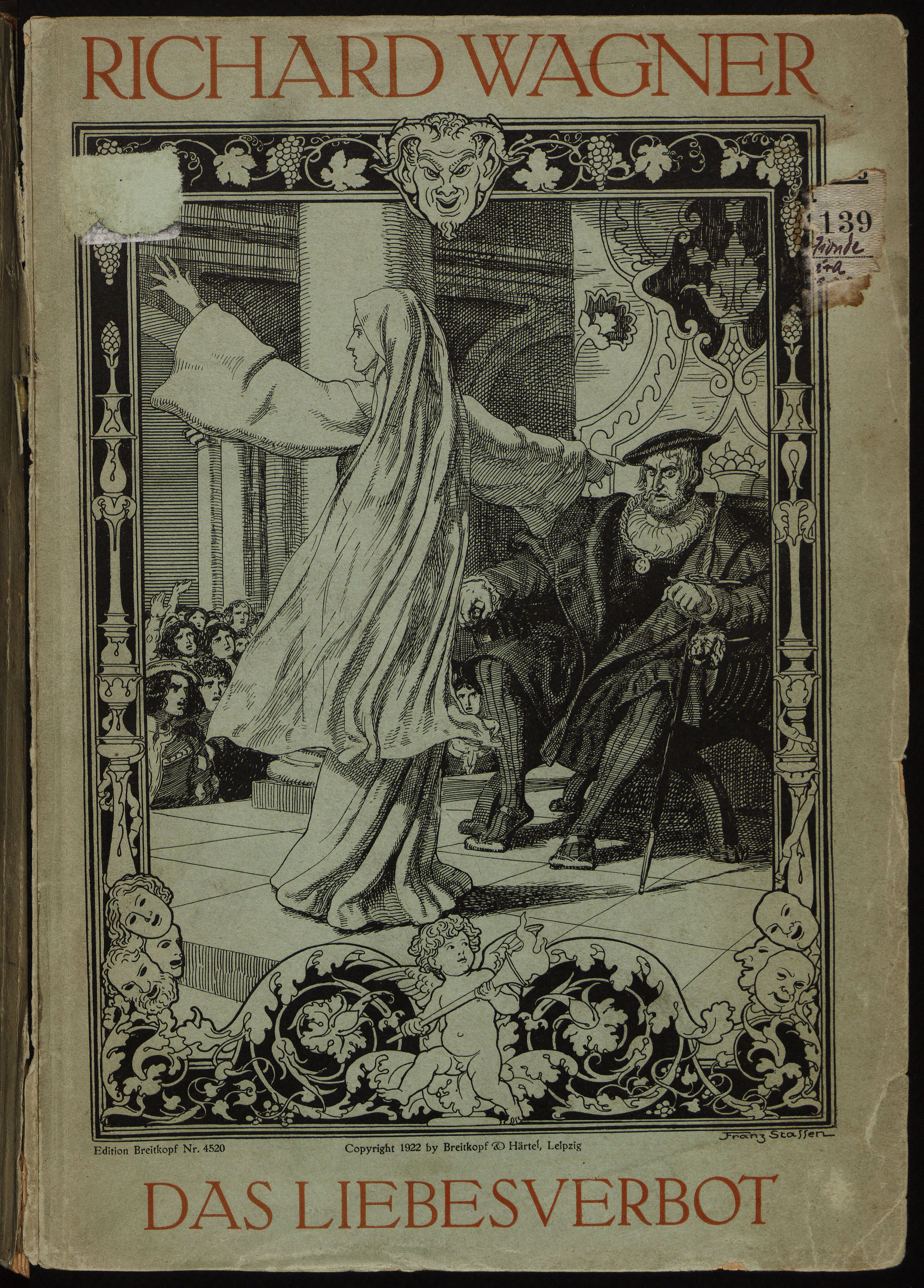
- 1922 vocal score with illustration by Franz Stassen
- Librettist: Richard Wagner
- Language: German
- Based on: Shakespeare's Measure for Measure
- Premiere: 29 March 1836; Stadttheater Magdeburg

Das Liebesverbot (The Ban on Love, WWV 38), is an early comic opera in two acts by Richard Wagner, with the libretto written by the composer after Shakespeare's Measure for Measure. Described as a Große komische Oper, it was composed in early 1836.

Restrained sexuality versus eroticism plays an important role in Das Liebesverbot; these themes recur throughout much of Wagner's output, most notably in Tannhäuser, Die Walküre, and Tristan und Isolde. In each opera, the self-abandonment to love brings the lovers into mortal combat with the surrounding social order. In Das Liebesverbot, because it is a comedy, the outcome is a happy one: unrestrained sexuality wins as the carnival of the entire population goes rioting on after curtain-fall.

Das Liebesverbot was Wagner's second opera and his first to be performed, when the budding composer was just 22 years of age. It has many signs of an early work, carrying a style modeled closely on contemporary French and Italian comic opera. It is also referred to as the forgotten comedy, being one of Wagner's only two comic works, the other being the better-known Die Meistersinger von Nürnberg.

== Performance history ==
Wagner conducted the premiere in 1836 at the Stadttheater Magdeburg. Poorly attended and with a lead singer who forgot the words and had to improvise, it was a resounding flop and its second performance had to be cancelled after a fist fight between the prima donna's husband and the lead tenor broke out backstage before the curtain had even risen; only three people were in the audience. It was never performed again in Wagner's lifetime.

The opera was rarely performed over the following hundred years.

On 16 February 1965, in the United Kingdom, the first performance was given at University College, London, in a semi-professional production staged by the UCLU Music Society in the old Gymnasium.

In 1983, in North America, a successful revival was given, conducted by Wolfgang Sawallisch.

In 1990, a staged production (with reduced orchestra) was mounted in San Francisco by Pocket Opera, led by, and with an English performing translation by, Donald Pippin.

In 1994, Das Liebesverbot was performed at the Wexford Opera Festival, in Ireland.

On 19 July 2008, a fully staged production was premiered, by Glimmerglass Opera, in a production by Nicholas Muni, at the Glimmerglass Festival in Cooperstown, New York, USA. The cast was led by Mark Schnaible as Friedrich and Claudia Waite as Isabella; Corrado Rovaris conducted.

In 2009, a concert production was presented at the International Festival of Young Singers at the Kammeroper Schloss Rheinsberg plus a staged production at the Staatstheater Braunschweig in October.

Since 2011, a production of this work has formed part of the repertoire of Helikon Opera Moscow.

In 2013, 200 years after the composer's birth, it was performed in Bayreuth for the first time. A production of the Oper Leipzig was shown in the Oberfrankenhalle, a hall for sports, because Wagner had banned his early operas from the Festspielhaus. It was staged by Aron Stiehl with elements of operetta and revue; Constantin Trinks conducted the Gewandhausorchester.

On 24 September 2015, the opera premiered in Romania at the Cluj-Napoca Hungarian Opera.

In 2016, the opera was staged by the Teatro Real, Madrid.

== Roles ==
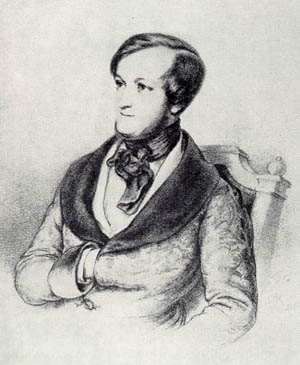
Richard Wagner (c. 1840; age 27).

Roles, voice types, premiere cast
Role	Voice type	Premiere cast, 29 March 1836 Conductor: Richard Wagner
Friedrich, governor of Sicily	bass-baritone	Gräfe
Luzio, a young nobleman	tenor	Ignaz Freimüller
Claudio, a young nobleman	tenor	Schreiber
Antonio, their friend	tenor	
Angelo, their friend	baritone	Friedrich Krug
Isabella, Claudio's sister	soprano	Karoline Pollert
Mariana, novice in a monastery	soprano	Mathilde Limbach
Brighella, captain of the watch	baritone	Wilhelm Kneisel
Danieli, an innkeeper	bass	
Dorella	soprano	Schindler
Ponzio Pilato, Danieli's servant	tenor	
Nuns, judges, guards, townspeople, musicians

== Synopsis ==
The synopsis is Wagner's own description of his scenario, in a translation by William Ashton Ellis published in 1898.

Place: Palermo
Time: 16th century

=== Act 1 ===
==== The town square ====
An unnamed King of Sicily leaves his country on a journey to Naples, as I suppose, and deputes to his appointed State-holder—called simply Friedrich, to mark him for a German—the full authority to use all royal powers in an attempt to radically reform the manners of his capital, which had become an abomination to the strait-laced minister. At the commencement of the piece we see public officers hard at work on the houses of amusement in a suburb of Palermo, closing some, demolishing others, and taking their hosts and servants into custody. The populace interferes; great riot: after a roll of the drums the chief constable Brighella (basso buffo), standing at bay, reads out the edict of the State-holder according to which these measures have been adopted to secure a better state of morals.

General derision, with a mocking chorus; Luzio, a young nobleman and jovial rake (tenor), appears to wish to make himself the people's leader; he promptly finds occasion for espousing the cause of the oppressed when he sees his friend Claudio (likewise tenor) conducted on the road to prison, and learns from him that, in pursuance of an ancient law unearthed by Friedrich, he is about to be condemned to death for an amorous indiscretion. His affianced, whom the hostility of her parents has prevented his marrying, has become a mother by him; the hatred of the relatives allies itself with Friedrich's puritanic zeal: he fears the worst, and has one only hope of rescue, that the pleading of his sister Isabella may succeed in softening the tyrant's heart. Luzio promises to go at once to Isabella in the cloister of the Elisabethans, where she has lately entered her novitiate.

==== A convent ====
Within the quiet cloister walls we make the acquaintance of this sister, in confidential converse with her friend Marianne, who also has entered as novice. Marianne discloses to her friend, from whom she has long been parted, the sad fate that has brought her hither. By a man of high position she had been persuaded to a secret union, under the pledge of eternal fidelity; in her hour of utmost need she had found herself abandoned, and even persecuted, for the betrayer proved to be the most powerful personage in all the state, no less a man than the King's present State-holder.

Isabella's horror finds vent in a tempest of wrath, only to be allayed by the resolve to leave a world where such monstrosities can go unpunished.—When Luzio brings her tidings of the fate of her own brother, her abhorrence of his misdemeanour passes swiftly to revolt against the baseness of the hypocritical State-holder who dares so cruelly to tax her brother's infinitely lesser fault, at least attainted with no treachery. Her violence unwittingly exhibits her to Luzio in the most seductive light; fired by sudden love, he implores her to leave the nunnery for ever and take his hand. She quickly brings him to his senses, yet decides, without a moment's wavering, to accept his escort to the State-holder in the House of Justice.

==== A courtroom ====
Here the trial is about to take place, and I introduce it with a burlesque examination of various moral delinquents by the chief constable Brighella. This gives more prominence to the seriousness of the situation when the gloomy figure of Friedrich appears, commanding silence to the uproarious rabble that has forced the doors; he then begins the hearing of Claudio in strictest form. The relentless judge is upon the point of passing sentence, when Isabella arrives and demands a private audience of the State-holder.

She comports herself with noble moderation in this private colloquy with a man she fears and yet despises, commencing with nothing but an appeal to his clemency and mercy. His objections make her more impassioned: she sets her brother's misdemeanour in a touching light, and pleads forgiveness for a fault so human and in nowise past all pardon. As she observes the impression of her warmth, with ever-greater fire she goes on to address the hidden feeling of the judge's heart, which cannot possibly have been quite barred against the sentiments that made her brother stray, and to whose own experience she now appeals for help in her despairing plea for mercy. The ice of that heart is broken: Friedrich, stirred to his depths by Isabella's beauty, no longer feels himself his master; he promises to Isabella whatever she may ask, at price of her own body.

Hardly has she become conscious of this unexpected effect, than, in utmost fury at such incredible villainy, she rushes to door and window and calls the people in, to unmask the hypocrite to all the world. Already the whole crowd is pouring in to the judgment hall, when Friedrich's desperate self-command succeeds in convincing Isabella, by a few well-chosen phrases, of the impossibility of her attempt: he would simply deny her accusation, represent his offer as a means of detection, and certainly find credence if it came to any question of repudiating a charge of wanton insult.

Isabella, ashamed and bewildered, recognises the madness of her thought, and succumbs to mute despair. But while Friedrich is displaying his utmost rigour afresh to the people, and delivering sentence on the prisoner, Isabella suddenly remembers the mournful fate of Marianne; like a lightning flash, she conceives the idea of gaining by stratagem what seems impossible through open force. At once she bounds from deepest sorrow to the height of mirth: to her lamenting brother, his downcast friend, the helpless throng, she turns with promise of the gayest escapade she will prepare for all of them, for the very Carnival which the State-holder had so strenuously forbidden shall be celebrated this time with unwonted spirit, as that dread rigorist had merely donned the garb of harshness the more agreeably to surprise the town by his hearty share in all the sport he had proscribed.

Everyone deems her crazy, and Friedrich chides her most severely for such inexplicable folly: a few words from her suffice to set his own brain reeling; for beneath her breath she promises fulfilment of his fondest wishes, engaging to despatch a messenger with welcome tidings for the following night.

Thus ends the first act, in wildest commotion.

=== Act 2 ===
==== A prison ====
What the heroine's hasty plan may be, we learn at the beginning of the second, where she gains admittance to her brother's jail to prove if he is worth the saving. She reveals to him Friedrich's shameful proposals, and asks him if he craves his forfeit life at this price of his sister's dishonour? Claudio's wrath and readiness to sacrifice himself are followed by a softer mood, when he begins to bid his sister farewell for this life, and commit to her the tenderest greetings for his grieving lover; at last his sorrow causes him to quite break down.

Isabella, about to tell him of his rescue, now pauses in dismay; for she sees her brother falling from the height of nobleness to weak avowal of unshaken love of life, to the shamefaced question whether the price of his deliverance be quite beyond her. Aghast, she rises to her feet, thrusts the craven from her, and informs him that he now must add to the shame of death the full weight of her contempt.

As soon as she has returned him to the jailer, her bearing once more passes to ebullient glee: she resolves indeed to chastise the weak-kneed by prolonging his uncertainty about his fate, but still abides by her decision to rid the world of the most disgraceful hypocrite that ever sought to frame its laws.

She has arranged for Marianne to take her place in the rendezvous desired by Friedrich for the night, and now sends him the invitation, which, to involve him in the greater ruin, appoints a masked encounter at one of the places of amusement which he himself has closed.

The madcap Luzio, whom she also means to punish for his impudent proposal to a novice, she tells of Friedrich's passion, and remarks on her feigned decision to yield to the inevitable in such a flippant fashion that she plunges him, at other times so feather-brained, into an agony of despair: he swears that even should the noble maid intend to bear this untold shame, he will ward it off with all his might, though all Palermo leap ablaze.

==== Outside Friedrich's Palace ====
In effect he induces every friend and acquaintance to assemble at the entrance to the Corso that evening, as if for leading off the prohibited grand Carnival procession. At nightfall, when the fun is already waxing wild there, Luzio arrives, and stirs the crowd to open bloodshed by a daring carnival song with the refrain: "Who'll not carouse at our behest, your steel shall smite him in the breast." Brighella approaching with a company of the watch, to disperse the motley gathering, the revellers are about to put their murderous projects into execution; but Luzio bids them scatter for the present, and ambush in the neighbourhood, as he here must first await the actual leader of their movement: for this is the place that Isabella had tauntingly divulged to him as her rendezvous with the State-holder.

For the latter Luzio lies in wait: he soon detects him in a stealthy masker, whose path he bars, and as Friedrich tears himself away he is about to follow him with shouts and drawn rapier, when by direction of Isabella, concealed among the bushes, he himself is stopped and led astray. Isabella comes forth, rejoicing in the thought of having restored Marianne to her faithless mate at this very moment, and in the possession of what she believes to be the stipulated patent of her brother's pardon; she is on the point of renouncing all further revenge when, breaking open the seal by the light of a torch, she is horrified at discovering an aggravation of the order of execution, which chance and bribery of the jailer had delivered into her hands through her wish to defer her brother's knowledge of his ransom.

After a hard battle with the devouring flames of love, and recognising his powerlessness against this enemy of his peace, Friedrich has resolved that, however criminal his fall, it yet shall be as a man of honour. One hour on Isabella's bosom, and then his death—by the selfsame law to whose severity the life of Claudio still shall stand irrevocably forfeit. Isabella, who perceives in this action but an additional villainy of the hypocrite, once more bursts out in frenzy of despairing grief.

At her call to instant revolt against the odious tyrant the whole populace assembles, in wildest turmoil: Luzio, arriving on the scene at this juncture, sardonically adjures the throng to pay no heed to the ravings of a woman who, as she has deceived himself, assuredly will dupe them all; for he still believes in her shameless dishonour.

Fresh confusion, climax of Isabella's despair: suddenly from the back is heard Brighella's burlesque cry for help; himself entangled in the coils of jealousy, he has seized the disguised State-holder by mistake, and thus leads to the latter's discovery. Friedrich is unmasked; Marianne, clinging to his side, is recognised. Amazement, indignation, joy: the necessary explanations are soon got through; Friedrich moodily asks to be led before the judgment-seat of the King on his return, to receive the capital sentence; Claudio, set free from prison by the jubilant mob, instructs him that death is not always the penalty for a love-offence.

Fresh messengers announce the unexpected arrival of the King in the harbour; everyone decides to go in full carnival-attire to greet the beloved prince, who surely will be pleased to see how ill the sour puritanism of the Germans becomes the heat of Sicily. The word goes round: 'Gay festivals delight him more than all your gloomy edicts.' Friedrich, with his newly married wife Marianne, has to head the procession; the Novice, lost to the cloister for ever, makes the second pair with Luzio.

== Recordings ==
- Robert Heger conducting the Austrian Radio Chorus and Orchestra, with Heinz Imdahl, Ernst Salzer, Anton Dermota, Kurt Equiluz, Willy Friedrich, Hilde Zadek, Christiane Sorrell, Hannelore Steffek, Ernst Salzer, Ludwig Welter, Franz Handlos, Herbert Prikopa. Vienna 1962. (Melodram, 3-LP set 244, 2-CD set 10040)
- John Bell conducting the Chor und Orchester des Internationalen Jugend-Festspieletreffens (Bayreuth, August 17–20, 1972)(Mixtur, MXT 3001/3, 1983)
- Edward Downes conducting the BBC Northern Symphony Orchestra, with April Cantelo (Isabella), Alexander Young (Luzio), Raimund Herincx (Friedrich), BBC Northern Singers. Live, complete and uncut, concert recording 23 May 1976, with bonus tracks from a 1971 Sadler's Wells Opera performance of Lohengrin, sung in English and conducted by Nicholas Braithwaite with a cast led by Margaret Curphy as Elsa, Clifford Grant as Heinrich der Vogler, Raimund Herincx as Telramund, and Judith Turner as Ortrud (Ponto POCD1055)
- Wolfgang Sawallisch conducting the Bavarian State Opera. Sabine Hass, Sarah Coburn, Robert Schunk, Hermann Prey. 1995 (Orfeo D'or)
- Sebastian Weigle conducting the Choir of the Frankfurt Opera and Frankfurter Opern- und Museumsorchester. Frankfurt am Main 2012 (Oehms Classics OC 942)
- Ivor Bolton conducting the chorus and orchestra of the Teatro Real, Madrid, 2016. (Opus Arte Blu-Ray disc OA BD 7213 D)

The overture is occasionally found on radio broadcasts and compilation CDs.

== See also ==
- Die Meistersinger von Nürnberg

== Bibliography ==
- Deathridge, John (2001). "Richard Wagner", pp. 1020–1046, in The New Penguin Opera Guide, edited by Amanda Holden. New York: Penguin / Putnam, 2001. ISBN 0-14-029312-4
- Dreyfus, Laurence (2010). Wagner and the Erotic Impulse. London: Harvard University Press. ISBN 9780674018815.
- Ellis, William Ashton, translator (1898). Richard Wagner's Prose Works. Vol. VII. In Paris and Dresden. London: Kegan Paul, Trench, Trübner.
- Magee, Bryan (2001), The Tristan Chord. New York: Henry Holt & Co. ISBN 9780805067880.
