= Kostas Paskalis =

Greek opera singer (1929–2007)

Kostas Paskalis (1 September 1929, Levadeia - 9 February, 2007, Athens) was a Greek opera singer, one of the leading baritones of the 1960s and 1970s in Europe, particularly associated with the Italian repertory.

Paskalis studied piano before turning to vocal studies at the Athens Music Conservatory. He sang in the chorus of the Athens Opera, before making his solo debut there, as Rigoletto, in 1951. His international career began in 1958, at the Vienna State Opera, as Renato in Un ballo in maschera, where he remained for 25 years, quickly establishing himself in all the major baritone roles of the Italian repertory, especially Verdi roles, notably Rigoletto, Macbeth and Iago. Macbeth was to be his debut role at both the Glyndebourne Festival in 1964, and at Covent Garden London in 1969.

In 1966, he created the role of Pentheus in Henze's Die Bassariden, at the Salzburg Festival and also sang at the premiere of the work at La Scala in 1967. Other notables roles included; Barnaba, Alfio, Tonio, Scarpia, Escamillo, etc. He made frequent guest appearances at the Rome Opera, the Munich State Opera, the Berlin State Opera, La Monnaie in Brussels, also appearing in Hamburg, Moscow, Leningrad, etc.

Though mostly active in Europe, Paskalis did appear in America. He sang Alfonso in the sensational concert performance of Lucrezia Borgia, opposite Montserrat Caballé, at Carnegie Hall, in 1965. That same year, he made his debut at the Metropolitan Opera, as Carlo in La forza del destino alongside Franco Corelli and Cesare Siepi, where he sang 16 performances there until 1967. He returned in 1973 in La forza, again as Carlo, in performances conducted by Michelangelo Veltri, and featuring Leontyne Price, Carlo Bergonzi, and Cesare Siepi. He also appeared at the San Francisco Opera, the New Orleans Opera in Nabucco with Rita Hunter and Ferruccio Furlanetto in 1978, the Houston Grand Opera, etc.

After retirement, he remained active as a voice teacher and judge at vocal competitions. He was artistic director of the Greek National Opera from 1988 to 1990. In 1969–70, he recorded Escamillo in the opéra-comique version of Carmen, opposite Grace Bumbry, Jon Vickers, and Mirella Freni, conducted by Rafael Frühbeck de Burgos, for EMI.

== Sources ==
- Opera News, Obituaries, May 2007.
