= The Bassarids =

Opera by Hans Werner Henze

- Opera by Hans Werner Henze
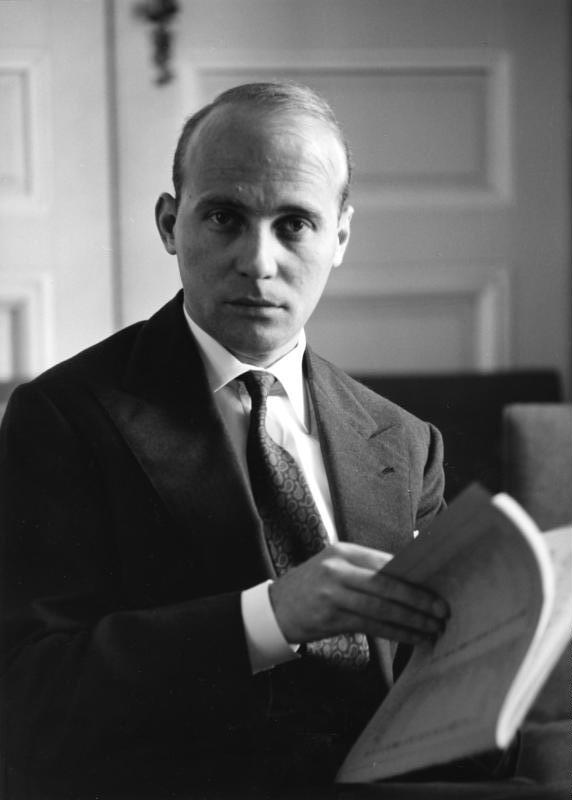
- The composer in 1960
- Native title: Die Bassariden
- Librettist: W. H. Auden; Chester Kallman
- Based on: The Bacchae by Euripides
- Premiere: 6 August 1966; Salzburg

The Bassarids (in German: Die Bassariden) is an opera in one act and an intermezzo, with music by Hans Werner Henze to an English libretto by W. H. Auden and Chester Kallman, after Euripides's The Bacchae.

The conflict in the opera is between human rationality and emotional control, represented by the King of Thebes, Pentheus, and unbridled human passion, represented by the god Dionysus.

== Background ==
The opera is constructed like a classical symphony in four 'movements':

- Movement I = sonata form
- Movement II = scherzo and trio
- Movement III = adagio and fugue
- Movement IV = passacaglia

Henze has noted that he quotes from Johann Sebastian Bach's St Matthew Passion and the English Suite No. 6 in D minor. Auden and Kallman wrote of changes that they made to the Euripides original for the purposes of this opera.

== Performance history ==
It was first performed in a German translation by Maria Basse-Sporleder in Salzburg on 6 August 1966 conducted by Christoph von Dohnányi.

The first performance using the original English text was the US premiere, at the Santa Fe Opera on 7 August 1968. The composer conducted, and the staging was by director Bodo Igesz. The Santa Fe cast included Loren Driscoll as Dionysus, Peter Harrower as Cadmus, Regina Sarfaty as Agave, Charles Bressler as Tiresias, Joan Caplan as Beroe, John Reardon as Pentheus, Evelyn Mandac as Autonoë, and Thomas Jamerson as the Captain of the Royal Guard.

A concert scheduled to be given by the BBC in London on 22 September 1968 was cancelled, so the British premiere was at the English National Opera in October 1974, with the composer conducting.

In October 1990, two concert performances sung in the original English were given at Severance Hall in Cleveland, Ohio, by the Cleveland Orchestra and Chorus with soloists Vernon Hartman, Kenneth Riegel, and, in the role of Agave, Anja Silja. Christoph von Dohnányi, who was married to Silja at the time, conducted. This same production was repeated at Carnegie Hall in November 1990 at the New York premiere, which was attended by the composer.

In March 1968, The Bassarids was performed at Teatro alla Scala in Milan, conducted by Nino Sanzogno in an Italian translation by Fedele D'Amico. In June 2018, a production under the direction of Kent Nagano with the Vienna Philharmonic was performed in Madrid at the Auditorio nacional de musica before heading on to the Salzburg Festival for performances in July/August 2018. These performances were in English.

== Roles ==
Roles, voice types, premiere cast
Role	Voice type	Premiere cast, 6 August 1966 Conductor: Christoph von Dohnányi)
Dionysus, voice and stranger	tenor	Loren Driscoll
Tiresias, an old blind prophet	tenor	Helmuth Melchert
Cadmus, founder and former king of Thebes	bass	Peter Lagger
Agave, his daughter, mother of Pentheus	mezzo-soprano	Kerstin Meyer
Beroe, an old slave, once nurse to Semele and Pentheus	contralto	Vera Little
Captain of the Royal Guard	baritone	William Dooley
Pentheus, king of Thebes	baritone	Kostas Paskalis
Autonoë, daughter of Cadmus	soprano	Ingeborg Hallstein
A female slave in Agave's household	silent	
Her daughter	silent	
Chorus of bassarids, citizens of Thebes, guards, servants

== Synopsis ==
The setting is ancient Thebes. Prior to the opera, Dionysus has stated that he intends to revenge himself upon Agave and the women of Thebes because they have denied his divinity.

At the start of the opera, Cadmus, King of Thebes, has abdicated his throne in favour of his grandson Pentheus. Pentheus has learned of the cult of Dionysus, which involves wild and irrational revelry. Pentheus plans to ban the cult from his city. A stranger arrives in town and seduces the citizens into increasingly frenetic celebration of the god Dionysus. Because Pentheus is unaware of his own irrational, "Dionysiac" impulses, or tries to suppress them, Dionysus can entrance Pentheus and intrude upon his nature to the point that Pentheus disguises himself as a woman, and goes to Mount Cytheron, where the revelry is occurring. In the course of events, the spell over the citizens extends to Agave, Pentheus' mother, and Autonoe, Pentheus' sister. Pentheus is killed and torn to pieces, and his city brought to ruin. Without realising it, Agave cradles the severed head of her son in her arms. The Stranger is revealed to be Dionysus himself.

== Instrumentation ==
- Woodwind: 4 flutes (2nd with B foot, 3rd doubling piccolo, 4 doubling alto flute and piccolo), 2 oboes, 2 english horns, 4 clarinets (3rd and 4th doubling on alto saxophone, 4th also on E-flat clarinet), bass clarinet (also alto saxophone and tenor saxophone), 4 bassoons (4th doubling on contrabassoon)
- Brass: 6 horns, 4 trumpets (4th doubling on bass trumpet), 3 trombones, 2 tubas
- Percussion (8 players):
  - timpani
  - 3 cow bells, small triangle, pair of cymbals, 3 tamtams, snare drum, military drum (with and without snares), 3 tom-toms, 3 bongos, bass drum (with or without cymbals), maracas, whip, ratchet, metal blocks, glockenspiel, xylophone, vibraphone, marimba, finger cymbals, tubular bells, wood blocks, suspended cymbals
- 2 harps, 2 pianos, celesta, strings
- On-stage band: 4 trumpets (exchangeable with orchestra's trumpets), 2 guitars, 2 mandolins, 3 cow bells
- Prologue (ad. lib.): Dyonisus (tenor), timpani, legno, bass drum, vibraphone, marimba, harp, piano, tape

== Recordings ==
- Gerd Albrecht, conductor; Kenneth Riegel, Andreas Schmidt, Michael Burt, Robert Tear, Karan Armstrong, Ortrun Wenkel, William B. Murray, Celina Lindsey; Berlin Radio Symphony Orchestra; 1986, Koch Schwann International (314-006)
- Christoph von Dohnányi, conductor; Loren Driscoll, Kostas Paskalis, Peter Lagger, Helmut Melchert, William Dooley, Kerstin Meyer, Ingeborg Hallstein, Vera Little; Choir of the Vienna State Opera; Vienna Philharmonic; 2003, ORFEO International (C 605,032 I)
- Kent Nagano, conductor; Sean Panikkar, Russell Braun, Willard White, Nikolai Schukoff, Károly Szemerédy, Tanja Ariane Baumgartner, Vera-Lotte Böcker, Maria Dur; Choir of the Vienna State Opera; Vienna Philharmonic; 2018, Live from the Felsenreitschule, Salzburg Festival, Arthaus Musik.
