= Die Verlobung in San Domingo =

Die Verlobung in San Domingo (The Engagement in San Domingo) is a 1960 opera by Werner Egk after Heinrich von Kleist, premiered on 22 November 1963 at the Bavarian State Opera.

== Recording ==
- Die Verlobung in San Domingo – Evelyn Lear, Margarethe Bence, Hans Günter Nöcker, Hamid Nasseri, Fritz Wunderlich, Richard Holm, Bayerisches Staatsorchester, Werner Egk
