= Bodo Igesz =

Dutch stage director

Bodo Igesz (February 7, 1935 in Amsterdam – December 25, 2014 in New York City) was a Dutch stage director who had an active career staging operas around the world during the second half of the 20th century. He was particularly known for his work with the Metropolitan Opera where he worked for 25 years on the staging staff. He also staged operas for the Salzburg Festival, and staged numerous operas for the Santa Fe Opera; including the United States premieres of Hindemith's Cardillac (1967), Schoenberg's Die Jakobsleiter (1968), Henze's The Bassarids (1968) and Aribert Reimann's Melusine (1972).

A particular triumph for Igesz at the Met was his staging of Georges Bizet's Carmen which premiered in 1972 with Marilyn Horne as the title heroine and Leonard Bernstein conducting. The staging remained in the Met repertory for several years, and was notably the staging used for the first Met Carmens of Régine Crespin (1975) and Elena Obraztsova(1978). Another Met career highlight was his 1988 staging of Ariadne auf Naxos by Richard Strauss which starred Jessye Norman, Kathleen Battle, James King, Tatiana Troyanos, and Stephen Dickson. This production was Broadcast nationwide on the television program The Metropolitan Opera Presents on PBS.
