= Sabine Hass =

German operatic soprano

Sabine Hass (8 April 1949 in Braunschweig – 17 February 1999 in Klagenfurt) was a German operatic soprano, who appeared internationally, especially as a Wagner and Strauss singer, including the role of Senta in Der fliegende Holländer at the Bayreuth Festival.

== Bibliography ==
- Karl-Josef Kutsch, Leo Riemens: Großes Sängerlexikon. Munich 1999.
