= Hans Günter Nöcker =

German operatic bass-baritone (1927–2019)

- Born: 22 January 1927; Hagen, Westphalia, Germany
- Died: 20 March 2019 (aged 92)
- Occupation: Operatic bass-baritone
- Organizations: Bavarian State Opera
- Awards: Kammersänger

Hans Günter Nöcker (German: [ˈhans ˈgʏntər ˈnœkər]; 22 January 1927 – 20 March 2019) was a German operatic bass-baritone who was based at the Bavarian State Opera for decades, performing in several world premieres including Aribert Reimann's Lear, and also had an international career.

== Career ==
Born in Hagen, Nöcker was initially an actor at the theatre in Wolfenbüttel. When his singing voice was discovered, he studied with Carl Momberg in Braunschweig and Hans-Hermann Nissen and Willi Domgraf-Fassbaender in Munich. He was first trained as a bass but later turned to roles for baritone characters.

Nöcker made his stage debut as Alfio in Mascagni's Cavalleria rusticana at the Theater Münster in 1952. In the 1953–54 season he was a member of the Stadttheater Gießen. From 1954 to 1965, he worked at the Staatsoper Stuttgart, where he took part in the world premieres of Carl Orff's Comoedia de Christi Resurrectione (1957) and his Oedipus der Tyrann (1959).

Nöcker was a member of the ensemble of the Bavarian State Opera in Munich for several decades starting in 1962. He appeared at the house in major roles, including Scarpia in Puccini's Tosca, Wagner roles Klingsor in Parsifal, Telramund in Lohengrin and the title role of Der fliegende Holländer, and Strauss roles Mandryka in Arabella, Jochanaan in Salome and Orest in Elektra. He appeared as Don Pizarro in Beethoven's Fidelio, as Kurwenal in Wagner's Tristan und Isolde and as Dr. Schön in Alban Berg's Lulu. Faithful to the idea of ensemble theatre, he also took small roles. He was an outstanding actor, adding fine humour to Wagner's Beckmesser in Die Meistersinger von Nürnberg, which he first performed in 1979, and played a cynical Albert in Massenet's Werther and Gunther as a coward in Wagner's Götterdämmerung, part of the Ring Cycle production by Nikolaus Lehnhoff.

He took part in world premieres at the house, as Hoango in Werner Egk's Die Verlobung in San Domingo in 1963, and in works by Günter Bialas, Wolfgang Fortner, Manfred Trojahn and Aribert Reimann, whose writing for voices he found exceptional. The role of Gloucester in Reimann's Lear in 1978 is remembered as one of his most stirring portrayals. In 1986, he performed in the premiere of Volker David Kirchner's Belshazar.

Nöcker performed at the Bayreuth Festival from 1958, first in small roles such as Hans Schwarz in Die Meistersinger, Melot in Tristan und Isolde and a Knight in Lohengrin, and in 1984 as Beckmesser in Die Meistersinger. At the Schwetzingen Festival, Nöcker appeared in Gluck's Armida in 1966. He performed there in the premieres of Trojahn's Enrico (1991) and Eckehard Mayer's Sansibar in 1994. At the Salzburg Festival, he sang in a concert performance of Schreker's Die Gezeichneten in 1989.

He was a frequent guest at the Deutsche Oper Berlin, the Cologne Opera, the Deutsche Oper am Rhein in Duisburg and Düsseldorf, the Frankfurt Opera and the Hamburg State Opera. In Berlin, he took part in the premiere of Fortner's Elisabeth Tudor in 1972 and Reimann's Die Gespenstersonate in 1984.

Outside Germany, he performed as Klingsor at La Fenice in Venice in 1983, at the Maggio Musicale Fiorentino, the Edinburgh Festival, La Monnaie in Brussels, the Teatro Massimo in Palermo and the Royal Opera House in London. At the Vienna State Opera, he appeared as Pizarro, Holländer, Telramund, Kurwenal, Gunther, Jochanaan, as the Count in Capriccio by Richard Straus, and Leonardo in Fortner's Bluthochzeit, among others.

Nöcker was also active as a concert singer. He was titled a Bavarian Kammersänger in 1966, and in Berlin in 1977. He died on 20 March 2019.
