= Der junge Lord =

Opera by Hans Werner Henze

- Opera by Hans Werner Henze
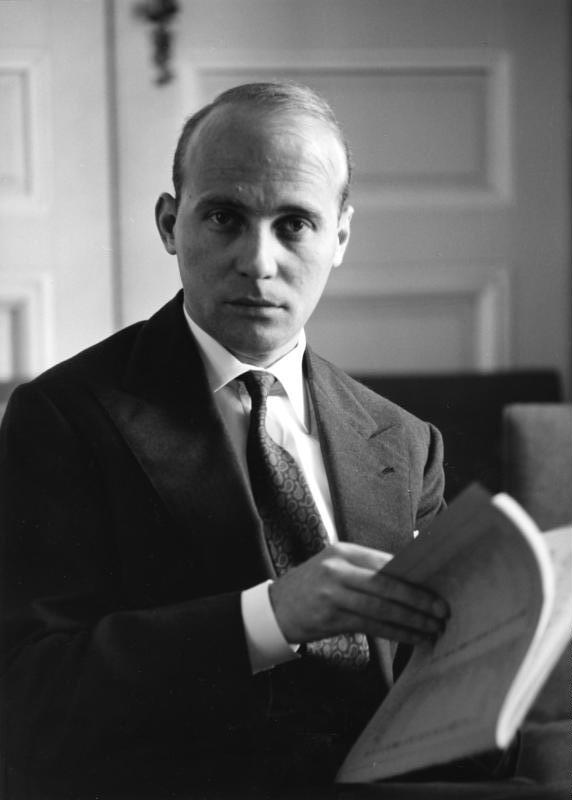
- The composer in 1960
- Librettist: Ingeborg Bachmann
- Language: German
- Based on: "Der Affe als Mensch" by Wilhelm Hauff
- Premiere: 7 April 1965; Deutsche Oper Berlin

Der junge Lord (The Young Lord) is an opera in two acts by Hans Werner Henze to a German libretto by Ingeborg Bachmann, after Wilhelm Hauff's 1827 fairy tale "Der Affe als Mensch" (The Ape as Man) from Der Scheik von Alessandria und seine Sklaven (The Sheik of Alexandria and his Slaves).

The style and plot owe much to Italian opera buffa, with the influence of Vincenzo Bellini and Gioachino Rossini noted. Andrew Porter has noted four distinct musical styles in the opera, corresponding to four different levels of characters:

- "neo-classical" style, for the townspeople;
- "neo-Straussian arioso", for Sir Edgar's entrance;
- a "wilder, more erratic" style, for the traveling circus;
- lyrical style, for Luise's love music.

Robert Henderson has commented on the Brechtian nature of Bachmann and Henze's treatment of the story.

== Performance history ==
The opera was commissioned by the Deutsche Oper Berlin, and was first performed there on 7 April 1965. The production was by Rudolf Sellner, and the conductor was Christoph von Dohnányi.

== Roles ==
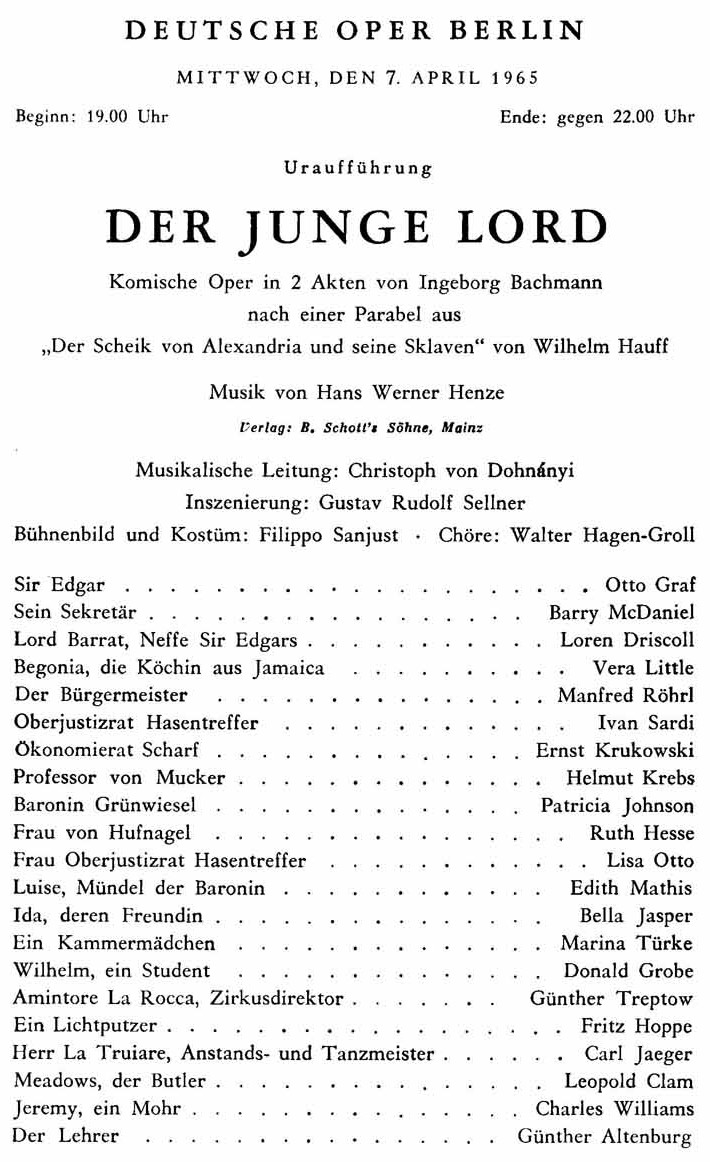
Premiere playbill, 7 April 1965, Deutsche Oper Berlin

Roles, voice types, premiere cast
Role	Voice type	Premiere cast, 7 April 1965 Conductor: Christoph von Dohnányi
Lord Barrat	tenor	Loren Driscoll
Luise	soprano	Edith Mathis
Baroness Grünwiesel	mezzo-soprano	Patricia Johnson
Secretary to Sir Edgar	baritone	Barry McDaniel
Armintore	tenor	Günter Treptow
Begonia	mezzo-soprano	Vera Little
Town mayor	bass-baritone	Manfred Röhrl
Hasentreffer	baritone	Ivan Sardi and Emil Graf
Frau Hasentreffer	soprano	Lisa Otto
Frau von Hufnagel	mezzo-soprano	Ruth Hesse
Ida	soprano	Bella Jasper
Scharf	baritone	Ernst Krukowski
Von Mucker	tenor	Helmut Krebs
Wilhelm	tenor	Donald Grobe
Sir Edgar	silent role	Otto Graf

== Synopsis ==
The opera is in two acts of three scenes each, linked by interludes.

Sir Edgar, an English gentleman and scientist, visits a small German town with a vast entourage, including black slaves and a large collection of animals. The townspeople are curious about the new personage in their town, but Sir Edgar is initially aloof to the townsfolk. Through his secretary, Sir Edgar declines all invitations to social events, and the townspeople become angry at this attitude. In scene 2 of act 1, the Baroness Grünwiesel hosts a tea and expects Sir Edgar to attend, but he does not, via a note from his Moor servant. The Baroness promises revenge on Sir Edgar for this slight. In scene 3, a traveling circus sets up their show in front of Sir Edgar's residence. Sir Edgar leaves his house for the first time since his arrival, and enjoys the circus performance. However, when city officials try to talk with Sir Edgar, he again refuses. The city officials then shut the circus down, but Sir Edgar invites the circus troupe into his mansion.

At the start of act 2, several months have elapsed. A lamplighter hears screams and groans from Sir Edgar's mansion. He reports this to the town mayor, who demands an explanation from Sir Edgar. Sir Edgar's secretary explains that the noises are from Lord Barrat, Sir Edgar's nephew (the 'young lord' of the title), who has arrived recently in Germany and is learning German, but is making mistakes and is punished with lashings. However, the prospect of a pending social event at Sir Edgar's mansion becomes evident. This is fulfilled in scene 2 of act 2, where Lord Barrat is presented to the townspeople at a social event at Sir Edgar's mansion. Lord Barrat behaves eccentrically, but the townsfolk are charmed and begin to imitate his actions. Luise, the ward of the local baroness, had previously been in love with Wilhelm, a student, but now has become enamoured of the 'young lord'. Finally, in the climactic dance, Lord Barrat's attire falls from him, and he is revealed as a trained ape.

== Recording ==
- Deutsche Grammophon 445 248-2 (CD reissue); Edith Mathis, Bella Jasper, Vera Little, Donald Grobe, Barry McDaniel, Patricia Johnson, Loren Driscoll, Manfred Röhrl, Günther Treptow; Schöneberger Sängerknaben; chorus and orchestra of the Deutsche Oper Berlin; Christoph von Dohnányi, conductor
- Unitel Classics DVD; Edith Mathis, Donald Grobe, Barry McDaniel, Loren Driscoll, Vera Little, Lisa Otto, Ernst Krukowski, Ivan Sardi, Helmut Krebs, Manfred Röhrl, Bella Jasper, Margarete Ast, Otto Graf, Charles Williams, Günther Altenburg, Leopold Klam; Schöneberger Sängerknaben; chorus and orchestra of the Deutsche Oper Berlin; Christoph von Dohnányi, conductor. Gustav Rudolf Sellner (stage director), Ernst Wild (film director), recorded in Deutsche Oper Berlin, 1968.
