= Donald Grobe =

Opera singer

Donald Roth Grobe (16 December 1929 – 1 April 1986) was an American lyric tenor who sang at the Deutsche Oper Berlin during the 1960s, 1970s and 1980s.

He made his début in Chicago, in 1952, as Borsa in Rigoletto. He sang at his first Salzburg Festival in 1962. He joined the Deutsche Oper in 1960, and sang there until his death, as well as in other important opera houses, mostly in Europe but also at the Metropolitan Opera where he sang Froh in four performances of Das Rheingold during the 1968/69 season.

He created the role of Wilhelm in Der junge Lord in the opera's world premiere as well as singing Aschenbach in the German premiere of Death in Venice and Luzio in the US premiere of Wagner's early opera, Das Liebesverbot.

He is on record as Froh in Herbert von Karajan's studio recording of Das Rheingold and on video as Don Ottavio in Ferenc Fricsay's German-translation performance of Don Giovanni from the Deutsche Oper, 1961, and as Jaquino in the opera-film Fidelio (1970) made with the forces of the Deutsche Oper, with the music recorded in 1969 by the Deutsche Oper orchestra with Karl Böhm.

== Sources ==
- Holland, Bernard, "Early Wagner Effort Has U.S. Premiere in New Jersey", The New York Times, 11 July 1983
- Kennedy, Michael and Bourne, Joyce (eds.), "Donald Grobe", The Concise Oxford Dictionary of Music, Oxford University Press, 2007 (republished on Answers.com)
- Metropolitan Opera, Grobe, Donald (Tenor), performance record on the MetOpera Database
- Sadie, Stanley (ed), "Grobe, Donald Roth", The New Grove Dictionary of Opera, Volume 2, p. 550, Macmillan Press, 1992. ISBN 0-333-48552-1
