= Gerhard Hellwig =

German conductor

- Born: 17 July 1925; Berlin, Germany
- Died: 15 January 2011 (aged 85); Berlin, Germany
- Occupation(s): conductor choir director
- Years active: 1947 - 2011

Gerhard Hellwig (17 July 1925 – 15 January 2011) was a German conductor and choir director.

== Career ==
Hellwig was born in Berlin. After returning home from captivity, he founded the Schöneberger Sängerknaben on 12 November 1947. He was also deputy director of the Oper Frankfurt, managing director of the Berliner Festwochen and co-founder of the Berliner Theatertreffen.

He recorded numerous records with the Schöneberger Sängerknaben and undertook more than 300 concert tours at home and abroad. He performed at the White House and at the German-American Steuben Parade in New York City, among other places.

Hellwig directed his boys' choir for more than sixty years until 2010, when he put the choir's work on hold due to eye surgery that same year. At Christmas 2010, he fell in his apartment building on Budapest Street and suffered a fractured neck of the femur. On 15 January 2011, he died in Berlin at the age of 85.

== Honours ==
- Verdienstkreuz 1. Klasse der Bundesrepublik Deutschland
- 1 October 1997: Order of Merit of Berlin
