= Vera Little =

American mezzo-soprano

- Vera Little in Carmen (photo with dedication)
- Born: Vera Pearl Little; December 10, 1928; Memphis, Tennessee, U.S.
- Died: October 24, 2012 (aged 83); Berlin, Germany
- Other name: Vera Little-Augustithis
- Education: Talladega College
- Occupation: Operatic mezzo-soprano
- Organizations: Deutsche Oper Berlin
- Title: Berliner Kammersängerin
- Relatives: Booker Little (brother)

Vera Pearl Little-Augustithis (December 10, 1928 – October 24, 2012) was an American operatic contralto and mezzo-soprano who belonged to the ensemble of the Deutsche Oper Berlin for more than four decades. She performed each of the important mezzo-soprano roles of the repertoire, appearing at major international opera houses and festivals. She took part in world premieres of operas by Hans Werner Henze, in 1965 Der junge Lord in Berlin and in 1966 Die Bassariden at the Salzburg Festival.

== Life ==
Little was born in Memphis, Tennessee. She won a Munich opera competition in 1950. After graduating from Talladega College in Alabama in 1952, she came to Paris to study with a Fulbright Scholarship with Georges Jouatte. She studied further in Rome, Copenhagen, and in Germany with Margarete Bärwinkel and Richard Sengeleiter.

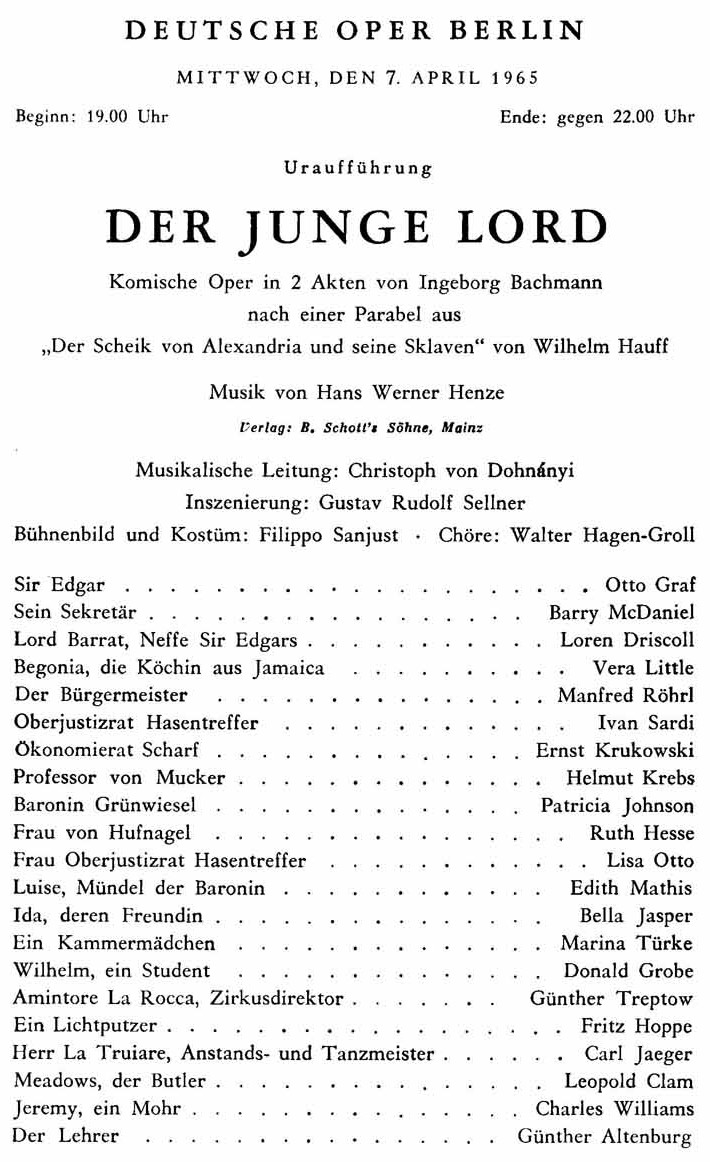
Playbill for Henze's Der junge Lord

In 1958, Carl Ebert brought her to Berlin to what was then called the "Städtische Oper Berlin", later Deutsche Oper Berlin, where she remained based for more than four decades. There she had a major success in 1963 in the title role of Bizet's Carmen. She took part in the 1965 world premiere of Hans Werner Henze's Der junge Lord, as Begonia.

She was the first African American singer to perform at the invitation of Vittorio Gui in the Vatican before Pope John XXIII, singing a Bach cantata in 1959, which made her internationally known. She appeared at the Salzburg Festival in 1966 in the world premiere of Henze's Die Bassariden. She recorded the role of Giovanna in Donizetti's Anna Bolena conducted by Alberto Erede in 1967, broadcast by Westdeutscher Rundfunk. In 1970, she was awarded the title Berliner Kammersängerin. After many negotiations and complications, she appeared in 1973 for the first time in her hometown of Memphis as Ulrica in Verdi's Un ballo in maschera.

=== Personal life ===
Little's brother was Booker Little. Besides music, she was interested in literature. She wrote poems, some of which were set to music by Boris Blacher. Some were translated by Hans Wollschläger. In 1999, she published a memoir of her career.

Little died in Berlin at the age of 84.

== Publications ==
- Little, Vera (1988). A touch of warmth. Berlin: Helvetia-Verlag. ISBN 978-3-9801987-0-7.
- —— (1978). Tears in my eyes. New York, NY: Vantage Press. ISBN 978-0-533-03311-9.
