= Heinz Imdahl =

German baritone opera singer (1924–2012)

- Born: 9 August 1924; Düsseldorf, Germany
- Died: 21 March 2012 (aged 87); Munich, Germany
- Education: Cologne Conservatory
- Occupation: Operatic baritone
- Organizations: Deutsche Oper am Rhein; Bavarian State Opera
- Awards: Order of Merit of the Federal Republic of Germany

Heinz Imdahl (9 August 1924 – 21 March 2012) was a German operatic baritone. A member of the Bavarian State Opera, he performed many leading roles at the Vienna State Opera, and appeared as Beethoven's Pizarro at the Teatro dell'Opera di Roma and Wagner's Hans Sachs at the Philadelphia Opera.

== Life ==
Imdahl was born in Düsseldorf, where his parents ran a butcher shop. After graduating from school, he completed an apprenticeship as a butcher. He then studied singing privately for seven years with the well-known singing teacher and Kammersänger Berthold Pütz in Krefeld. After the Second World War, further studies at the Musikhochschule Köln followed. He made his stage debut in 1948 at the Opernhaus Düsseldorf as Sergeant Moralès in Bizet's Carmen, directed by Gustaf Gründgens. At the beginning of his career, he sang the lyrical baritone repertoire. He was engaged at the Düsseldorf Opera until 1951 and again from 1955 to 1962, then the Deutsche Oper am Rhein. He was a member of the Bavarian State Opera in Munich from 1959 to 1988, where he was awarded the title Kammersänger.

Imdahl had a guest contract with the Staatstheater Nürnberg from 1958 to 1970. There he sang among others Jochanaan in Salome, Hans Sachs in Die Meistersinger von Nürnberg (1963; conductor: Hans Gierster) and Jago in Otello. Imdahl also had a guest contract with the Zürich Opera House, where he appeared in 1955 as Amonasro in Verdi's Aida, later as Count Luna in Il trovatore, Pizarro in Beethoven's Fidelio and Scarpia in Tosca.

Between 1961 and 1970 he appeared regularly at the Vienna State Opera; he made his debut there as Olivier in Capriccio in January 1961. He performed the roles of Pizarro in 1970, the Speaker in Mozart's Die Zauberflöte, and the music teacher in Ariadne auf Naxos by Richard Strauss. His Wagner roles there included the title role in Der fliegende Holländer (The Flying Dutchman), first sung in 1966 and repeated at the Hamburg State Opera and Santiago de Chile Opera. He also appeared in Vienna as Telramund in Lohengrin from 1966, Kurwenal in Tristan und Isolde from 1964, Hans Sachs in Die Meistersinger von Nürnberg from 1964, Wotan in Die Walküre in 1969 and Amfortas in Parsifal in 1968.

In Italy, he performed at the Teatro Comunale di Firenze in 1953 as Wolfram in Wagner's Tannhäuser, the Teatro dell'Opera di Roma in 1958 as the Speaker and in 1970 as Pizarro, the Teatro Regio di Torino in 1967 as Telramund, in 1971 as Kurwenal, in 1972 as Wanderer in Wagner's Siegfried, at the Teatro Comunale di Bologna as Wotan (1966) and Wanderer (1968), the Teatro San Carlo in Naples in 1970 as Jochanaan, in 1972 as Wotan, in 1974 as Wanderer, and at the Teatro Lirico Giuseppe Verdi in Trieste in 1975 as Faninal in Der Rosenkavalier by Richard Strauss.

Imdahl also gave guest performances in Europe at La Monnaie in Brussels (1964), the Lausanne Opera (1965, as Kurwenal), the Opéra National de Lyon (1966, as Kurwenal), and The Royal Opera House in 1972, as the music teacher in a production of the Bavarian State Opera. He performed overseas at the Rio de Janeiro Opera in 1954 and at the Philadelphia Opera in 1970 as Hans Sachs, among others.

== Private life ==
In 1961 Imdahl and his wife Johanna took over the Chiemgauhof restaurant and hotel in Übersee am Chiemsee, Germany. Since 1999 the Chiemgauhof has been run by one of Imdahl's two sons. He died in Munich on 21 March 2012 at the age of 87 and was buried in Übersee.

== Recordings ==
Imdahl recorded two complete operas: a radio recording of Wagner's Das Liebesverbot, made in 1963 by the ORF, in the role of the governor Friedrich, and a studio recording of Lohengrin from August 1968, under the musical direction of Hans Swarowsky, with Imdahl as Telramund. There are also a few live and private recordings from Imdahl's time in Düsseldorf: Rigoletto (with Anneliese Rothenberger, Hans Hopf and Walter Kreppel), Verdi's Macbeth (1957, with Astrid Varnay as Lady Macbeth) and Verdi's Falstaff, conducted by Alberto Erede. In addition, a 1963 live recording of Pfitzner's Palestrina from the Bavarian State Opera was released on CD, conducted by Joseph Keilberth, with Imdahl as Giovanni Morone.

== Honours ==
- 1980: Order of Merit of the Federal Republic of Germany
