= Loren Driscoll =

American opera singer (1928–2008)

Driscoll in 1962

Loren Driscoll (April 14, 1928 – April 8, 2008) was an American tenor who had an active international career from the 1950s through the mid-1980s. Driscoll was particularly noted for his performances in contemporary operas and sang in many world premieres.

== Biography ==
Driscoll was born in Midwest, Wyoming and after studies at Syracuse University and Boston University made his professional operatic debut in 1954 as Dr. Cajus in Verdi's Falstaff with Opera of Boston. During the late 1950s and early 1960s Driscoll sang several roles with Santa Fé Opera. He made his company debut there in 1957 as Tom Rakewell in Stravinsky's The Rake's Progress and went on to sing Edgar Linton in the world premiere of Carlisle Floyd's Wuthering Heights (1958) and Hermann in the United States premiere of Paul Hindemith's Neues vom Tage (1961). In 1962 Driscoll became a principal singer with the Deutsche Oper Berlin and remained based with company for the next 25 years, while also singing at the Salzburg Festival, Glyndebourne, and several other European and North American opera houses. His great performance at the Deutsche Oper Berlin as Lord Barrat in the opera Der junge Lord by Hans Werner Henze (1965) awarded him the honorary title of "Kammersänger".

He made his Metropolitan Opera debut in 1966 as David in Die Meistersinger von Nürnberg, a role he sang 23 times with the company between 1966 and 1972. He also appeared at the Met as Alfred in their 1967 production of Die Fledermaus.

In the 1950s Driscoll also sang in several Broadway musicals: as the Imam of the Mosque/The Bangle Man in Kismet, Freddy Eynsford-Hill in My Fair Lady, and Jerry Devine in the premiere of Marc Blitzstein's Juno (1959). Also for Blitzstein, Driscoll performed the role of Leo Hubbard in the composer's Regina with the New York City Opera in 1958, and appears on the recording of that production. Also on record, he can be heard singing in English language performances of Stravinsky's Renard the Fox and The Wedding (the recording of which features Samuel Barber, Aaron Copland, Lukas Foss, and Roger Sessions playing the four pianos). Both recordings were conducted by Stravinsky himself.

Driscoll died in Berlin, on April 8, 2008.

== Opera roles created ==
Roles created by Loren Driscoll include:

- Shridaman in Peggy Glanville-Hicks' Transposed Heads (Phoenix Theatre, New York City, 1958)
- Edgar Linton in Carlisle Floyd's Wuthering Heights (Santa Fe Opera, 1958)
- Pedro de Alvarado in Roger Sessions' Montezuma (Deutsche Oper Berlin, 1964)
- Lord Barrett in Hans Werner Henze's Der junge Lord (Deutsche Oper Berlin, 1965)
- Dionysos in Henze's The Bassarids (Salzburg Festival, 1966).
- Eumaeus in Luigi Dallapiccola's Ulisse (Deutsche Oper Berlin, 1968)
- The Architect in Aribert Reimann's Melusine (Schwetzingen Festival, 1971)
- First Officer in Wilhelm Dieter Siebert's Der Untergang der Titanic (The Sinking of the Titanic) (Deutsche Oper Berlin 1979).

== Sources ==
- Boosey & Hawkes, Siebert, Wilhelm Dieter: Untergang der Titanic (1979)
- Cummings, David (ED.), "Driscoll, Loren", International Who's Who in Classical Music, Routledge, 2003, p. 206. ISBN 1-85743-174-X
- Metropolitan Opera, Performance record: Driscoll, Loren (Tenor), MetOpera Database
- Time Magazine, "The Theater: New Musical on Broadway", 23 March 1959
