= Harry Kupfer =

German opera director (1935–2019)

- Harry Kupfer, c. 1980
- Born: 12 August 1935; Berlin, Germany
- Died: 30 December 2019 (aged 84); Berlin, Germany
- Education: Theaterhochschule Leipzig
- Occupations: Opera director; Academic
- Organizations: Komische Oper Berlin; Hochschule für Musik Franz Liszt, Weimar; Hochschule für Musik "Hanns Eisler"
- Awards: Nationalpreis der DDR; Order of Merit of the Federal Republic of Germany

Harry Alfred Robert Kupfer (12 August 1935 – 30 December 2019) was a German opera director and academic. A long-time director at the Komische Oper Berlin, he worked at major opera houses and at festivals internationally. Trained by Walter Felsenstein, he worked in the tradition of realistic directing. At the Bayreuth Festival, he staged Wagner's Der fliegende Holländer in 1978 and Der Ring des Nibelungen in 1988. At the Salzburg Festival, he directed the premiere of Penderecki's Die schwarze Maske in 1986 and Der Rosenkavalier by Richard Strauss in 2014.

== Career ==
Born in Berlin, Kupfer studied theatre at the Theaterhochschule Leipzig from 1953 to 1957. He was the assistant director at the Landestheater Halle, where he directed his first opera, Dvořák's Rusalka, in 1958. From 1958 to 1962, he worked at the Theater Stralsund, then at the Theater in Karl-Marx-Stadt, from 1966 as opera director at the Nationaltheater Weimar, also lecturing at the Hochschule für Musik Franz Liszt, Weimar from 1967 to 1972. In 1971, he staged as a guest at the Staatsoper Berlin Die Frau ohne Schatten by Richard Strauss.

Kupfer was opera director at the Staatsoper Dresden from 1972 to 1982. In 1973, he staged abroad for the first time: Elektra by Richard Strauss at the Graz Opera. He was from 1977 professor at the Hochschule für Musik Carl Maria von Weber Dresden. In 1978, he was invited to direct Der fliegende Holländer at the Bayreuth Festival, conducted by Dennis Russell Davies. He staged the story in a psychological interpretation as the heroine Senta's imaginations and obsessions.

Kupfer was chief director at the Komische Oper Berlin from 1981, a protégé of Walter Felsenstein. Simultaneously, he was professor at the Hochschule für Musik "Hanns Eisler" in Berlin. At the opera, he staged Mozart operas in the order of their composition, including Die Entführung aus dem Serail in 1982 and Così fan tutte in 1984. He also staged there Wagner's Die Meistersinger von Nürnberg in 1981, Puccini's La Bohème in 1982, Reimann's Lear, Verdi's Rigoletto and Mussorgsky's Boris Godunov in 1983, among many others. He directed there the premiere of Judith by Siegfried Matthus. In 1988, he staged at the Bayreuth Festival Wagner's Der Ring des Nibelungen. The Los Angeles Times called the production "high-tech kitsch ... a bizarre stylistic jumble"; The Guardian remarked on a Götterdämmerung "full of paltry gimmickry"; and The Times commented that "the production gets progressively lazier [and] peters out in the clichés of the day before yesteryear, which Kupfer doubtless thinks the last word in modernity".

Kupfer premiered several operas, including Udo Zimmermann's Levins Mühle at the Staatstheater Dresden in 1973, conducted by Siegfried Kurz. He staged the GDR premiere of Schönberg's Moses und Aron there, also conducted by Kurz in 1975. In 1979, he directed there the world premiere of Zimmermann's Der Schuhu und die fliegende Prinzessin, conducted by Max Pommer, also the premiere of Georg Katzer's Antigone oder die Stadt at the Komische Oper Berlin in 1991, conducted by Jörg-Peter Weigle, the musical Mozart by librettist Michael Kunze and composer Sylvester Levay at the Theater an der Wien in 1999, conducted by Caspar Richter, and in 2000 Reimann's Bernarda Albas Haus, at the Bavarian State Opera, conducted by Zubin Mehta. Kupfer co-wrote the libretto with composer Krzysztof Penderecki of Penderecki's opera Die schwarze Maske. He directed the 1986 world premiere production in Salzburg and the US premiere production at the Santa Fe Opera in 1988.

Kupfer and his wife, the music teacher and soprano Marianne Fischer-Kupfer, had a daughter, Kristiane, who is an actress.

He died on 30 December 2019 in Berlin.

== Style ==
Kupfer worked in the tradition of realistic directing, as developed by Walter Felsenstein and practised especially at the Komische Oper Berlin. The works are interpreted with a focus on implications drawn from them; actions on stage, conflicts and the development of drama are related to the score and to the logic of relationships between the characters. Kupfer always worked individually with the singers, including the choir members, requesting talent for acting and rendering credibility to the actions. Kupfer supported Giorgio Strehler's belief in a "human theatre" ("menschliches Theater"). The characters are, in the tradition of Bertolt Brecht's method of dialectic theatre, always placed in historic political context, which determines their actions at least partly.

== Productions ==
The Akademie der Künste lists several of his productions, including:

- 1958: Dvořák: Rusalka, Halle
- 1971: Richard Strauss: Die Frau ohne Schatten, Staatsoper Berlin, Otmar Suitner
- 1972: Mozart: Die Hochzeit des Figaro, Staatstheater Dresden, Siegfried Kurz
- 1972: Verdi: Otello, Staatsoper Berlin, Wolfgang Rennert
- 1973: Udo Zimmermann: Levins Mühle, premiere, Staatstheater Dresden, Siegfried Kurz
- 1975: Schönberg: Moses und Aron, GDR first performance, Staatstheater Dresden, Siegfried Kurz
- 1975: Wagner: Tristan und Isolde, Staatstheater Dresden, Marek Janowski
- 1975: Berg: Wozzeck, Opernhaus Graz, Gustav Erny
- 1976: Borodin: Prince Igor, Det Kongelige Teater, Wolfgang Rennert
- 1976: Udo Zimmermann: Der Schuhu und die fliegende Prinzessin, premiere, Staatstheater Dresden, Max Pommer
- 1977: Richard Strauss: Elektra, De Nederlandse Opera, Amsterdam, Michael Gielen
- 1978: Wagner: Der fliegende Holländer, Bayreuth Festival, Dennis Russell Davies
- 1979: Berg: Lulu, Oper Frankfurt, Michael Gielen
- 1980: Tchaikovsky: Eugen Onegin, Staatstheater Dresden, Herbert Blomstedt
- 1981: Leoš Janáček: Jenůfa, Oper Köln, Gerd Albrecht
- 1981: Richard Wagner: Die Meistersinger von Nürnberg, Komische Oper Berlin, Rolf Reuter
- 1982 to 1990: Mozart Cycle (1982 Die Entführung aus dem Serail, 1984 Così fan tutte, 1986 Die Zauberflöte, 1986 Die Hochzeit des Figaro, 1987 Don Giovanni, 1990 Idomeneo), Komische Oper Berlin
- 1983: Reimann: Lear, Komische Oper Berlin, Hartmut Haenchen
- 1984: Puccini: La Bohème, Komische Oper Berlin, Volksoper Wien, Ernst Märzendorfer
- 1984: Handel: Giustino, Komische Oper Berlin, Hartmut Haenchen
- 1985: Handel: Belsazar, Hamburgische Staatsoper, Gerd Albrecht
- 1986: Penderecki: Die schwarze Maske, premiere, Salzburg Festival, Woldemar Nelson
- 1987: Bernd Alois Zimmermann: Die Soldaten, Staatstheater Stuttgart, Dennis Russell Davies
- 1988: Wagner: Der Ring des Nibelungen, Bayreuth Festival, Daniel Barenboim
- 1989: Richard Strauss: Elektra, Wiener Staatsoper, Claudio Abbado
- 1989: Tchaikovsky: Die Jungfrau von Orleans, Bavarian State Opera, Gerd Albrecht
- 1991: Georg Katzer: Antigone oder die Stadt, premiere, Komische Oper Berlin, Jörg-Peter Weigle
- 1992: Michael Kunze/Sylvester Levay: Elisabeth, premiere, Theater an der Wien, Caspar Richter
- 1992: Richard Wagner: Parsifal, Staatsoper Berlin, Daniel Barenboim
- 1993: Berlioz: La damnation de Faust, Royal Opera House, Colin Davis
- 1994: Mussorgsky: Khovanshchina, Hamburgische Staatsoper, Gerd Albrecht
- 1995: Wagner: Die Meistersinger von Nürnberg, De Nederlandse Opera Amsterdam, Gerd Albrecht
- 1996: Wagner: Lohengrin, Staatsoper Berlin, Daniel Barenboim
- 1997: Verdi: Macbeth, Bavarian State Opera, Mark Elder
- 1998: Henze: König Hirsch, Komische Oper Berlin, Yakov Kreizberg
- 1999: Michael Kunze/Sylvester Levay: Mozart!, premiere, Theater an der Wien, Caspar Richter
- 2000: Mozart: Titus, Komische Oper Berlin, Yakov Kreizberg
- 2000: Reimann: Bernarda Albas Haus, premiere, Bavarian State Opera, Zubin Mehta
- 2001: Schoeck: Penthesilea, Florence, Gerd Albrecht
- 2002: Britten: The Turn of the Screw, Komische Oper Berlin, Matthias Foremny
- 2003/04: Wagner: Der Ring des Nibelungen, Liceu, Barcelona, Sebastian Weigle
- 2005: Weill: Aufstieg und Fall der Stadt Mahagonny, Semperoper, Sebastian Weigle
- 2009: Pfitzner: Palestrina, Oper Frankfurt, Kirill Petrenko
- 2010: Richard Strauss: Ariadne auf Naxos, Theater an der Wien, Bertrand de Billy
- 2013: Prokofiev: Der Spieler, Oper Frankfurt, Sebastian Weigle
- 2014: Richard Strauss: Der Rosenkavalier, Salzburg Festival, Franz Welser-Möst
- 2014: Wagner: Parsifal, New National Theatre, Tokyo, Taijiro Iimori
- 2015: Glinka: Iwan Sussanin, Oper Frankfurt, Sebastian Weigle
- 2016: Beethoven: Fidelio, Staatsoper Berlin, Daniel Barenboim
- 2016: Shostakovich: Lady Macbeth von Mzensk, Bavarian State Opera, Kirill Petrenko
- 2018: Verdi: Macbeth, Staatsoper Unter den Linden, Daniel Barenboim

== Recordings ==
Among his productions available on DVD are:

- Bernd Alois Zimmermann's Die Soldaten
- Strauss’ Elektra (Vienna State Opera 1989)
- Wagner's Der fliegende Holländer (Bayreuth 1985)
- Wagner's Der Ring des Nibelungen (Bayreuth)
- Wagner's Der Ring des Nibelungen (Gran Teatre del Liceu, Barcelona, 2005)

== Awards ==
Kupfer was a member of the Akademie der Künste in Berlin, the Freie Akademie der Künste in Hamburg, and the Sächsische Akademie der Künste in Dresden. His awards included:

- 1968: Kunstpreis der DDR
- 1983: Nationalpreis der DDR I. Klasse für Kunst und Literatur
- 1985: Deutscher Kritikerpreis
- 1993: Frankfurter Musikpreis
- 1994: Order of Merit of Berlin
- 1994: Berliner Bär
- 2002: Knight Commander's Cross of the Order of Merit of the Federal Republic of Germany
- 2005: Silbernes Blatt of the Dramatiker Union

== Bibliography ==
- Dieter Kranz: Harry Kupfer inszeniert an der Komischen Oper Berlin. Richard Wagner Die Meistersinger von Nürnberg 1981; Wolfgang Amadeus Mozart Die Entführung aus dem Serail, 1982; Giacomo Puccini La Bohème, 1982; Aribert Reimann Lear, 1983; Giuseppe Verdi's Rigoletto, 1983; Modest Mussorgski's Boris Godunov 1983; Wolfgang Amadeus Mozart Così fan tutte 1984 (Theaterarbeit in der DDR 11, Documentation), Berlin 1987.
- Kranz, Dieter (1988). Der Regisseur Harry Kupfer (in German). Berlin: Henschelverlag Kunst und Gesellschaft. ISBN 978-3-362-00291-2.
- Kranz, Dieter (1990). Berliner Theater: 100 Aufführungen aus drei Jahrzehnten (in German). Berlin: Henschel Verlag. ISBN 978-3-362-00434-3.
- Kranz, Dieter (2005). Der Gegenwart auf der Spur (in German). Berlin: Henschel. ISBN 978-3-89487-522-0.
