= Jerzy Artysz =

Polish singer and teacher (1930–2024)

- Jerzy Artysz, c. 2000
- Born: 18 November 1930; Sochaczew, Poland
- Died: 22 July 2024 (aged 93); Warsaw, Poland
- Education: Warsaw Music Academy
- Occupations: Baritone; Academic teacher
- Organizations: Grand Theatre, Łódź; Grand Theatre, Warsaw; Warsaw Music Academy
- Awards: Order of Polonia Restituta; Gloria Artis Medal for Merit to Culture

Jerzy Artysz (18 November 1930 – 22 July 2024) was a Polish baritone, voice teacher, and academic teacher. A long-term member of the Grand Theatre, Warsaw, he made an international career, performing all over Europe, in Israel, Canada and the United States. He performed title roles from Monteverdi's early Baroque L'Orfeo, to Mozart's Don Giovanni, Rossini's Il barbiere di Siviglia, Verdi's Macbeth and Falstaff, Tchaikovsky's Eugene Onegin, Szymanowski's King Roger, Enescu's Œdipe and Alban Berg's Wozzeck. In contemporary opera, he performed in Penderecki's Die schwarze Maske and Menotti's The Telephone; he created roles in the world premieres of Josep Soler's Oedipus et Jocasta at the Liceu in Barcelona in 1986 and of Paweł Mykietyn's Ignorant i szaleniec in Warsaw in 2001. During the 1970s he focused on teaching, both in Barcelona and in Warsaw.

== Life and career ==
Artysz was born in Sochaczew on 18 November 1930. He studied voice with Maria Halfter and violin at the Warsaw Music Academy, graduating in singing in 1959. He continued his studies in Milan with Maria Carbone. He achieved prizes at singing competitions, a third prize at the 6th World Festival of Youth and Students in Moscow in 1957, a second prize and the Grand Prix at the International Singing Competition of Toulouse in 1959, and second prize at the Geneva International Music Competition in 1960. As a student he made his stage debut at the Grand Theatre, Łódź, as Janusz in Moniuszko's Halka directed by Kazimierz Dejmek. He was a member of the company from 1958.

Artysz joined the ensemble of the Grand Theatre in Warsaw in 1964, where he remained for 26 years. He toured the world, performing in Austria, Belgium, Czechoslovakia, France, Germany, Italy, Norway, Portugal, Soviet Union, Sweden, Switzerland, and beyond Europe, including Canada, Israel and the United States. He often participated in festivals such as Warsaw Autumn.

His wide repertoire of leading roles ranged from early Baroque to contemporary. Roles included Monteverdi's Ottone in L'incoronazione di Poppea and the title roles of L'Orfeo, Scarlatti's Narciso, Telemann's Pimpinone, Mozart's Don Giovanni, Rossini's Il barbiere di Siviglia, Verdi's Macbeth and Falstaff, Tchaikovsky's Eugene Onegin, Szymanowski's King Roger, Enescu's Œdipe and Alban Berg's Wozzeck. He also appeared as Posa in Verdi's Don Carlos, in leading Wagner roles, Golaud in Debussy's Pelléas et Mélisande, Perl in Penderecki's Die schwarze Maske and Ben in Menotti's The Telephone. He created the role of Oedipus in the world premiere of Josep Soler's Oedipus et Jocasta at the Liceu in Barcelona in 1986, and the role of the Father in the world premiere of Paweł Mykietyn's chamber opera Ignorant i szaleniec (The Ignorant and the Madman) at the Grand Theatre in 2001.

Artysz was artistic director of the opera studio in Barcelona from 1990 to 1994. He was also professor at the Warsaw Music Academy, participated in oratorio classes in Wrocław, Gdańsk and Bremen, and served as a juror at music competitions. He was awarded the 1980 prize of the Polish composers' association for his merits in contemporary music, and the 1981 Gloria Artis Medal for Merit to Culture. He also became an officer of the Order of Polonia Restituta in 1989. The Chopin University of Music honoured him with a gala concert on the occasion of his 70th birthday, and he performed an aria from L'Orfeo. In 2004 he was presented with the Orpheus Award from the Association of Polish Musicians for his "poignant and highly individual creation" of Paweł Mykietyn's Ładnienie.

Artysz died in Warsaw on 22 July 2024, at the age of 93.
