= Peter Hacks =

German playwright, author, and essayist

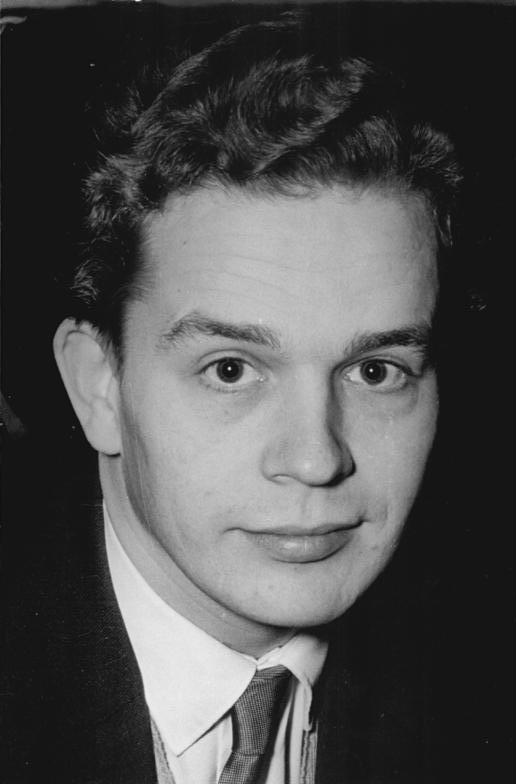
Peter Hacks in 1956.

Peter Hacks (21 March 1928 – 28 August 2003) was a German playwright, author, and essayist.

Hacks was born in Breslau (Wrocław), Lower Silesia. Displaced by World War II, Hacks settled in Munich in 1947, where he made acquaintance with Thomas Mann and Bertolt Brecht. Hacks then followed Brecht to East Berlin in 1955. However, a continued cooperation between him and Brecht did not arise. From 1960 Hacks worked as a dramaturge at the Deutsches Theater (DT) in Berlin.

When the staging of his play Die Sorgen und die Macht (1962) sparked criticism from officials, he gave up his position as a dramaturge at the DT and lived again as a freelance writer. His success on the world stage – most notably with Ein Gespräch im Hause Stein über den abwesenden Herrn von Goethe (English title: Charlotte) – led to his literary acceptance within GDR and West-Germany.

Hacks was a communist and supported the East German government's 1976 expatriation of the singer Wolf Biermann. His correspondence with the communist historian Kurt Gossweiler has been published.

He won the Alex Wedding Prize (1992) and the Deutscher Jugendliteraturpreis (1998).

Hacks died in Groß Machnow.

Together with his wife Hacks used the pseudonym Saul O’Hara through which they could write and publish boulevard comedies (Risky Marriage).

== Publications ==
- With Kurt Gossweiler, in: Am Ende verstehen sie es: Politische Schriften 1988–2003. (Edited by André Thiele.) Berlin: Eulenspiegel, 2005. ISBN 978-3-359-01626-7
- Der Schuhu und die fliegende Prinzessin, fairy-tale, base for an opera by Udo Zimmermann
