= Bayreuth Festspielhaus =

Opera house in Bayreuth, Germany

Richard Wagner Festspielhaus
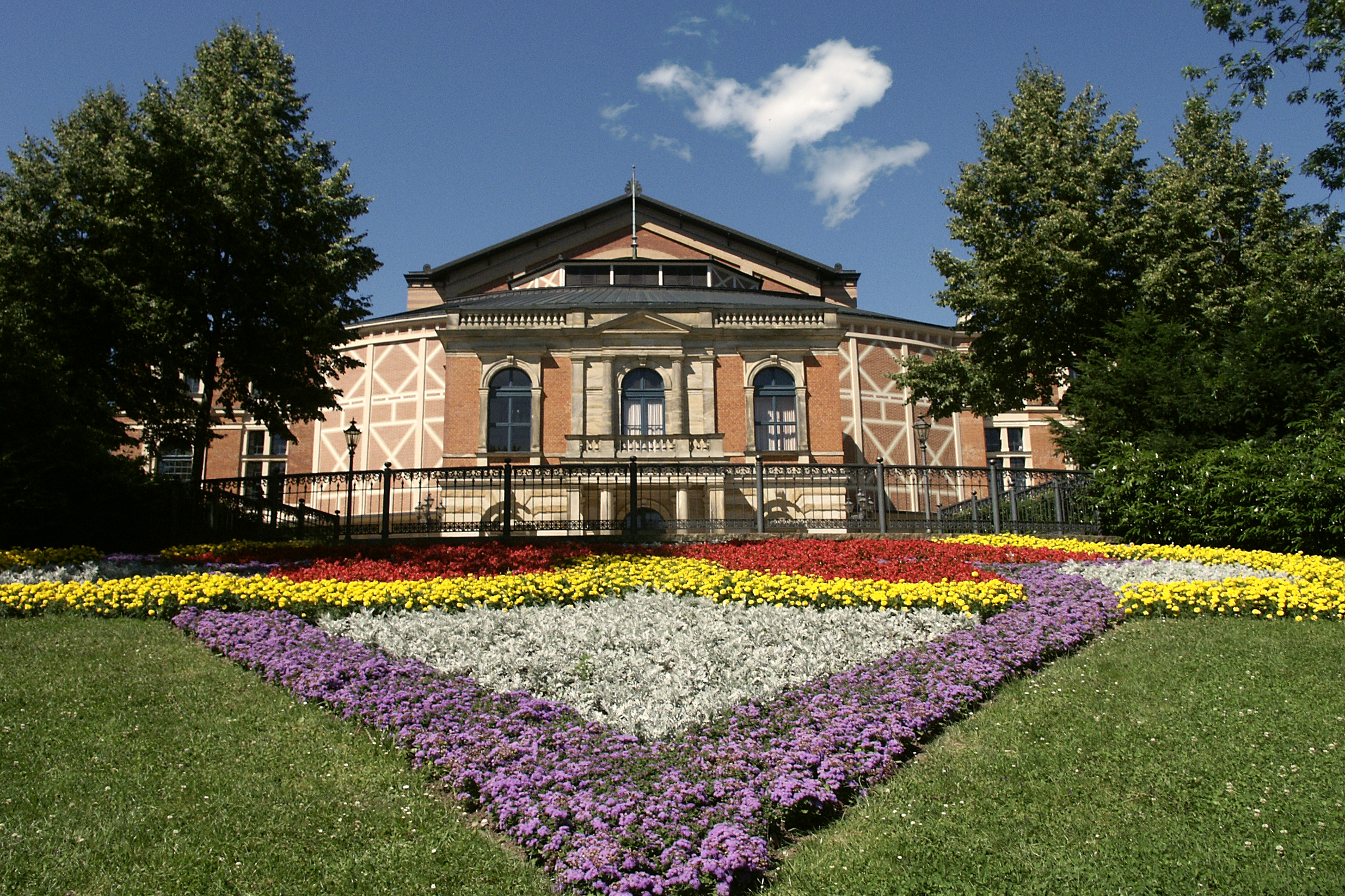
- The Festspielhaus, home of the Bayreuth Festival, in 2006

General information
- Location: Bayreuth, Bavaria, Germany
- Coordinates: 49°57′36″N 11°34′47″E
- Groundbreaking: 1872
- Opened: 1876

Design and construction
- Architect: after Gottfried Semper

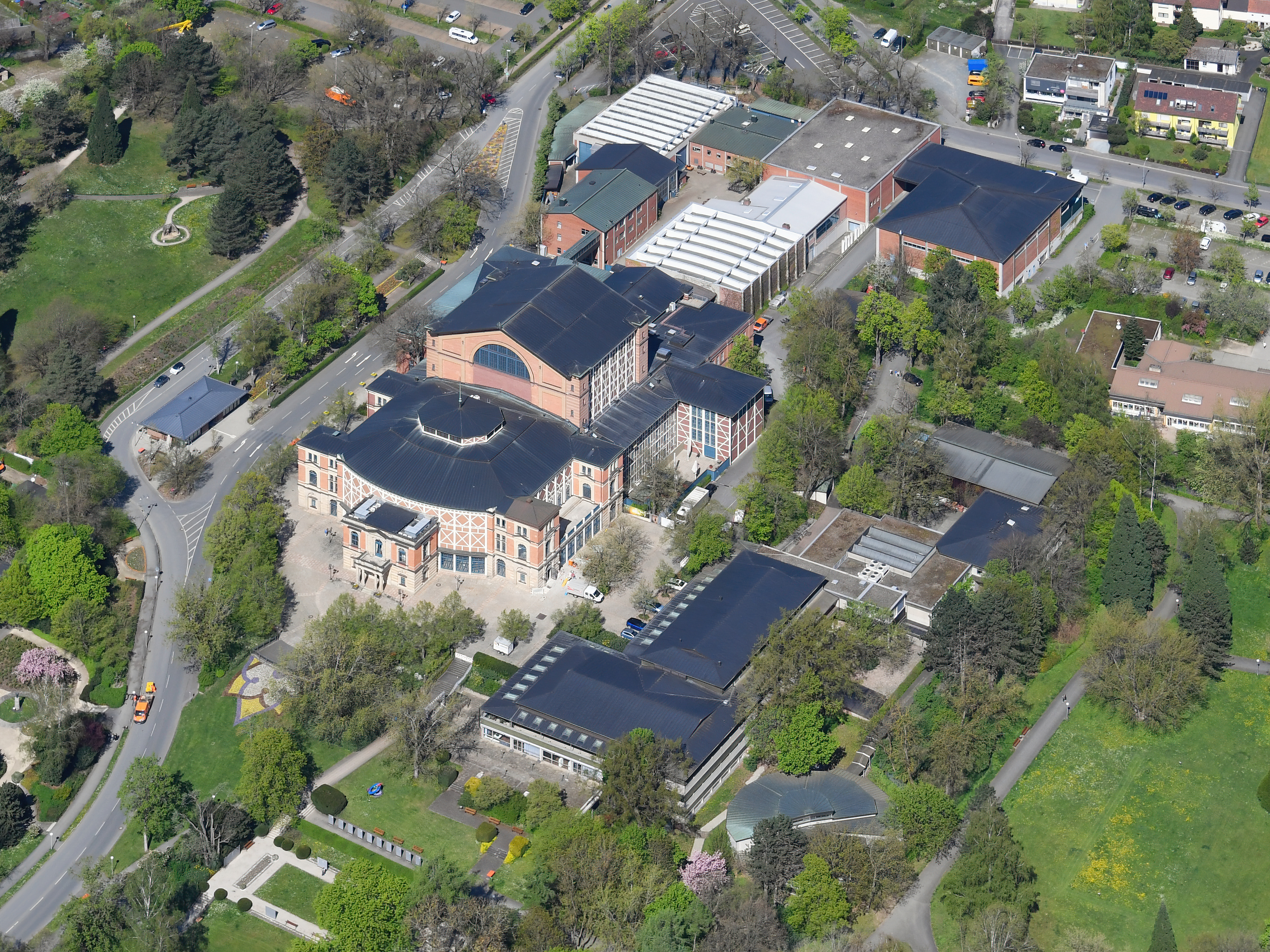
Aerial view of the Bayreuth Festspielhaus

The Bayreuth Festspielhaus or Bayreuth Festival Theatre (German: Bayreuther Festspielhaus, pronounced [baɪˈʁɔʏtɐ ˈfɛstʃpiːlˌhaʊs]) is an opera house north of Bayreuth, Germany, built by the 19th-century German composer Richard Wagner and dedicated solely to the performance of his stage works. It is the venue for the annual Bayreuth Festival, for which it was specifically conceived and built. Its official name is Richard-Wagner-Festspielhaus. It is the home of the Bayreuth Festival Orchestra.

== Design ==
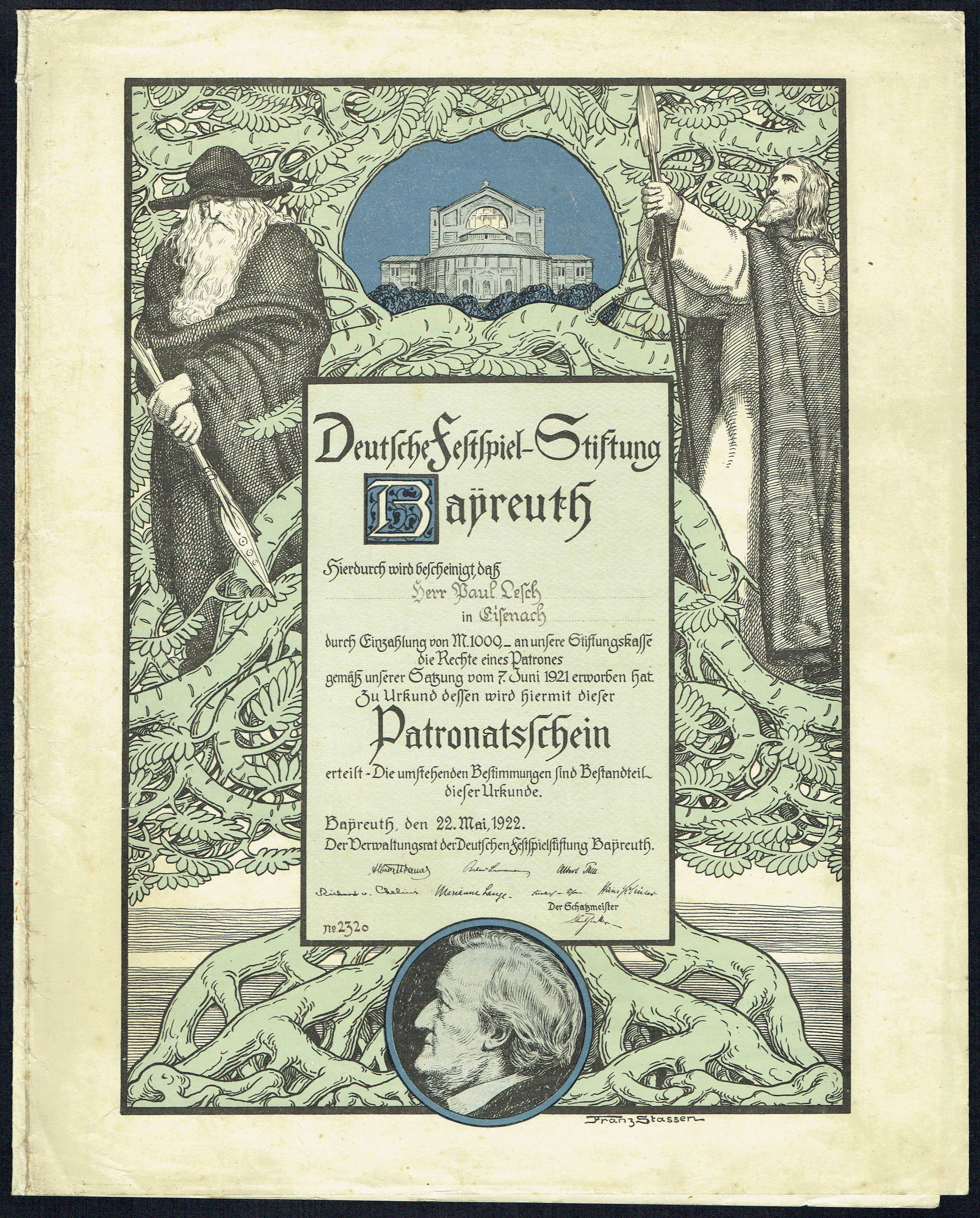
Patronage certificate for funding the Bayreuth festival, issued 22nd May 1922

Wagner adapted the design of the Festspielhaus from an unrealised project by Gottfried Semper for an opera house in Munich without his permission and, together with the architect Otto Brückwald, supervised its construction. Ludwig II of Bavaria provided the primary funding for the work. The foundation stone was laid on 22 May 1872, Wagner's 59th birthday. The building was first opened for the premiere of the complete four-opera cycle of Der Ring des Nibelungen (The Ring of the Nibelung), from 13 to 17 August 1876.

Only the entry façade exhibits the typical late-19th-century ornamentation, while the remainder of the exterior is modest and shows mostly undecorated bricks. The interior is mainly wood and has a reverberation time of 1.55 seconds. The Festspielhaus is one of the largest free-standing timber structures ever erected. Unlike the traditional opera house design with several tiers of seating in a horseshoe shaped auditorium, the Festspielhaus's seats are arranged in a single steeply-shaped wedge, with galleries or boxes along the back wall only. This is also known as continental seating. Many contemporary movie theaters have adopted this style of seating, which gives every seat an equal and uninterrupted view of the stage. The capacity of the Festspielhaus is 1,925 and it has a volume of 10,000 cubic metres.

The Festspielhaus features a double proscenium, which gives the audience the illusion that the stage is further away than it actually is. The double proscenium and the recessed orchestra pit create – in Wagner's term – a "mystic gulf" between the audience and the stage. This gives a dreamlike character to performances, and provides a physical reinforcement of the mythic content of most of Wagner's operas. The architecture of Festpielhaus accomplished many of Wagner's goals and ideals for the performances of his operas including an improvement on the sound, feel, and overall look of the production.

The Festpielhaus was originally planned to open in 1873, but by that time Wagner had barely raised enough money to put up the walls of his theatre. He began to raise money by traveling and putting on concerts in various cities and countries throughout Europe. There are, however, some documents concerning the donation and aid (900 thaler) to Wagner for that matter by the Sultan Abdülaziz of the Ottoman Empire. Even after Ludwig began funding the project, Wagner had to continue putting on concerts to keep the building project financially afloat. The tours were very taxing on Wagner's health and would eventually be a key element to his death later on in 1883.

== Orchestra pit ==
A significant feature of the Festspielhaus is its unusual orchestra pit. It is recessed under the stage and covered by a hood, so that the orchestra is completely invisible to the audience. This feature was a central preoccupation for Wagner, since it made the audience concentrate on the drama onstage, rather than the distracting motion of the conductor and musicians. The design also corrected the balance of volume between singers and orchestra, creating ideal acoustics for Wagner's operas, which are the only operas performed at the Festspielhaus. However, this arrangement has also made it the most challenging to conduct in, even for the world's best conductors. Not only is the crowded pit enveloped in darkness, but the acoustic reverberation makes it difficult to synchronise the orchestra with the singers. Conductors must therefore retrain themselves to ignore cues from singers.

The orchestra layout deployed at Bayreuth is unusual in three ways:

1. The first violins are positioned on the right-hand side of the conductor instead of their usual place on the left side. This is in all likelihood because of the way the sound is intended to be directed towards the stage rather than directly on the audience. This way the sound has a more direct line from the first violins to the back of the stage where it can be then reflected to the audience.
2. Double basses, cellos and harps (when more than one used, e.g. Ring) are split into groups and placed on either side of the pit.
3. The rest of the orchestra is located directly under the stage. This makes communication with the conductor vital as most of the players are unable to see or hear the singers, but creates the huge, rich sounds Wagner sought to compose.

== Bayreuth Festival ==
The Festspielhaus remains the venue of the annual Bayreuth Festival, during which Wagner's later operas, such as the Ring cycle and Parsifal, are given on a repertory basis.

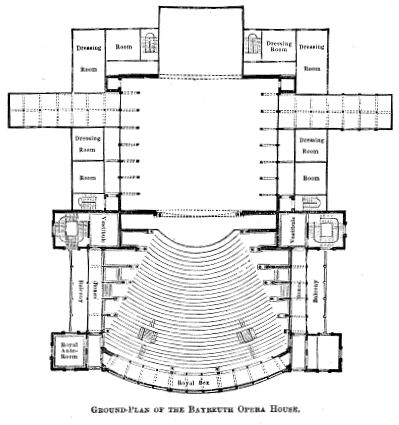
Floor Plan

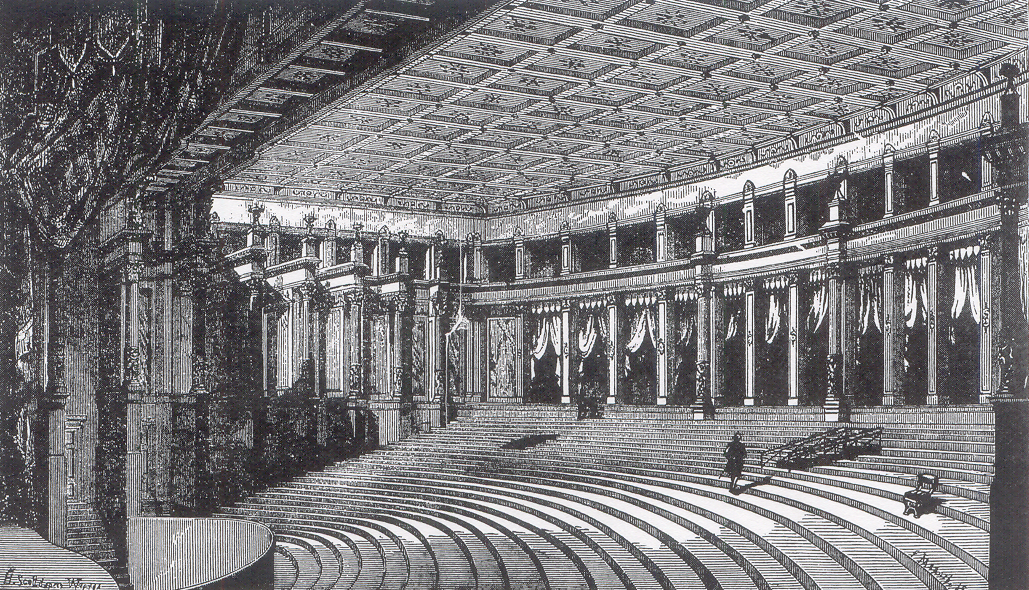
Auditorium (1876)

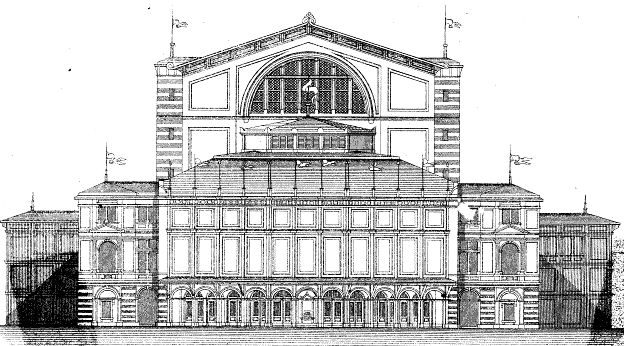
Bayreuth Festspielhaus, earlier design

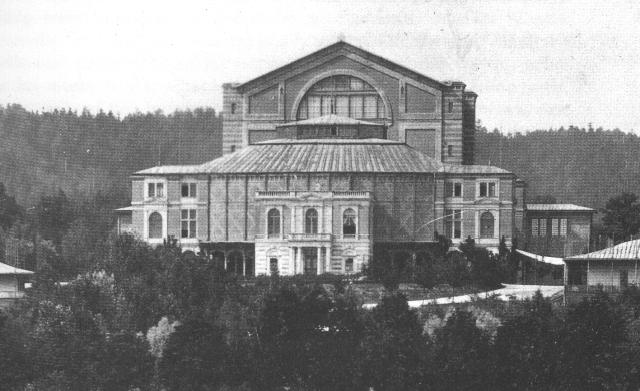
Building (1882)

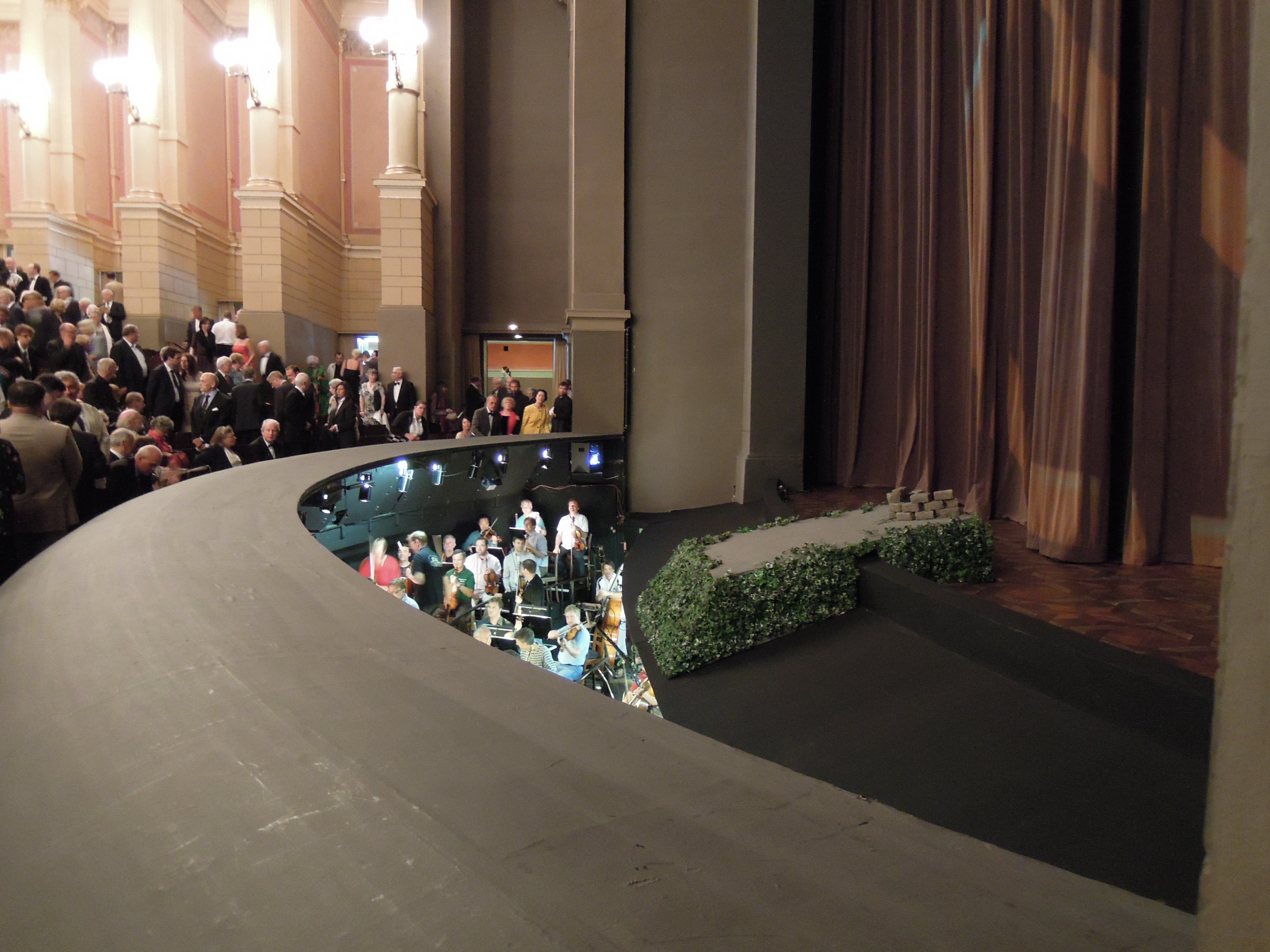
Part of the orchestra pit

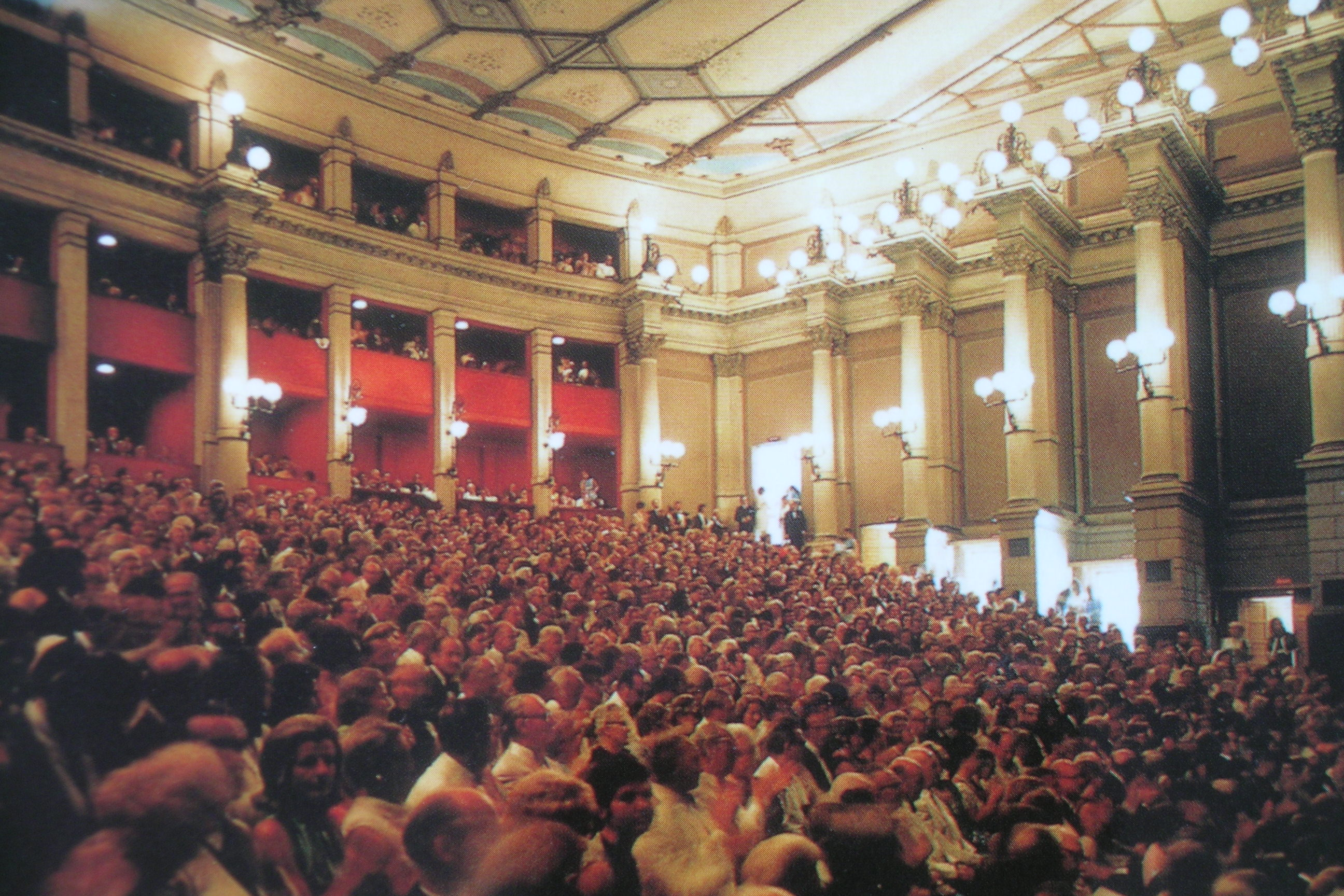
Auditorium (c. 1970)

== Recent history ==
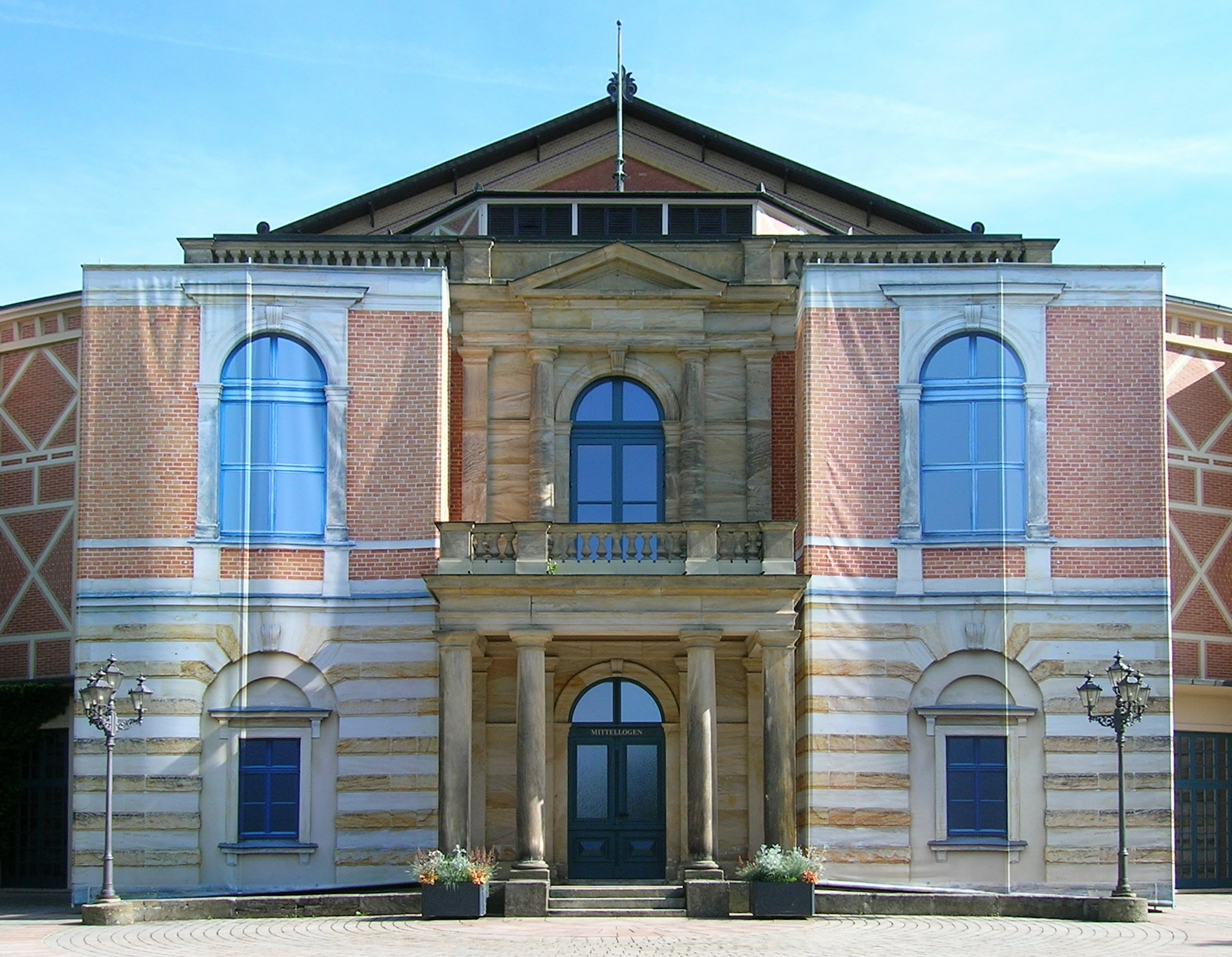
In 2014, photos printed on canvas hide the scaffolding around the Festspielhaus.

In early 2012, Katharina Wagner mentioned the need for repairs to the building, with mention specifically of roof leaks and crumbling of the red brick facade. In 2014, funding for restoration was announced at a level of approximately €30 million, primarily from public funding shared between Germany and the state of Bavaria, with the German national government and the Bavarian state government holding majority shares.

Repairs were completed on 26 July 2015 and the building is fully restored.

== See also ==
- List of opera festivals
- List of Bayreuth Festival productions of Der Ring des Nibelungen
