= Johannes Paul Thilman =

German composer

Johannes Paul Thilman (11 January 1906 – 29 January 1973) was a German composer.

== Life ==
Thilman, who actually wanted to become a teacher, encountered music at the age of 18 and taught himself initially. After a private lesson with Paul Hindemith and Hermann Scherchen, he attended the Leipzig Conservatory in 1929 and studied composition with Hermann Grabner. The first performances of his works took place after he finished his studies in 1931. They were performed in Donaueschingen by his teacher, Hindemith. In the year 1940, he became the instructor of composition at the "Carl Maria von Weber" School of Music in his hometown, Dresden. He was a professor there from the year 1956 until he became an Emeritus professor in 1968. Among his students were composers Friedrich Goldmann and Udo Zimmermann. Besides his academic activities, he was also involved in the music life of Dresden. In 1960, Thilman coveted the National Prize of East Germany.

== Style ==
Thilman was a conservative Composer. His music is tonal and refers to the form and harmony of Romantic music. His melody is always catchy and uncomplicated. Thilman was particularly inspired by folk music. This influence can be heard clearly in many of his works. Most of his works are kept short. Generally, his tone is fresh and uncomplicated rather than dramatic. Undoubtedly, Thilman oriented his works towards the aesthetics of the Socialist realism. In his later works, he often chose unusual settings and freer forms for his works. Thilman was very respected in East Germany. His Symphony no. 4 was particularly popular. Today, however, he is mostly forgotten.

== Selected compositions ==
Stage

- Peter Schlemihl, Ballet (1965)

Orchestral

- Kleine Sinfonie Nr.1 (Little Symphony No.1) in G major, Op.56 no.2 (1951)
- Kleine Sinfonie Nr.2 (Little Symphony No.2) in F major, op.60 or 61 (1952)
- Kleine Sinfonie Nr.3 (Little Symphony No.3) in D major, op.63 (1953)
- Symphony No.4 in D minor, op.64 (1954)
- Symphony No.5 "Sinfonie in einem Satz" (Symphony in One Movement), op.79 (1956)
- Symphony No.6 in E major op.92 (1959)
- Symphony No.7 in A major op.101 (1962)
- Partita piccola for chamber orchestra, op.43 (1948)
- Sinfonische Inventionen (Symphonic Inventions), op.77 (1955)
- Sinfonische Prolog (Symphonic Prologue), op.94 (1960)
- Music for Strings (1960)
- Sinfonisches Vorspiel (Symphonic Prelude), op.100 (1961)
- Episoden (Episodes) (1967)
- Ode (1966–1968)
- Impulse (1971)

Concertante

- Concerto for piano and chamber orchestra (1928)
- Concertino giocoso for trombone and orchestra, op.47 (1949)
- Concerto for violin and orchestra, op.59 (1952)
- Concertino for piano (left hand) and orchestra, op.65 (1954)
- Concertino for trumpet and chamber orchestra, op.66 (1954)
- Lichtenberger Konzert for violin and string orchestra (1958)
- Concerto piccolo for harpsichord and small orchestra (or piano and chamber orchestra) (1968)
- Double Concerto for bass clarinet and piano with string orchestra and percussion (1968)
- Concerto for 2 pianos and orchestra (1968)
- Orpheus, Concerto for English horn and small orchestra (1969)
- Concerto for violin and chamber orchestra (1972)

Chamber

- Das kleine Requiem for English horn, alto saxophone, viola and piano, op.27
- Sonata in C♯ minor for viola and piano (1935)
- Kleine Sonate (Little Sonata) for English horn and piano, op.34 (1946)
- Sonatine for string quartet, op.49
- Sonata No.1 for violin and piano, op.50
- String Quartet No.1
- String Quartet No.2, op.62 (1954)
- Piano Quartet No.2, op.70
- Quintet for clarinet and strings, op.73 (1955)
- Sextet for woodwinds and strings, op.74 (1955)
- Piano Quintet (1955)
- Sonata No.2 for violin and piano, op.80
- String Quartet No.3 in D major, op.81
- String Quartet No.4 "in einem Satz" (in One Movement), op.84 (1958)
- Trio Piccolo for alto flute, bass clarinet and viola, op.90
- Kleine Sonate (Little Sonata) for cello and piano, op.96 (1960)
- Piano Trio (1963)
- 4 Gespräche for flute, bass clarinet and piano (1965)
- Concerti espressivi for trombone, timpani and piano (1965)
- Dramatische Szenen for string quartet (1969)
- Kammerspiel for string quartet (1970)
- String Quartet No.5 (1970)
- Concertino for string quartet (1971)
- Aspekte for flute, viola and harp
- 6 Duets for violin and viola (pub Litolff 1964)

Piano

- 2 Sonatas (d minor, f minor), op.30 (1946)
- Sonatina patetica, op.39 (1947)
- Händel-Variations, op.1 (1934)
- 10 Neue Inventionen (10 New Inventions), op.86 (1958)
- Sommerabend am Schwarzen Meer (1970)
- 5 Inventions for four hands piano (1949)

Vocal

- Das deutsche Tagewerk, Cantata
- Dresdner Kantate
- Unsterbliche Opfer for bass and orchestra (1960)

== Writings (selection) ==
- Probleme der neuen Polyphonie. Dresden: Dresdener Verl.-Ges. [1949] (full text via the Munich Digitization Center).
- Neue Musik. Polemische Beiträge. [Dresden]: VVB Verlag – Dresdner Verlag 1950.
- Musikalische Formenlehre in unsrer Zeit. Dresden: Verlag der Kunst 1951.
