= Weiße Rose (opera) =

- Opera by Udo Zimmermann
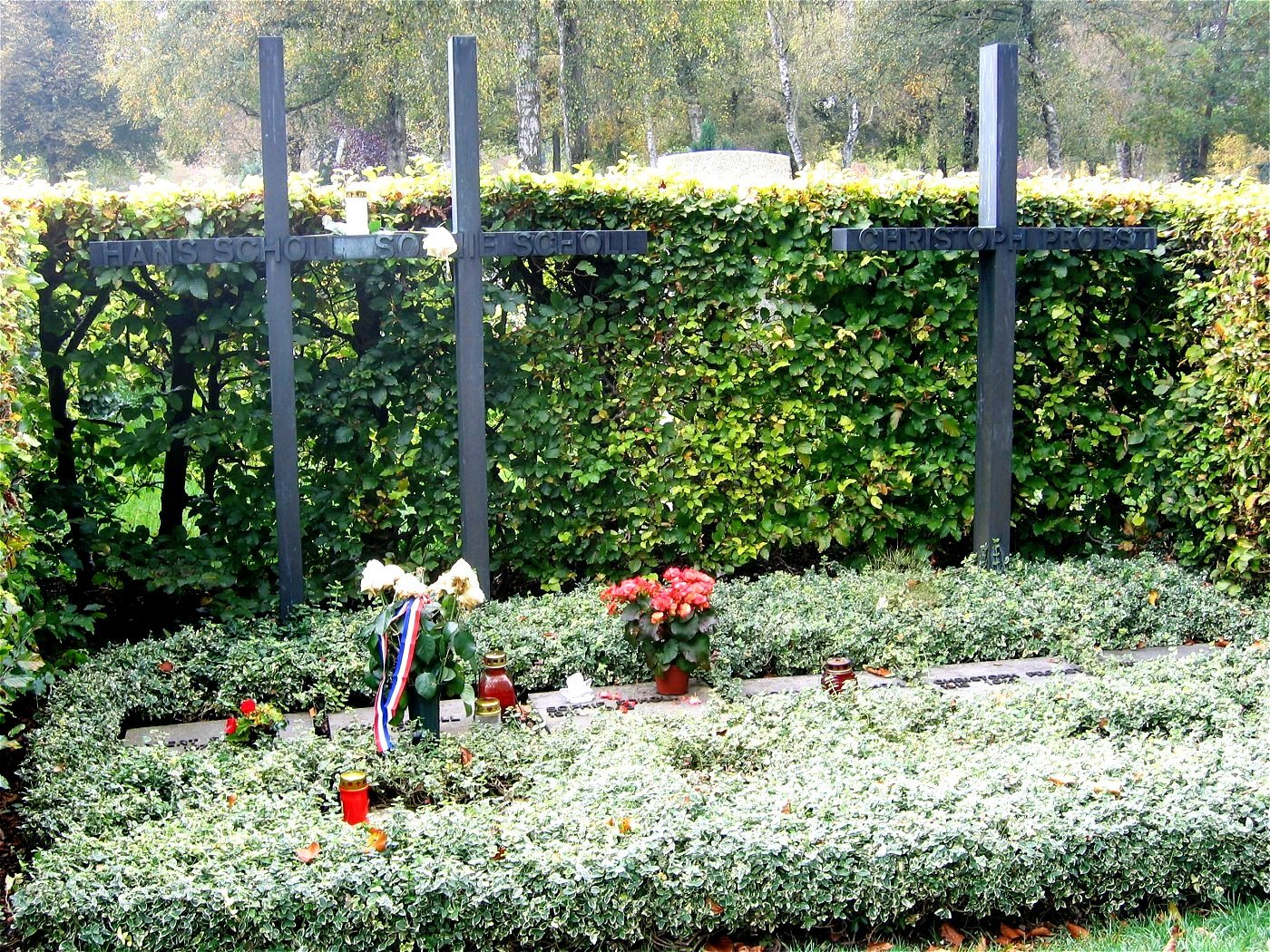
- Grave of Hans Scholl, Sophie Scholl, and Christoph Probst
- Librettist: Ingo Zimmermann
- Language: German
- Based on: non-violent resistance group Die Weiße Rose
- Premiere: 17 June 1967; Dresden Conservatory

Weiße Rose (White Rose) (Note: The title of the opera is often shown as Die Weiße Rose; however, the publisher, Breitkopf & Härtel, shows both versions as Weiße Rose.) is a chamber opera in one act by Udo Zimmermann. The opera tells the story of Hans and Sophie Scholl, a brother and sister in their early twenties, who were guillotined by the Nazis in 1943 for leading Die Weiße Rose, a non-violent resistance group. The opera premiered at the Dresden Conservatory on 17 June 1967 with a German libretto by the composer's brother, Ingo Zimmermann, a well known journalist and writer in Germany. The opera was received fairly well. Zimmermann revised it the following year for a professional production in Schwerin.

A completely new and less conventionally narrative opera with the same title and a libretto by Wolfgang Willaschek was premiered at the Hamburg State Opera on 27 February 1986 and was a success with both audience and critics. The opera became an international success and has had performances at many of the world's leading opera houses and with leading orchestras including the Vienna State Opera, Komische Oper Berlin, Zurich Opera, the Salzburg Festival, and the Israel Philharmonic Orchestra among many others. The United States premiere of the opera was presented by Opera Omaha in 1988 with soprano Lauren Flanigan as Sophie.

== Roles ==
| Cast | Voice type | Premiere of second opera, 27 February 1986 Conductor: Udo Zimmermann |
|---|---|---|
| Hans Scholl | tenor (Note: The tessitura and range of the role of Hans is such that a number of baritones with good upper extension have also performed the role.) | Lutz-Michael Harder |
| Sophie Scholl | soprano | Gabriele Fontana |

== Recordings ==
- Die weiße Rose with Udo Zimmermann (conductor), Gabriele Fontana (Sophie), Lutz-Michael Harder (Hans) and the Instrumentalensemble München. Released on the Orfeo label in 1988. Cat: 162871
- Weiße Rose with Udo Zimmermann (conductor), Grazyna Szklarecka (Sophie), Frank Schiller (Hans), Musica Viva Chamber Orchestra, Berlin Classics, 2005.

== Sources ==
- F. Hennenberg: Udo Zimmermann: Leidenschaft Musik – Abenteuer Theater: Komponist – Intendant – Dirigent (Bonn, 1992)
- M. Ernst, ed.: Udo Zimmermann: ein Fünfzigjähriger im Spiegelbild von Zeitgenossen: eine Biographie in Zitaten (Leipzig, 1993)
- Lars Klingberg. "Zimmermann, Udo." Grove Music Online. (subscription access)
