= Margaret Harshaw =

American opera singer (1909–1997)

- Born: May 12, 1909; Philadelphia, Pennsylvania, U.S.
- Died: November 7, 1997 (aged 88); Libertyville, Illinois, U.S.
- Resting place: Lake Forest Cemetery
- Occupations: Opera singer; Teacher

Margaret Harshaw (May 12, 1909 – November 7, 1997) was an American opera singer and voice teacher who sang for 22 consecutive seasons at the Metropolitan Opera from November 1942 to March 1964. She began her career as a mezzo-soprano in the early 1930s but then began performing roles from the soprano repertoire in 1950. She sang a total of 39 roles in 25 works at the Met and was heard in 40 of the Metropolitan Opera radio broadcasts. She was also active as a guest artist with major opera houses in Europe and North and South America.

Harshaw possessed a wide vocal range, was a convincing actress, and was particularly regarded for her portrayals of Wagnerian heroines. She has the distinction of portraying more Wagner roles on the stage of the Metropolitan Opera - altogether 14 - than any other singer in history. After retiring from the stage, she became a highly regarded singing teacher, serving on the voice faculties of the Curtis Institute of Music and the Jacobs School of Music at Indiana University, and she taught Young Artists' Programs at Santa Fe Opera (Santa Fe New Mexico) and at Lyric Opera of Chicago.

== Early life and education ==
Harshaw was born in Philadelphia, Pennsylvania, to a family of Scottish and English descent, Harshaw had her earliest musical experiences singing in church choirs as a child. She often performed duets with her sister Miriam as well but never seriously contemplated a vocal career during her youth. After graduating from high school, she worked for a telephone company.

From 1928 to 1932, she was a member of the alto section of the Mendelssohn Club, a historic choir which at that time performed often with the Philadelphia Orchestra under conductor Leopold Stokowski. She proceeded to win a series of vocal competitions in the early 1930s which led to performances in Philadelphia and Washington D.C.

== Career ==
Harshaw featured in Children Opera News in March 1955

Harshaw made her professional opera debut with the Philadelphia Operatic Society as Azucena in Giuseppe Verdi's Il trovatore on April 30, 1934. That same year she sang the Voice of the Mother of Antonia in The Tales of Hoffmann and the shepherd boy in Tosca with the Philadelphia Orchestra under conductor Alexander Smallens. She performed in a few more operas with the orchestra the following year, singing Giovanna in Rigoletto, Mamma Lucia in Cavalleria rusticana, and Katisha in The Mikado. She also portrayed Dame Hannah in Gilbert & Sullivan's Ruddigore with The Savoy Company on May 10, 1935, at the Academy of Music.

In 1935, Harshaw won the National Federation of Music Clubs singing competition which gave her a $1,000 cash prize and led to her New York City concert debut on July 21 of that year at Lewisohn Stadium under conductor José Iturbi. Later that summer she appeared in several operas with the Steel Pier Opera Company in Atlantic City. In 1936 she entered the graduate program at the Juilliard School where she studied voice with Anna Eugénie Schoen-René who had been taught by the legendary Pauline Viardot, daughter of the Spanish singer and pedagogue Manuel García. While there she sang the role of Dido in a 1939 student production of Henry Purcell's Dido and Aeneas. Walter Damrosch attended the performance and approached her afterwards, saying "My child, one day you will be Brünnhilde". In 1940 she sang in productions of The Bartered Bride, Carmen, The Devil and Daniel Webster (opera), Le donne curiose, Faust, and The Gondoliers at the Chautauqua Opera. She also appeared frequently at the Worcester Music Festival during the early 1940s.

In 1942, Harshaw won the Metropolitan Opera's "Auditions of the Air" (precursor to the National Council Auditions) which led to her début at that house as the Second Norn in Richard Wagner's Götterdämmerung on November 25, 1942, under the baton of Erich Leinsdorf. Over the next nine seasons she sang several other mezzo-soprano roles at the Met, largely in operas by Wagner and Verdi. Her Wagner roles during these years included Brangäne in Tristan und Isolde, Erda, Flosshilde, and Fricka in Das Rheingold, Erda in Siegfried, the First Norn and Waltraute in Götterdämmerung, Fricka and Schwertleite in Die Walküre, Magdalene in Die Meistersinger von Nürnberg, Mary in The Flying Dutchman, Ortrud in Lohengrin, Venus in Tannhäuser, and Kundry and the Voice from Above in Parsifal. Other roles in her Met repertoire included Amelfa in Le Coq d'Or, Auntie in Peter Grimes, Azucena, Amneris in Aida, Frugola in Il Tabarro, Geneviève in Pelléas et Mélisande, Gertrud in Hänsel und Gretel, Herodias in Salome, La Cieca in La Gioconda, Mistress Quickly in Falstaff, the Mother in Louise, the Third Lady in The Magic Flute, and Ulrica in Un Ballo in Maschera.

Harshaw made her first foray into the soprano repertoire singing the role of Senta in The Flying Dutchman opposite Paul Schöffler in the title role on November 22, 1950. By 1954 she had completely left the mezzo repertoire, with the exception of Ortrud, and effectively succeeded Helen Traubel in the Wagnerian heroine roles of Brünnhilde, Elisabeth, Isolde, Kundry, and Sieglinde. Her only non-Wagnerian role during her soprano years at the Met was Donna Anna in Wolfgang Amadeus Mozart's Don Giovanni. She remained with the Metropolitan until the close of the 1963–1964 season. Her final and 375th performance at the Met was as Ortrud on March 10, 1964, with Jess Thomas as Lohengrin, Leonie Rysanek as Elsa, and Joseph Rosenstock conducting.

During her many years at the Met, Harshaw was also active as a guest artist with opera houses throughout North America and Europe. She was committed to the San Francisco Opera between 1944 and 1947, portraying such parts as Amneris, Azucena, Brangäne, Fricka, Geneviève, Herodias, La Cieca, Mistress Quickly, Ortrud, Ulrica, and the Nurse in Boris Godunov. In 1948 she sang at the Opéra National de Paris as Amneris, Brangäne, and Dalila in Samson et Dalila, and in the National Opera in Havana, Cuba, as Brangane, with Kirsten Flagstad. In 1950 she made her first appearance with the Philadelphia Civic Grand Opera Company as Amneris, returning there in 1952 to sing Isolde. She was engaged at the Royal Opera, London from 1953 to 1956 and again in 1960, where she excelled as Brünnhilde in Rudolf Kempe's Ring Cycles. In 1954 she sang Donna Anna at the Glyndebourne Festival. In 1961 she made her debut with the Philadelphia Lyric Opera Company as Ortrud. She portrayed the title heroine in Giacomo Puccini's Turandot at the 1964 New York World's Fair. She also sang with opera companies in Cincinnati, New Orleans, San Antonio, Pittsburgh, Houston, Mexico, and Venezuela. She made several Latin American tours and was a soloist with many of the major American orchestras. Other roles in her repertoire included the Leonore in Fidelio, and the title role in Alceste.

In 1962, Harshaw joined the voice faculty at Indiana University, where she taught until 1993, becoming a Distinguished Professor of Voice. In 1989, she was awarded an honorary Doctorate of Music from Westminster Choir College. For the Indiana University Opera Theater, Harshaw sang two performances of Puccini's Turandot on July 29 and August 8, 1964. She sang Kundry in four performances of Wagner's Parsifal on March 15, 1964, March 19 and March 22, 1967, and March 31, 1968. Her final operatic performance anywhere was at Indiana University on March 22, 1970, as Brünnhilde in Wagner's Die Walküre.

She served on the faculty at the Curtis Institute of Music from 1970 to 1976, when the then opera department for which she primarily taught there was dissolved.

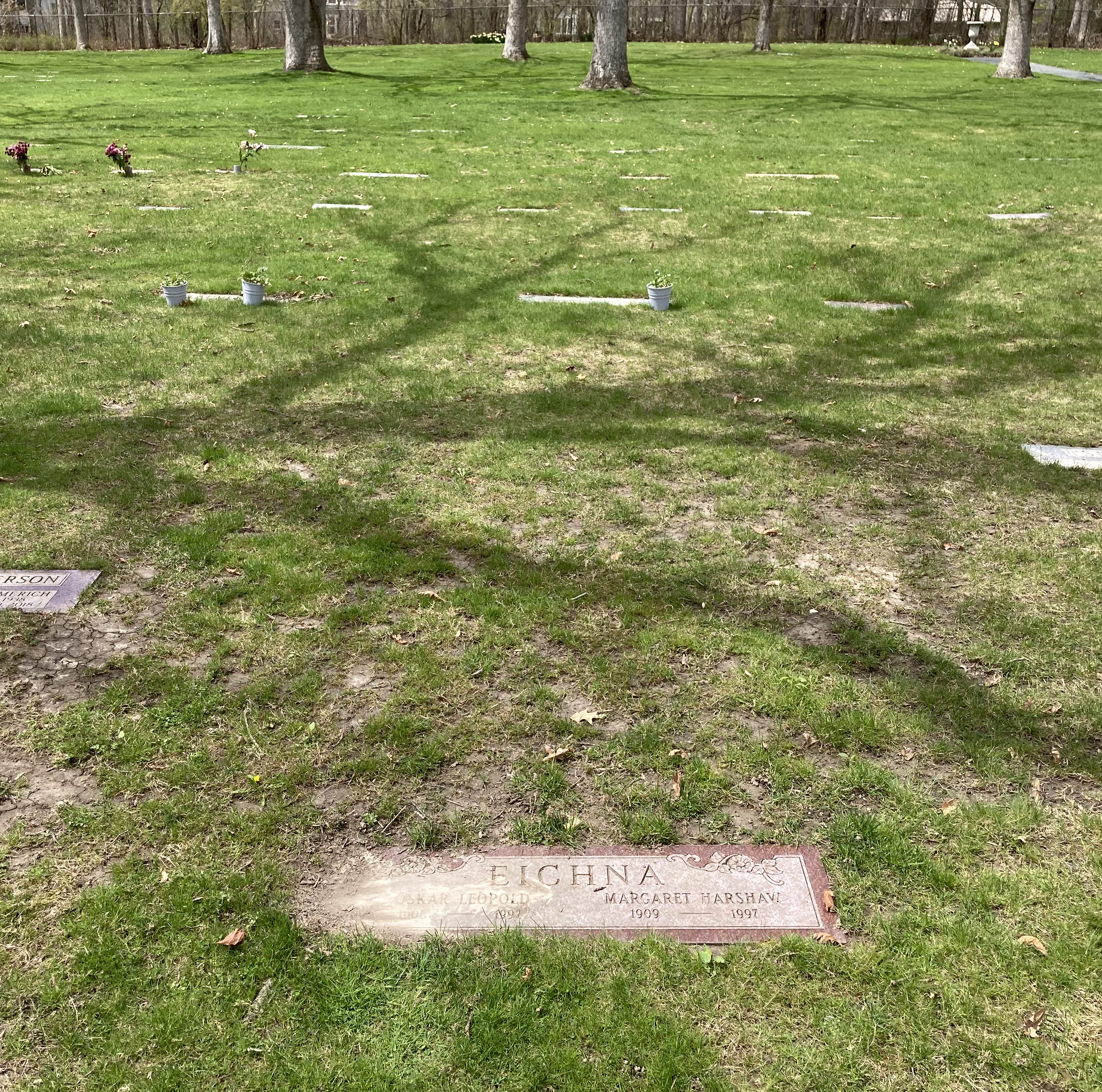
Harshaw's grave at Lake Forest Cemetery

After her retirement from Indiana University, Harshaw moved to Lake Forest, Illinois, where she taught privately until her death. Among her many students were Nancy Adams, Laura Aikin, Norman Andersson, David Arnold, Bruce Baumer, Richard Best, Daniel Brewer, Gary Burgess, William Burden, Elizabeth Byrne, Elizabeth Canis, Alan Cemore, Katherine Ciesinski, Catherine Clark, Shirley Close, Alexandra Coku, Vinson Cole, Rebecca Cook-Carter, Jeffrey Dowd, Jane Dutton, Kathryn Bouleyn Day, Pablo Elvira, Elem Eley, Brent Ellis, Julia Faulkner, Thomas Faracco, Constance Fee, Joseph Frank, Colenton Freeman, Alberto Garcia, Franz Grundheber, George Hesse, Cynthia Hoffmann, Jeannette Junk, Caroline Murdock Kheele, Elisabeth Kiser, David Langan, Kevin Langan, Evelyn Lear, Shirley Love, Mark Lundberg, Joseph McClain, Robert McFarland, Nancy Maultsby, Emily Magee, Carolyn Marlow, Mark McCrory, Rodney Miller, Elias Mokole, Stephen Morsheck, Harry Musselwhite, Ronald Naldi, Gayletha Nichols, Jan Opalach, Paula Page, Larry Paxton, Ron Peo, Reginald Pittman, Walter Plant, Matthew Polenzani, Alicia Purcell, Ashley Putnam, John Reardon, Laura Brooks-Rice, Michael Rocchio, Gianna Rolandi, Randall Reid-Smith, Nadine Secunde, Christopher Schaldenbrand, Jane Shaulis, Scharmal Schrock, Martha Sheil, Glenn Siebert, Philip Skinner, David Smalley, Alma Jean Smith, James Allen "Jimmy" Smith Jr., Gregory Stapp, Teresa Stratas, Sharon Sweet, Michael Sylvester, Randal Turner, Rebecca Turner, Benita Valente, Carol Vaness, Anastasios Vrenios, Felicia Weathers, Christine Weidinger, Stephen West, Sally Wolf, and Meredith Zara.

== Personal life ==
She was married to Oskar Eichna, who died on September 23, 1992. They had one son, Oskar L. Eichna Jr. (died May 22, 2003), and a daughter Margaret Eichna (married name Baier – deceased September 10, 1993).

== Death ==
Harshaw died on November 7, 1997, at the age of 88 in Libertyville, Illinois. She was buried at Lake Forest Cemetery.
