= Der Schuhu und die fliegende Prinzessin =

1976 opera by Udo Zimmermann

- Fairy-tale opera by Udo Zimmermann
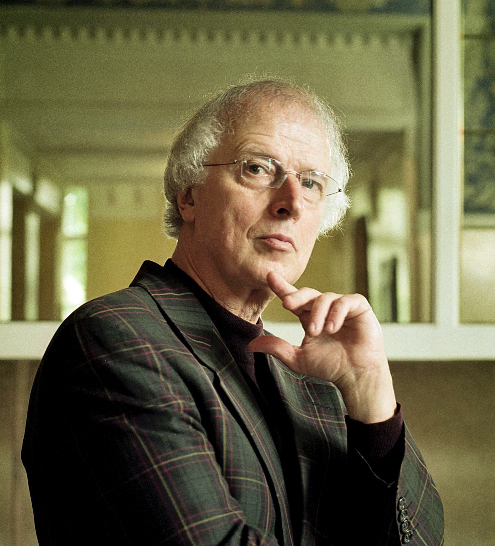
- The composer in 2006
- Translation: The Bird-Man and the Flying Princess
- Librettist: Zimmermann; Eberhard Schmidt
- Language: German
- Based on: Der Schuhu und die fliegende Prinzessin by Peter Hacks
- Premiere: 30 December 1976; Semperoper

Der Schuhu und die fliegende Prinzessin (The Bird-Man and the Flying Princess) is a fairy-tale opera in three acts by Udo Zimmermann with a libretto which he wrote with Eberhard Schmidt based on the eponymous fairy tale by Peter Hacks. It was first performed on 30 December 1976 at the Semperoper, Dresden, staged by Harry Kupfer.

== History ==
Zimmermann grew up and studied in the German Democratic Republic. In his opera Die zweite Entscheidung, he had chosen a political topic, a scientist's conflict, located in a present-day city there. In contrast, Der Schuhu und die fliegende Prinzessin is a fairy tale in a utopia, but with political analogies and allusions. Zimmermann wrote the opera on a commission from the Staatsoper Dresden, after completing his opera Levin's Mühle. The libretto, by the composer and Eberhard Schmidt, is based on an eponymous fairy tale by Peter Hacks, which appeared in 1964 in a literary magazine, Sinn und Form, and which was arranged in dramatic form shortly after. The opera was premiered at the Staatsoper on 30 December 1976, staged by Harry Kupfer and conducted by Max Pommer. A first performance in West Germany was staged at the Staatstheater Darmstadt in 1977, and a shorter version was presented at the Salzburg Festival in 1995, directed by Michael Heinicke and conducted by the composer.

Der Schuhu und die fliegende Prinzessin was published by Breitkopf in both the original version which takes about 165 minutes to perform, and the abridged Salzburg version of 120 minutes.

== Plot ==
The fairy tale by Hacks reflects the situation of a divided Germany in the Cold War. It tells of a bird (Schuhu) which can cross borders without problems. The opera has been called a Parabel über Sehnsucht nach Liebe und Glück in anachronistischen Verhältnissen (parable about the desire for love and happiness under anachronistic circumstances).

The wife of a poor tailor delivers her tenth child, which is not a baby but an egg, from which a Schuhu (bird-man) emerges. It can magically turn little into plenty ("aus wenig viel"). The mayor is interested and buys the Schuhu from his father, but as the Schuhu also makes bad things worse, he soon wants rid of it. The Schuhu, unwanted even by its parents, sets off on a series of adventures, first being turned away by the Grand Duke of Coburg-Gotha and then being hired by the Emperor of Mesopotamia as a nightwatchman. He meets the Flying Princess, daughter of the King of Tripoli, and they fall in love. Both the Grand Duke and the Emperor also compete for the Princess, and join their armies to fight the Schuhu. He wins her, but she soon elopes with a Dutchman for a season, before returning to the Schuhu and following him to a new-found land.

== Roles ==
Three of the roles are performed by individuals:

- The Schuhu (baritone)
- The Flying Princess (soprano)
- Mann im Frack (conductor, speaking role)

Twelve actors play further roles, including those of village people, watchmen, snails, spinach plants, warriors, 10,000 scientists and sparrows:

- First Soprano: tailor's wife
- Second Soprano: first snail
- Third Soprano: first spinach plant
- First Contralto: neighbour
- Second Contralto: second snail
- Third Contralto: second spinach plant
- First Tenor: mayor, scientist, warrior
- Second Tenor: superior snail-herd, Schuhulogist
- Third Tenor: first spinach gardener
- First Bass: tailor, king of Tripoli
- Second Bass: emperor of Mesopotamia
- Third Bass: Duke of Coburg-Gotha, Starost of Holland

== Music ==
In a parable, the composer is free to use traditional forms, also to create an ironic distance ("ironische Distanzierung"), but can use creative imagination for sounds of a utopian sphere.

The opera is played by two identical chamber orchestras, both featuring:

- 2 flutes (also piccolo), oboe, 2 clarinets
- French horn, 2 trumpets, trombone
- timpani and percussion
- piano
- singing saw
- solo strings: violin 1+2, viola, cello, double bass

with an additional barrel organ (Leierkasten), being imitated by a quartet of recorders, and tape. All 34 musicians and the technician for the taping play on stage and have scenic actions. The two orchestras symbolize the places of the world in conflict, Coburg-Gotha versus Mesopotamia.

Zimmermann regarded opera as a Lehrspiel (teaching play). One aspect is to use unconventional processes on stage. The opera is obviously a story, in which actors dress on stage for different roles. The orchestras on stage and the conductor take part in the action, which develops from the traditional Bänkelsang of the beginning, with the conductor churning the barrel organ which accompanies the tailor's ballad, to more modern vocal and orchestral sounds. The barrel organ music is transferred to the orchestra at times. The "normal" world with its violence and stupidity is represented by dissonant clusters and crude expressionist music, while Zimmermann uses electronic sound transformation (Klangtransformation) for the sphere of the Schuhu, manipulating instrumental sounds corresponding with the orchestra and not in contrast. This provides new and unheard-of (unerhört) sounds for a more beautiful and liberated world of the future ("eine zukünftige schönere, befreite Welt").

Beginning like a fairy tale, the action moves to analogies with present-day situations and looks at the future. Reviewer Hubert Culot summarises:

This richly colourful score alternates moments of great beauty (often achieved with quite simple means) and episodes of some more aggressive character, this dichotomy evoking the clash between the "normal" world of men and the dream world of the Schuhu.

== Recording ==
A studio recording of a shortened version was made in 1978, with Peter Gülke conducting the Rundfunk-Symphonie-Orchester Leipzig, with soloists Jürgen Freier as the Schuhu, Helga Termer as the Princess, Hans-Joachim Hegewald as narrator, and many others, by the label Berlin Classics Nova 0013012BC.

The scenes also appeared on volume 1 of a collection Neue Musik in der DDR (New music in the GDR), which was reissued in 2002.
