= Lutz-Michael Harder =

German lyric tenor (1942–2019)

- Lutz-Michael Harder, in the 1980s
- Born: 4 September 1942; Langenfeld
- Died: 24 August 2019 (aged 76)
- Occupations: Operatic tenor; Academic teacher
- Organizations: Staatsoper Hannover; Musikhochschule Hannover

Lutz-Michael Harder (4 September 1942 – 24 August 2019) was a German lyric tenor, based in Hanover and known mostly for his interpretation of Mozart operas and as a baroque concert soloist. He also performed contemporary music, such as portraying Hans Scholl in Udo Zimmermann's Weiße Rose at the Hamburg State Opera. He was an academic voice teacher at the Musikhochschule Hannover.

== Life ==
Born in Langenfeld (today Długoszyn), Harder studied church music in Halle, graduating with the A exam. He moved to Hamburg, where he studied voice with Naan Pöld at the Musikhochschule, achieving the concert exam. He made his operatic debut in 1975 at the Eutin Festival as Ferrando in Mozart's Così fan tutte. He became a member of the Oldenburgisches Staatstheater for a year and then was member of the Staatsoper Hannover for several years. In 1978, he appeared as Don Ottavio in Mozart's Don Giovanni at the Ludwigsburg Festival, conducted by Wolfgang Gönnenwein, in a performance that was recorded. In 1985, he starred as Hans Scholl in the world premiere of the second version of Udo Zimmermann's Weiße Rose at the Hamburg State Opera, a role which he reprised and recorded two years later at the Vienna State Opera. He portrayed the title role in the world premiere of Friedrich Goldmann's Robert Hot at the Staatsoper Stuttgart. He perform in major houses throughout Germany, Austria, and Switzerland appearing mainly in the works of Mozart.

Harder also had a prolific concert singing career, particularly as a Bach interpreter. In addition to recording Hans Scholl, Harder recorded the role of Don Ottavio in Don Giovanni, the title role in Carl Martin Reinthaler's Jephtha, and several Bach cantatas, among others.

Harder lectured from 1982 at the Musikhochschule Hannover, where he was appointed professor of voice on 15 March 1989. He taught there for 25 years.
