= Udo Zimmermann =

German composer, musicologist, opera director and conductor (1943–2021)

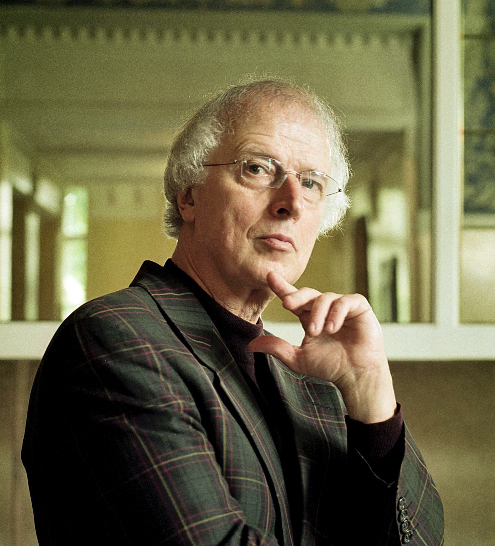
- Zimmermann in 2006
- Born: 6 October 1943; Dresden, Saxony, Germany
- Died: 22 October 2021 (aged 78); Dresden, Germany
- Education: Dresdner Kreuzchor; Musikhochschule Dresden
- Occupations: Composer; Musicologist; Conductor; Opera director
- Organizations: Musikhochschule Dresden; Dresden Center for Contemporary Music; Leipzig Opera; Deutsche Oper Berlin

Udo Zimmermann (6 October 1943 – 22 October 2021 (Note: The date could also be 21 October, or 15 October.)) was a German composer, musicologist, opera director, and conductor. He worked as a professor of composition, founded a centre for contemporary music in Dresden, and was director of the Leipzig Opera and the Deutsche Oper Berlin. He directed a contemporary music series for the Bayerischer Rundfunk and a European centre of the arts in Hellerau. His operas, especially Weiße Rose, on a topic he set to music twice, have been performed internationally, and recorded.

== Biography ==
Born in Dresden, Zimmermann was a member of the Dresdner Kreuzchor from 1954 to 1962, when he completed the Abitur. Directed by Rudolf Mauersberger, Zimmermann was immersed in the works of Johann Sebastian Bach and learned vocal expression, which became a focus of his own compositions. He wrote three motets which were performed by the choir, including a "Vaterunserlied" in 1959. Education in the choir fostered a humanitarian attitude which he kept for life.

He continued his music education at the Hochschule für Musik Carl Maria von Weber, studying composition with Johannes Paul Thilman and also voice and conducting. The works composed during these years include Dramatische Impression für Violoncello und Klavier auf den Tod von J. F. Kennedy (Dramatic impression for cello and piano on the death of John F. Kennedy), composed in 1963, Fünf Gesänge für Bariton und Kammerorchester (Wolfgang Borchert) (Five chants for baritone and chamber orchestra after Wolfgang Borchert), written in 1964, and the opera Weiße Rose based on a libretto by his brother Ingo Zimmermann and composed in 1967/68. The theme of the opera, which he composed as a student, is the White Rose resistance movement of the siblings Hans and Sophie Scholl. From 1968, he studied at the Academy of Arts, Berlin, with Günter Kochan. In the same year he composed Musik für Streicher (Music for strings), his first work including twelve-tone technique and a new organisation of sound processes in levels ("flächig").

In 1970, Zimmermann became dramaturge of the Staatsoper Dresden. In 1978 he was appointed professor of composition at the Dresden Musikhochschule, where he had lectured from 1976. As a conductor, he was invited by major orchestras such as the Berlin Philharmonic, Vienna Symphony, Staatskapelle Dresden, Gewandhausorchester in Leipzig, Orchestre de Radio France in Paris, Tonhalle Orchestra in Zurich, Concertgebouw Orchestra in Amsterdam, Bavarian Radio Symphony Orchestra, NDR Symphony Orchestra in Hamburg, Prague Radio Symphony Orchestra, Warsaw Philharmonic, MDR Symphony Orchestra, and the Berlin Radio Symphony Orchestra. He also appeared as a guest conductor at opera houses in Bonn, Hamburg, Munich and Vienna. He organised productions of his operas in both East and West Germany, and arranged for leading papers to review them.

In 1986, he founded the Dresdner Zentrum für zeitgenössische Musik (Dresden Center for Contemporary Music) as a research center and for concerts and festivals. He returned to his opera topic Weiße Rose and wrote a condensed version for only two voices and ensemble on a text by Wolfgang Willaschek. It premiered at the Opera Stabile, Hamburg, on 27 February 1986, and was staged often. Zimmermann was the artistic director of the Leipzig Opera. During this time, 27 premieres of new works were performed at the house, including several especially for the tricentenary of the opera house. Parts of Stockhausen's Licht were premiered, also Jörg Herchet's nachtwache, staged by Ruth Berghaus, and Dieter Schnebel's "Majakowskis Tod – Totentanz". The house received international attention, presenting Busoni's Doktor Faust staged by Willy Decker, and a cycle of Mozart's operas on librettos by da Ponte, staged by John Dew, among others. From 2001 to 2003 he was general director of the Deutsche Oper Berlin.

Zimmermann directed the series musica viva of contemporary music, run by the broadcaster Bayerischer Rundfunk from 1997 to 2011. He invited notable composers and ensembles to concerts in Munich, many of which were recorded. In 2007/08, he initiated an additional ars musica viva festival, which presented leading radio orchestras and ensembles. The BMW Kompositionspreises, a composition prize for the series, was an award for many new works by young international composers. A total of 175 works were performed, with 161 compositions commissioned by musica viva, and presented in 180 broadcasts. Zimmermann received the broadcaster's Gold Medal for his work over 14 years.

Zimmermann then directed the Europäisches Zentrum der Künste in Dresden-Hellerau (European centre of the arts in Dresden-Hellerau), with a vision of a laboratory for contemporary art ("Labor für zeitgenössische Kunst"), including theatre, dance, architecture, art and media art. He retired from the position in 2008.

Zimmermann died in Dresden two weeks after his 78th birthday. He had suffered from a long illness prior to his death.

== Operas ==
Zimmermann's operas were published by Breitkopf:

- Weiße Rose (1967/1968), opera in eight Bildern (scenes, literally "images") based on a libretto by his brother Ingo Zimmermann, premiered 17 June 1967
- Die zweite Entscheidung (1970), opera in seven Bildern and three interludes based on a libretto by Ingo Zimmermann
- Levins Mühle (1972), opera in nine Bildern based on the novel by Johannes Bobrowski, libretto by Ingo Zimmermann, premiered 27 March 1973 at the Staatsoper Dresden
- Der Schuhu und die fliegende Prinzessin (1976), fairy-tale opera after Peter Hacks in three Abteilungen (divisions), libretto by Udo Zimmermann and Eberhard Schmidt, premiered 30 December 1976 at the Staatsoper Dresden, and a first performance in the West on 13 May 1977 at the Staatstheater Darmstadt
- Die wundersame Schustersfrau (1982), opera in two acts after Federico García Lorca, premiered 25 April 1982 at the Schlosstheater Schwetzingen
- Weiße Rose (1986), chamber opera, scenes for two singers and 15 instrumentalists after texts by Wolfgang Willaschek, premiered 27 February 1986 at the Opera Stabile, Hamburg
- Die Sündflut (1988)

== Publications ==
Zimmermann's publications are held by the German National Library, including:

- Man sieht, was man hört (One sees what one hears), Udo Zimmermann on music and theatre, edited by Frank Geißler, Leipzig 2003.

== Recordings ==
Zimmermann's recordings are held by the German National Library:

- Zimmermann: Die Weisse Rose (1988) Munich Instrumental Ensemble, conducted by Udo Zimmermann with Lutz-Michael Harder, Gabriele Fontana, Orfeo, 162871
- Musik in Deutschland 1950–2000 – Geistliche Oratorien (2005) music by Udo Zimmermann and others, Pfalz Evangelical Youth Choir, Pfalz Landeskirche Chamber Orchestra, Motettenchor Pforzheim, conducted by Heinz Markus Göttsche, Rolf Schweizer, Wolf-Dieter Hauschild, Hans Zender with Gerd Türk, Christiana Baumann, Wolfgang Dallmann, Albrecht Ostertag, RCA 73570 (1 disc)
- Zimmermann, U: Pax Questuosa (2005) Udo Zimmermann (conductor) with Edith Wiens, Roland Hermann, Siegmund Nimsgern, William Cochran, Col Legno 20085
- Musik in der D.D.R. Vol I – Orchestral Music (2005), music by Udo Zimmermann and others, Kurt Sanderling, Herbert Kegel, Günther Herbig, and Siegfried Kurz conducting the Berlin Symphony Orchestra, MDR Leipzig Radio Symphony Orchestra, Staatskapelle Dresden, Berlin Classics 9069 (3 discs)
- New Music in the DDR Vol 1 – Zimmerman: Der Schuhu Highlights (2006) Helga Termer, Günter Neef, Hajo Müller, Armin Ude, Peter Gülke (conductor), Berlin Classics 1301
- Musica Viva 18 – Carter, Zimmermann: Cello Concertos (2010) Bavarian Radio Symphony Orchestra, conducted by Kristjan Järvi, Jan Vogler (cello), Neos 11014
