= Gabriele Fontana =

Austrian operatic soprano

Gabriele Fontana (b. 1958 Innsbruck) is an Austrian operatic soprano.

== Biography ==
Fontana made her professional opera debut in 1980 as Pamina in Die Zauberflöte with Oper Frankfurt. She joined the Hamburg State Opera in 1982 where she sang Pamina, Konstanze in Die Entführung aus dem Serail, Sophie in Der Rosenkavalier and the role of Sophie Scholl in the world premiere of Udo Zimmermann's Weisse Rose; the latter of which she reprised and recorded two years later at the Vienna State Opera. Since then Fontana has been a regular presence at the world's best opera houses making appearances in Hannover, Amsterdam, Berlin, Cologne, Munich, Düsseldorf, Stuttgart, Barcelona, Trieste, Geneva, Tokyo, Philadelphia, Cincinnati, and New York. She has also been a regular performer at the Salzburg Festival and has made appearances at the Glyndebourne Festival, Vienna Festival, the Bregenzer Festspiele, the London Proms, Carinthischer Sommer, Festival di Carpi, Prague Spring Festival, and at festivals in Berlin, Dresden, Israel, the USA and Japan.
