= Antigone oder die Stadt =

1988 opera by Georg Katzer and Gerhard Müller

- Opera by Georg Katzer
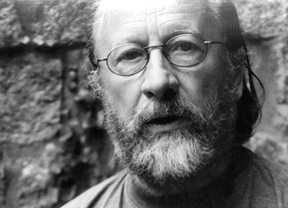
- The composer
- Translation: Antigone or the Town
- Librettist: Gerhard Müller
- Language: German
- Based on: Antigone by Sophocles
- Premiere: 19 November 1991; Komische Oper Berlin

Antigone oder die Stadt (Antigone or The Town) is an opera in two acts, written in collaboration by composer Georg Katzer and librettist Gerhard Müller. They based it on Antigone, the play by Sophocles. Conceived in the German Democratic Republic (GDR) in 1988 as a comment of the East German system, the opera premiered, after German reunification, at the Komische Oper Berlin on 19 November 1991, staged by Harry Kupfer and conducted by Jörg-Peter Weigle.

== History ==
Müller, a librettist and dramaturge, and Katzer conceived the opera in the German Democratic Republic (GDR) in 1988. They chose the play by Sophocles because of its political relevance. The libretto was completed in the summer of 1989, and the score was ready in 1990. The opera was published by Henschel.

The development of the work coincided with the political changes resulting in the German reunification. The premiere was planned for 1989, but was postponed because of the political transition. A new date was planned in September 1991, but a leading singer, Jochen Kowalski, had to cancel the very day because of an infection, and it was postponed again. Antigone oder die Stadt finally premiered on 19 November 1991 at the Komische Oper Berlin, staged by Harry Kupfer and conducted by Jörg-Peter Weigle. The main characters are Antigone (soprano), sung by Yvonne Wiedstruck, her sister Ismini (mezzo-soprano), sung by Christiane Oertel, her fiancé Haimon (tenor), Kreon, his father and King of Thebes (baritone), and the blind seer Teiresias (countertenor), performed by Kowalski.

Katzer continued his focus on classical Greek topics in his oratorio Medea in Korinth, based on the 1996 book Medea: Stimmen by Christa Wolf, rich in inner monologues. It was premiered by the Berliner Singakademie in 2002.

== Theme ==
Müller wrote his libretto in German, giving a modern twist on mythical characters. Kreon is portrayed as a dictator whose immoral laws and administration lead his state to ruin. Haimon, his son, sees that being human would mean not to function ("Ein Mensch sein hieße: nicht zu funktionieren."). Teiresias is pictured as a cynic. Antigone is late for her brother's funeral but shows solidarity with the women who stick to the old order. In the end, the chorus concludes that nothing is more terrible than man ("Nichts ist schrecklicher als der Mensch.").

== Music ==
Katzer, a student of Hanns Eisler and a teacher at the Academy of Arts, Berlin, was a pioneer of electronic music in the GDR and took an interest in multi-media forms. He based his work on "Modi" (modes), scales that are not restricted to an octave and defined by a sequence of intervals. They lead "melodies" and chord combinations that are reminiscent of Bernd Alois Zimmermann and Wolfgang Rihm. The vocal lines show many unusual wide leaps such as tritones and sevenths, for added expressiveness.

A reviewer noted the contrast of scenes, such as a chorus of the Thebans followed by an introverted monologue of Antigone, later a lyric dialogue of Ismimi and Haimon followed by a drastic self-portrait of Kreon. Other scenes include the sentencing of the unruly women, a "recitative and aria" of Teiresias with accordion and plucked bass. Mass scenes of rockers throwing stones in front of a new monument and a battle of the mob in the streets contrast with a soft lamento of Ismini and the last appeal of Antigone, ready to die: "Wir stießen an die Türen der Mächtigen an; ungehört blieb die herzkränkende Qual, unseres Volkes Jammergeschick!" (We pounded at the doors of the mighty; unheard remained the heart-wrenched agony, our people's mournful fate!)
