= Mark Lundberg =

American opera singer

Mark F. Lundberg
- Born: Mark Fiedler Lundberg; March 25, 1958; Englewood, Colorado, US
- Died: August 15, 2008 (aged 50); Long Island, New York, US
- Education: Indiana University
- Known for: Samson in Samson and Delilah
- Children: 4

Mark Lundberg (25 March 1958 – 15 August 2008) was an American opera singer who had an active international career from the 1980s up until his sudden death in 2008. He began his career as a bass, then progressed to portraying baritone parts, and finally settled as a dramatic tenor, winning acclaim portraying Wagnerian heroes like Siegfried, Tristan and other standards of the dramatic repertoire. Samson from Saint-Saëns's Samson and Delilah and the title role in Giuseppe Verdi's Otello became "calling cards" for him. Standing at six and a half feet and possessing a big frame and a dark beard, Lundberg made a striking figure on stage. His shoulders measured 6 and a half feet around and the Denver Post once Described as "a big blonde bear of a man", a fitting description for such a large man

== Biography ==
Born in Denver, Colorado, Lundberg was the son of an Episcopalian priest, and his earliest music experiences were singing in his father's church choir. He studied singing at Indiana University under the great Wagnerian soprano Margaret Harshaw. After spending some time in college, he moved to New York City, where he pursued further studies with Maitland Peters.

Two important early successes for Lundberg came in 1988, when he sang in the United States premieres of Richard Strauss's Friedenstag and Krzysztof Penderecki's Die schwarze Maske, both with the Santa Fe Opera. Over the next decade he sang mainly in second tier houses in the United States and Europe, and it wasn't until the early 1990s that his career began to take him to major opera houses around the world. During this time he sang his first Bacchus in Strauss's Ariadne auf Naxos with the Opera Nice (France) and later with Lyric Opera of Kansas City in 1995.

In 1997 Lundberg sang the role of Samson for his first appearance with the Scottish Opera. He would go on to sing that role several more times over the next eleven years, including performances with the Orquesta Sinfónica de Xalapa, New Orleans Opera, Opera Omaha, Michigan Opera Theatre, and Hawaii Opera Theatre. He made his debut with the San Francisco Opera in 1999 as the Drum Major in Wozzeck. He sang Tristan in Wagner's Tristan und Isolde for his first performance with Opera North in 2001. In 2002 he sang the title role in Verdi's Otello for the first time with Utah Opera, a role which he sang frequently over the next six years in such houses as the Teatro Arriaga, Hawaii Opera Theatre, Opera Ontario, Opera Lyra Ottawa, and the Manitoba Opera Association. In 2003 he made his first appearance at the Lyric Opera of Chicago portraying the title role in Wagner's Siegfried under conductor Sir Andrew Davis. He made his debut at the Metropolitan Opera on October 5, 2005 as the Officer in Ariadne auf Naxos with Violeta Urmana in the title role. In 2006 he sang Tristan at the Théâtre Royal de la Monnaie in Brussels.

In 1994, Mark recorded the first Act of Die Walkyre with Edda Moser on Calig records.

Lundberg died at the age of fifty after a brief illness. Surviving was his wife Anya Youngblood Lundberg, mother of his first and only son Richard Noble Lundberg. In addition he had three daughters with his previous wife, whom served as the Chicago Symphony Orchestra's second pianist, the late Melody Lord Lundberg. At the time of his death, Lundberg was scheduled to perform Samson at the Anna Livia International Opera Festival in Dublin in the summer of 2008 and with the Pittsburgh Opera in October 2008.
