= Michael Sylvester (tenor) =

American opera singer

Michael Lane Sylvester (born August 21, 1951), is an American operatic lyric-spinto tenor. In the course of his 25-year career on the opera stage, he appeared in leading tenor roles at many of the world's opera houses, including the Metropolitan Opera, La Scala, La Fenice, the Paris Opera, and London's Royal Opera House. He retired from performing in May 2001 and now teaches voice.

== Early life and education ==
Sylvester was born in Noblesville, Indiana. He received a Bachelor of Music degree from Westminster Choir College and a Master of Music degree from Indiana University, where he studied under Margaret Harshaw.

== Career ==
Sylvester made his professional singing debut as the tenor soloist in the Verdi Requiem in 1975 and his operatic debut as Riccardo in Ballo in Maschera. He initially sang in smaller American opera houses before embarking on an international career, making his debut at the Paris Opera as Polione in Norma, his La Scala debut in 1990 as Pinkerton in Madama Butterfly, and his Royal Opera House debut in 1991 as Don José in Carmen. A Metropolitan Opera National Council winner in 1986, Sylvester made his Met debut on April 12, 1991, as Rodolfo in Luisa Miller. His other roles with the company included the title role in Don Carlos, Pinkerton in Madama Butterfly, Radames in Aida, Calaf in Turandot, and Gabriele Adorno in Simon Boccanegra. His last appearance there was on October 20, 2000, as Calaf. He retired from the opera stage in May 2001. He was described by Elizabeth Forbes as "a powerful actor" who has "a strong bright-toned voice, with an authentic italianate ring."

In October 2001, Sylvester made his professional directing debut staging Aida for the Indianapolis Opera. He taught singing both privately and as a faculty member at DePaul University School of Music.

Sylvester is an associate professor of voice at Wichita State University. He continues to perform in recitals and concerts. He is Co-Founder and Co-Director with Joseph McClain of the San Miguel Institute of Bel Canto in San Miguel de Allende.

== Recordings ==
- Messiaen: La Transfiguration de Notre Seigneur Jésus-Christ (as tenor soloist). National Symphony Orchestra and the Westminster Symphonic Choir, Antal Doráti (conductor). Label: Decca Records (CD), 1990
- Puccini: Turandot (as Calaf). San Francisco Opera Orchestra and Chorus, Donald Runnicles (conductor). Label: Arthaus (DVD), 1994
- Verdi: Don Carlo (as Don Carlo). Metropolitan Opera Orchestra and Chorus, James Levine (conductor). Label: Sony Classical (CD), 1993
