= Die schwarze Maske =

Opera by Krzysztof Penderecki

- Opera by Krzysztof Penderecki
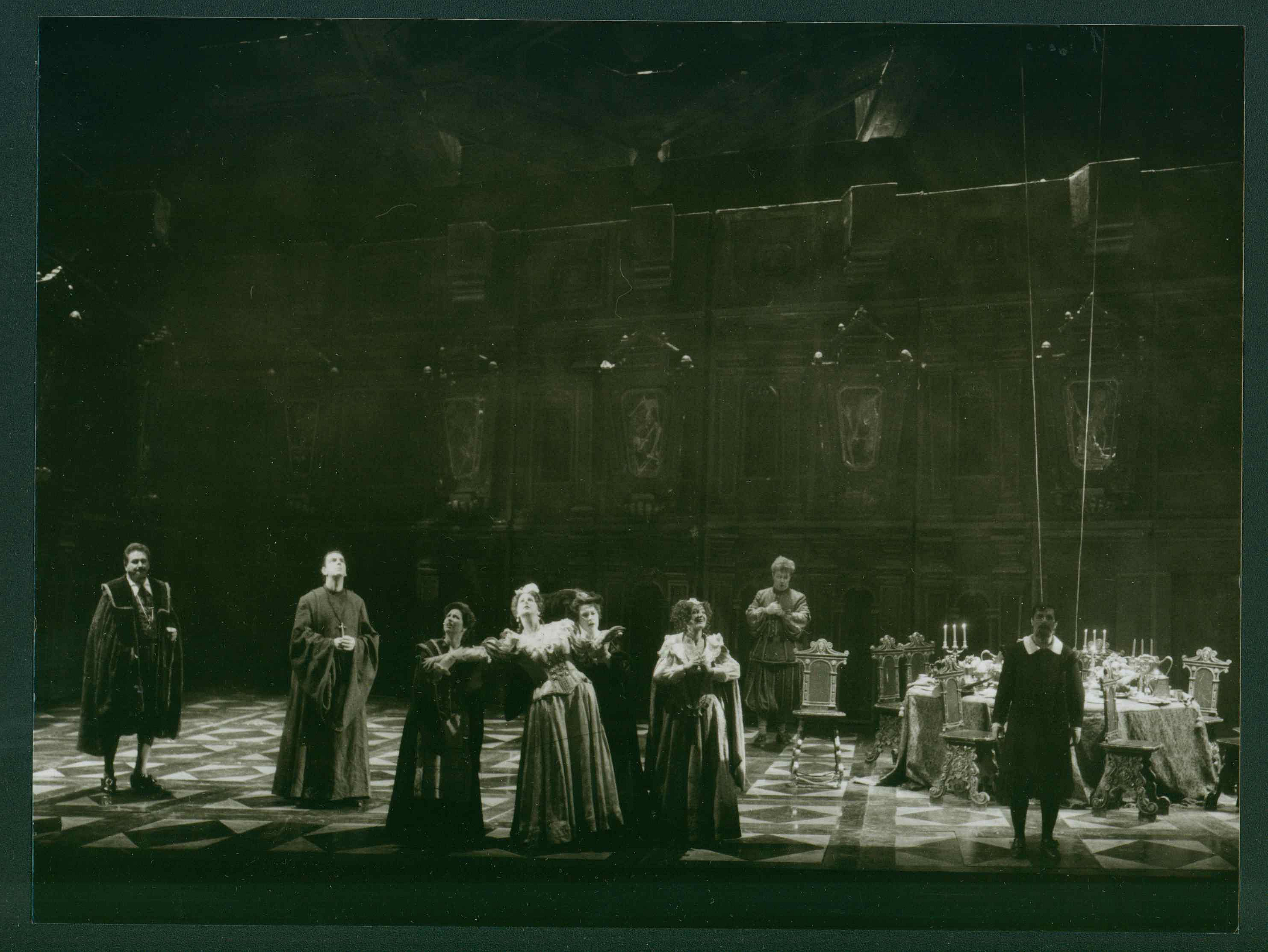
- Badisches Staatstheater Karlsruhe (1991)
- Translation: The Black Mask
- Librettist: Penderecki; Harry Kupfer
- Language: German
- Based on: play by Gerhart Hauptmann
- Premiere: 15 August 1986; Salzburg Festival

Die schwarze Maske ('The Black Mask') is an opera by composer Krzysztof Penderecki using a German libretto by the composer and Harry Kupfer which is based on a 1928 play by Gerhart Hauptmann. The opera premiered at the Salzburg Festival on 15 August 1986, after which there were productions mounted at the Vienna State Opera and the Great Theatre, Warsaw during the following opera season. The work had its United States premiere on 30 July 1988 at the Santa Fe Opera with a cast that included Mark Lundberg.

== Roles ==
Role	Voice type	Premiere Cast
Silvanus Schuller	tenor	Walter Raffeiner
Benigna	soprano	Josephine Barstow
Arabella	soprano	Lona Culmer-Schellbach
Rosa Sacchi	mezzo-soprano	Marjana Lipovšek
Jedidja Potter	tenor	Martin Finke
François Tortebat	bass	Hans Franzen
Daga	soprano	Jolanta Radek
Löwel Perl	baritone	Günter Reich
Robert Dedo	baritone	Huub Claessens
Plebanus Wendt	bass	Malcolm Smith
Hadank	tenor	Heinz Zednik
Graf Ebbo Hüttenwächter	bass	Rainer Scholze
Gräfin Laura Hüttenwächter	contralto	Gertrude Jahn
Schedel	tenor	Robert Werner
Doktor Knoblochzer	bass	Wolfgang Equiluz
Johnson	speaking role	Charleston Marquis
A contralto voice	contralto	Ingrid Mayr

== Exgternal links ==
Media related to Die schwarze Maske (opera) at Wikimedia Commons
