= Jörg-Peter Weigle =

German conductor and music professor (born 1953)

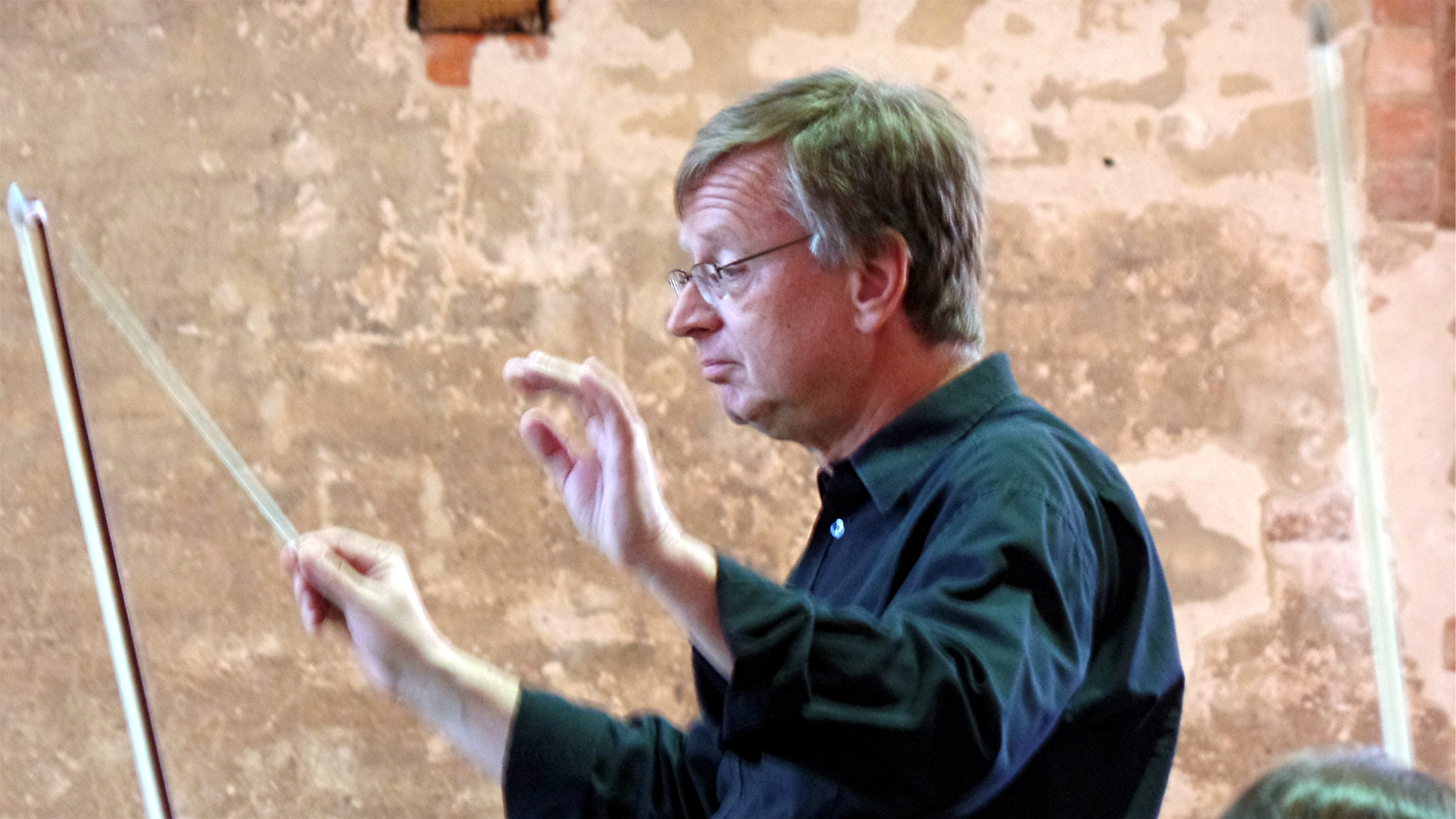
Weigle in 2019

Jörg-Peter Weigle (born 1953, in Greifswald), is a German conductor and music professor. He is the uncle of the conductor Sebastian Weigle and the violist Friedemann Weigle. Weigle received his first musical training from 1963 to 1971 as a member of the Thomanerchor in Leipzig. From 1973 to 1978, he studied at the Hochschule für Musik "Hanns Eisler" in Berlin, where his teachers included Horst Förster (conducting), Dietrich Knothe (choral conducting) and Ruth Zechlin (counterpoint). He later participated in master classes with Kurt Masur and Witold Rowicki.

From 1977 to 1980, Weigle was conductor of the Neubrandenburg State Symphony Orchestra. He was a regular conductor of the Leipzig Radio Choir from 1980 to 1988, and became chief conductor in 1985. Weigle was principal conductor of the Dresden Philharmonic from 1986 to 1994. He conducted world premieres, including Georg Katzer's opera Antigone oder die Stadt. From 1995 to 2002, he was Generalmusikdirektor (GMD) of the Stuttgarter Philharmoniker.

Since 2001, Weigle has been a professor of choral conducting at the Hochschule für Musik "Hanns Eisler". On 1 April 2008, he became the school's rector. He retired from the position in 2012. From 2003, he has been artistic director of the Philharmonischer Chor Berlin. From 1 September 2018, Weigle has been Generalmusikdirektor of the Brandenburgisches Staatsorchester Frankfurt.

== Awards ==
Weigle received the Sächsische Verfassungsmedaille on 26 May 1997 from Erich Iltgen, president of the Saxon Landtag. On 1 May 2017, he was awarded the Georg-Friedrich-Händel-Ring of the Verband Deutscher Konzertchöre. He received the Geschwister-Mendelssohn-Medaille of the Chorverband Berlin on 22 June 2017.

Preceded by Carlos Kalmar	Chief Conductor, Stuttgart Philharmonic Orchestra; 1995–2002	Succeeded by Gabriel Feltz
