= Caspar Richter =

German conductor

- Caspar Richter c. 2000
- Born: 16 September 1944; Lübeck
- Died: 2 February 2023 (aged 78)
- Occupation: Conductor
- Organizations: Deutsche Oper Berlin; Vereinigte Bühnen Wien

Caspar Richter (16 September 1944 – 2 February 2023) was a German conductor. He worked from 1969 at the Deutsche Oper Berlin where he conducted world premieres of operas such as Wilhelm Dieter Siebert's Untergang der Titanic and Toshiro Mayuzumi's Kinkakuji. He moved to Vienna in 1982, conducting ballets at the Vienna State Opera, and operas and operettas at the Volksoper. He was co-founder and chief conductor of the Vereinigte Bühnen Wien from 1987 for 23 years, focused on the production of new musicals such as Elisabeth and German premieres of popular musicals such as A Chorus Line.

== Life and career ==
Caspar Richter was born in Lübeck on 16 September 1944. His father, who had been pastor of a small German parish in Prague, was then pastor at the Protestant Aegidienkirche, and Caspar grew up with seven siblings. He sang in the Knabenkantorei (boys' chorale), focused on Bach's works, and learned to play piano and organ. His organ teacher, Georg Goebel), introduced him to the works of Olivier Messiaen. He played the piano at a dancing bar in Travemünde on weekends.

Richter studied at the Musikhochschule Hamburg, besides conducting composition, piano and percussion. As a student, he founded an ensemble for contemporary music, and was assistant to the choral conductor Helmut Franz.

=== Berlin ===
In 1969 Lorin Maazel offered Richter a position as repetiteur and assistant conductor at the Deutsche Oper Berlin where Maazel was then music director. Richter served as assistant to Karl Böhm, Eugen Jochum, Herbert von Karajan, Bruno Maderna, Giuseppe Sinopoli and Michael Gielen, and learned to be responsive to singers and give clear impulses to the orchestra players. Richter was promoted to Kapellmeister after three years at the house. He conducted their first production of Stravinsky's L'Histoire du soldat. In 1972, he stepped in for Klaus Tennstedt to conduct von Einem's Der Besuch der alten Dame. He conducted Boris Blacher's Preußisches Märchen, world premieres such as Karl Heinz Wahren's Fettklößchen, Wilhelm Dieter Siebert's Untergang der Titanic. and Toshiro Mayuzumi's Kinkakuji. He led productions of Lehár's Die lustige Witwe, staged by August Everding with Gwyneth Jones and René Kollo in the leading roles, and Offenbach's Die Banditen. He also conducted the RIAS-Jugendorchester for several years.

=== Vienna ===
Richter followed Maazel to the Vienna State Opera in 1982, where he conducted a few operas, Mozart's Die Entführung aus dem Serail and Alban Berg's Wozzeck, and many ballets including Prokofiev's Romeo und Julia and Josephs Legende by Richard Strauss in 1982, in 1983 Baier's Die Puppenfee, Tchaikovsky's Dornröschen and Schwanensee, in 1984 Der Nussknacker, and in 1987 De Falla's Der Dreispitz.

Richter first conducted at the Volksoper in Vienna in April 1983, a new production of Lortzing's Der Wildschütz; in 153 performances at the theatre he conducted a world premiere, of the operetta Gilbert & Sullivan in 1983, and five opening nights. Among the operas were Mozart's Entführung, Rossini's Der Barbier von Sevilla, Humperdinck's Hänsel und Gretel and Puccini's Der Mantel and Gianni Schicchi. He led operettas including Die Fledermaus by Johann Strauss and Orpheus in der Unterwelt.

In Vienna, he was a co-founder of the orchestra of the Vereinigte Bühnen Wien, focused on musicals, and conducted it for 23 years. The orchestra served the Theater an der Wien, the Raimund Theater and the Ronacher. According to his obituary in Wiener Zeitung, the classically trained Richter saw no fundamental difference between "light music" and complex classical music as long as works met his standards. They performed the world premieres of first Freudiana in 1990, Elisabeth, Mozart!, Wake Up in 2002 and Rebecca, and the premieres in German of A Chorus Line, Les Misérables, The Phantom of the Opera and Romeo et Juliette. He also conducted the orchestra for the world premiere of Gottfried von Einem's Tulifant at the Ronacher in 1990, and took Elisabeth on a tour to Japan. He conducted contemporary classical music. by composers such as Antonio Bibalo, Boris Blacher, Luigi Dallapiccola, Hans Werner Henze and Aribert Reimann.

=== Later years ===
After retiring from the Vereinigte Bühnen Wien, Richter became chief conductor of the Brno Opera and honorary conductor of the Brno Philharmonic.

He performed the world premiere of Joe Zawinul's First Symphony at the Brucknerfest in Linz. He recorded the complete orchestral works by Erich Wolfgang Korngold with the Bruckner Orchestra Linz.

Richter died on 2 February 2023.

== Awards and honors ==
- 2008 Ehrenzeichen für Verdienste um das Land Wien
- Ehrenkreuz für Wissenschaft und Kunst
