= List of Bayreuth Festival productions of Der Ring des Nibelungen =

This list provides details of all the performances of Richard Wagner's opera cycle Der Ring des Nibelungen produced at the Bayreuth Festival, from the festival's inception in 1876 up to 2022. For differing reasons, no festivals were held between 1877 and 1881, 1915 to 1923, and 1943 to 1950. There were a few other years when the festival was "rested", and some in which it was dedicated to other Wagner operas.

The Bayreuth Festival Orchestra has always been involved in these productions, and apart from some productions, the festival has since 1876 been under the overall control of a member of the Wagner family.

Since the revival of the festival after the Second World War, a general principle has been developed in which new productions are introduced to the festival at regular intervals, each such production being staged for five years followed by a "rest" year.

There have been 222 performances of the Ring cycle performed at Bayreuth from 1876 to 2017.

== List of performances ==
Year	Stage director	Conductor(s)	Notes
1876	Richard Wagner	Hans Richter	3 cycles of Wagner's original production were performed.
1896	Cosima Wagner	Felix Mottl; Hans Richter; Siegfried Wagner	29 cycles of this production were performed under Cosima and Siegfried Wagner. Cosima's involvement was largely symbolic after 1908.
1897	Cosima Wagner	Hans Richter; Siegfried Wagner	29 cycles of this production were performed under Cosima and Siegfried Wagner. Cosima's involvement was largely symbolic after 1908.
1899	Cosima Wagner	Siegfried Wagner	29 cycles of this production were performed under Cosima and Siegfried Wagner. Cosima's involvement was largely symbolic after 1908.
1901	Cosima Wagner, Siegfried Wagner	Hans Richter; Siegfried Wagner	29 cycles of this production were performed under Cosima and Siegfried Wagner. Cosima's involvement was largely symbolic after 1908.
1902	Cosima Wagner, Siegfried Wagner	Hans Richter; Siegfried Wagner	29 cycles of this production were performed under Cosima and Siegfried Wagner. Cosima's involvement was largely symbolic after 1908.
1904	Cosima Wagner, Siegfried Wagner	Hans Richter; Franz Beidler (Note: Beidler was Cosima Wagner's son-in-law.)	29 cycles of this production were performed under Cosima and Siegfried Wagner. Cosima's involvement was largely symbolic after 1908.
1906	Cosima Wagner, Siegfried Wagner	Hans Richter; Siegfried Wagner	29 cycles of this production were performed under Cosima and Siegfried Wagner. Cosima's involvement was largely symbolic after 1908.
1908	Cosima Wagner, Siegfried Wagner	Hans Richter	29 cycles of this production were performed under Cosima and Siegfried Wagner. Cosima's involvement was largely symbolic after 1908.
1909	Cosima Wagner, Siegfried Wagner	Michael Balling	29 cycles of this production were performed under Cosima and Siegfried Wagner. Cosima's involvement was largely symbolic after 1908.
1911	Cosima Wagner, Siegfried Wagner	Michael Balling	29 cycles of this production were performed under Cosima and Siegfried Wagner. Cosima's involvement was largely symbolic after 1908.
1912	Cosima Wagner, Siegfried Wagner	Michael Balling	29 cycles of this production were performed under Cosima and Siegfried Wagner. Cosima's involvement was largely symbolic after 1908.
1914	Cosima Wagner, Siegfried Wagner	Michael Balling	29 cycles of this production were performed under Cosima and Siegfried Wagner. Cosima's involvement was largely symbolic after 1908.
1924	Siegfried Wagner	Michael Balling	14 cycles of this production were performed under Siegfried Wagner.
1925	Siegfried Wagner	Michael Balling	14 cycles of this production were performed under Siegfried Wagner.
1927	Siegfried Wagner	Franz von Hoesslin	14 cycles of this production were performed under Siegfried Wagner.
1928	Siegfried Wagner	Franz von Hoesslin; Siegfried Wagner	14 cycles of this production were performed under Siegfried Wagner.
1930	Siegfried Wagner	Karl Elmendorff	14 cycles of this production were performed under Siegfried Wagner.
1931	Siegfried Wagner	Karl Elmendorff	14 cycles of this production were performed under Siegfried Wagner.
1933	Heinz Tietjen	Karl Elmendorff	First Bayreuth Ring not directed by a Wagner family member 18 cycles of this production were performed under Tietjen.
1934	Heinz Tietjen	Karl Elmendorff; Heinz Tietjen	First Bayreuth Ring not directed by a Wagner family member 18 cycles of this production were performed under Tietjen.
1936	Heinz Tietjen	Heinz Tietjen; Wilhelm Furtwängler	First Bayreuth Ring not directed by a Wagner family member 18 cycles of this production were performed under Tietjen.
1937	Heinz Tietjen	Wilhelm Furtwängler	First Bayreuth Ring not directed by a Wagner family member 18 cycles of this production were performed under Tietjen.
1938	Heinz Tietjen	Heinz Tietjen	First Bayreuth Ring not directed by a Wagner family member 18 cycles of this production were performed under Tietjen.
1939	Heinz Tietjen	Heinz Tietjen	First Bayreuth Ring not directed by a Wagner family member 18 cycles of this production were performed under Tietjen.
1940	Heinz Tietjen	Franz von Hoesslin	First Bayreuth Ring not directed by a Wagner family member 18 cycles of this production were performed under Tietjen.
1941	Heinz Tietjen	Heinz Tietjen	First Bayreuth Ring not directed by a Wagner family member 18 cycles of this production were performed under Tietjen.
1942	Heinz Tietjen	Karl Elmendorff	First Bayreuth Ring not directed by a Wagner family member 18 cycles of this production were performed under Tietjen.
1951	Wieland Wagner	Hans Knappertsbusch; Herbert von Karajan	16 cycles of this production were performed under Wieland Wagner.
1952	Wieland Wagner	Joseph Keilberth	16 cycles of this production were performed under Wieland Wagner.
1953	Wieland Wagner	Joseph Keilberth; Clemens Krauss	16 cycles of this production were performed under Wieland Wagner.
1954	Wieland Wagner	Joseph Keilberth	16 cycles of this production were performed under Wieland Wagner.
1955	Wieland Wagner	Joseph Keilberth	16 cycles of this production were performed under Wieland Wagner.
1956	Wieland Wagner	Joseph Keilberth; Hans Knappertsbusch	16 cycles of this production were performed under Wieland Wagner.
1957	Wieland Wagner	Hans Knappertsbusch	16 cycles of this production were performed under Wieland Wagner.
1958	Wieland Wagner	Hans Knappertsbusch	16 cycles of this production were performed under Wieland Wagner.
1960	Wolfgang Wagner	Rudolf Kempe	11 cycles of this production were performed under Wolfgang Wagner.
1961	Wolfgang Wagner	Rudolf Kempe	11 cycles of this production were performed under Wolfgang Wagner.
1962	Wolfgang Wagner	Rudolf Kempe	11 cycles of this production were performed under Wolfgang Wagner.
1963	Wolfgang Wagner	Rudolf Kempe	11 cycles of this production were performed under Wolfgang Wagner.
1964	Wolfgang Wagner	Berislav Klobučar	11 cycles of this production were performed under Wolfgang Wagner.
1965	Wieland Wagner	Karl Böhm	Wieland died in October 1966; his production continued under Wolfgang until 1969. 12 cycles of this production were performed.
1966	Wieland Wagner	Karl Böhm; Otmar Suitner	Wieland died in October 1966; his production continued under Wolfgang until 1969. 12 cycles of this production were performed.
1967	Wolfgang Wagner	Karl Böhm; Otmar Suitner	Wieland died in October 1966; his production continued under Wolfgang until 1969. 12 cycles of this production were performed.
1968	Wolfgang Wagner	Lorin Maazel	Wieland died in October 1966; his production continued under Wolfgang until 1969. 12 cycles of this production were performed.
1969	Wolfgang Wagner	Lorin Maazel	Wieland died in October 1966; his production continued under Wolfgang until 1969. 12 cycles of this production were performed.
1970	Wolfgang Wagner	Horst Stein	16 cycles of this production were performed under Wolfgang Wagner.
1971	Wolfgang Wagner	Horst Stein	16 cycles of this production were performed under Wolfgang Wagner.
1972	Wolfgang Wagner	Horst Stein	16 cycles of this production were performed under Wolfgang Wagner.
1973	Wolfgang Wagner	Horst Stein	16 cycles of this production were performed under Wolfgang Wagner.
1974	Wolfgang Wagner	Horst Stein	16 cycles of this production were performed under Wolfgang Wagner.
1975	Wolfgang Wagner	Horst Stein	16 cycles of this production were performed under Wolfgang Wagner.
1976	Patrice Chéreau	Pierre Boulez	Centenary Ring production 16 cycles of this production were performed under Chéreau.
1977	Patrice Chéreau	Pierre Boulez	Centenary Ring production 16 cycles of this production were performed under Chéreau.
1978	Patrice Chéreau	Pierre Boulez	Centenary Ring production 16 cycles of this production were performed under Chéreau.
1979	Patrice Chéreau	Pierre Boulez	Centenary Ring production 16 cycles of this production were performed under Chéreau.
1980	Patrice Chéreau	Pierre Boulez	Centenary Ring production 16 cycles of this production were performed under Chéreau.
1983	Peter Hall	Georg Solti	12 cycles of this production were performed under Hall.
1984	Peter Hall	Peter Schneider	12 cycles of this production were performed under Hall.
1985	Peter Hall	Peter Schneider	12 cycles of this production were performed under Hall.
1986	Peter Hall	Peter Schneider	12 cycles of this production were performed under Hall.
1988	Harry Kupfer	Daniel Barenboim	15 cycles of this production were performed under Kupfer.
1989	Harry Kupfer	Daniel Barenboim	15 cycles of this production were performed under Kupfer.
1990	Harry Kupfer	Daniel Barenboim	15 cycles of this production were performed under Kupfer.
1991	Harry Kupfer	Daniel Barenboim	15 cycles of this production were performed under Kupfer.
1992	Harry Kupfer	Daniel Barenboim	15 cycles of this production were performed under Kupfer.
1994	Alfred Kirchner	James Levine	15 cycles of this production were performed under Kirchner.
1995	Alfred Kirchner	James Levine	15 cycles of this production were performed under Kirchner.
1996	Alfred Kirchner	James Levine	15 cycles of this production were performed under Kirchner.
1997	Alfred Kirchner	James Levine	15 cycles of this production were performed under Kirchner.
1998	Alfred Kirchner	James Levine	15 cycles of this production were performed under Kirchner.
2000	Jürgen Flimm	Giuseppe Sinopoli	15 cycles of this production were performed under Flimm.
2001	Jürgen Flimm	Ádám Fischer	15 cycles of this production were performed under Flimm.
2002	Jürgen Flimm	Ádám Fischer	15 cycles of this production were performed under Flimm.
2003	Jürgen Flimm	Ádám Fischer	15 cycles of this production were performed under Flimm.
2004	Jürgen Flimm	Ádám Fischer	15 cycles of this production were performed under Flimm.
2006	Tankred Dorst	Christian Thielemann	15 cycles of this production were performed under Dorst.
2007	Tankred Dorst	Christian Thielemann	15 cycles of this production were performed under Dorst.
2008	Tankred Dorst	Christian Thielemann	15 cycles of this production were performed under Dorst.
2009	Tankred Dorst	Christian Thielemann	15 cycles of this production were performed under Dorst.
2010	Tankred Dorst	Christian Thielemann	15 cycles of this production were performed under Dorst.
2013	Frank Castorf	Kirill Petrenko	15 cycles of this production were performed under Castorf.
2014	Frank Castorf	Kirill Petrenko	15 cycles of this production were performed under Castorf.
2015	Frank Castorf	Kirill Petrenko	15 cycles of this production were performed under Castorf.
2016	Frank Castorf	Marek Janowski	15 cycles of this production were performed under Castorf.
2017	Frank Castorf	Marek Janowski	15 cycles of this production were performed under Castorf.
2018	Frank Castorf	Plácido Domingo	3 performances of Die Walküre, also directed by Castorf, were presented in 2018. This is the first time in the festival's history where it was performed apart from the rest of the cycle.
2022	Valentin Schwarz	Cornelius Meister	The production was originally scheduled for 2020 but was postponed to 2022 due to the COVID-19 pandemic.
2023	Valentin Schwarz	Pietari Inkinen	The production was originally scheduled for 2020 but was postponed to 2022 due to the COVID-19 pandemic.
2024	Valentin Schwarz	Simone Young	The production was originally scheduled for 2020 but was postponed to 2022 due to the COVID-19 pandemic.
2025	Valentin Schwarz	Simone Young	The production was originally scheduled for 2020 but was postponed to 2022 due to the COVID-19 pandemic.
2026	Marcus Lobbes	Christian Thielemann	To celebrate the 150th anniversary of the Bayreuth Festival, a traditional staging was dispensed with. Instead, AI projections were used, which displayed images synthesised from many previous productions.
