= Kurt Gossweiler =

German historian of fascism (1917–2017)

Kurt Gossweiler (November 5, 1917, Stuttgart – May 15, 2017, Berlin) was a German Marxist–Leninist historian and economist specializing in the history and economic structure of fascism.

== Biography ==
Born in to a communist family, he was a member of the Socialist Student Union from a young age. After the Nazi seizure of power in 1933 he was active in the now illegal Young Communist League of Germany. After graduating from high school he studied economics in Berlin and later became a member of the Reich Labour Service.

After the start of the Second World War Gossweiler was drafted in to the Wehrmacht and in 1943 he defected to the Red Army and attended an anti-fascist school. He was also active in the National Committee for a Free Germany.

Upon his return to Germany he joined the Socialist Unity Party and became a teacher at a local party school. He devoted himself to the study of contemporary German history at the Humboldt University and received his doctorate in 1963 with his work Die Rolle des Monopolkapitals bei der Herbeiführung der Röhm-Affäre (The Role of Monopoly Capital in the Röhm Affair). Gossweiler received the Bronze Patriotic Order of Merit in 1973. He was a research assistant in the Institute of History of the Academy of Sciences of the DDR.

In 1988 Gossweiler received an honorary degree from the Humboldt University. He was also active in the Stasi.

After German reunification Gossweiler became a member of the Party of Democratic Socialism until he became a co founder of a small splinter party called the Communist Initiative.

In a lecture at the International Meeting of Communist and Workers' Parties in Brussels in 1994, Gossweiler declared "anti-Stalinism" to be the "main obstacle to the unity of all anti-imperialist forces and the communist movement". He defended Joseph Stalin and stated that the purges of the 1930s had saved the Soviet Union from a "fifth column" and thus secured victory in World War II.

== Fields of research ==
A leading historian in the German Democratic Republic, Gossweiler's historical works on fascism and the rise of the Nazi Party further developed the Marxist–Leninist definition of fascism. He was a defender of the "Dimitrov Thesis".

He saw the aim of fascism as the "nationalization of the workers", and the recruitment of the working masses in the service of a movement of capitalist ideology, while seeking to destroy the trade union movement and genuinely workers-led parties that are in defense of workers' interests. The reference to "socialism" in the expression National Socialism has never gone beyond a form of propaganda to attract workers desiring an alternative to failed capitalism in a social democratic way.

His intensive study demonstrates the links that very early in the history of the Nazi Party, was established with the big German capital, the big landowners, the military, the German nobility and the German industrialist class. These links, which translated into massive funding, preceded the Nazis' electoral ascendancy and was a factor that allowed this rise, not the reverse, and that it was Hitler's popularity that attracted funding.

None of his published works have been translated into English. A set of articles written by Kurt Gossweiler during the 1970-1980s were published in 2006 by the French editorial Editions Aden, with a foreword by the historian and communist activist Annie Lacroix-Riz.

== Works ==
- Großbanken, Industriemonopole und Staat. Ökonomie und Politik des staatsmonopolistischen Kapitalismus in Deutschland 1914–1932, Berlin 1971; Papyrossa, Köln 2013,
- zusammen mit Dietrich Eichholtz (Hrsg.): Faschismusforschung. Positionen, Probleme, Polemik. Berlin 1980.
- Kapital, Reichswehr und NSDAP 1919–1924. Berlin 1982 (Neuauflage: Köln 2011),
- Die Röhm-Affäre. Hintergründe – Zusammenhänge – Auswirkungen. Pahl-Rugenstein, Köln 1983. Zugleich 1963 als Dissertation an der Humboldt-Universität unter dem Titel: Die Rolle des Monopolkapitals bei der Herbeiführung der Röhm-Affäre.
- Der Putsch, der keiner war: die Röhm-Affäre 1934 und der Richtungskampf im deutschen Faschismus, PapyRossa Köln 2009. Neuausgabe von Die Röhm-Affäre von 1983.
- zusammen mit Klaus Drobisch und Dietrich Eichholtz: Faschismus in Deutschland, Faschismus der Gegenwart. Köln 1983.
- Aufsätze zum Faschismus. Berlin 1986.
- Die Strasser-Legende. Auseinandersetzung mit einem Kapitel des deutschen Faschismus. Berlin 1994, ISBN 978-3-929161-10-6
- Wider den Revisionismus. München 1997
- Die Taubenfuß-Chronik oder Die Chruschtschowiade 1953–1964 (Bd. I), München 2002,
- Die Taubenfuß-Chronik oder Die Chruschtschowiade 1957–1976 (Bd. II), München 2005
- zusammen mit Peter Hacks: Der Briefwechsel 1996–2003, in: Peter Hacks: Am Ende verstehen sie es. Politische Schriften 1988–2003, André Thiele (Hrsg.), Eulenspiegel, Berlin 2005.
- Der Anti-Stalinismus – das Haupthindernis für die Einheit aller antiimperialistischen Kräfte und der kommunistischen Bewegung. Rede des Genossen Dr. Kurt Gossweiler (Deutschland) auf dem internationalen Seminar kommunistischer und Arbeiterparteien in Brüssel am 1. Mai 1994, Ernst-Thälmann-Verlag, Berlin 2005.
- zusammen mit Dieter Itzerott: Die Entwicklung der SED. In: Unter Feuer. Die Konterrevolution in der DDR., Offensiv, Hannover 2009
