= Georg Katzer =

German composer and teacher (1935–2019)

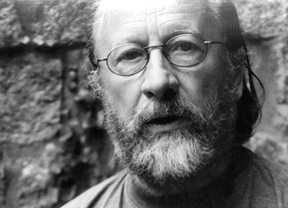
- Born: 10 January 1935; Habelschwerdt, Lower Silesia
- Died: 7 May 2019 (aged 84); Zeuthen, Germany
- Occupation: Composer
- Awards: Art Prize of the German Democratic Republic; Order of Merit of the Federal Republic of Germany

Georg Katzer (German pronunciation: [ˈɡeː.ɔrk kat͡sɐ]; 10 January 1935 – 7 May 2019) was a German composer and teacher. The last master student of Hanns Eisler, he composed music in many genres, including works for the stage. Katzer was one of the pioneers of electronic new music in the German Democratic Republic and the founder of the first electronic-music studio in the GDR. He held leading positions in music organisations, first in the East (Akademie der Künste der DDR), then in the united Germany (Academy of Arts, Berlin, and Deutscher Musikrat), and received many awards, including the Art Prize of the German Democratic Republic, the National Prize of the German Democratic Republic, the Order of Merit of the Federal Republic of Germany, and the German Music Authors' Prize.

== Biography ==
Katzer was born in Habelschwerdt, Lower Silesia (now Bystrzyca Kłodzka, Poland), on 10 January 1935. From 1954 to 1960 he studied piano, music theory, and composition with (amongst others) Rudolf Wagner-Régeny and Ruth Zechlin at the Hanns Eisler Hochschule für Musik in East Berlin, then from 1957 to 1958 he studied in Prague with Karel Janáček. From 1961 to 1963 he was a postgraduate student of Hanns Eisler and Leo Spies at the German Academy of the Arts in Berlin, the last master student of Eisler. In 1963, he became a freelance composer and musician.

From 1976 to 1977 he worked in electronic-music studios in Bratislava and Paris. In 1978 Katzer was elected to membership in the Academy of the Arts in East Berlin. In 1980 he was appointed a professor and subsequently taught a masterclass in composition at the Academy of the Arts until 1991. In 1986 he founded the Studio for Experimental Music, affiliated with the Music Department of the Academy of the Arts, and was its artistic director.

Katzer was a member of the Academy of Arts in East Berlin until 1993, and then a member of the Berlin section of music until his death. He served as vice president of the music section from 1994 to 2003. From 1989 to 1991, he was president of the German Section of the C.I.M.E. (International Confederation of Electroacoustic Music). From 1990 to 2001, he was a presiding member of the Deutscher Musikrat (German Music Council, a member of the International Music Council).

Katzer lived in Zeuthen near Berlin until his death on 7 May 2019; he was 84 years old.

== Compositions ==
Katzer's earlier works owe a great deal to the music of Béla Bartók, Igor Stravinsky, and his teacher, Hanns Eisler. In the late 1960s he came under the influence of Witold Lutosławski and Bernd Alois Zimmermann, departing from conventional tonality and forms. From this point on, his vocabulary included serial, aleatory, and collage techniques, as well as electronic sounds. His compositions included works for chamber ensembles, orchestral works, solo concertos, operas, ballets, puppet plays, and oratorios. His work also encompassed electroacoustical pieces, music for radio dramas, multimedia projects, and projects involving improvised music. His compositions are held by the Saxon State and University Library Dresden, including:

- String Quartet No. 1 (1965)
- Baukasten für Orchester (1972)
- Die Igeltreppe for narrator and 13 instruments, text by Sarah Kirsch (1973)
- Das Land Bum-Bum, opera (1973)
- D-Dur Musikmaschine (Music machine in D major), for orchestra (1973)
- Schwarze Vögel, ballet (1975)
- Szene für Kammerensemble, instrumental theatre (1975)
- Bevor Ariadne kommt, for electronic sounds (1976)
- Concerto for Harpsichord and Wind Quintet (1978)
- Ein neuer Sommernachtstraum, ballet (1979)
- Aide-memoire, for electronic sounds (1983)
- Gastmahl oder über die Liebe, opera, libretto by Gerhard Müller (1987)
- Antigone oder die Stadt, opera, libretto by Gerhard Müller (1989)
- Mein 1989, radio composition (1990)
- Ich bin ein anderer, Hörspiel after Arthur Rimbaud (1990)
- L'homme machine, multimedia scenic action (2000)
- Medea in Korinth, oratorical scenes, libretto by Christa Wolf (after Medea: Stimmen). Premiered on 6 September 2002 at the Konzerthaus Berlin
- Fukujamas Kiste, for electronic sounds (2002)

== Awards ==
- 1976: Art Prize of the German Democratic Republic
- 1981: National Prize of the German Democratic Republic for complete compositions
- 1987: Kunstpreis des FDGB for music from the Free German Trade Union Federation
- 1992: Kulturpreis Schlesien des Landes Niedersachsen
- 1992: Honorary guest of the Villa Massimo
- 1998: Johann-Wenzel-Stamitz-Preis
- 2003: Officer's Cross of the Order of Merit of the Federal Republic of Germany
- 2011: Preis der deutschen Schallplattenkritik
- 2012: German Music Authors' Prize in the category Composition Experimental music
