= Długoszyn =

- Village
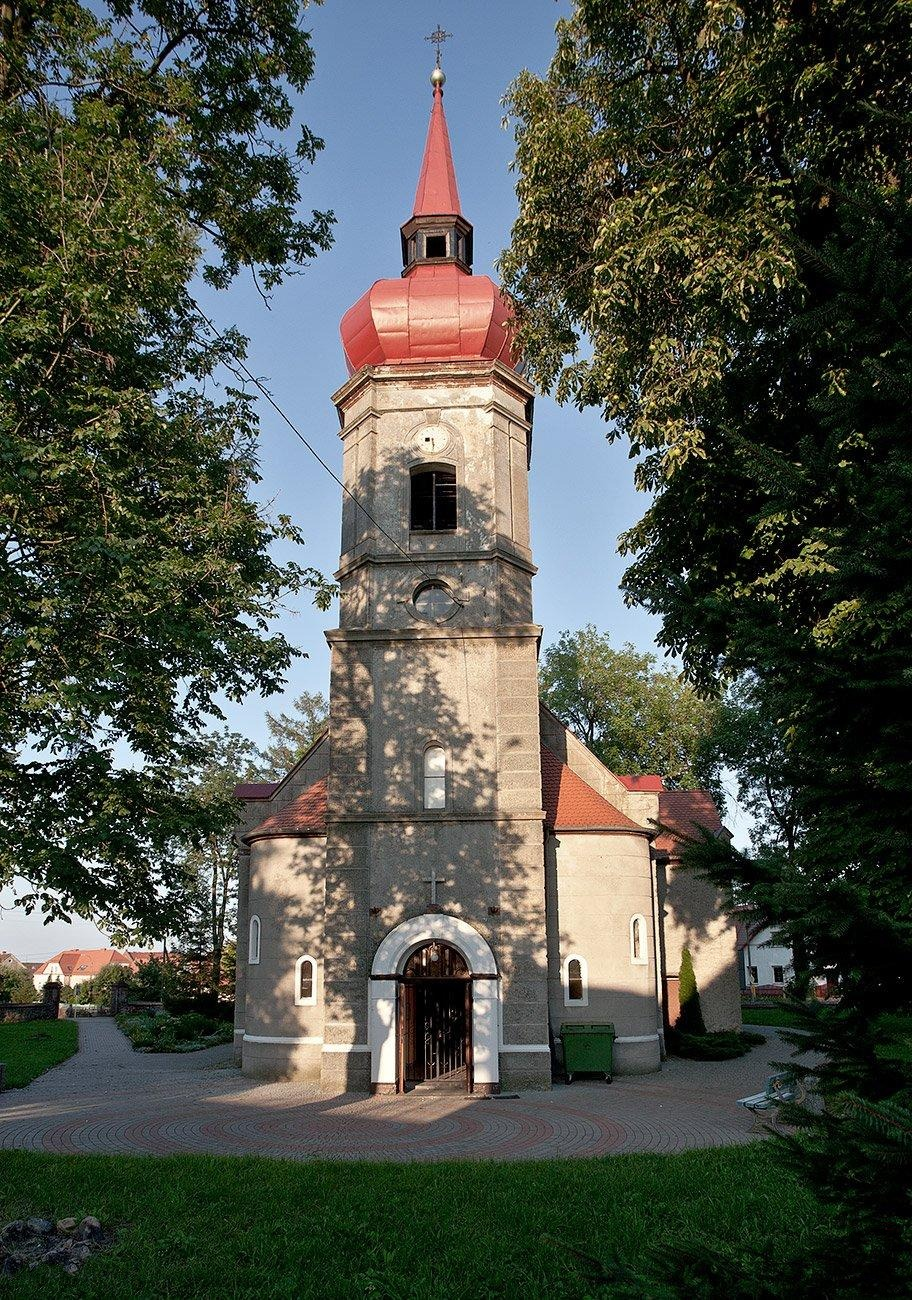
- Local Catholic church

- Location within Poland
- Coordinates: 52°28′N 15°4′E
- Country: Poland
- Voivodeship: Lubusz
- County: Sulęcin
- Gmina: Sulęcin

Długoszyn [dwuˈɡɔʂɨn] is a village in the administrative district of Gmina Sulęcin, within Sulęcin County, Lubusz Voivodeship, in western Poland.
