= Hanns Petersen =

German teacher, opera and pop singer (1927–2006)

- Born: Hanns-Herbert Schulz; 26 June 1927; Weimar, Germany
- Died: 9 June 2006 (aged 78) Dresden, Germany
- Genres: opera; pop
- Occupations: Opera singer, pop singer, vocal teacher
- Instrument: Vocals
- Years active: 1945–2005
- Label: Amiga (record label)

Hanns-Herbert Schulz (26 June 1927 – 9 June 2006), better known as Hanns Petersen, was a German opera singer (baritone), music college teacher and pop singer. He is known for his career in popular music (Schlager), his many operatic performances at the Semperoper and the Deutsches Nationaltheater Weimar and his work as a professor at the Hochschule für Musik Carl Maria von Weber and Hochschule für Musik Franz Liszt, Weimar.

== Career ==
=== Studies and first performances ===
Hanns-Herbert Schulz, the son of Ella Schulz-Schulenburg and Walter Schulz, solo cellist at the German National Theater Weimar and professor at the Leipzig University of Music and director of the Hochschule für Musik Franz Liszt, Weimar, studied the violoncello as a guest student from 1942 to 1944. Thereafter, he studied singing under Hauschild and opera production with Kranz at the Hochschule für Musik Franz Liszt, Weimar from 1945 to 1950. After graduating, he began both his career as a soloist and as an opera singer at the German National Theater Weimar under his real name Hanns-Herbert Schulz and his career as a singer in light entertainment music under the pseudonym Hanns Petersen.

=== 'Schlager' singer Hanns Petersen ===
Hanns Petersen's career began as a singer with the Leipzig Radio Dance Orchestra (Rundfunk-Tanzorchester Leipzig) conducted by Kurt Henkels. Petersen became known through his numerous radio productions, television broadcasts, Amiga recordings and public events. However, first recordings were made on Weimar's provincial radio (Landessender Weimar) as early as 1946. In June 1951 he also took part in the '3. Tag des Rundfunks' as a singer in the Kurt Henkels Orchestra. In the same year he published the popular song Am Samstag Um Vier (On Saturday at Four) with singer Sonja Siewert. Petersen also sang several duets and love songs with the German pop singer Irma Baltuttis. 1959 he ended his career in the Schlager genre.

=== Opera singer Hanns-Herbert Schulz ===
After finishing his studies, Hanns-Herbert Schulz sang at the Deutsches Nationaltheater Weimar from 1952 to 1959 and at the Staatsoper Dresden (Semperoper) from 1959 to 1962, as well as from 1965 to 1969. He became a widely acclaimed opera singer through his performances as Nabucco, Don Giovanni, Kaspar (Der Freischütz) and Eugen Onegin et al. In the meantime (from 1962 to 1965) he was also working as an opera singer at the Opernhaus Leipzig.

==== Dresdner Staatsoper (selection) ====
- 1958 – 1966: Amonasro in Giuseppe Verdi: "Aida" – Staged by Erich Geiger
- 1959 – 1965: King in Carl Orff: „Die Kluge“ – Staged by Erhard Fischer
- 1962 – 1966: Count in Wolfgang Amadeus Mozart: „Die Hochzeit des Figaro" – Inszenierung von Erich Geiger
- 1963 – 1969: Guglielmo in W. A. Mozart: Così fan tutte – Staged by Erich Geiger
- 1964 – 1966: Don Giovanni in W. A. Mozart: „Don Giovanni" – Staged by Erich Geiger
- 1960 – 1962: Schischkoff in Leoš Janáček: „Aus einem Totenhaus" – Staged by Erich Geiger
- 1960 – 1968: Narrator in W. A. Mozart: „Die Zauberflöte" (The Magic Flute) – Staged by Erhard Fischer
- 1962 – 1963, 1967: Konrad Nightingale in Richard Wagner: „Die Meistersinger von Nürnberg" – Staged by Heinz Arnold
- 1960 – 1965: Scarpia in Giacomo Puccini: „Tosca" – Staged by Erich Geiger
- 1964: Kaspar in Carl Maria von Weber: „Der Freischütz" – Staged by Johannes Wieke
- 1959 – 1964: Escamillo in Georges Bizet: "Carmen" – Staged by Erich Geiger
- 1964 – 1968: Count in Richard Strauss Capriccio – Staged by Erich Witte

==== Berliner Staatsoper (selection of roles) ====
- 1956: Worker Gil in Rudolf Wagner-Régeny: „Der Günstling" (The Favourite)
- 1962: Scarpia in Giacomo Puccini: „Tosca"
- 1967: Count in Wolfgang Amadeus Mozart: „Die Hochzeit des Figaro"

==== Deutsches Nationaltheater Weimar (selection of roles) ====
- Hans Foltz / and also Kothner in Richard Wagner: „Die Meistersinger von Nürnberg"
- King Heinrich in Richard Wagner: „Lohengrin"
- Count / and also Wolfram von Eschenbach in Richard Wagner: „Tannhäuser"
- Fafner in Richard Wagner: „Siegfried"
- Hunding in Richard Wagner: „Die Walküre"
- Fasolt in Richard Wagner: „Das Rheingold"
- Hagen in Richard Wagner: „Götterdämmerung"
- Amfortas in Richard Wagner: „Parsifal"
- Doctor Grenvil in Giuseppe Verdi: „La traviata"

==== Opera House Leipzig (selection of roles) ====
- Wolfram von Eschenbach in Richard Wagner: „Tannhäuser"
- Prince Igor in Prince Igor – produced by Joachim Herz (1959)

=== University teaching position ===
==== Hochschule für Musik Carl Maria von Weber ====
In 1970 he was instrumental in setting up the popular music departments at the music academies in Dresden and Weimar, where he began teaching singing. In 1986 he received his professorship in Dresden. Many well-known German singers, such as Veronica Fischer, Reinhard Fißler, Heinz-Jürgen Gottschalk, Ike Moriz, Ute Freudenberg, Brigitte Stefan and Tom Luca studied singing under Schulz. He taught here for a total of over thirty years until shortly before his death in 2006.

==== Hochschule für Musik Franz Liszt Weimar ====
Schulz taught from 1968 as a lecturer, from 1970 as a singing teacher and from 1983 to 1992 as professor for singing in the dance and popular music department at the Hochschule für Musik Franz Liszt, Weimar. He remained connected to the university as a lecturer until 1994.

== Discography ==
=== Song titles (selection) ===
All published by Amiga (record label):

- Addio amore (Arden, Harper, Pelosi)
- Addio Donna Gracia – 1951 (Friedrich Wilhelm Rust)
- Adelheid – 1951 (Willy Berking, Willi Tom Stassar)
- Am Samstag um vier (mit Sonja Siewert) – 1951 (Hans-Joachim Schulze, Bully Buhlan)
- Andalusische Märchen – 1953 (Erwin Halletz, André Hoff)
- Cordoba (Rudi Bohn, Helmuth Schattel)
- Denk´ an mich −1953 (Gerhard Honig, Willi Mok)
- Dolores – 1951 (Michael Jary, Bruno Balz)
- Dreh dich noch einmal um – 1953 (Heino Gaze, Bruno Balz)
- Du hast so wunderschöne blaue Augen – 1953 (Willy Berking, Heinz Woezel)
- Ein Musikus, ein Musikus (Heino Gaze)
- Geflüster – 1953 (John Schonberger)
- Hernando's Hideaway – 1956 (Jerry Ross, Richard Adler)
- Ich build´ mir ein – 1954 (TV-Produktion)
- Ich habe heut´ nacht eine große Dummheit gemacht – 1953 (Rudolf Burkhardt, Carl-Ulrich Blecher)
- Ich lad´ dich ein, Cherie – 1954 (J. Marsala, Heino Gaze)
- Ich möcht´ mit dir spazieren geh´n (Günter Oppenheimer, Helmut Kießling)
- Jambalaya – 1953 (Hank Williams, Kurt Feltz)
- Jawoll, das ist Musik – 1953 (Alfred Jack, Carl-Ulrich Blecher)
- Je vous aime (Benny de Weille, Werner Loeper)
- Kleiner Bär von Berlin (Botho Lucas, H. Hinze Kriegler)
- Lass die Sorgen Sorgen sein (E. Buder, H. Hemes)
- Leg´ deine Hand in meine Hand (mit Irma Baltuttis) -1953 (Burger, S. Schmidt)
- Leise weht der Wind – 1953 (Siegfried Mai, Johannes Kretzschmar)
- Madeleine – 1954 (TV-Produktion)
- Noch vor Tag (E. P. Hoyer, Arnold Bormann)
- O, Pepita – 1952 (Harry Frank, Alfredo Zmigrod)
- Reiterlied – 1951 (Sfasmann, Hans-Georg Herde, M.Koch)
- Schütt die Sorgen in ein Gläschen Wein – 1953 (Gerhard Winkler, Erich Meder)
- Seemannsgarn – 1953 (Walter Eichenberg, Johannes Kretzschmar)
- Singe, Wind – 1952 (Isaac Dunajewskij, Lebedew-Kumatsch)
- Spatz und Spätzin (mit Irma Baltuttis) – 1953 (Helmut Nier)
- Süße kleine Dorothee (Gerhard Honig, Mok)
- Tamingo – 1956 (Ernst Peter Hoyer, Arnold Bormann)
- Verlieb´ dich nicht am Nordpol – 1950 (Michael Jary, Bruno Balz)
- Wenn du wüsstest, ach, wie ich dich liebe (mit Irma Baltuttis) – 1951 (Rolf Zimmermann, Günter Klein)
- Wir sind füreinander bestimmt (mit Irma Baltuttis) – 1951 (Gerhard Winkler, Hase)

== Literature ==
- Bernd Meyer-Rähnitz, Frank Oehme, Joachim Schütte: Die "Ewige Freundin" – Eterna und Amiga; Die Discographie der Schellackplatten (1947–1961). Albis International Bibliophilen-Verlag, Dresden/Ústí 2006, ISBN 80-86971-10-4
- Siegfried Trzoß: Schlager-Geschichte(n) des Ostens. Band 1 bis 3. Aperçu-Verlag, Berlin, ISBN 978-3-938810-03-3, ISBN 9783938810040, ISBN 9783938810026
- R. Sudmann: Popmusik in Studiengängen deutscher Hochschulen. In: Handbuch Jugend und Musik / Dieter Baacke (Hrsg.), Opladen (Leske und Budrich), ISBN 9783810015433
- Eike Moriz: Darstellung verschiedener stimmbildnerischer Arbeitsmethoden und deren vergleichende Betrachtung. Blurb Bücher Deutschland, 2020, ISBN 978-1-715-40557-1
- Werner P. Seiferth: Richard Wagner in der DDR – Versuch einer Bilanz. Sax Verlag, 2012, ISBN 978-3-86729-096-8 (ISBN 3867290962)
- D. J. Aitken, International Handbook of Universities 1981, Eighth Edition, Walter de Gruyter GmbH & Co KG, 18 May 2020, page 414
- Musikstudium, Musikpraxis : Beitr. zu Theorie u. Praxis d. Erziehung u. Ausbildung von Musikern u. Musikpädagogen in d. DDR / hrsg. von Hans John u. Günther Stephan, Hanns-Herbert Schulz, Zur Hochschulausbildung von Gesangssolisten der Tanz- und Unterhaltungsmusik, page 299, ISBN 978-3-7333-0021-0
