= Siegfried Vogel =

German operatic bass (born 1937)

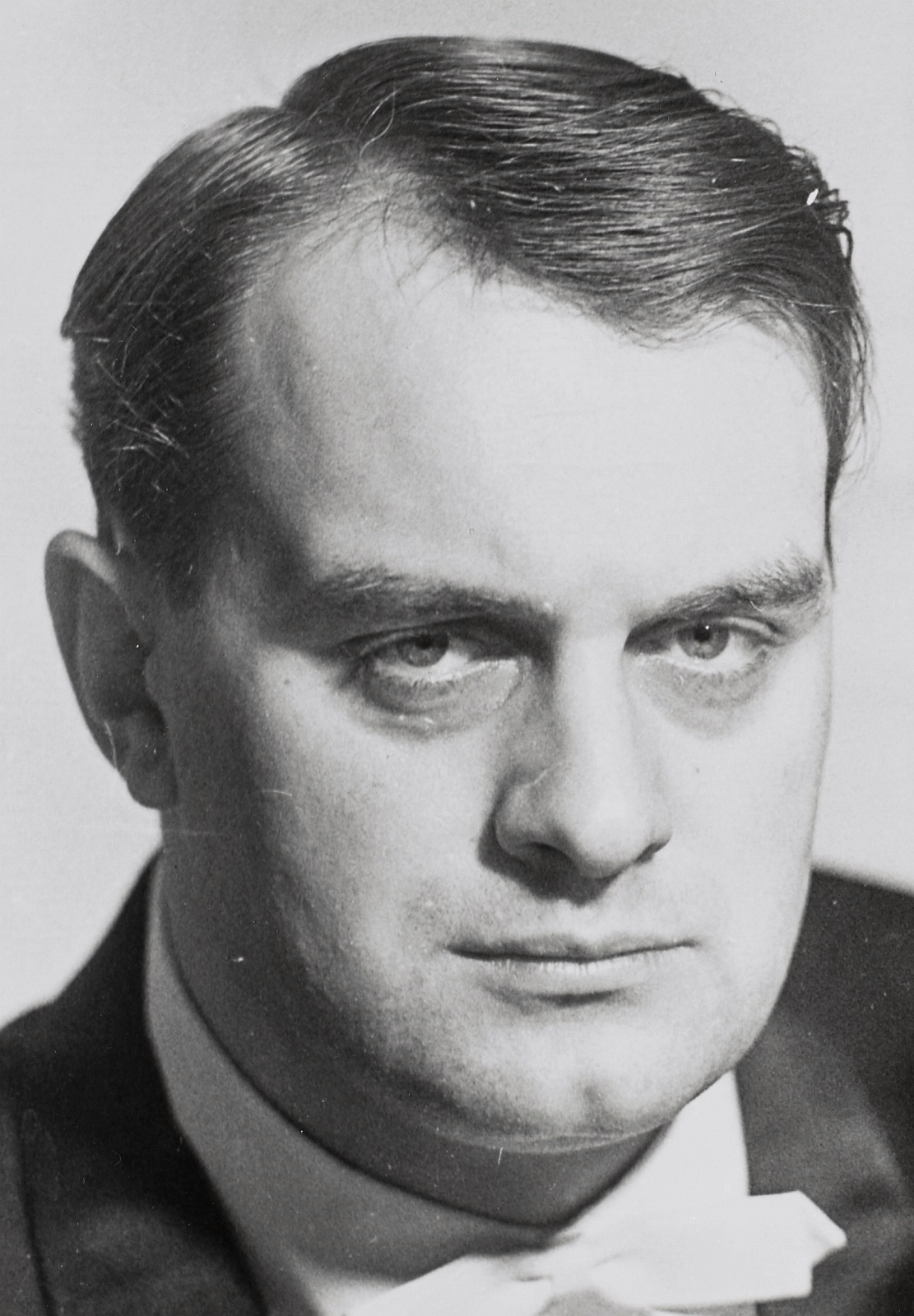
- Vogel in 1967
- Born: 6 March 1937 (age 88); Chemnitz, Germany
- Education: Musikhochschule Dresden
- Occupation: Operatic bass
- Organizations: Berlin State Opera

Siegfried Vogel (born 6 March 1937) is a German operatic bass. Based at the Berlin State Opera, he performed internationally at major opera houses and festivals, including the Salzburg Festival and the Bayreuth Festival. He began in Mozart roles, but expanded his repertoire, including world premieres of operas.

== Life and career ==
Born in Chemnitz, Vogel took singing lessons in Dresden from age 18, followed by studies at the Musikhochschule Dresden, continued in the opera studio of the Staatsoper Dresden. He made his debut there as Zizell in Adolphe Adam's Si j'étais roi in 1959, and was successful in Mozart roles. He became a member of the Berlin State Opera in 1965, where he appeared in Mozart roles again, the title role of Le nozze di Figaro, Leporello in Don Giovanni and Don Alfonso in Così fan tutte. He also performed as Rocco in Beethoven's Fidelio, as Kaspar in Weber's Der Freischütz, as Hunding in Wagner's Die Walküre, as Basilio in Rossini's Il barbiere di Siviglia and as Escamillo in Bizet's Carmen, among others. He took part in the world premieres of Paul Dessau's Lanzelot in 1969, of Alan Bush's Joe Hill in 1970, and of Ernst Hermann Meyer's Reiter in der Nacht in 1973. He performed at the Komische Oper Berlin, in 1983 the title role of Mussorgsky's Boris Godunov, and in 1991 the role of Morosus in Die schweigsame Frau by Richard Strauss.

He sang at the Salzburg Festival, in 1979 as Ochs in Der Rosenkavalier by Richard Strauss, from 1979 to 1982 in his Ariadne auf Naxos, and in 1980 the role of Luther in a concert performance of Krenek's Karl V.. He appeared at the Bayreuth Festival from 1982 to 1989, as Heinrich in Lohengrin, as Biterolf in Tannhäuser, as Fasolt in Das Rheingold and as Titurel in Parsifal.

He appeared worldwide, including tours of the Staatsoper Berlin. He sang at the Bolshoi Theatre in Moscow, at the Paris Opera, at the Opéra national du Rhin in Strasbourg, in Brussels, Vienna, at La Scala in Milan, in Venice, Stockholm, Helsinki, Amsterdam, Budapest, Cairo, Nice, and at the Teatro Massimo in Palermo. In Lausanne, he appeared in 1983 as Hans Sachs in Wagner's Die Meistersinger von Nürnberg and as Ochs in Der Rosenkavalier. He made his debut at the Metropolitan Opera in 1986 as Hunding in Die Walküre.

Vogel was also regarded as an outstanding concert and oratorio singer, especially in music by Johann Sebastian Bach and George Frideric Handel.
