= Siegfried Kurz =

German conductor and composer (1930–2023)

- Born: 18 July 1930; Dresden, Saxony, Germany
- Died: 8 January 2023 (aged 92); Dresden, Germany
- Occupations: Conductor; composer; academic teacher
- Organizations: Semperoper; Hochschule für Musik Carl Maria von Weber
- Children: 1
- Awards: National Prize of the GDR

Siegfried Kurz (18 July 1930 – 8 January 2023) was a German conductor, composer and academic. He influenced the musical scene of Dresden, as the conductor of the Semperoper for three decades, and a professor of conducting at the Hochschule für Musik Carl Maria von Weber. He conducted the world premiere of Udo Zimmermann's Levins Mühle.

== Life ==
Born on 18 July 1930 in Dresden, Kurz began his musical career as a trumpeter. From 1945, he studied composition (with Fidelio F. Finke), and orchestral conducting and trumpet at the Academy of Music and Theatre in his home town. Already in 1949, a year before completing his studies, he was given the direction of the drama music at the Staatsschauspiel Dresden. He remained in this position until 1960, then moved to the Staatsoper Dresden; he began as Kapellmeister, was promoted to Staatskapellmeister in 1964, to Generalmusikdirektor in 1971 and finally to executive musical director (geschäftsführender musikalischer Oberleiter) in 1976. In 1983, he ended his permanent engagement at the Staatsoper Dresden but remained associated with the house as a conductor. From 1984, he was Kapellmeister at the Staatsoper Unter den Linden.

Kurz was awarded several important prizes, such as the National Prize of the GDR (both in 1976 and 1988). Kurz, who lived in Niederlößnitz, part of Radebeul, was awarded the Art Prize of Radebeul in 2001.

=== Composer ===
Kurz appeared as a composer mainly from the 1950s to the 1970s; later his duties as a conductor predominated. The focus of his work is on orchestral compositions. He first wrote in a neoclassicist, playful-musical idiom. In addition to the influence of Paul Hindemith, echoes of jazz music can also be detected, for example in the Trumpet Concerto, probably his best-known work. The concerto was part of school education.

Towards the end of the 1950s, Kurz began to intensify his musical expression. He leaned more towards Béla Bartók and experimented with the possibilities of the twelve-tone technique (symphonies). Kurz treated twelve-tone rows more as stylistic devices, dealt with them freely and used a freitonal harmony. Further characteristics of his style are Counterpointish design, powerfully emphasised rhythm, vitality and freshness. His mature works combine serious and thoughtful to exuberant and cheerful passages in the sense of an optimistic attitude.

=== Conductor ===
Particularly as conductor of the Staatsoper Dresden and Staatskapelle, Kurz was one of the most important personalities of the Dresden music scene in the second half of the 20th century. He conducted numerous opera performances, some of which were also released on record. His repertoire was extraordinarily broad: in addition to the standard German repertoire from Mozart to Richard Strauss, it included works from the Italian and Slavic cultural areas. He collaborated with stage directors including Ruth Berghaus. Kurz conducted as a guest internationally, at the Leipzig Opera Wagner's Tristan und Isolde, in Paris Wagner's Das Rheingold, Der Rosenkavalier by Richard Strauss in Venice and Buenos Aires, Wagner's Parsifal and Prokofiev's Der feurige Engel at the Oper Bonn, and Weber's Der Freischütz in Japan.

Kurz was strongly committed to 20th century operas. The production of Schönberg's Moses und Aron, directed by Harry Kupfer, found international recognition. He conducted Berg's Wozzeck, Paul Dessau's Die Verurteilung des Lukullus and Lanzelot, Orff's Antigonae, Bartók's Herzog Blaubarts Burg, and the world premiere of Udo Zimmermann's Levins Mühle in 1972.

=== Teaching ===
Kurz taught at the Hochschule für Musik Carl Maria von Weber from 1976, and became a professor in 1979. Among his students were Michael Güttler, Martin Hoff, Hans-Christoph Rademann and Eckehard Stier.

=== Personal life ===
Kurz was married to a former harpist; the couple had a daughter. He was a passionate mountaineer.

Kurz died on 8 January 2023, aged 92, in Dresden after a long illness.

== Work ==
Kurz's works are held by the German National Library, including:

Orchestral works

- Symphony No. 1, Op. 28 (1958)
- Symphony No. 2, Op. 29 (1960)
- Sinfonia piccola, Op. 24 (1953)
- Heiteres Vorspiel for orchestra (1952)
- Konzertante Musik for orchestra (1953)
- Tänzerische Suite, Op. 25 (1955)
- Orchestermusik, Op. 30 (1960)
- Orchestervariationen, Op. 33 (1965)
- Sonatine für Orchester, Op. 34 (1967)
- Musik für Blechbläser, Pauken und Streicher, Op. 36 (1969)
- Aufenthalt auf Erden, Reflexionen für Orchester after Pablo Neruda, Op. 38 (1975)
- Incidental music

Concertos

- Piano Concerto, Op. 32 (1964)
- Divertimento für Klavier und Streichorchester, Op. 15 (1950)
- Violin Concerto, Op. 26 (1955)
- Kammerkonzert für Bläserquintett und Streichorchester, Op. 31 (1961)
- Concerto for Trumpet and Strings, Op. 23 (1953)
- Horn Concerto, Op. 37 (1972/73)

Vocal music

- Jeff und Andy, musical (1970)

Chamber music

- String Quartet No. 1, Op. 27 (1957)
- String Quartet No. 2, Op. 35 (1968)
- Sonatine für sieben Blechbläser, Op. 18 (1952)
- Wind Quintet, Op. 12 (1950)
