= Erich Witte =

German operatic tenor (1911–2008)

- Born: 19 March 1911; Graudenz, West Prussia
- Died: 30 June 2008 (aged 97); Berlin, Germany
- Occupations: Operatic tenor; Opera director
- Organisation: Berlin State Opera
- Title: Kammersänger

Erich Witte (19 March 1911 – 30 June 2008) was a German stage actor, operatic tenor and opera director. He was based for almost five decades at the Berlin State Opera, and performed leading roles at major opera houses in Europe and at the Metropolitan opera. He participated in world premieres, including Louise Talma's Die Alkestiade and Alan Bush's Joe Hill.

== Life ==
Born in Graudenz, West Prussia, Witte grew up in Bremen from 1920 and first became an actor and répétiteur. At the Bremen conservatory, he then studied singing with the bass-baritone Philipp Kraus. In 1930, at the age of 19, he made his stage debut at the Theater Bremen as Nando in d'Albert's Tiefland. In 1931 he was engaged as an actor at the Stadttheater Bremerhaven, but soon took on singing roles such as Châteauneuf in Zar und Zimmermann and Jaquino in Fidelio. From 1932 to 1937 he was again in the ensemble of the Bremen theatre.

In 1937, he joined the Theater Wiesbaden, where he distinguished himself as a tenor buffo. In 1936 and 1937, he made guest appearances at the Monte Carlo Opera as Mime in Wagner's Der Ring des Nibelungen, in 1938 and 1940 at the Vienna State Opera and also at the Teatro Colón in Buenos Aires (1938). In the 1938/39 season, Witte was engaged at the Metropolitan Opera in New York City for 47 performances, including as Froh in the Ring cycle and as the Fool in Mussorgsky's Boris Godunov. From 1940 to 1942, he sang at the opera house in Breslau, where he took part in the world premiere of Hans Stieber's Der Dombaumeister on 7 February 1942. From 1941, he belonged to the ensemble of the Berlin State Opera, where he appeared in the 1944 first production of Sutermeister's Romeo und Julia, as Romeo alongside Maria Cebotari. He also performed as Pinkerton in Puccini's Madama Butterfly alongside Erna Berger, as Richard in Verdi's Un ballo in maschera, and as Laca in Janáček's Jenůfa. In 1943 and 1944, he appeared at the Bayreuth Festival as David in Die Meistersinger von Nürnberg, and as Loge in Das Rheingold in 1952 and 1953.

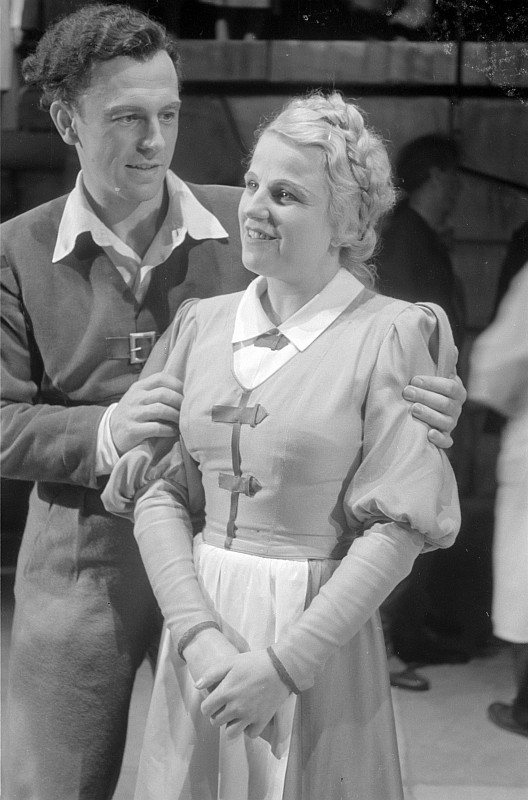
Witte as Jaquino in the 1945 Fidelio, with Irma Beilke as Marzelline

In the first opera performance in Berlin after World War II, on 4 September 1945, Witte was Jaquino in Fidelio. In 1950, he performed the title role of Wagner's Parsifal at the Berlin State Opera. He appeared in the title role of Britten's Peter Grimes at the Städtische Oper Berlin in 1947, when the opera was first performed in Berlin, alongside Elisabeth Grümmer as Ellen Orford. On 4 September 1955, he performed in the opening performance of the restored Staatsoper Unter den Linden as Stolzing in Wagner's Die Meistersinger von Nürnberg. He directed this work at the Royal Opera House in London in 1957, and stepped in on short notice to also sing Stolzing, in English.

His roles at the Staatsoper also included Verdi's Otello, Florestan in Fidelio, Bacchus in Ariadne auf Naxos by Richard Strauss, Cavaradossi in Puccini's Tosca, Hoffmann, Don José in Bizet's Carmen and Loge.

From 1961 to 1964 he was opera director at the Oper Frankfurt where he appeared in the world premiere of Louise Talma's Die Alkestiade. He then returned to his Berlin home, where his repertoire shifted to character tenor roles including Shostakovich's Die Nase, Harry McRae in Alan Bush's Joe Hill in the opera's world premiere in 1970 and Joachim Werzlau Meister Röckle (1976). He made his last stage appearances at the age of eighty.

In 1951, he was active as a director for the first time with Richard Mohaupt's Bremer Stadtmusikanten at the Admiralspalast. At the new house Unter den Linden, he directed Wagner's Tristan und Isolde, Lohengrin and the Ring cycle, with Franz Konwitschny as conductor, leaning on the Wieland Wagner's Bayreuth style. He also directed Daphne by Richard Strauss, conducted by Otmar Suitner.

From 1970, Witte was also a lecturer in vocal studies at the Hochschule für Musik Hanns Eisler Berlin. On the occasion of his retirement in 1991, the Staatsoper awarded him, on top of the earlier title Kammersänger, an honorary membership.

Witte died in Berlin aged 97, only a few days after the death of his wife Josefa, a former member of the Berlin State Opera Ballet.

== Recordings ==
Most of the cast details can be found on entries in the Deutsche Nationalbibliothek catalogue.

- Der Rosenkavalier, recording of the Metropolitan Opera New York 1939, Naxos OCLC 1040409404
- Die Meistersinger von Nürnberg, recording from 1943/44, Preiser Records 1994 OCLC 164820677
- Abu Hassan, recording from 1944, Line Music 2003 OCLC 985568723
- Hänsel und Gretel, recording from 1944, Preiser Records 1996 OCLC 778701533
- Das Rheingold (Wagner), recording from the 1952 Bayreuth Festival, Line Music 2003 OCLC 1183615919
- Das Rheingold (Wagner), recording from the 1953 Bayreuth Festival, Line Music 2004 OCLC 1183772332
- Puntila, Deutsche Staatsoper 1968, Berlin Classics 1994 OCLC 875608287
- Einstein, Deutsche Staatsoper 1978, Edel 1996 OCLC 1183607399
