= Cheryl Studer =

American dramatic soprano (born 1955)

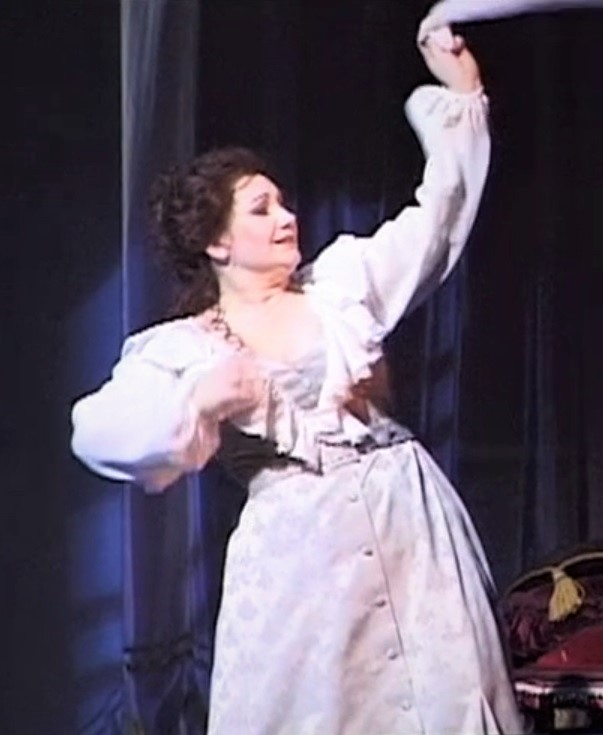
Studer as Rosalinde in Die Fledermaus, Bavarian State Opera, Munich, 1997

Cheryl Studer (born October 24, 1955) is an American soprano who has sung at many of the world's foremost opera houses. Studer has performed more than eighty roles ranging from the dramatic repertoire to roles more commonly associated with lyric sopranos and coloratura sopranos, and, in her late stage, mezzo-sopranos. She is particularly known for her interpretations of the works of Richard Strauss and Richard Wagner.

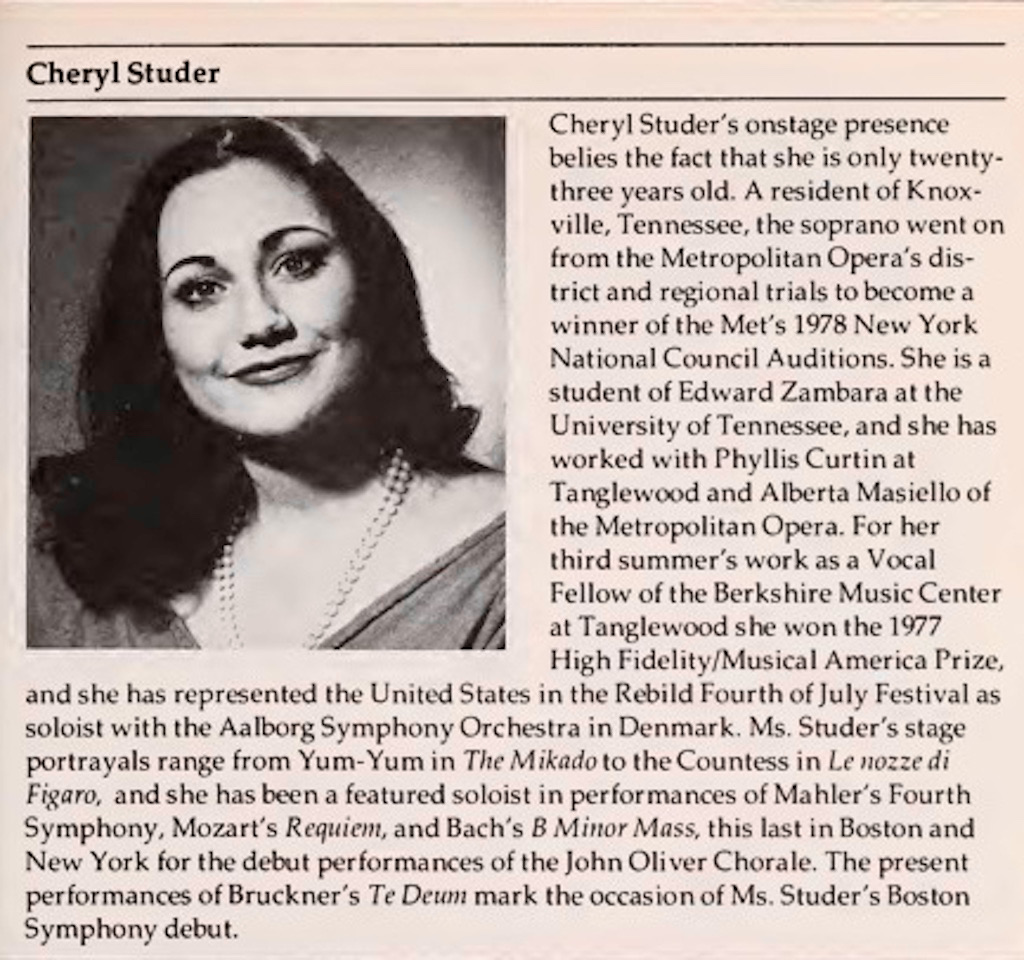
Debut with Boston Symphony Orchestra, January 16, 1979

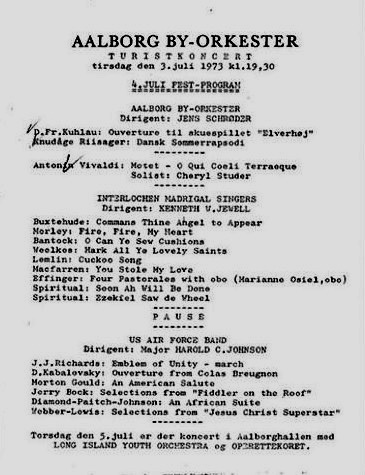
Early concert program, Aalborg, Denmark, 1973

== Early life and education ==
Studer was born in Midland, Michigan, to Carl W. Studer and Elizabeth (born Smith) Studer, as one of three children.

She studied piano and viola as a child, and began voice lessons at age 12 with Gwendolyn Pike, a local opera singer and voice teacher.

She attended Herbert Henry Dow High School, then transferred to the Interlochen Arts Academy for her junior and senior years and graduated from there in 1974. Following high school, Studer studied at the Oberlin Conservatory of Music but left the program after a year, deciding to move with her family to Tennessee. She continued her studies at the University of Tennessee at Knoxville, and graduated with a Bachelor's degree in Vocal Performance in 1979. Studer won several awards and competitions during this time, including the High Fidelity/Musical America Award in 1977 and the Metropolitan Opera National Council Auditions in 1978.

In the summer of 1979, Studer attended a course for foreign students on the art of the German Lied at the Schubert Institute in Baden bei Wien, Austria. In this program, Studer's teachers included Irmgard Seefried, Brigitte Fassbaender, and Hans Hotter. Hotter persuaded Studer to remain in Europe to study further with him at the Hochschule für Musik und darstellende Kunst, Vienna. Studer studied with Hotter for one year before launching out on her professional career. In 1979, she won the Franz-Schubert-Institut-Preis for excellence in Lied interpretation.

== Vocation ==
=== 1980s ===
In 1981, Studer was hired as a permanent member of the Bavarian State Opera by Wolfgang Sawallisch. She remained with the company for two consecutive seasons, singing mostly minor roles in their productions. Her lead roles at the Bavarian State Opera included the title role in Carl Maria von Weber's Euryanthe and Mařenka The Bartered Bride. It was while working with the Bavarian State Opera that Studer was first encouraged to study the works of Richard Wagner and the dramatic soprano repertoire. Up to this point she had focused mostly on the bel canto repertoire, with her only foray into German repertoire up to that point being through Lieder. She made her professional opera debut with the company as Helmwige in Wagner's Die Walküre.

At the end of the 1981–82 season, she left the Munich ensemble to join the Staatstheater Darmstadt for two seasons. In the spring of 1983, Studer took her first major role as Violetta in Verdi's La traviata with the Staatstheater Braunschweig. This was followed by two more important roles the following summer: Irene in Wagner's Rienzi and Drola in Wagner's Die Feen, under the direction of Wolfgang Sawallisch at the Bavarian State Opera's Summer Music Festival. In 1984, Studer left the Staatstheater Darmstadt to become a permanent member of the Deutsche Oper Berlin ensemble. She stayed with the company for two full seasons. She made her US opera debut the same year with the Lyric Opera of Chicago as Micaëla in Carmen.

In 1985, Studer performed as Elisabeth in Wagner's Tannhäuser under Giuseppe Sinopoli at the Bayreuth Festival. Positive reviews of this performance quickly led Studer to more prominent leading roles.

In 1986, Studer made her debut at the Liceu as Freia in Wagner's Das Rheingold and her debut at Opéra de Paris as Pamina in Mozart's Die Zauberflöte. That same year, she made her debut with the San Francisco Opera as Eva in Wagner's Die Meistersinger. In 1987, Studer made her debut with the Royal Opera House, Covent Garden, as Elisabeth in Wagner's Tannhäuser and her debut at La Scala as Donna Anna in Mozart's Don Giovanni. In 1988, Studer made her Metropolitan Opera debut as Micaëla in Bizet's Carmen. That same year she returned to La Scala to perform the role of Mathilde in Rossini's William Tell. She sang Agathe in Carl Maria von Weber's Der Freischütz at the Théâtre Musical de Paris.

In 1989, she made her Vienna State Opera and Salzburg Festival debuts playing the same role, Chrysothemis in Richard Strauss' Elektra. That same year, Studer received the Grand Prix du Disque – Prix Maria Callas. Also in 1989, she returned to La Scala to perform the role of La Duchesse Hélène in Verdi's I vespri siciliani and made her debut with the Opera Company of Philadelphia in the title role of Donizetti's Lucia di Lammermoor.

=== 1990s ===
In 1990, Studer returned to the Metropolitan Opera to sing the role of Donna Anna in Mozart's Don Giovanni. That same year, Studer sang the role of Elsa in Richard Wagner's Lohengrin at the Vienna State Opera. In 1991, Studer performed two more roles at the Met, Elettra in Mozart's Idomeneo and Violetta in Verdi's La traviata. She sang the role of Gilda in act 3 of Verdi's Rigoletto at the Metropolitan Opera's 25th Anniversary Gala, opposite Luciano Pavarotti and Leo Nucci. In 1990, she also sang Odabella in Verdi's Attila at La Scala and Countess Almaviva in Mozart's Le nozze di Figaro at the Vienna State Opera.

In 1995, she sang the role of Princess von Werdenberg in Richard Strauss' Der Rosenkavalier for the first time at the Salzburg Festival. Also in 1995, Studer appeared in concert with her hometown orchestra, the Midland Symphony Orchestra, in Midland, Michigan, during the orchestra's 60th anniversary season. In 1996, Studer sang the same role at the Vienna State Opera. That same year, Studer returned to the Royal Opera to sing the title role of Richard Strauss' Arabella and revisited the title role in Aida opposite Waltraud Meier as Amneris in performances at the Bavarian State Opera. She sang Leonore in Beethoven's Fidelio at the Salzburg Festival in 1997 conducted by Sir Georg Solti.

In 1998, she sang Rosalinde in Die Fledermaus and Sieglinde in Die Walküre at the Bavarian State Opera. That same year she also sang Primadonna/Ariadne in Strauss' Ariadne auf Naxos at the Munich Nationaltheater. Also in 1998, she sang Senta in Der fliegende Holländer at the Bayreuth Festival. She reprised the role there in 1999.

In July 1998, she sang a Liederabend for the Richard Wagner Society at the Markgräfliches Opernhaus (Margravial or Margrave's Opera House) in Bayreuth celebrating the 250th anniversary of the house. During the late 1990s, Studer had a period of vocal problems that led to the Bavarian State Opera canceling her contracts in 1998, but after a brief time off the stage, her performances indicated a return to form and the Bavarian State Opera renewed her contract for fourteen more performances.

Studer sang excerpts from all three acts of Tristan und Isolde in Gießen, Germany (in 1999).

=== 2000s ===
In 2000 Studer returned to the Metropolitan Opera to sing the role of Princess von Werdenberg (the Marschallin) in Richard Strauss' Der Rosenkavalier. That same year, Studer sang the title role of Richard Strauss' Arabella at the Zürich Opera. She also filled in as a last minute Sieglinde in Die Walküre at the Bayreuth Festival substituting for an ailing Waltraud Meier.

In 2000, she also sang Richard Strauss' Four Last Songs with the Berlin Philharmonic conducted by David Zinman substituting for an ailing Claudio Abbado. She also sang the Walküre Brünnhilde' in concert in Budapest with the Budapest Festival Orchestra under the direction of Iván Fischer. In February 2001, Studer sang the role of the Kaiserin (Empress) in Richard Strauss' Die Frau ohne Schatten at the Dresden Semperoper conducted by Giuseppe Sinopoli. She revisited the role at the Vienna State Opera in 2002 in the Robert Carsen production. Around this time, Studer also sang back-to-back performances of the Kaiserin and the Marschallin at the Semperoper conducted by Dietfried Bernet. In June 2001, Studer sang Elisabeth in performances of Werner Herzog's production of Richard Wagner's Tannhäuser at the Theatro Municipal do Rio de Janeiro, Brazil.

Studer can be heard singing the "Ave Maria" from Verdi's Otello in the soundtrack to the 2001 Hollywood film, O.

In February 2002 she made a rare U.S. appearance singing Isolde's "Liebestod" with the Indianapolis Symphony.

In January 2003, Studer sang the soprano part in Beethoven's Symphony No. 9 in Berlin during UNESCO's official designation of the symphony's manuscript as Memory of the World.

Also in 2003, she sang her final Sentas in Der fliegende Holländer in May at the Deutsche Oper Berlin and she gave a Liederabend "In Memoriam Maria Callas" in Athens, Greece, with pianist Charles Spencer, featuring songs and Lieder by Verdi, Wagner, Barber, Richard Strauss, and Copland.

In October 2005, Studer sang the role of Sieglinde in Richard Wagner's first-ever Ring Cycle in China, at Beijing's Poly Theatre. The cycle was produced by Stephen Lawless for the Staatstheater Nürnberg and the performances were conducted by Philippe Auguin. In November 2005 it was reported, but never confirmed, that Studer had suffered a mild heart attack, forcing her to cancel a number of scheduled concerts in Spain.

In June 2007, Studer gave a series of Masterclasses and an all-Richard Strauss Lieder recital with pianist Semyon Skigin in St. Petersburg, Russia. In August 2007, also with pianist Semyon Skigin, she sang an all-Richard Strauss Lieder recital at Villa Wahnfried, Bayreuth. In February 2008, Studer gave a Lieder recital at Teatro Villamarta in Jerez de la Frontera, Spain with pianist Jonathan Alder, featuring Lieder by Schumann, Brahms, Mahler, and Richard Strauss. Later that year in October 2008, Studer gave another Lieder recital at Drake University with pianist Nicholas Roth, featuring songs and Lieder by Rossini, Ravel, Massenet, Albéniz, Brahms, Barber, and Richard Strauss.

In November 2008, she gave another recital in Germany with Dutch pianist Fred Oldenburg featuring Lieder by Schumann, Brahms, Mahler, and Richard Strauss. In August 2009, Studer sang Richard Wagner's Wesendonck Lieder in Berlin, Germany as part of the short-lived Berlin International Music Festival. Michael Wendeberg conducted the Festival orchestra.

=== 2010–present ===
On July 9, 2010, Studer made her directorial debut in a new production of Rossini's Il barbiere di Siviglia at the Bayerische Kammeroper in Würzburg, Germany.

In May 2011, she won the Terras sam Sombra International Prize. Later that year, in November 2011, she appeared in concert in Nuremberg and Antwerp, Belgium, with the Nuremberg Symphony Orchestra and its Chief Music Director, Alexander Shelley. The all-Wagner concerts, also featuring Belgian bass-baritone Wilfried Van den Brande, were recorded and released as part of the orchestra's "Nürnberger Symphoniker Live" series.

Studer has begun a transition into a lower voice range. In December 2011 she appeared as Gertrud in performances of Engelbert Humperdinck's Hänsel und Gretel at the Hamburg State Opera. She revisited the role in 2013, also in Hamburg. In 2012 she was a recipient of the Ovation Award by the Interlochen Center for the Arts.

In 2014, she played Adelaide in Richard Strauss' Arabella at the Hamburg State Opera. Also in 2014, she presided over the 38th International Maria Callas Grand Prix for Opera to be held in Athens, Greece.

In October 2016, Studer sang the Overseer/Confidant (Die Vertraute/Die Aufseherin) in the late Patrice Chéreau's production of Richard Strauss' Elektra at the Staatsoper Berlin, conducted by Daniel Barenboim. She revisited the roles in June 2022, October 2023 and January/February 2025, again at the Staatsoper Berlin, in performances conducted by Thomas Guggeis (2022), Markus Poschner (2023) and Alexander Soddy / Simone Young (2025). In December 2016, she sang the role of Nettie Fowler in Rodgers and Hammerstein's musical Carousel at Theater Basel in Switzerland, in a run of performances through April 2017. In September 2018, Studer sang the contralto role of Mamma Lucia in a new production of Pietro Mascagni's opera Cavalleria rusticana at Oper Graz in Austria. The performances were recorded and released by the Oehms Classics label.

In November 2021, Studer sang the role of Tertullia in a new production of Paul Dessau/Bertolt Brecht's 1951 opera Die Verurteilung des Lukullus (The Condemnation of Lucullus) at Staatsoper Stuttgart, conducted by contemporary music specialist Bernhard Kontarsky, and with tenor Gerhard Siegel in the title role.

== Masterclasses, opera workshops, adjudication ==
For eighteen years, from 2003 to 2021, Studer taught at the University of Music in Würzburg. She is also honorary professor at the Central Conservatory of Music in Beijing. Studer conducts a yearly series of master classes and opera workshops at her own North Aegean Music Festival in the island of Lesbos, Greece. She conducts Master Classes internationally (USA, Greece, South Korea, China, Spain, Italy and Germany).

== Personal life ==
Studer is married to Greek tenor Michalis Doukakis and has lived in Germany for most of her life. From previous marriages, Studer has two daughters, Elsa and Senta, named after characters from Richard Wagner operas.

== Repertoire ==
- Beethoven: Leonore in Fidelio
- Beethoven: Soprano in Missa solemnis
- Beethoven: Ah! perfido
- Bellini: Amina in La sonnambula
- Berg: Sieben frühe Lieder
- Bizet: Micaëla in Carmen
- Brahms: Soprano in Ein deutsches Requiem
- Dessau: Tertullia in Die Verurteilung des Lukullus
- Donizetti: Title role in Lucia di Lammermoor
- Egk: Die Rothaarige in Peer Gynt
- Floyd: Title role in Susannah
- Gluck: Circe in Telemaco
- Gounod: Margarethe in Faust
- Juliette in Roméo et Juliette
- Händel: Soprano II in Der Messias
- Humperdinck: Gertrtud in Hänsel und Gretel
- Janáček: Katja Kabanowa
- Lehár: Hanna Glawari in Die lustige Witwe
- Lortzing: Bertalda in Undine
- Mahler: Soprano in Symphonie Nr. 4
- Mahler: Soprano I in Symphonie Nr. 8
- Mahler: Soprano in Das Klagende Lied
- Mascagni: Mamma Lucia in Cavalleria rusticana
- Massenet: Salomé in Hérodiade
- Mozart: Konstanze in Die Entführung aus dem Serail
- Mozart: Elettra in Idomeneo
- Mozart: Countess Almaviva in Le nozze di Figaro
- Mozart: Donna Anna in Don Giovanni
- Mozart: Queen of the Night, Pamina in Die Zauberflöte
- Offenbach: Giulietta in Les contes d'Hoffmann
- Rodgers and Hammerstein: Nettie Fowler in Carousel
- Rossini: Madama Cortese in Il viaggio a Reims
- Rossini: Mathilde in Guglielmo Tell
- Rossini: Title role in Semiramide
- Schoenberg: Tove in Gurre-Lieder
- Schumann: Genoveva
- Smetana: Mařenka in Die verkaufte Braut
- Spohr: Title role in Jessonda
- Johann Strauss II: Rosalinde in Die Fledermaus
- Richard Strauss: Title role, Adelaide in Arabella
- Strauss: Title role in Ariadne auf Naxos
- Strauss: Countess in Capriccio
- Strauss: Title role in Daphne
- Strauss: Aithra in Die ägyptische Helena
- Strauss: Chrysothemis, Die Vertraute, Die Aufseherin in Elektra
- Strauss: Kaiserin, Die Stimme des Falken in Die Frau ohne Schatten
- Strauss: Marschallin in Der Rosenkavalier
- Strauss: Title role in Salome
- Strauss: Vier letzte Lieder
- Tschaikowski: Tatjana in Eugen Onegin
- Verdi: Odabella in Attila
- Verdi: Gilda in Rigoletto
- Verdi: Leonora in Il trovatore
- Verdi: Violetta in La traviata
- Verdi: Elena in I vespri siciliani
- Verdi: Title role in Aida
- Verdi: Desdemona in Otello
- Verdi: Soprano in Messa da Requiem
- Wagner: Irene in Rienzi
- Wagner: Senta in Der fliegende Holländer
- Wagner: Drolla in Die Feen
- Wagner: Elisabeth in Tannhäuser
- Wagner: Elsa in Lohengrin
- Wagner: Eva in Die Meistersinger von Nürnberg
- Wagner: Isolde in Tristan und Isolde
- Wagner: Brünnhilde, Sieglinde, Helmwige, Ortlinde in Die Walküre
- Wagner: Third Norn, Gutrune in Götterdämmerung
- Wagner: Flowermaiden in Parsifal
- Wagner: Wesendonck Lieder
- Weber: Title role in Euryanthe
- Weber: Agathe in Der Freischütz
- Wolf-Ferrari: Marina in I quatro rusteghi (Die vier Grobiane)
- Zemlinsky: Zofe in Der Zwerg

== Discography ==
=== Complete opera recordings ===
- Aida in Verdi's Aida, recorded 6/94, Royal Opera House, Covent Garden, Edward Downes, Pioneer
- Countess in Mozart's Le nozze di Figaro, recorded 5/91, Wiener Philharmoniker, Claudio Abbado, Sony
- Countess in Mozart's Le nozze di Figaro, recorded 1–2/94, Wiener Philharmoniker, Claudio Abbado, Deutsche Grammophon
- Chrysothemis in Richard Strauss' Elektra, recorded 6/89, Wiener Philharmoniker, Claudio Abbado, Pioneer
- Chrysothemis in Strauss' Elektra, recorded 1/90, Bavarian Radio Symphony Orchestra, Wolfgang Sawallisch, EMI
- Desdemona in Verdi's Otello, recorded 5/93, Opéra Bastille, Myung-whun Chung, Deutsche Grammophon
- Donna Anna in Mozart's Don Giovanni, recorded 9/90, Wiener Philharmoniker, Riccardo Muti, EMI
- Drolla in Wagner's Die Feen, recorded 7/83, Bavarian Radio Symphony Orchestra, Wolfgang Sawallisch, Orfeo
- Elena in Verdi's I Vespri Siciliani, recorded 12/89–1/90, Teatro alla Scala, Riccardo Muti, Fonit Cetra
- Elisabeth in Wagner's Tannhäuser, recorded '88, Philharmonia Orchestra, Giuseppe Sinopoli, Deutsche Grammophon
- Elisabeth in Wagner's Tannhäuser, recorded '89, Bayreuth Festival, Giuseppe Sinopoli, Philips
- Elsa in Wagner's Lohengrin, recorded 6/90, Bayreuth Festival, Peter Schneider, Philips
- Elsa in Wagner's Lohengrin, recorded '90, Wiener Philharmoniker, Claudio Abbado, Deutsche Grammophon
- Eva in Wagner's Die Meistersinger von Nürnberg, recorded 4/93, Bavarian State Opera, Wolfgang Sawallisch, EMI
- Florinda in Schubert's Fierrabras, recorded 5/88, Chamber Orchestra of Europe, Claudio Abbado, Deutsche Grammophon
- Gilda in Verdi's Rigoletto act 3, recorded 9/91, Metropolitan Opera, James Levine, Deutsche Grammophon
- Gilda in Verdi's Rigoletto, recorded 6/93, Metropolitan Opera, James Levine, Deutsche Grammophon
- Giulietta in Offenbach's Les contes d'Hoffmann, recorded 87/88/89, Sächsische Staatskapelle Dresden, Jeffrey Tate, Philips
- Gutrune in Wagner's Götterdämmerung, recorded 5/89, Metropolitan Opera, James Levine, Deutsche Grammophon
- Hanna Glawari in Lehár's Die Lustige Witwe, recorded 1/94, Wiener Philharmoniker, John Eliot Gardiner, Deutsche Grammophon
- Irene in Wagner's Rienzi, recorded 7/83, Bavarian State Opera, Wolfgang Sawallisch, Orfeo
- Jessonda in Spohr's Jessonda, recorded '84, Austrian Radio Orchestra, Gerd Albrecht, Voce
- Kaiserin (Empress) in Strauss' Die Frau ohne Schatten, recorded 2–12/87, Bavarian Radio Symphony Orchestra, Wolfgang Sawallisch, EMI
- Kaiserin (Empress) in Strauss' Die Frau ohne Schatten, recorded '92, Wiener Philharmoniker, Sir Georg Solti, Salzburg Festival, DECCA/London
- Konstanze in Mozart's Die Entführung aus dem Serail, recorded 4/91, Wiener Symphoniker, Bruno Weil, Sony
- Lucia in Donizetti's Lucia di Lammermoor, recorded 8/90, London Symphony Orchestra, Ion Marin, Deutsche Grammmophon
- Madama Cortese in Rossini's Il viaggio a Reims, recorded 10/92, Berliner Philharmoniker, Claudio Abbado, Sony
- Mamma Lucia in Mascagni's Cavalleria rusticana, recorded 2018/2019, Oper Graz/Graz Philharmonic, Oksana Lyniv, Oehms Classics
- Marguerite in Gounod's Faust, recorded 2/91, Orchestre du Capitole de Toulouse, Michel Plasson, EMI
- Matilde in Rossini's Guglielmo Tell, recorded 12/88, Teatro alla Scala, Riccardo Muti, EMI
- Odabella in Verdi's Attila, recorded 6–7/89, Teatro alla Scala, Riccardo Muti, EMI
- Odabella in Verdi's Attila, recorded 6/90, Teatro alla Scala, Riccardo Muti, Home Vision
- Ortlinde in Wagner's Die Walküre, recorded 8/81, Sächsische Staatskapelle Dresden, Marek Janowski, Eurodisc
- Queen of the Night in Mozart's Die Zauberflöte, recorded 7/89, Academy of St Martin in the Fields, Sir Neville Marriner, Philips
- Salomé in Massenet's Hérodiade, recorded 11–12/94, Orchestre du Capitole de Toulouse, Michel Plasson, EMI
- Salome in Strauss' Salome, recorded 12/90, Deutsche Oper Berlin, Giuseppe Sinopoli, Deutsche Grammophon
- Semiramide in Rossini's Semiramide, recorded 7/92, London Symphony Orchestra, Ion Marin, Deutsche Grammophon
- Senta in Wagner's Der fliegende Holländer, recorded 1/91, Deutsche Oper Berlin, Giuseppe Sinopoli, Deutsche Grammophon
- Sieglinde in Wagner's Die Walküre, recorded 2–3/88, Bavarian Radio Symphony Orchestra, Bernard Haitink, EMI
- Susannah in Carlisle Floyd's Susannah, recorded 3/94, Opéra de Lyon, Kent Nagano, Virgin
- Violetta in Verdi's La traviata, recorded 1/91, Metropolitan Opera, James Levine, Deutsche Grammophon
- Zemlinsky's Der Zwerg, recorded 1983, Berlin Radio Symphony Orchestra, Gerd Albrecht, Koch-Schwann

=== Concert recordings ===
- Samuel Barber Complete Songs, recorded 9/92, John Browning, Thomas Hampson, Emerson String Quartet, Deutsche Grammophon
- Beethoven's Missa solemnis, recorded 8/91, Wiener Philharmoniker, Salzburg Festival, James Levine, Deutsche Grammophon
- Beethoven in Berlin ("Ah! perfido"/Choral Fantasy/Egmont), recorded 12/91, Berliner Philharmoniker, Claudio Abbado, Deutsche Grammophon
- Beethoven's Symphony No. 9, recorded 4/89, Philadelphia Orchestra, Riccardo Muti, EMI
- Brahms' Ein Deutsches Requiem, recorded 10/92, Berliner Philharmoniker, Claudio Abbado, Deutsche Grammophon
- Bruckner's Mass in F minor / Mozart's Vespers, recorded 3/77, MIT Choral Society, John Oliver, private issue LP
- Donizetti's Messa da Requiem, recorded 1/84, Bamberger Symphoniker, Miguel Ángel Gómez Martínez, Orfeo
- Mahler's Das klagende Lied, recorded 11/90, Philharmonia Orchestra, Giuseppe Sinopoli, Deutsche Grammophon
- Mahler's Symphony No. 2, recorded 11/92, Wiener Philharmoniker, Claudio Abbado, Deutsche Grammophon
- Mahler's Symphony No. 8, recorded 11–12/90, Philharmonia Orchestra, Giuseppe Sinopoli, Deutsche Grammophon
- Mahler's Symphony No. 8, recorded 1/94, Berliner Philharmoniker, Claudio Abbado, Deutsche Grammophon
- Schubert Lieder, recorded 1/90, Irwin Gage, Deutsche Grammophon
- von Schweinitz's Messe, Op. 21, recorded 7/84, Berlin Radio Symphony Orchestra, Gerd Albrecht, Wergo
- Strauss Choral Works, recorded 9/84, RIAS Kammerchor, Uwe Gronostay, Marcus Creed, Deutsche Schallplatten
- Strauss' Vier Letzte Lieder/Wagner's Wesendonck Lieder and Isolde's "Liebestod", recorded 1/93, Sächsische Staatskapelle Dresden, Giuseppe Sinopoli, Deutsche Grammophon
- Verdi's Messa da Requiem, recorded 6/87, Teatro alla Scala, Riccardo Muti, EMI
- Verdi's Messa da Requiem, recorded 11/91, Wiener Philharmoniker, Claudio Abbado, Deutsche Grammophon
- Wagner, Isolde's "Liebestod", recorded 1/88, Bavarian Radio Symphony Orchestra, Jeffrey Tate, EMI
- Wagner Gala (Tannhäuser/Lohengrin/Die Meistersinger von Nürnberg/Die Walküre), recorded 12/93, Berliner Philharmoniker, Claudio Abbado, Deutsche Grammophon
- Covent Garden Gala (Otello/La traviata/Die Fledermaus), recorded 7/88, Royal Opera House, Covent Garden, John Barker, EMI
- First Europakonzert in Prague (Mozart: Non mi dir/Ch'io mi scordi di te? – Non temer, amato bene), recorded 5/91, Berliner Philharmoniker, Claudio Abbado, Sony
- The Metropolitan Opera Gala 1991, recorded 9/91, Metropolitan Opera Orchestra, James Levine, Deutsche Grammophon DVD
- Salzburg Recital (Strauss/Schubert/Debussy), recorded 8/92, Irwin Gage, Deutsche Grammophon
- Johan Botha Wiener Staatsoper Live: Beethoven | Wagner | Strauss (Atmest du nicht, from act 3 of Lohengrin), recorded 2/97, Wiener Staatsoper, Simone Young, Orfeo International

=== Solo recordings ===
- Coloratura Arias by Bellini (La sonnambula/Norma), Verdi (La traviata/Il trovatore), Donizetti (Lucia di Lammermoor/Lucrezia Borgia), Rossini (Il barbiere di Seviglia/Semiramide), recorded 4/89, Munich Radio Orchestra, Gabriele Ferro, EMI
- Sacred Works (J. S. Bach/Schubert/Mendelssohn/Handel/Mozart/Gounod/Fauré/Poulenc/Bernstein/Bruch), recorded 3/91, London Symphony Orchestra, Ion Marin, Deutsche Grammophon
- Mozart Arias (Die Entführung aus dem Serail/Die Zauberflöte/Idomeneo/Le nozze di Figaro/Don Giovanni/La clemenza di Tito/Così fan tutte), recorded 9/89, Academy of St Martin in the Fields, Sir Neville Marriner, Philips
- Schubert Lieder, recorded 6/90, Irwin Gage, piano, Deutsche Grammophon
