= Einstein (opera) =

1974 opera by Paul Dessau

Einstein is a 1974 opera by Paul Dessau to a libretto by Karl Mickel. It premiered on 16 February 1974. Einstein took longer for Dessau to compose than any of his other works, including four other operas. It began with a discussion between the composer and Bertolt Brecht shortly after the mathematician's death, but Brecht's death prevented its completion as a collaboration. It explores "the question of a scientist's responsibility to society for his inventions".

== Synopsis ==
Einstein is an adapted history. Albert Einstein, in exile from the fascism of Nazi Germany, assists the Americans in the creation of the atomic bomb. Einstein grows distrustful of American politics, and decides to burn his last twenty years of research in order to keep the knowledge safe from those that might abuse it.

Brian Foss highlighted the anti-war themes, highlighting its "boys' chorus frantically singing 'Hiroshima' and 'Nagasaki'" and Einstein's subsequent commentaries on their destruction.

== Recordings ==
- Theo Adam as Einstein, conducted by Otmar Suitner (1976)
