= Bettina (opera) =

Opera by Walter Steffens, 1966

- Chamber opera by Friedrich Schenker
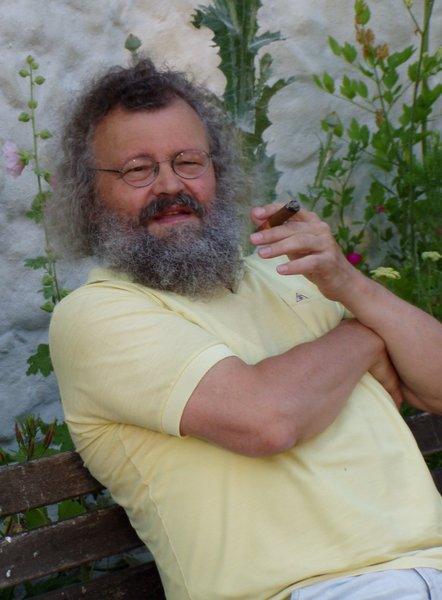
- The composer in 2005
- Librettist: Karl Mickel
- Language: German
- Based on: Goethes Briefwechsel mit einem Kinde by Bettina von Arnim
- Premiere: 2 September 1987; Theater im Palais, Berlin

Bettina is a chamber opera with music by Friedrich Schenker to a libretto by Karl Mickel. The topic is the writer Bettina von Arnim and her relationship with Karoline von Günderrode. The work is described as an "opera for one actress (mezzo-soprano), children's choir, tape and ensemble". Written in 1982, it premiered at the Theater im Palais in Berlin in 1987, and was published by Breitkopf & Härtel.

== History ==
Bettina is a chamber opera with music by Friedrich Schenker. The libretto by Karl Mickel deals with the relationship between Bettina von Arnim and Karoline von Günderrode, based on Goethe's Briefwechsel mit einem Kinde, an epistolary novel by Arnim, published in Berlin in 1835. The work is described as an "opera for one actress (mezzo-soprano), children's choir, tape, and ensemble". Written in 1982, it was premiered at the Theater im Palais in Berlin on 2 September 1987, with Annette Jahns as the singer, the choir of the Paul-Dessau-Oberschule Zeuthen and a chamber music ensemble, conducted by Gert Bahner. It was recorded with the premiere performers. The duration is about 80 minutes.

It was published by Breitkopf & Härtel.

== Plot ==
The relationship between Bettina von Arnim and Karoline von Günderrode is viewed in retrospect, after Günderrode's suicide. The only singer, a mezzo-soprano, takes both roles, in both taped and actual music. A children's choir acts as in Greek tragedy, sometimes commenting, sometimes interacting.

== Music ==
According to a reviewer, Schenker depicts the two women as developed and contradictory characters: "They are divided internally, on the path to emotional and intellectual emancipation. Strength and weakness, chaos and clarity lie harshly side by side in the music". Günderrode is represented by a waltz theme, while the music for Arnim turns to march rhythms when she decides to suppress femininity in order to survive, "Hart muss ich werden wie Stahl" (I must become hard like steel).
