= Werner Rackwitz =

German opera director and politician

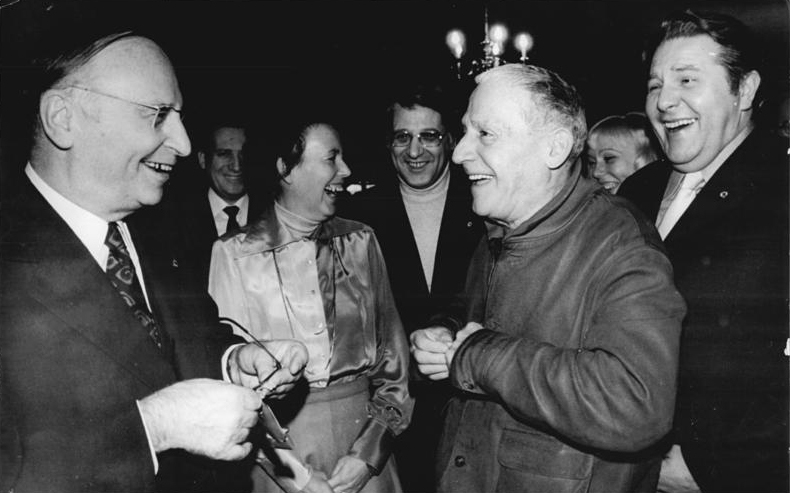
Left to right: Kurt Hager, Ruth Berghaus, Werner Rackwitz, Paul Dessau and Hans-Joachim Hoffmann in 1974

Werner Rackwitz (3 December 1929 – 14 March 2014) was a German opera director and politician. From 1963 to 1969, he was the Head of Music at the Ministry of Culture of the German Democratic Republic (East Germany) and from 1969 to 1981 he was the Deputy Minister of Culture. He was born in Breslau, Weimar Republic (now Wrocław, Poland).

Rackwitz died after a short illness on 14 March 2014 in Berlin, Germany; he was 84 years old.
