= Erhard Fischer =

German music and theater director

Martin Erhard Fischer (10 November 1922 – 20 December 1996) was a German music and theater director.

== Career ==
Born in Radeberg, Fischer studied with Heinz Arnold in Dresden. His directing debut took place in Radebeul with Mozart's Die Entführung aus dem Serail. From 1950 to 1960, Fischer worked as an assistant and director at the Dresden State Opera. From 1960 to 1965 he worked under the opera director Joachim Herz as chief conductor and artistic director of the Kleiner Haus an der Oper Leipzig; here he set up productions of Fidelio, Aida, Tannhäuser and Nabucco.

In 1965 he changed as head director, from 1969 as "chief director" to the Staatsoper Unter den Linden Berlin. Here he was also director of rarities like The Golden Cockerel, The Nose, Katerina Ismaelova (Stalinist version of the Lady Macbeth von Mzensk), The Devils of Loudun, Les vêpres siciliennes and Hans Pfitzner's Palestrina (with Peter Schreier in the title role). Among the world premieres he staged were Alan Bush's Joe Hill, Günter Kochan's Karin Lenz and Joachim Werzlau's Meister Röckle.

Fischer's appointment as chief director of the Staatsoper by its chief, the harpsichordist Hans Pischner, proved to be far-sighted, as Fischer represented a moderate opposite pole to the music theatre style of the Komische Oper Berlin, which was influenced by Walter Felsenstein, and yet, as a former comrade-in-arms of directors such as Joachim Herz, he brought both classics and world premieres to success with his skilful directing.

Fischer has also been invited as director in the Grand Theatre, Warsaw, the Bolshoi Theatre, Geneva and in various theatres in West Germany, Switzerland and Sweden.

He was also (successively) a lecturer and later head of department at the music colleges of the University of Music and Theatre Leipzig, the Hochschule für Musik Carl Maria von Weber in Dresden and the Hochschule für Musik Hanns Eisler in Berlin.

Fischer died in Berlin on 20 December 1996 aged 74.

== Theatre ==
- 1960: Bertolt Brecht/Paul Dessau: The Trial of Lucullus – Directed by Ruth Berghaus (Deutsche Staatsoper Berlin)
- 1966: Giuseppe Verdi's Rigoletto (Deutsche Staatsoper Berlin)
- 1967: Giacomo Puccini's La Bohème (Deutsche Staatsoper Berlin)
- 1968: Antonín Dvořák's Rusalka (Deutsche Staatsoper Berlin)
- 1970: Alan Bush: Joe Hill (Deutsche Staatsoper Berlin)
- 1971: Günter Kochan/Erik Neutsch: Karin Lenz (Deutsche Staatsoper Berlin)
- 1973: Dmitri Shostakovich's Katarina Ismailowa (Deutsche Staatsoper Berlin)
- 1973: Richard Strauss' Der Rosenkavalier (Deutsche Staatsoper Berlin)

== Awards ==
- Kunstpreis der DDR (1971)
- Nationalpreis der DDR (1973)
- Vaterländischer Verdienstorden in Silber (1976)

== Bibliography ==
- Dieter Kranz: Berliner Theater. 100 Aufführungen aus drei Jahrzehnten, Berlin 1990 – Gespräche mit Fischer und Wilfried Werz über Ariadne auf Naxos (p. 97–100), Die Nase (143-47), Die Teufel von Loudun (241-44), and Zimmermann's Die wundersame Schustersfrau (369-73) and a short biography (503).
