= Leonce and Lena =

1836 play by Georg Büchner

- Original title: Leonce und Lena
- Written by: Georg Büchner
- Genre: Satire

Premiere
- Date: May 31, 1895
- Place: Munich
- Directed by: Ernst von Wolzogen

Leonce and Lena (German: Leonce und Lena) is a play by German dramatist Georg Büchner (1813–1837); while considered a comedy, it is a satire veiled in humor. Written in the spring of 1836 for a competition 'for the best one- or two-act comedy in prose or verse' sponsored by Stuttgart publisher Cotta. However, Büchner missed the submission deadline and the play was returned unread. It was first performed almost 60 years later, on May 31, 1895, in an outdoor performance by the Munich Company Intimes Theater, directed by Ernst von Wolzogen and with the involvement of Max Halbe and Oskar Panizza, illustrating the fact that Büchner only gained prominence as a writer in the 20th century.

Erich Kästner considered Leonce and Lena to be one of the six most important classic comedies in German language.

== Plot summary ==
There are two imaginary countries: the Kingdom of Popo and the Kingdom of Pipi. Prince Leonce of the Kingdom of Popo and Princess Lena of the Kingdom of Pipi have had their political marriage arranged. (Popo and Pipi are children's language – Popo means "buttocks" and Pipi means "urine".)

=== Act one ===
Scene 1 – A garden in the Kingdom Popo

Prince Leonce is in the garden, complaining about his own life as a "prince of Kingdom Popo". He meets Valerio who is a lot different to him and will be his companion later.

Scene 2 – A room in the Kingdom Popo

King Peter of the Kingdom Popo is being dressed up by valets. He concerns more with his duties as a King than with his people.

Scene 3 – Leonce's room in the Kingdom Popo

Leonce's girlfriend Rosetta is in his room and dances for him but he confesses he does not love her anymore, and so she goes out. The president of the council comes in his room and reminds him of the wedding ceremony with Lena on the day after. Leonce decides to flee the Kingdom to avoid the wedding.

Scene 4 – A garden in Kingdom Pipi

Lena is in the garden with her governess. She tells the governess that she does not want to get married with a man whom she does not know and love. She decides to run away with the governess's help to escape her arranged marriage.

=== Act two ===
Scene 1 – Open country

Leonce and Valerio are on their way to Italy, and also Lena and governess are on their way to Italy.

Scene 2 – A garden of the inn

Leonce and Valerio arrive at an inn. A bit later, Lena and the governess arrive at the same inn. Leonce hears Lena's voice and falls in love with her.

Scene 3 – A room in the inn

Lena and the governess are in a room, but Lena goes out to go to the garden.

Scene 4 – The garden in the inn (night and moonshine)

Leonce and Lena meet in the garden. Leonce confesses to Lena he fell in love with her and kisses her but she runs away. That makes Leonce want to commit suicide by jumping into the river but Valerio stops him.

=== Act Three ===
Scene 1 – The garden in the inn

Leonce decides to marry Lena and tells Valerio about it.

Scene 2 – open area in front of the king Peter's palace

Many people are in front of the palace to celebrate Leonce and Lena's wedding. This event is arranged and controlled by the schoolmaster.

Scene 3 – Grand stateroom

King Peter and his followers try to figure out how to solve the problem that Prince Leonce and Princess Lena are not there in their wedding day. Finally, Leonce, Lena, Valerio and the governess arrive with masks on their faces. Valerio takes off the masks and presents the two world famous automatons. King Peter decides to make those two robots get married instead of Prince Leonce and Princess Lena. Therefore, the two robots get married and then take off their masks. They realize each other's real identities.

== Play analysis ==
Leonce and Lena both decide to escape their duties as a prince and princess, and avoid their arranged marriage. However, they meet each other in Italy during their escape, fall in love, and get married. Then the question arises, has fate determined the final event or did the two coincidentally meet? Leonce and Lena are controlled by fate even though they try to escape from it. For example, in Act I, Leonce meets Valerio, who enjoys his life. Their initial meeting might be the sign of Leonce's escaping. At the same time in the Kingdom of Pipi, Lena is with her governess in the garden lamenting because she has to be married with the prince of the kingdom of Popo, a man whom she had never met. The governess' role is very similar to Valerio's in this play. Lena does not know who Leonce is and does not feel she could love him. She wants to fall in love with someone but is not given a choice. She is similar to Leonce. The governess feels pity for Lena and takes her out of the kingdom to escape the marriage.

Leonce and Lena both are heading to Italy. On their way they meet coincidentally or as a sign of fate. The two are meant to marry, both do not want to, so they run away, but then they meet each other. It is a very predictable love story. Leonce falls in love with Lena as soon as he sees her and he confesses his love to her. Usually, we say in this situation, "I found my fate". They ran away from their fate and faced another fate, but ironically the fates are exactly the same thing. When Leonce expresses his love to Lena, she does not respond. There is not much about their love story in this play and they decide to be married rapidly. Probably Büchner skipped the love story because he is writing about fate. If they believe it was fate that they have met each other, then they would be together.

In act 3, Leonce and Lena return to the Kingdom of Popo with Valerio and the governess to be married. They disguise themselves as robots and Valerio introduces them to the kingdom to stage a wedding. In the kingdom, everything is ready for a wedding but the prince and princess. Therefore, King Peter settles to make the two robots represent the prince and princess and have them married instead of the real prince and princess. When they remove their disguise it becomes known to everyone that they are the true prince and princess and their love was true.

Does fate come to us, if fate exists? It may be presumed that Leonce and Lena represent the symbol of the rebellion against their parents but regardless they have done what their parents wanted. If Leonce and Lena did not run away from their fate, they would get married, but they may not be happy with each other. Let us say fate exists, but it is not one door. Maybe the door is huge, so there are so many ways to be reached or it is behind of a lot of different doors so that we need to choose and experiment. Büchner shows us the example of dealing with fate in this play. Meeting with Valerio, escaping the kingdom, going to Italy and so on, all these tasks are the pathway to the door of fate.

== Characters ==
- King Peter: Ruler of the Kingdom of Popo, Peter is a small-minded bureaucrat who frequently becomes tangled in his own muddled philosophy and who must tie a knot in his handkerchief to remind him to spare a thought for his people.
- Prince Leonce: Crown Prince of Popo, Leonce can be seen as an amalgamation of characterisations from plays by different authors. Like Fantasio, hero of the eponymous French play by Alfred de Musset, Leonce is much older than his years and jaded by melancholy; he cannot abide the insincerity and shallowness of courtly life and political responsibilities. He is averse to the idea of an arranged marriage, and though aware of his duty to his father wishes, flees the realm. There are also a number of strong links between the character of Leonce and, for example, Valeria, in Brentano's Ponce de Leon, and Shakespeare's Prince Hamlet.
- Princess Lena: Crown Princess of the Kingdom of Pipi, she is similarly fearful of the idea of an arranged marriage and is unable to grasp why the state must "drive a nail through two hands which never sought each other out". She, too, flees with her governess to avoid the threat of an imposed fate.
- Valerio: Leonce's companion; he may be described as hedonistic in his preoccupation with food, drink and a comfortable living, and this coarsely materialistic aspect of his character is in stark contrast with the dreamy, contemplative melancholy of Leonce.
- The Governess: Lena's governess and companion. She takes pity on the mournful Lena in Act I and facilitates her fleeing the realm.
- Rosetta: Leonce's concubine; she loves Leonce but is treated cruelly in return. In Leonce's own words, he is "bored with loving her", and makes every effort throughout their encounter in the first act to stifle any remaining reciprocating sentiment.
- Schoolmaster: Seen in Act III, directing the masses of downtrodden peasants as to how they should behave as they line the streets, hoping to catch a glimpse of the royal wedding procession. He reminds the peasants of their good fortune in having their betters allow them to smell the meals that they themselves cannot afford to eat.
- Court Chaplain, Court Tutor, Court Master of Ceremonies, President of the Privy Council, District Administrator: A series of faceless, toadying officials of the Court of Popo who bow instantly to the word of the King.

== Adaptations ==
Operatic adaptations of the play exist by Eric Zeisl (1937, premiered 1952) and Paul Dessau (1979). A ballet based on the play, choreographed by Christian Spuck, premiered in Stuttgart in 2008.
