= Theo Adam =

German opera singer (1926–2019)

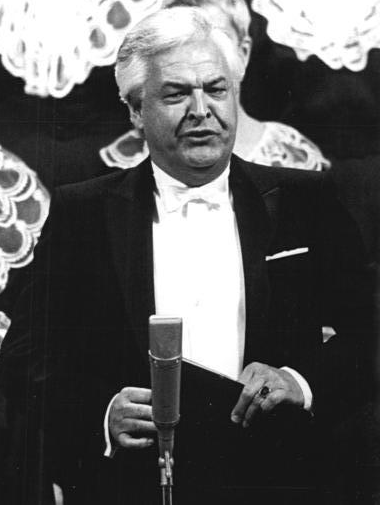
- Adam in 1987
- Born: 1 August 1926; Dresden, Germany
- Died: 10 January 2019 (aged 92); Dresden, Germany
- Occupation: Opera singer (bass)

Theo Adam (1 August 1926 – 10 January 2019) was a German operatic bass-baritone and bass singer who had an international career in opera, concert and recital from 1949. He was a member of the Staatsoper Dresden for his entire career, and sang at the Bayreuth Festival from 1952 to 1980. He particularly excelled in portraying roles by Richard Wagner, especially Wotan in Der Ring des Nibelungen, which he also performed at the Metropolitan Opera, among others. In concert, he was a much admired Bach singer and also drew acclaim for his interpretation of the title character of Mendelssohn's Elijah. He was a voice teacher at the Musikhochschule Dresden.

== Career ==
Born in Dresden, Adam sang with the Dresdner Kreuzchor as a boy from 1936 to 1942. He served in the German Army in World War II. He studied singing privately with Rudolf Dietrich between 1946 and 1949. He made his professional debut at the Staatsoper Dresden as Czernikowski in Mussorgsky's Boris Godunov in 1949, followed by the Hermit in Weber's Der Freischütz. In 1952, he joined the roster of singers at the Berlin State Opera. He remained a member of the house throughout his career.

He appeared at the Bayreuth Festival first in 1952, as Ortel in Wagner's Die Meistersinger von Nürnberg. He returned annually to Bayreuth for many years, taking on the role of Heinrich der Vogler in Lohengrin in 1954, Titurel (and one of the Gralsritter) in Parsifal the same year, Fasolt in Das Rheingold in 1958, and Wotan in Der Ring des Nibelungen in 1963. He eventually added Amfortas in Parsifal, Hans Sachs and Veit Pogner in Die Meistersinger von Nürnberg, and the title role in Der fliegende Holländer to his Bayreuth performance credits.

Adam made his début at the Royal Opera House in London as Wotan in 1967. He made his first appearance at the Salzburg Festival as Ochs in Der Rosenkavalier by Richard Strauss in 1969, returning there three years later in the title role of Alban Berg's Wozzeck. At the Theater an der Wien, he appeared as Pizarro in Beethoven's Fidelio in a 1970 production celebrating the composer's bicentenary of birth. He appeared as Mozart's Don Giovanni at the Vienna State Opera in a new 1972 production.

At the Metropolitan Opera, he appeared first as Sachs in Die Meistersinger on 7 February 1969, alongside Pilar Lorengar as Eva, John Alexander as Stolzing, conducted by Joseph Rosenstock. That same year he was Wotan in Das Rheingold and Die Walküre, alongside Birgit Nilsson, Régine Crespin, Lili Chookasian, and Jon Vickers, conducted and directed by Herbert von Karajan. He returned to the Metropolitan Opera in 1972 for Sachs and Wotan with a similar cast that now also included Gwyneth Jones. After a sixteen-year absence, Adam returned for the last time in March 1988 as Wotan in Die Walküre with Peter Hofmann as Siegmund, Sabine Hass as Sieglinde, conducted by James Levine.

Adam appeared in a number of world premieres, especially three operas written for him: the title roles in Paul Dessau's Einstein (1974, Berlin) and Friedrich Cerha's Baal, an adaption of Bertolt Brecht's play Baal, (1981, Salzburg), and the role of Prospero in Berio's Un re in ascolto (1984, Salzburg). A reviewer wrote about Baal: "Adam had to reinvent himself. He usually looks noble in whatever part he sings, perhaps appearing so naturally, whereas here he had to act the dissolute anarchist." In 1979, Adam was named a Kammersänger of the Vienna State Opera.

Adam recorded several complete operas, including Mozart's Così fan tutte (1969), Fidelio (1969 and 1979), Der fliegende Holländer (with Anja Silja, conducted by Otto Klemperer, 1968), Der Freischütz (1973 and 1985), Hänsel und Gretel (1970), Beethoven's Leonore (with Edda Moser and Richard Cassilly, 1976), Die Meistersinger (conducted by Karajan 1970), Parsifal (as Amfortas, with René Kollo in the title role, 1975), Der Ring des Nibelungen (conducted by Karl Böhm, 1966–67; and by Marek Janowski, 1980–1983), Tannhäuser (1968–69), Wozzeck (1970 and 1973), and Mozart's Die Zauberflöte (as Sarastro, 1968; elsewhere as the Sprecher). He participated in the first recording of the Berio's Un re in ascolto (with Karan Armstrong, conducted by Lorin Maazel, 1984). His non-operatic recordings include the Raphael in Haydn's Die Schöpfung, Bach's Christmas Oratorio, and the Mozart Requiem. He was a regular soloist with the Münchener Bach-Chor conducted by Karl Richter, performing and recording Bach's cantatas and Passions.

Adam was praised for his robust voice, intelligent interpretation and stage presence, and sometimes criticized for abrasive tone quality, unsteadiness, and wobble.

Adam taught voice as honorary professor at the Musikhochschule Dresden from 1979.

Adam died on 10 January 2019 in Dresden.

== Publications ==
Adam wrote books about his life, career, and perspective on opera:

- Seht, hier ist Tinte, Feder, Papier. Aus der Werkstatt eines Sängers. Henschelverlag, Berlin 1980.
- Die hundertste Rolle oder: Ich mache einen neuen Adam. Henschelverlag, Berlin 1986, ISBN 3-362-00009-6.
- Ein Sängerleben in Begegnungen und Verwandlungen. Henschelverlag, Berlin 1996, ISBN 3-89487-250-0.
- "Sprüche in der Oper". Erlebt und gesammelt während 50 Sängerjahren in aller Welt. Parthas Verlag, Berlin 1999, ISBN 3-932529-66-9.
- Vom Sachs zum Ochs. Meine Festspieljahre. Parthas Verlag, Berlin 2001, ISBN 3-932529-34-0.

== Literature ==
- Hamilton, David. (1987). The Metropolitan Opera Encyclopedia: A Comprehensive Guide to the World of Opera. New York, London, Toronto, Sydney, Tokyo: Simon and Schuster. p. 12. ISBN 0-671-61732-X.
- Rosenthal, Harold and John Warrack. (1979, 2nd ed.). The Concise Oxford Dictionary of Opera. London, New York and Melbourne: Oxford University Press. p. 2. ISBN 0-19-311318-X.
- Sadie, Stanley and Christina Bashford. (1992). The New Grove Dictionary of Opera. London: Macmillan Publishers Ltd. Vol. 1, p. 16. ISBN 0-935859-92-6.
- Sadie, Stanley and John Tyrrell. (2001). The New Grove Dictionary of Music and Musicians. London: Macmillan Publishers Ltd. Vol. 1, p. 134. ISBN 0-333-60800-3.
- Warrack, John and Ewan West. (1996 3rd ed.). The Concise Oxford Dictionary of Opera. New York: Oxford University Press. p. 2. ISBN 0-19-280028-0.
