= Barrie Stavis =

American dramatist (1906–2007)

- Born: June 16, 1906
- Died: February 2, 2007 (aged 100)
- Education: Columbia University
- Occupation: Playwright
- Spouses: Leona Heyert (m. 1925; div. 1939); Bernice Coe (m. 1950; died 2001)
- Writing career
- Notable works: Lamp At Midnight (1947), The Man Who Never Died (1958)
- Military career
- Allegiance: United States
- Branch: United States Army
- Service years: 1942-1945
- Rank: Sergeant
- Unit: US Army Signal Corps

Barrie Stavis (June 16, 1906 – February 2, 2007) was an American playwright.

Stavis was educated at New Utrecht High School in Brooklyn, and later Columbia University. Afterwards, he covered the Spanish Civil War from 1937 to 1939 as a foreign correspondent and served in the US Army Signal Corps from 1942-1945 as a Technical-Sergeant.

== Career ==
Stavis wrote several plays about men struggling in the vortex of history. His subjects include scientist Galileo, abolitionist John Brown, and labor leader Joe Hill. His play, Lamp at Midnight, about Galileo's struggle with the Catholic Church to get his ideas accepted, was performed and televised on the Hallmark Hall of Fame in 1966. Melvyn Douglas starred as Galileo.

Stavis's plays can be done on a clean, simple stage. They have been translated into 28 languages and have been produced in dozens of major theaters around the world and in numerous college theaters.

Stavis was actively working until his death on February 2, 2007, at the age of 100.

=== Major plays ===
- Harpers Ferry (New York: A.S. Barnes, 1960, 67). First new play in a classical repertory produced by the Guthrie Theater, Minneapolis, 1967: John Brown adopts guerrilla warfare to overthrow slavery. The raid on Harpers Ferry fails and he is executed, but slavery is eventually abolished.
- Lamp At Midnight (New York: A.S. Barnes, 1966). First produced at New Stages, New York, 1947. Television adaptation Hallmark Hall of Fame, 1966: Galileo challenges religious dogma with science and finds enormous resistance to the truth.
- The Man Who Never Died (New York: A.S. Barnes, 1972). Joe Hill confronts power by organizing a trade union and pays with his life. First produced at the Jan Hus Theater, New York, 1958.
- The Raw Edge of Victory in Dramatics (Vol. 57, No. 8 and 9; April and May 1986): George Washington leads a revolution to establish national independence.

== Personal life ==
Stavis's marriage to Leona Heyert in 1925 ended in divorce in 1939. His second marriage to Bernice Coe in 1950 lasted for more than fifty years, until her death in 2001.

The National Theatre Conference names its prize for emerging playwrights the Barrie and Bernice Stavis Playwriting Award in Stavis and his wife's honors.
