= Die Verurteilung des Lukullus =

Die Verurteilung des Lukullus (The Condemnation of Lucullus) is an opera by Paul Dessau to a libretto by the German dramatist Bertolt Brecht.

Brecht's dramatic text for the opera is more or less identical to that of the radio-play The Trial of Lucullus, which was written in 1938–9.

== Performance history ==
The opera was first performed under the latter's title at the Berlin Staatsoper on 17 March 1951, conducted by Hermann Scherchen, with stage design by Caspar Neher. It was withdrawn, revised, and reinstated with its present title on 12 October 1951.

The opera was broadcast on the radio in an English-language translation by the BBC's Third Programme on 20 March 1953.

In November 2021, the Staatsoper Stuttgart mounted a new production of the opera, directed by Franziska Kronfoth and Julia Lwowski and staged by the musical-theater-collective Hauen und Stechen. The performances were conducted by contemporary music specialist Bernhard Kontarsky and featured tenor Gerhard Siegel as Lukullus and soprano/mezzo-soprano Cheryl Studer as Tertullia.

== Roles ==
- The fishwife (contralto)
- The farmer (bass)
- The baker (tenor)
- The cherrytree bearer (baritone)
- The king (bass)
- The teacher (tenor)
- The dead judge (bass)
- The courtesan (mezzo-soprano)
- The queen (soprano)
- Lasus (tenor)
- Lukullus (tenor)
- Tertullia (mezzo-soprano)

== Recording ==
recorded 1964, Leipzig, Herbert Kegel
