= Walter Schulz (cellist) =

German cellist (1893–1968)

Walter August Wilhelm Schulz (27 September 1893 – 21 January 1968) was a German cellist, viol player and college teacher. From 1945 to 1948 he was director of the Hochschule für Musik Franz Liszt, Weimar.

== Life ==
Schulz was born in Frankfurt (Oder). After attending a secondary school in Berlin, he studied cello privately with Hugo Dechert in Berlin from 1912 to 1916. From 1916 to 1918 he was a member of the Blüthner Orchestra. In 1918 he became a cellist with the Berlin Philharmonic. In 1920 he received a position as 2nd soloist cellist of the Berlin Philharmonic Orchestra.

In 1926 he became concertmaster and 1st solo cellist as successor of Eduard Rosé at the Staatskapelle Weimar, where he was active until 1936. From 1933 he was a teacher for cello and chamber music at the state music school. In 1934 he received an extraordinary and in 1947 a full professorship at the State Academy of Music Weimar. From July 1945 to March 1948 he was acting director and first post-war director of the institution. During his term of office, 2-year plans were in force which were to commit the college of music to Marxism-Leninism.

In 1951 he became a professor at the University of Music and Theatre Leipzig.

From 1926 Schulz performed as a soloist and chamber musician. As such, he played in the Reitz-(Jürgen Stegmüller: Das Streichquartett. Eine internationale Dokumentation zur Geschichte der Streichquartett-Ensembles und Streichquartett-Kompositionen von den Anfängen bis zur Gegenwart. (Quellenkataloge zur Musikgeschichte. Vol. 40). Noetzel, Wilhelmshaven 2007, ISBN 978-3-7959-0780-8, p. 202 and Bosse Quartets as well as in the Dahlke and Weimarer Trios. He also appeared as a gambist. In 1941, he published Grifftechnische Studien für fortgeschrittene Cellisten.

From 1928 to 1933 he was a lodge member in Jena. During the period of National Socialism, he lived in seclusion. Although he was considered politically German-national, he stayed away from the NSDAP. After the Second World War he became a member of the KPD.

Schulz was married. His son was the opera singer Hanns-Herbert Schulz (1927–2006), who also performed under the pseudonym Hanns Petersen. Schulz died in Berlin at the age of 74.

== Writings ==
- Violoncell-Schule (Hofmeister-Schulen. Nr. 41). Hofmeister, Leipzig 1951 (reimpression 1954 and 1960).

== Literature ==
- Gerassimos Avgerinos: Künstler-Biographien: die Mitglieder im Berliner Philharmonischen Orchester von 1882–1972. Self edited, Berlin 1972, p. 148.
- Margot Backhaus: Schulz, Walter. In Gabriele Baumgartner, Dieter Hebig (ed.): Biographisches Handbuch der SBZ, DDR. Vol. 2: Maassen – Zylla. Saur, Munich 1997, ISBN 3-598-11177-0, p. 826.
- Wolfram Huschke: Zukunft Musik: Eine Geschichte der Hochschule für Musik Franz Liszt Weimar. Böhlau, Cologne among others. 2006, ISBN 3-412-30905-2, p. 311.
- Erich H. Müller (ed.): Deutsches Musiker-Lexikon. W. Limpert-Verlag, Dresden 1929.
- Fred K. Prieberg: Handbuch Deutsche Musiker 1933–1945. 2. Ed., Kopf, Kiel 2009, ISBN 978-3-00-037705-1, p. 6833.
- Rudolf Vierhaus (ed.): Deutsche Biographische Enzyklopädie (DBE). Vol. 9: Schlumberger – Thiersch. 2nd revised and extended edition, K. G. Saur, Munich 2008, ISBN 978-3-598-25039-2, p. 285.
