= Christian-Wagner-Preis =

German literary award

Christian-Wagner-Preis is a literary prize of Germany. Since 1992, the Christian Wagner Society has been awarding the Christian Wagner Prize to a contemporary poet every two years "in memory of the poet and his program of protecting all living things as much as possible". According to the statutes, the jury consists of five personalities from literary life. The jury decides on the winner in a closed session. The prize money is €10,000.

== Recipients ==
- 1992: Richard Leising, Berlin
- 1994: Tuvia Rübner, Israel
- 1996: Johannes Kühn, Hasborn/Tholey
- 1998: Karl Mickel, Berlin
- 2000: Friederike Mayröcker, Vienna
- 2002: Michael Donhauser, Vienna
- 2004: Dorothea Grünzweig, Finland.
- 2006: Oswald Egger, Hombroich/Vienna
- 2008: Wulf Kirsten, Weimar
- 2010: Helga M. Novak, Berlin
- 2012: Lutz Seiler, Wilhelmshorst
- 2014: Nico Bleutge, Berlin
- 2016: Kito Lorenc, Hochkirch/Wuischke
- 2018: Jürgen Nendza, Aachen
- 2020: Esther Kinsky, Vienna
