= Annette Jahns =

German contralto (1958–2020)

- Born: 24 June 1958; Dresden, East Germany
- Died: 11 September 2020 (aged 62); Dresden, Germany
- Occupations: Operatic mezzo-soprano; Operatic contralto; Opera director; Academic teacher
- Organizations: Semperoper; Hochschule für Musik Carl Maria von Weber

Annette Jahns (24 June 1958 – 11 September 2020) was a German operatic mezzo-soprano and contralto, and opera director, based at the Semperoper in Dresden. She appeared at international opera houses and festivals, with a focus on contemporary music including world premieres. She taught at the Hochschule für Musik Carl Maria von Weber, Dresden.

== Life ==
Born in Dresden in 1958 to a family of opera singers, Jahns began her vocal studies in 1975 at the Hochschule für Musik Carl Maria von Weber, Dresden; she attended master classes with Judith Beckmann, Ute Niss and Theo Adam. In 1982, she was accepted into the opera studio of the Semperoper, and from 1986, she was a member of the ensemble of the Semperoper. She appeared there, in addition to classical contralto and mezzo-soprano roles, in world premieres, such as Sarah Chatterton in Thomas Chatterton by Matthias Pintscher on 25 May 1998, repeated at the Volksoper in Vienna. She performed in the world premiere of Peter Ruzicka's Celan on 25 March 2001.

She portrayed the title role in Bettina by Friedrich Schenker to a libretto by Karl Mickel, premiered at the Theater im Palast in Berlin on 2 September 1987, and recorded. The opera's only singing role portrays Bettina von Arnim, who expresses herself through speaking, singing, whispering, and screaming. Since 1999, Jahns worked as a freelance singer and director. In 2000 and 2001, she appeared at the Bayreuth Festival as Grimgerde in Die Walküre. She directed Puccini's Madama Butterfly in Dresden in 2003.

Jahns taught at the Hochschule für Musik Carl Maria von Weber from 1995. She collaborated with Pina Bausch from 1996. In 2000, she recorded a CD of songs by Johannes Brahms with the pianist Damian Zydek. She worked as secretary of the performing arts and film class at the Sächsische Akademie der Künste from 2005 to 2008.

Jahns died from a long illness in Dresden on 11 September 2020 at age 62.

== Staged productions ==
Jahns's stage productions included:

- Johann Gottlieb Naumann: Medea. Stadttheater Meißen. Premiere: 1999. Conductor: Franns Wilfried Promnitz von Promnitzau; set: Arne Walter; costumes: Marina Zydek
- Puccini: Madama Butterfly. Semperoper 19 July 2003. Conductor: Anthony Bramall; set: Hartmut Schörghofer; costumes: Frauke Schernau
- Rossini: La Cenerentola. Bayerische Theaterakademie August Everding. 27 May 2005 Stadttheater Ingolstadt, 17 June 2005 Prinzregententheater Munich. Conductor: Bruno Weil; set: Hannes Neumaier; costumes: Marina Zydek
- Orff: Carmina Burana. Mittelsächsisches Theater. 16 June 2006 Nikolaikirche Freiberg. Conductor: Jan Michael Horstmann; set and costumes: Marina Zydek; choreography: Erwin Hesse
- Gluck: Orfeo ed Euridice. 17 November 2007 Stadttheater Freiberg. Conductor: Jan Michael Horstmann; set and costumes: Marina Zydek; choreography: Erwin Hesse

== Awards ==
- 1987 Kritikerpreis for the Berlin premiere of Bettina
- 1995 Förderpreis der Landeshauptstadt Dresden
