= Lamp At Midnight =

Lamp At Midnight is a play that was written by Barrie Stavis, and first produced in 1947 at New Stages, New York. The play treats the 17th-century Galileo affair, which was a profound conflict between the Roman Catholic Church and Galileo Galilei over the interpretation of his astronomical observations using the newly invented telescope. By coincidence, Bertolt Brecht's play on the same theme, Life of Galileo, opened in New York just a few weeks before Lamp at Midnight. Some critics now consider Galileo to be a masterpiece, but in 1947 the New York Times reviewer, Brooks Atkinson, preferred Lamp at Midnight.

== Revival ==
A revival of Lamp at Midnight directed by Sir Tyrone Guthrie and starring Morris Carnovsky toured the United States in 1969.

== Adaptation for television ==
Lamp at Midnight
- Directed by: George Schaefer
- Screenplay by: Robert Hartung
- Based on: Lamp at Midnight by Barrie Stavis
- Starring: Melvyn Douglas; Kim Hunter; Hurd Hatfield; William Kerwin
- Music by: Bernard Green
- Release date: 1966
- Running time: 76 minutes
- Country: United States
- Language: English

A television adaptation, directed by George Schaefer and starring Melvyn Douglas as Galileo, appeared in the Hallmark Hall of Fame series in 1966. A recording of the television performance was released to video in 1983.
