= Irma Baltuttis =

German singer and entertainer

- Born: Elsbeth Johanna Irma Baltuttis; September 28, 1920; Leipzig, Germany
- Died: May 20, 1958 (aged 37); Leipzig, Germany
- Occupation: Singer
- Years active: 1947 – 1958

Elsbeth Johanna Irma Baltuttis (Lithuanian: Baltutis; 28 September 1920 — 20 May 1958) was a German singer and entertainer based in Leipzig, Germany.

== Biography ==
Baltuttis was born in the Leutzsch district of Leipzig, to Ernst Baltuttis and Elsa Hamann. Her parents recognized her talent and encouraged training for music early on.

After training in music during the Third Reich, her singing career took place within the German Democratic Republic after the Soviet occupation of Eastern Germany. Some of her music is featured on Spotify.

== Personal life ==
In the early 1950s, she married a doctor named Max Herricht, an important member of the Socialist Unity Party of Germany.

== Death ==
Baltuttis died on May 20, 1958, after falling out of her apartment window in Leipzig. Although her death was officially classified as suicide, some speculated that her husband had pushed her out of the window. This speculation was fueled by the post-mortem circumstances: no autopsy was performed, nor was a coroner's inquest held.

== Selected discography ==
- Ich Hab' Mich so an Dich Gewoehnt (I've become so accustomed to you)
  — her first hit, recorded in 1947 in Leipzig
- Leg´ deine Hand in meine Hand (with Hanns Petersen) - recorded in 1953 (Burger, S. Schmidt)
- Spatz und Spätzin (with Hanns Petersen) - recorded in 1953 (Helmut Nier)
- Wenn du wüsstest, ach, wie ich dich liebe (with Hanns Petersen) - recorded in 1951 (Rolf Zimmermann, Günter Klein)
- Wir sind füreinander bestimmt (with Hanns Petersen) - recorded in 1951 (Gerhard Winkler, Hase)
- Die Sonne Geht Schlafen (The Sun is Going Asleep)
  — written by Gerhard Froboess & Leo Breiten; recorded in July 1948 in Berlin
- Komm Mit Nach Saratow (Come With Me to Saratov)
  — written by Fradkin (trans. from the Russian by Helmut Kießling); recorded in August/September 1951 in Berlin
- Ganz Paris Träumt von der Liebe (All Paris Dreams of Love — original English title: I Love Paris)
  — written by Cole Porter (German lyrics by Kurt Feltz); recorded on March 28, 1955, in Leipzig.
- Die kleine Fischerhütte in Lugano (The Little Fishing Hut in Logano)
  written by Brandner & Breé; duet with Peter Cornehlsen; appears as track 10 in volume 1 of the collection Kurt Henkels und sein Orchester, in the series Die Grossen Deutschen Tanzorchester (The Great German Dance Orchestras)
