= Report from Herrnburg =

Report from Herrnburg is a production performed by a youth chorus that consisted of ten songs, each with a brief introductory commentary, written by the German dramatist Bertolt Brecht, and two fragments of film, given on a concert platform in the form of a report. The music for the production was composed by Paul Dessau. It was directed by Egon Monk at the Deutsches Theater in Berlin in August 1951. The Free German Youth chorus performed the piece as part of the World Festival of Democratic Youth; the production was awarded the National Prize, First Class.

== Works cited ==
- Willett, John. 1959. The Theatre of Bertolt Brecht: A Study from Eight Aspects. London: Methuen. ISBN 0-413-34360-X.
