= Leonce und Lena (opera) =

1979 opera by Paul Dessau

Leonce und Lena is a 1979 opera by Paul Dessau after the play Leonce und Lena by Georg Büchner.

== Recording ==
König Peter: Reiner Süß, Leonce: Eberhard Büchner, Lena: Carola Nossek, Valerio: Peter Menzel, Gouvernante: Edda Schaller, Otmar Suitner
