= Karl Mickel =

German writer (1935–2000)

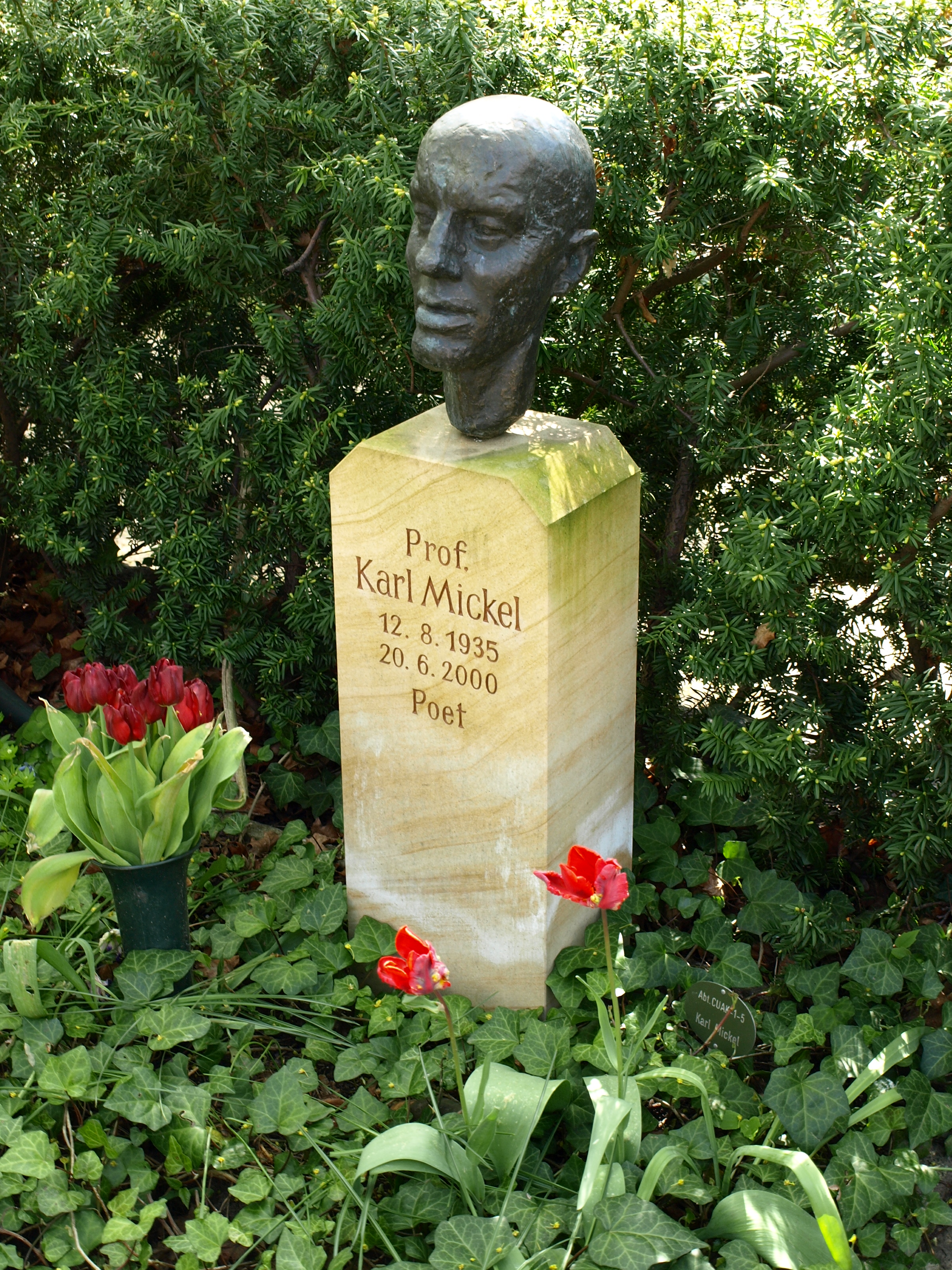
Grave of Karl Mickel at the Dorotheenstadt Cemetery in Berlin.

Karl Mickel (12 August 1935 – 20 June 2000) was a German writer.

== Life ==
Mickel was born in Dresden into a working-class family. There, he attended primary school from 1941 to 1949 and experienced together with his mother the bombing of Dresden in February 1945. The pictures of the following days never left him. From 1949 to 1953, he also attended secondary school in Dresden. He finished with the Abitur and was admitted to study in Berlin.

From 1953 to 1958, Mickel studied economic planning and economic history with Hans Mottek and Jürgen Kuczynski at the Hochschule für Ökonomie Berlin. In 1958, he was an employee of the magazine Die Wirtschaft, and from 1959 to 1963 editor of the magazine Junge Kunst. Afterwards, he was a scientific assistant at the Hochschule für Ökonomie in Berlin and a member of the management of the Berliner Ensemble, where he worked together with Ruth Berghaus, lastly professor at the Ernst Busch Academy of Dramatic Arts in Berlin. Mickel was assigned to the Sächsische Dichterschule. Mickel had two children with his wife, furthermore, his relationship with the poet Sarah Kirsch gave a son.

Mickel worked from 1959 to 1964 as IM "Michael" and from 1987 to 1989 as IMS "Bert" for the East German Stasi.

Mickel died in Berlin at the age of 64.

== Work ==
Poetry and prose

- Lobverse und Beschimpfungen. Poetry. Mitteldeutscher Verlag 1963
- Vita nova mea. Rotbuch Verlag 1966
- Eisenzeit. Poetry. Mitteldeutscher Verlag, 1975
- Eisenzeit. Poetry. 1981. ISBN 3-880221-56-1
- Odysseus in Ithaka. Poetry
- Palimpsest. Gedichte und Kommentare 1975–1989. Mitteldeutscher Verlag 1990. ISBN 3-354005-96-3
- Lachmunds Freunde. Novel
  - Erstes Buch. Mitteldeutscher Verlag 1991. ISBN 3-354006-00-5
  - Erstes (vom Autor revidierte Fassung) und Zweites Buch (unvollendet). Wallstein 2006
- Die Jahre.
- Aus der Anderwelt. Erzählungen. Verlag Ulrich Keicher, 1998. ISBN 3-932843-06-1
- Gelehrtenrepublik. Aufsätze und Studien von Klopstock bis Papenfuß. Mitteldeutscher Verlag 2000. ISBN 3-932776-92-5
- Der Besuch. Lyrik und Texte aus dem Nachlaß. Verlag UN ART IG 2003. ISBN 3-9807613-9-8
- Geisterstunde. poetry, private impression, 1999. New edition: Wallstein Verlag, 2004. ISBN 3-892447-41-1

Plays and libretti

- Die Einverstandenen. Revue. Music Günter Kochan. UA 1958
- Requiem für Patrice Lumumba. Cantata. Music: Paul Dessau. UA 1964
- Nausikaa. Drama. Premiere 1968
- Einstein. Opera, music Paul Dessau. Premiere 1974
- Celestina. Tragicomedy after Fernando de Rojas. Premiere 1975 Berliner Ensemble
- Bettina. Opera, Music (1982): Friedrich Schenker. Premiere 1987 Berlin (with Annette Jahns)
- Gefährliche Liebschaften oder Der kalte Krieg. Opera seria. Musik (1993): Friedrich Schenker. Premiere 1997 Ulm
- Volks Entscheid. Pieces. 1987
- Halsgericht. Comedy after Apuleius). Mitteldeutscher Verlag 1994. ISBN 3-354005-97-1
- Kants Affe. Ein Todtengespräch – Immanuel Kant / de Sade. Mit Grafiken von Nuria Quevedo. Edition Balance, 1994
- Goldberg-Passion. Music (1998/99): Friedrich Schenker. Premiere 9 November 1999 in Leipzig

Editor

- In diesem besseren Land (with Adolf Endler). Halle 1966
- Jahrbuch der Lyrik (with Christoph Buchwald). Darmstadt 1990

Audiobook

- in Dichtung des 20. Jahrhunderts: Meine 24 sächsischen Dichter, edited by Gerhard Pötzsch, 2 CDs, Militzke Verlag Leipzig 2009, ISBN 9783861899358

== Honours ==
- 1978: Heinrich-Mann-Preis
- 1997: Wilhelm-Müller-Preis des Landes Sachsen-Anhalt
- 1998: Christian-Wagner-Preis
