= Philipp Kraus =

German operatic baritone

Philipp Kraus (18 May 1879 – October 1964) was a German operatic baritone and singing teacher.

== Life ==
Born in Frankenthal, Kraus was the son of a box manufacturer who later lived in Memel. His singing talent became apparent early on and so, instead of an apprenticeship in a hotel, he trained as a baritone singer from 1904. He completed his training in Frankfurt and received his first engagement in Colmar in 1906. He then moved to Erfurt and later to Basel. He served as a soldier in World War I and was severely wounded by a bullet to the head in 1915. From 1916, he then had stage appearances again in Berlin, Hamburg and Bremen.

In Bremen, he performed first as a lyric baritone and later as a character baritone. In 1919, he married the singer and singing teacher Grete Fritzsche, the daughter of a Berlin bandmaster. In 1925, he sang at the Bayreuth Festival and had as partners, among others, Enrico Caruso and Leo Slezak. Until 1936, he sang many German operas among others in Berlin. At the same time, he and his wife organised well-attended concerts. He became an honorary member of the Theater Bremen and was also active there as an opera director and head stage manager. From 1942 to 1944, he performed as a operetta buffo at the Theatre of West Pomerania in Greifswald.

After World War II, Kraus was licensed by the US military government to operate the Theater Bremen as director. The music theatre ensemble gave performances with well-known opera excerpts in town houses, cinemas and the Kunsthalle from 1945 onwards. In 1946, his directorship had already ended.

Kraus worked at his wife's singing school in Bremen until 1962. In 1963, they both moved to Söcking on Lake Starnberg. After his death, his widow moved back to Bremen and his urn was also buried in Bremen. Their son Fritz Kraus (born 1920) also received vocal training and worked as a singer, actor and stage manager at the Theater Bremen.

Kraus died in Söcking (Starnberg) at the age of 85.
