= Coriolanus (Brecht) =

Mid-20th-century play by Bertolt Brecht

Coriolanus is an unfinished German adaptation by the modernist playwright Bertolt Brecht of the English 17th-century tragedy of the same name by William Shakespeare. Brecht wrote it sometime between 1951 and 1953. This adaptation reveals the influence of Mao Zedong on Brecht's social thought especially the idea of primary and secondary contradictions which Mao discussed in his treatise On Contradiction. Brecht alluded to this text and discusses his development on the original and his ideas for its staging in an essay entitled "Study of the First Scene of Shakespeare's Coriolanus", which is written in the form of a dialogue with his collaborators at the Berliner Ensemble theatre company. The play was first staged by Heinrich Koch at the Frankfurt Schauspielhaus theatre, where it opened on 22 September 1962. It was later staged by the Berliner Ensemble in September 1964. Ruth Berghaus became famous for her staging of the battle scenes in this production. The play was published in an English translation by Ralph Manheim in volume nine of Brecht's Collected Plays.

== Works cited ==
- Brecht, Bertolt. 1964. Brecht on Theatre: The Development of an Aesthetic. Ed. and trans. John Willett. British edition. London: Methuen. ISBN 0-413-38800-X. USA edition. New York: Hill and Wang. ISBN 0-8090-3100-0.
- Manheim, Ralph and John Willett, eds. 1972. Collected Plays: Nine. By Bertolt Brecht. Bertolt Brecht: Plays, Poetry, Prose Ser. New York: Vintage. ISBN 0-394-71819-4.
- Willett, John. 1959. The Theatre of Bertolt Brecht: A Study from Eight Aspects. London: Methuen. ISBN 0-413-34360-X.
