= Kurt Henkels =

German bandleader

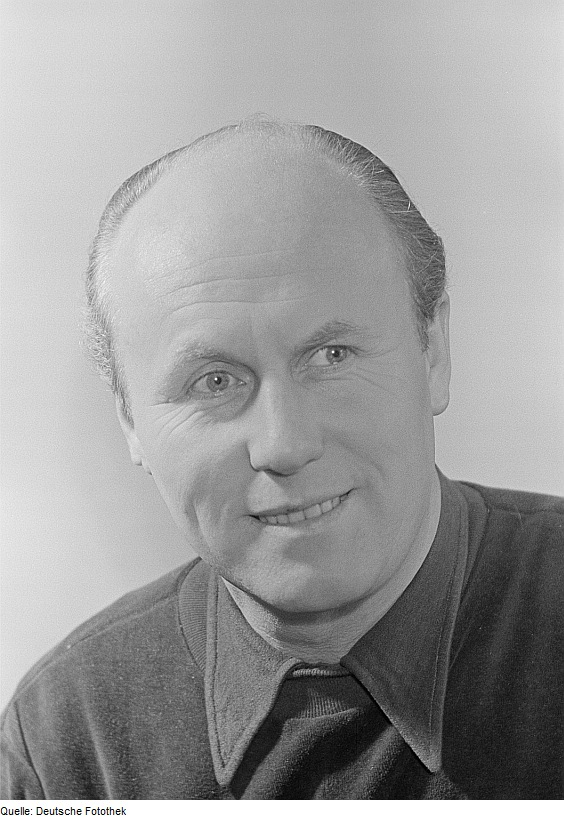
Kurt Henkels, 1952

Kurt Henkels (December 17, 1910, Solingen - July 12, 1986, Hamburg) was a German bandleader who led jazz and light music ensembles. He led radio and television dance bands from the 1930s into the 1970s and made over 250 recordings.
