= The Trial of Lucullus =

The Trial of Lucullus is a short didactic radio play by the German dramatist Bertolt Brecht written in verse. It was completed in 1940. In it, the great Roman general Lucullus appears after death before a judge and jury of the underworld, who are to decide whether he should be condemned to Hades or admitted to the Elysian fields. The jury, representing the lower classes, allows Lucullus to call as witnesses portrayed on a triumphal frieze. All the evidence is against Lucullus, except for the fact that he introduced the cherry tree to Europe, grieved over the destruction of books, and was possessed of a fine culinary experience.

Though first conceived as an opera, the text was set to music by Paul Dessau. Communist authorities banned it, causing Brecht to revise scenes and changing the title to The Condemnation of Lucullus. The revised version of The Condemnation of Lucullus premiered in 1951.

== Bibliography ==
- Calabro, Tony, Bertolt Brecht's Art of Dissemblance, Longwood Academic, 1990.
