= Joe Hill (opera) =

Opera by Alan Bush

Joe Hill the Man Who Never Died
- Opera by Alan Bush
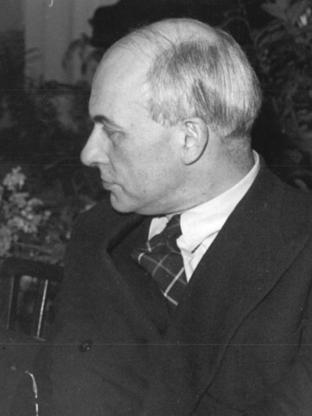
- Alan Bush in 1952
- Librettist: Barrie Stavis
- Language: English
- Based on: Life of Joe Hill
- Premiere: 29 September 1970; Berlin State Opera

Joe Hill: the Man Who Never Died is an opera with music by British composer Alan Bush based on a 1958 play by Barrie Stavis, The Man Who Never Died. It is based on the life and death of Joe Hill, a trade union activist and songwriter. Composed in 1965–1967, it was first performed at the Berlin State Opera in East Berlin on 29 September 1970. It was introduced to the UK by a broadcast of the BBC in 1979.

== History ==
Alan Bush composed his fifth and final opera in 1965–1967 on a commission from the Berlin State Opera in East Berlin, where other works by the composer had been performed. Bush's compositions were better received in East Germany than in the West. The opera's libretto is based on a play by the American Barrie Stavis, The Man Who Never Died, which was first performed at the Jan Hus Theater in New York City in 1958. Stavis arranged the libretto himself, after Nancy Bush, Alan's wife and principal librettist, who first worked on a libretto, failed to retain the short scenes of the play. It is based on the life of Joe Hill, an immigrant to the U.S. from Sweden, who became a union activist and songwriter. He was controversially convicted of murder and executed in 1915. Four songs by Joe Hill, written as encouragement of industrial workers, became musical material for the composition.

The opera was premiered at the Berlin State Opera in East Berlin on 29 September 1970, conducted by Heinz Fricke, directed by Erhard Fischer, in a stage design by Wilfried Werz. Erich Siebenschuh appeared in the title role. Reviewer James Helme Sutcliffe of The New York Times noted that the performance was "visually exciting despite the economy of the approach". Both authors attended the opening night.

The opera was broadcast on BBC Radio 3 in 1979, and repeated twice, once in 1985. The performance was conducted by James Judd, with the BBC Singers (chorus-master: Simon Joly) and the BBC Concert Orchestra.
