= Gerhard Siegel =

German operatic tenor (born 1963)

Gerhard Siegel (born in 1963) is a German operatic tenor.

== Life and career ==
Born in Trostberg, Siegel studied at the Leopold Mozart Centre in Augsburg with Kammersänger Liselotte Becker-Egner. After engagements at the Theater Trier from 1993, the Anhalt Theatre from 1995 and the Staatstheater Nürnberg from 1998 to 2006, the singer worked freelance.

Siegel gave guest performances at opera houses including Komische Oper Berlin, Deutsche Oper Berlin, Staatsoper Berlin, Staatsoper Wien, Theater an der Wien, Nationaltheater München, Metropolitan Opera in New York, New National Theatre Tokyo, Teatro Real in Madrid, Korea National Opera in Seoul, and Gran Teatre del Liceu in Barcelona.

He made his debut at the Royal Opera House in 2004 as Mime in Wagner's Der Ring des Nibelungen. The role became his signature role which he also performed at the Bayreuth Festival from 2006 to 2008. His roles also include Florestan in Beethoven' Fidelio, the title role in Wagner's Parsifal, Bacchus in Ariadne auf Naxos by Richards Strauss, Herod in his Salome, Tristan in Tristan und Isolde, and the Captain in Alban Berg's Wozzeck. He has worked with conductors such as Antonio Pappano, Jeffrey Tate, James Levine, Ivor Bolton, Zubin Mehta, Jesús López Cobos, Sylvain Cambreling and Christian Thielemann.

In the 2014/15 season, Siegel appeared in the title role of Wagner's Lohengrin for the first time, at the Theater Augsburg. A reviewer noted his stage presence, exceptional diction and the brilliance of his high register. In 2016, Siegel was Midas in Die Liebe der Danae by Richard Strauss at the Salzburg Festival, staged by Alvis Hermanis and conducted by Franz Welser-Möst.
