= Lanzelot =

Lanzelot is a 1969 opera by Paul Dessau to a libretto by Heiner Müller and Ginka Tsholakova, based on Evgeny Schwartz's 1944 play Der Drache (The Dragon). It premiered on 19 December 1969 at the Berlin State Opera. It was revived in 2019 at the Weimar Opera.
