= Ruth Berghaus =

German stage director

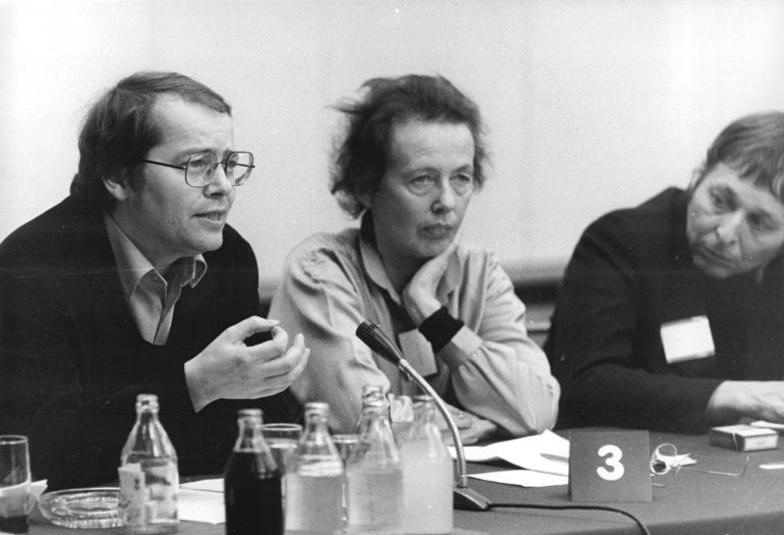
- Director Ruth Berghaus (center), author Volker Braun (left) and sculptor Wieland Förster in Berlin 1981.
- Born: 2 July 1927; Dresden, Germany
- Died: 25 January 1996 (aged 68); Zeuthen, Germany
- Resting place: Dorotheenstadt Cemetery, Berlin-Mitte
- Occupation: Opera director
- Spouse: Paul Dessau (m. 1954–1979)

Ruth Berghaus (2 July 1927 – 25 January 1996) was a German choreographer, director of opera and drama, and artistic director.

== Life and career ==
Berghaus was born in Dresden and studied Expressionist dance and Dance direction with Gret Palucca there and was an advanced student at the German Academy of Arts in Berlin, at least part of the time under Walter Felsenstein – associated with the Komische Oper East Berlin he founded – along with his two other first leading protégés, Götz Friedrich and Joachim Herz (1924–2010). All three would mark a departure from Felsenstein's insistence on textual accuracy in favor of Brechtian interpretation but were in part inspired by also his insistence on maintaining an even balance between the musical and dramatic aspects of an opera being staged. From 1951 to 1964, Berghaus worked as choreographer on many stages, including the Deutsches Theater Berlin, the Staatsoper Berlin and the Berliner Ensemble. Her work as a director began with the Die Verurteilung des Lukullus of Paul Dessau and Bertolt Brecht, at the Staatsoper, in 1960. Brecht's work would represent a major part of Berghaus's career. She became well known for her choreography of the slaughter scenes in Brecht's adaptation of Shakespeare's Coriolanus at the Berliner Ensemble in 1964.

In 1954, Berghaus married the composer Paul Dessau, whose works for the theater she directed. Her association with the Berliner Ensemble culminated with her directorship of that theater, starting in 1971. After two decades of an aesthetic and intellectual standstill—driven by the strict regiment of the Brecht heirs—Ruth Berghaus’ direction brought an audacious and innovative approach to the Berliner Ensemble. She supported nonconformist authors and directors, such as Einar Schleef and Heiner Müller. One of her greatest achievements in that period was her own experimental staging of Brecht's first version of The Mother in 1974, based on Gorky. Objected by the Brecht heirs, Berghaus’ theatrical approach was generally questioned from that moment on. With the support of the Brecht heirs and the Central Committee of the SED, Manfred Wekwerth—who later was recognized as an “informal collaborator” of the Stasi—succeeded in disempowering Ruth Berghaus and installing himself as director in 1977.

From 1980 to 1987, Berghaus worked at the Oper Frankfurt. Her notable productions there included Mozart's Die Zauberflöte in 1981, Die Entführung aus dem Serail in 1981, Les Troyens by Berlioz in 1982 (designs by Hans-Dieter Schaal), Janáček's Věc Makropulos, and Wagner's Parsifal and in 1985 Der Ring des Nibelungen. In 1992, she returned to Frankfurt to direct Der Rosenkavalier by R. Strauss. Her work at the Oper Frankfurt also marked an important collaboration there with Michael Gielen as music director. The indirect influence of Berghaus's unique intellectual grasp of choreography in her staging of opera can (perhaps) be also felt in productions by Harry Kupfer, including of his Ring cycle at Bayreuth and at Staatsoper Berlin and also of Jurgen Flimm – worthy of note his production of Otello at Staatsoper Berlin – also conducted by Daniel Barenboim. Her most notable protégés are today reckoned to be Konwitschny and the American producer David Alden.

In 1985, in Prague, she directed Alban Berg's Wozzeck and, in Dresden, Die Weise von Liebe und Tod des Cornets Christoph Rilke by Siegfried Matthus. In 1986, she first worked at the Vienna State Opera with the choreography of Hans Werner Henze's Orpheus. In 1988 she staged Schoenberg's Moses und Aaron at the Staatsoper Berlin, conducted by Friedrich Goldmann. With a key modernist opera by an Austrian-American composer, staged in East Germany's leading opera house, the event has been considered a major breakthrough in overcoming the state dogma of socialist realism. In Brussels, Berghaus directed Berg's Lulu in 1988, and in that same year, Schubert's Fierrabras. In Zürich, her productions included Webers's Der Freischütz and Wagner's Der fliegende Holländer. Her final operatic production was Die Fledermaus by J. Strauss, produced in Leipzig in 1995. Performed and published posthumously, the only representation of Ruth Berghaus on film is Weber's Der Freischütz, a Zurich revival of 1999, conducted by Nikolaus Harnoncourt.

In 1989, she began a theatrical series of what she called 'related texts', with a production of Büchner's Danton's Death and in 1991 a production of Brecht's In the Jungle at the Thalia Theater in Hamburg.

Berghaus died in 1996, in Zeuthen near Berlin due to complications from cancer. She was buried at the Dorotheenstadt Cemetery in Berlin-Mitte.

== Works cited ==
- Meech, Tony. 1994. "Brecht's Early Plays." In Thomson and Sacks (1994, 43–55).
- Thomson, Peter and Glendyr Sacks, eds. 1994. The Cambridge Companion to Brecht. Cambridge Companions to Literature Ser. Cambridge: Cambridge University Press. ISBN 0-521-41446-6.

== See also ==
Alexander Berghaus is a nephew of Ruth Berghaus.
