= Paul Dessau =

German composer (1894–1979)

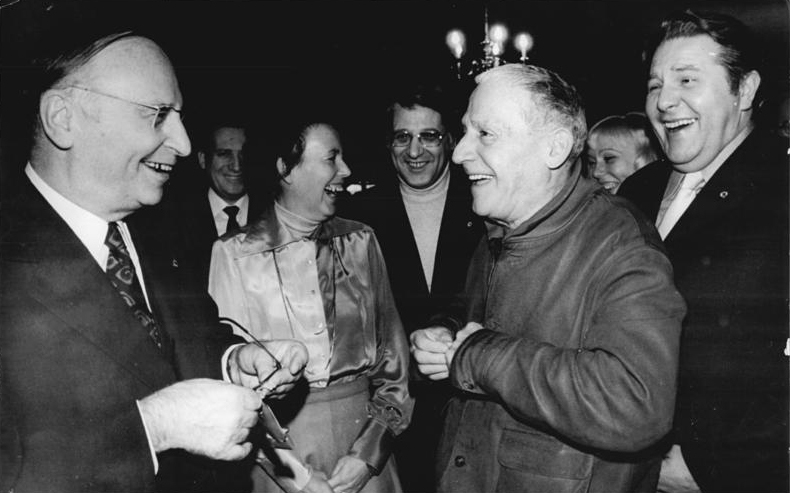
- Kurt Hager, Ruth Berghaus, Werner Rackwitz, Paul Dessau and Hans-Joachim Hoffmann in 1974
- Born: 19 December 1894; Hamburg, German Empire
- Died: 28 June 1979 (aged 84); Königs Wusterhausen, GDR
- Education: Klindworth-Scharwenka Conservatory
- Occupations: Composer; Conductor
- Spouse: Ruth Berghaus
- Children: Maxim Dessau

Paul Dessau (19 December 1894 – 28 June 1979) was a German composer and conductor. He collaborated with Bertolt Brecht and composed incidental music for his plays, and several operas based on them.

== Biography ==
Dessau was born in Hamburg into a musical family. His grandfather, Moses Berend Dessau (1821–1881), was a cantor in the Hamburg synagogue. His uncle, Bernhard Dessau, was Konzertmeister at the Staatskapelle Berlin; his cousin, Max Winterfeld, became known under the name Jean Gilbert as a composer of operettas; and his second cousin, Robert Gerson Müller-Hartmann, was a composer and collaborator with Ralph Vaughan Williams.

From 1909, Dessau studied with Florian Zajic at the Klindworth-Scharwenka Conservatory in Berlin, majoring in violin. In 1912 he became répétiteur at the Stadttheater Hamburg, the municipal theatre. He studied the work of the conductors Felix Weingartner and Arthur Nikisch and took classes in composition from Max Julius Loewengard. He was second Kapellmeister at the Tivoli Theatre in Bremen in 1914 before being drafted for military service in 1915.

After World War I he became conductor at the Kammerspiele Hamburg and was répétiteur and later Kapellmeister at the Cologne Opera under Otto Klemperer between 1919 and 1923. In 1923 he became Kapellmeister at the Staatstheater Mainz and from 1925 Principal Kapellmeister at the Städtische Oper Berlin under Bruno Walter.

In 1933 Dessau emigrated to France, and in 1939, he moved further to the United States, where initially he lived in New York City before moving to Hollywood in 1943. Dessau returned to Germany with his second wife, the writer Elisabeth Hauptmann, and settled in East Berlin in 1948.

Starting in 1952, he taught at the Staatliche Schauspielschule (State drama school) in Berlin-Oberschöneweide where he was appointed professor in 1959. He became a member of the GDR Akademie der Künste in 1952 and was vice-president of this institution between 1957 and 1962. He taught many master classes, his students including Friedrich Goldmann, Reiner Bredemeyer, Jörg Herchet, Hans-Karsten Raecke, Friedrich Schenker, Luca Lombardi and Karl Ottomar Treibmann.

Dessau was married four times: Gudrun Kabisch (1924), with whom he had two children, Elisabeth Hauptmann (1943), Antje Ruge (1952), and choreographer and director Ruth Berghaus (1954), with whom he had a son, Maxim Dessau (born 1954) who became a film director.

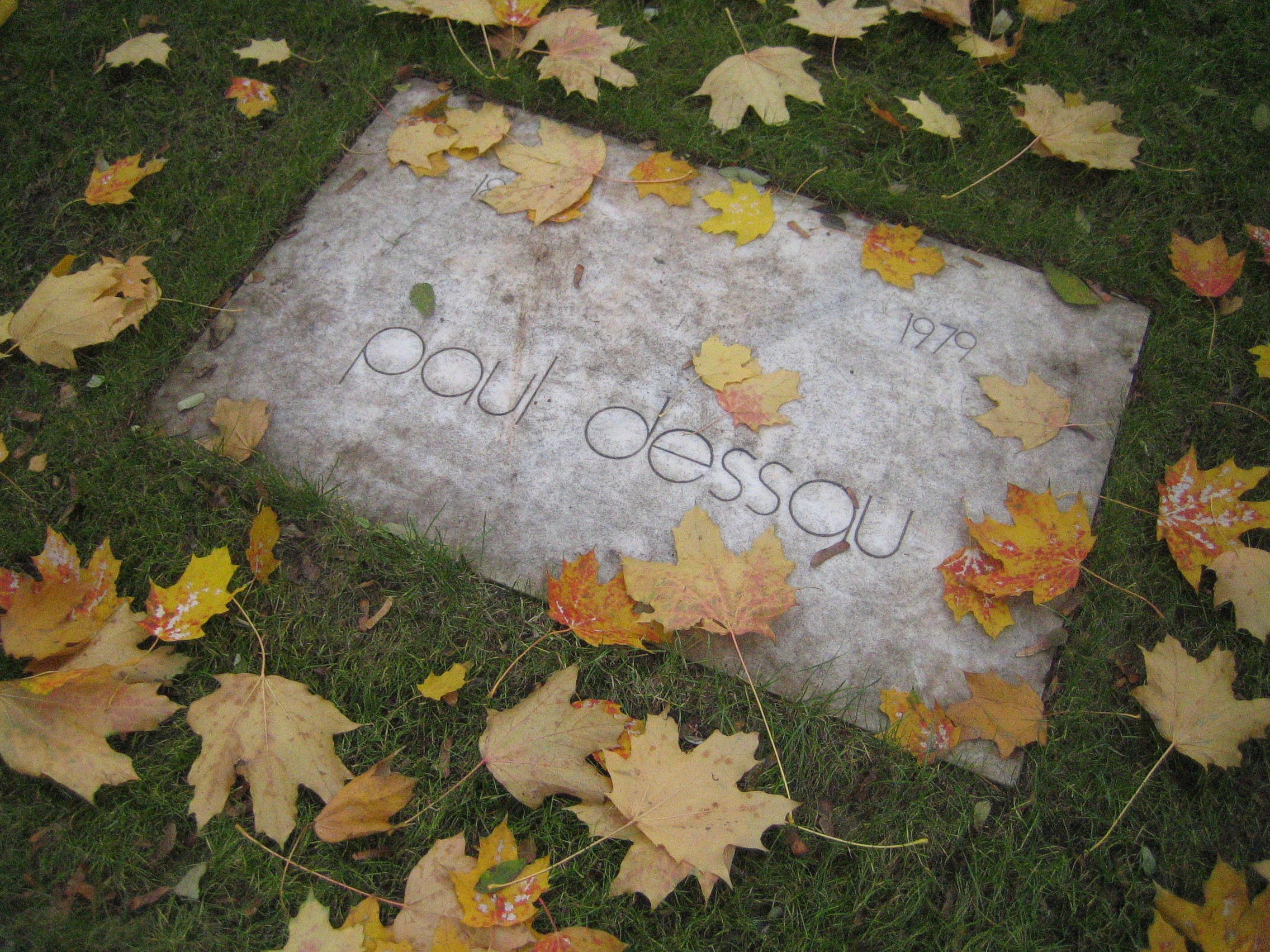
Dessau's grave in Berlin

Dessau died on 28 June 1979 at the age of 84, in Königs Wusterhausen, on the outskirts of Berlin.

== Works ==
Dessau composed operas, scenic plays, incidental music, ballets, symphonies and other works for orchestra, and pieces for solo instruments as well as vocal music. From the 1920s on, he was fascinated by film music. He composed music for early movies of Walt Disney, as well as background music for silent pictures and early German films. In exile in Paris he wrote the oratorio Haggadah shel Pessach after a libretto by Max Brod based on the Haggadah. In the 1950s in collaboration with Bertolt Brecht he focused on the musical theatre. During that time several of his operas were produced. He also wrote Gebrauchsmusik (utility music) for the propaganda of the German Democratic Republic. At the same time he lobbied for the avant-garde music (e.g. Witold Lutosławski, Alfred Schnittke, Boris Blacher, Hans Werner Henze and Luigi Nono). His compositions were published by Schott Music. The Akademie holds many of his works in its archives.

=== Operas ===
All operas by Dessau were premiered at the Staatsoper Berlin.

- Die Reisen des Glücksgotts (fragment), 1945 (after Bertolt Brecht)
- Die Verurteilung des Lukullus, after Brecht's Das Verhör des Lukullus, 1949–1951, world premiere on 17 March 1951
- Puntila, 1956–1959, libretto by Peter Palitzsch and Manfred Wekwerth after Brecht's play, 15 November 1966
- Die heilige Johanna der Schlachthöfe [fragment], 1961, after Brecht's play
- Lanzelot, 1967–69, libretto by Heiner Müller and Ginka Tsholakova, 19 December 1969
- Einstein, 1969–1973, libretto by Karl Mickel, 16 February 1974
- Leonce und Lena, 1976–1979, libretto by Thomas Körner after Georg Büchner's play, 24 November 1979

=== Incidental music ===
- 99% – eine deutsche Heerschau (1938, which became Furcht und Elend des Dritten Reiches) 1938
- Guernica 1938
- Mutter Courage und ihre Kinder 1946–1949
- Der gute Mensch von Sezuan 1947–1948
- Die Ausnahme und die Regel 1948
- Herr Puntila und sein Knecht Matti, folk play, 1949
- Wie dem deutschen Michel geholfen wird. Clownspiel (clown play) 1949
- Der Hofmeister 1950
- Herrnburger Bericht for youth choir, soloists and orchestra 1951
- Mann ist Mann 1951–1956
- Urfaust 1952–1953
- Don Juan 1953
- Der kaukasische Kreidekreis 1953–1954
- Coriolan 1964

=== Film music ===
- Alice the Fire Fighter (Alice und ihre Feuerwehr) (21.8.1928), Alice's Monkey Business (Alice und die Flöhe) (25.9.1928), Alice in the Wooly West (Alice und die Wildwest-Banditen) (18.10.1928) and Alice Helps the Romance (Alice und der Selbstmörder) (31.1.1929) by Walt Disney
- L'Horloge Magique. 2. La Forêt enchanté (Der verzauberte Wald) (7 September 1928) and L'Horloge Magique. 1. L'Horloge Magique (Die Wunderuhr) (12 November 1928) by Ladislas Starevich
- Doktor Doolittle und seine Tiere (15 December 1928) by Lotte Reiniger with arrangements of music by Kurt Weill, Paul Hindemith and a private composition
- Musical director in musical and operetta films together with Richard Tauber (among others The Land of Smiles, Melody of Love). with melodies by Franz Lehár and Bronisław Kaper
- 400 cm^3 documentary
- Stürme über dem Mont Blanc (1930), The White Ecstasy (1931) and S.O.S. Eisberg (1933), all directed by Arnold Fanck
- Adventures in the Engadin (1932)
- White Cargo (by Robert Siodmak), Yoshiwara (by Max Ophüls), The Novel of Werther (by Ophüls)
- Crossroads (1938)
- Gibraltar (1938)
- Final Accord (1938)
- The White Slave (1939)

=== Works for choir ===
- Deutsches Miserere for mixed choir, children's choir, soprano, alto, tenor and bass soloists, large orchestra, organ and trautonium 1943–1944
- Internationale Kriegsfibel for soloists, mixed choir, and instruments 1944–45
- Die Erziehung der Hirse, a musical epic for one narrator, one solo voice, a mixed choir, a youth choir, and a large orchestra 1952–1954
- Vier Grabschriften.
  - Grabschrift für Gorki for one or several male voices and brass (1947)
  - Grabschrift für Rosa Luxemburg for mixed choir and orchestra
  - Grabschrift für Liebknecht
  - Grabschrift für Lenin
- 5 Songs for three female voices a cappella:
  - "Die Thälmannkolonne"
  - "Mein Bruder war ein Flieger"
  - "Vom Kind, das sich nicht waschen wollte"
  - "Sieben Rosen hat der Strauch"
  - "Lied von der Bleibe"
- " Appell der Arbeiterklasse" for alto and tenor solo, narrator, children's and mixed choir and large orchestra, 1960–1961

=== Songs ===
- "Kampflied der schwarzen Strohhüte" 1936
- "Freiheit" (also known as "Thälmann-Kolonne") 1936
- "Lied einer deutschen Mutter" 1943
- "Das deutsche Miserere" 1943
- "Horst-Dussel-Lied" 1943
- "Wiegenlied für Gesang und Gitarre" 1947
- "Aufbaulied der FDJ" 1948
- "Zukunftslied" 1949
- "Friedenslied" for one solo voice with one accompanying voice (text: Bertolt Brecht after Pablo Neruda) 1951
- "Der Augsburger Kreidekreis" A dramatic ballad for music 1952
- "Jakobs Söhne ziehen aus, im Ägyptenland Lebensmittel zu holen" for children's choir, soloists and instruments 1953
- "Der anachronistische Zug" ballad for song, piano and percussion 1956
- "Kleines Lied" for song and piano 1965
- "Historie vom verliebten Schwein Malchus" for solo voice 1973
- "Spruch für Gesang und Klavier" 1973
- "Bei den Hochgestellten" 1975

=== Other compositions ===
- In memoriam Bertolt Brecht for large orchestra 1956–1957
- Bach-Variationen for large orchestra 1963
- Symphonic Mozart-Adaptation (after the Quintet, K.614) 1965
- Lenin, music for orchestra no. 3 with concluding chorus "Grabschrift für Lenin" 1969
- Für Helli, small piece for piano 1971
- Bagatelles for viola and piano (1975)
- Sonatine for viola and piano (1929)
- 2 symphonies
- 7 string quartets and others

== Awards ==
- Award of the music publisher Schott 1924
- National Prize III. Category 1953
- National Prize II. Category 1956
- National Prize I. Category 1965
- Vaterländischer Verdienstorden (Decoration of Honour for Services to the GDR) in Gold 1965
- Karl-Marx-Orden (Karl-Marx–Decoration) 1969
- National Prize I. Category 1974

== Further reading and documentary ==
- Dessau, Paul. Notizen zu Noten, ed. Fritz Henneberg (Reclam, Leipzig 1974).
- Dessau, Paul. Aus Gesprächen (VEB Deutscher Verlag für Musik, Leipzig 1974).
- Henneberg, Fritz. Dessau – Brecht. Musikalische Arbeiten. (Henschel, Berlin 1963).
- Hennenberg, Fritz. Paul Dessau. Eine Biographie. (VEB Deutscher Verlag für Musik, Leipzig 1965).
- Lucchesi, Joachim (ed.). Das Verhör in der Oper: Die Debatte um die Aufführung "Das Verhör des Lukullus" von Bertolt Brecht und Paul Dessau (BasisDruck, Berlin 1993).
- Paul Dessau - Let´s Hope For The Best - film documentary (Yellow Table Media/NDR/ARTE, Leipzig 2023)
