= Isoldé Elchlepp =

German opera singer (born 1942)

- Born: Waltraud Isolde Elchlepp; 20 May 1942 (age 84); Strasbourg
- Other name: Dominique
- Occupations: Protest song singer; Operatic mezzo-soprano
- Organizations: Theater Bremen; Hessisches Staatstheater Wiesbaden; Staatsoper Hannover

Waltraud Isoldé Elchlepp (born 20 May 1942) is a German singer who began as a protest song singer under the pseudonym Dominique, and became an operatic mezzo-soprano and soprano. She has appeared at major German opera houses and festivals including the Bayreuth Festival. She took part in world premieres such as Reimann's Das Schloß and Bernarda Albas Haus at the Bavarian State Opera. Besides the standard repertoire, she appeared in roles such as Othmar Schoeck's Penthesilea at the Staatsoper Hannover.

== Life and career ==
Elchlepp was born in Strasbourg (France, at the time annexed by Nazi Germany), grew up in Karlsruhe and went to college in Brighton, England. Her father died during the Second World War, and her mother moved to Munich with her and her older sister. At the request of her mother, Elchlepp first studied fashion graphic design in Munich, and simultaneously undertook voice training. An Austrian producer became aware of her, and thus Elchlepp, who called herself Dominique as a protest singer, signed her first record contract in 1965. She began with hits and scored her first success with the protest song "Der ewige Soldat", based on "The Universal Soldier" by Buffy Sainte-Marie/Donovan, with German lyrics by Max Colpet. Further singles followed and also appeared on her LP Krieg im Frieden. She recorded several songs by Bob Dylan, Werner Scharfenberger, Udo Westgard, and Pete Seeger.

She trained at the opera studio of the Bavarian State Opera in Munich, now under the name Isoldé Elchlepp. She appeared in small roles at the Bavarian State Opera, such as Kate Pinkerton in Puccini's Madama Butterfly in 1973 and in Der Rosenkavalier by Richard Strauss in 1975. From 1975 to 1982, she was a member of the Theater Bremen, then from 1982 to 1988 at the Hessisches Staatstheater Wiesbaden, moving to the Staatsoper Hannover. Her roles included Venus in Wagner's Tannhäuser, Brünnhilde in Der Ring des Nibelungen, Kundry in Parsifal, Azucena in Verdi's Il trovatore, Santuzza in Mascagni's Cavalleria Rusticana, Marie in Alban Berg's Wozzeck and Hekabe in Aribert Reimann's Troades, also works by Haydn, Mozart and Orff.

She performed at the Bayreuth Festival, in 1985 and 1986 as Rossweiße in Die Walküre, and in 1993 as Ortrud in Lohengrin. In 1992, she performed the role of the landlady at the world premiere of Reimann's Das Schloß, and in 2000, she appeared as La Poncia in the premiere of the composer's Bernarda Albas Haus, both at the Bavarian State Opera. In 1999 she appeared in the title role of Othmar Schoeck's Penthesilea at the Staatsoper Hannover, conducted by Andreas Delfs; a reviewer noted her stage presence, and how she sang the difficult part without showing how difficult it is. In 2001 she portrayed the title role of Elektra by R. Strauss at the Komische Oper Berlin, directed by Harry Kupfer. A reviewer noted that she utilised "the entire expressive spectrum of the female voice, from tender cantilenas to snarling chants."

Elchlepp also performed in concert, for example in the performance of Schönberg' Gurre-Lieder for the opening of the new Konzerthaus Freiburg in Freiburg on 28 June 1996. Johannes Fritzsch conducted soloists, the Freiburger Bachchor and the Philharmonisches Orchester Freiburg, with Werner Hollweg as the narrator in a performance that was recorded.

== Discography ==
As Isoldé Elchlepp

- Richard Strauss: Der Rosenkavalier. Gesamtaufnahme. Bayerisches Staatsorchester, Carlos Kleiber (conductor). Orfeo D'Or C581083D, 2008 (1973 recording)
- Hans Zender: Stephen Climax. Gesamtaufnahme. Choeurs & Orchestre du Théâtre Royal de la Monnaie (Brüssel), Sylvain Cambreling (conductor). Academy ACA 8507-2, 1993
- Arnold Schoenberg: Gurre-Lieder. Philharmonisches Orchester Freiburg, Johannes Fritzsch (conductor). Rombach, Freiburg 1997
- Aribert Reimann: Das Schloß. Complete recording (as Wirtin). Bayerisches Staatsorchester, Michael Boder (conductor). Wergo WER 6614-2, 1997

As Dominique

Singles (Polydor)

- 52 607 A Der ewige Soldat – 52 607 B Aber ich wart auf dich – 1966
- 52 695 A Ist das die Welt, die wir mal erben sollen? – 52 695 B Wie es früher war – 1966
- 52 723 A Und was wird morgen sein? – 52 723 B Der Brief von drüben – 1966
- 52 836 A Ich hab in der Liebe kein Glück – 52 836 B Und wieder steht der Sonntag vor der Tür – 1967
- 53 023 A Tausend Straßen – 53 023 B Du lachst mich aus – 1968

Album

- Dominique – Krieg im Frieden – Polydor/Stern-musik Nr. 249078
  - Der ewige Soldat – Saint Marie/Donovan/Colpet
  - Krieg im Land – Stockey/Yarrow/Bader
  - Starfighter-Ballade – Westgard/Bader
  - Schlaf ein – Angelina – Dylan/Bader
  - Das Schlüsselkind – Westgard/Bader
  - Sag' mir, wo die Blumen sind – Seeger/Colpet
  - Der Brief von drüben – Westgard/Bader
  - Zeig mir eine Insel – Westgard/Colpet/Rotter
  - Man geht nicht mehr ohne Doppelkinn Müller/Prottel
  - Die Antwort weiß ganz allein der Wind – Dylan/Bradtke
  - Sergeant Marie – Westgard/Bader
  - Ist das die Welt, die wir mal erben sollen – Scharfenberger/Colpet
