= Das Schloß (opera) =

1992 opera by Aribert Reimann

- Opera by Aribert Reimann
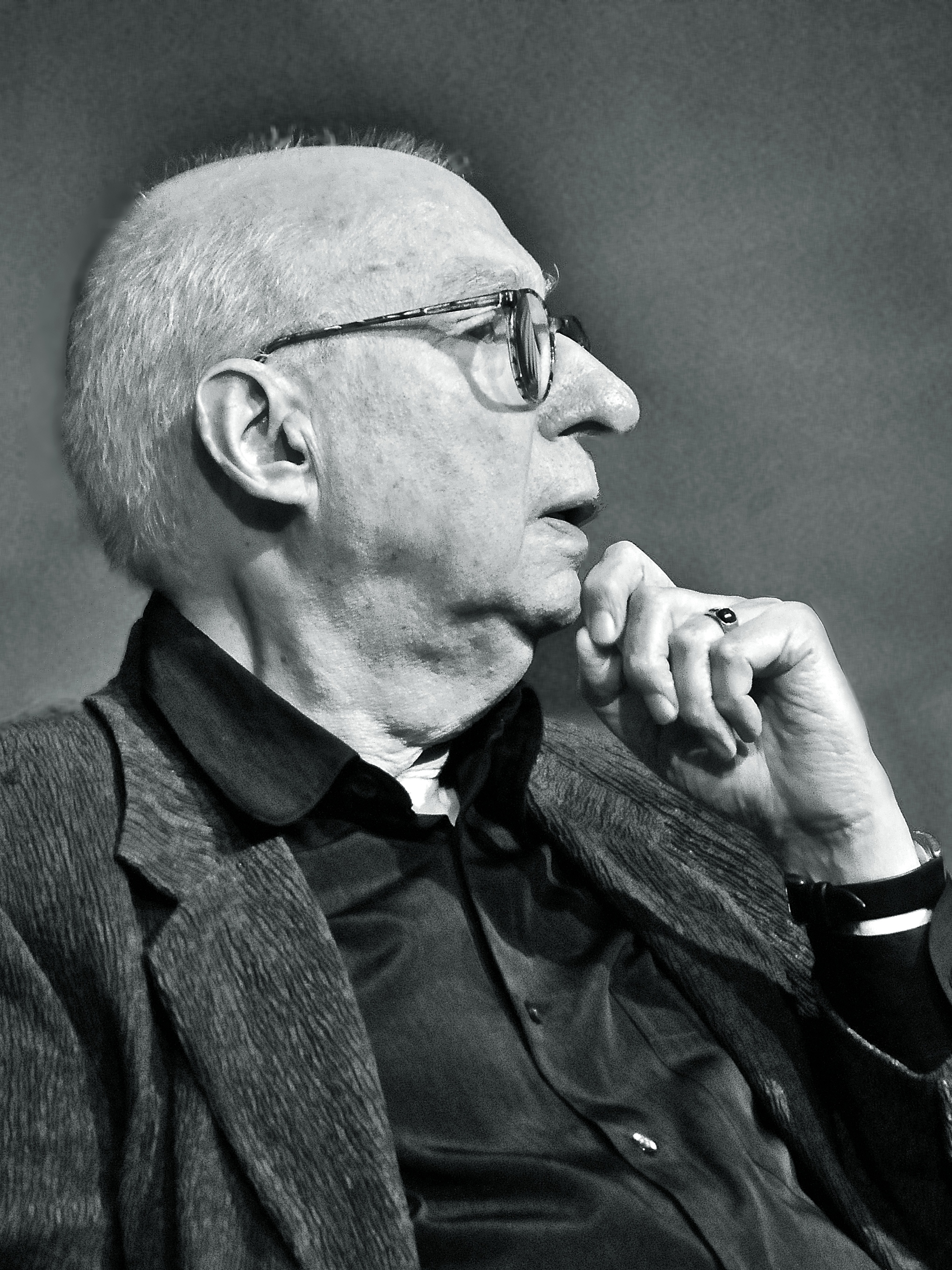
- The composer in 2010
- Language: German
- Based on: Das Schloss by Franz Kafka
- Premiere: 2 September 1992; Deutsche Oper Berlin

Das Schloß (Note: The title was originally Das Schloß, but references, including a recording, often use Das Schloss according to the German orthography from 1996.) (The Castle, literally: The palace) is a 1992 German-language opera by Aribert Reimann. He wrote his own libretto based on Kafka's novel and its dramatization by Max Brod. It premiered on 2 September 1992 at the Deutsche Oper Berlin, staged by Willy Decker and conducted by Michael Boder.

== History ==
Aribert Reimann composed several literary operas, Ein Traumspiel after August Strindberg, Melusine after Ivan Goll, Lear after Shakespeare, Die Gespenstersonate again after Strindberg, and Troades after Euripides. For his sixth opera, Reimann turned to Kafka's novel. As in the earlier works, he wrote his own libretto, this time based on both the novel and its dramatization by Kafka's friend Max Brod. Asked in interview why he turned to the literature of a past time, he said that the topic is timeless: a stranger arrives in a community that rejects him, and an apparatus observes him. Asked about the technical difficulties of his vocal writing, he responded that the lines are written to express emotions and character, as Mozart's Queen of the Night sings virtuoso coloratura for expression, not for superficial glamour.

The opera premiered on 2 September 1992 at the Deutsche Oper Berlin, staged by Willy Decker and conducted by Michael Boder.

== Roles ==
Roles, voice types, premiere cast
| Role | Voice type | Premiere cast 2 September 1992 Conductor: Michael Boder |
|---|---|---|
| K. | baritone | Wolfgang Schöne |
| Wirt (innkeeper) | bass | Friedrich Molsberger |
| Wirtin (his wife) | contralto | Isoldé Elchlepp |
| Schwarzer | bass | Rolf Kühne |
| Bürgel | speaking voice | |
| Barnabas | tenor | Warren Mok |
| Olga | mezzo-soprano | Ute Walther |
| Amalia | soprano | Michal Shamir |
| Adrianne Pieczonka | soprano | Adrianne Pieczonka |
| Wirt | bass-baritone | Gerd Feldhoff |
| Gemeindevorsteher (mayor) | bass | Frido Meyer-Wolff |
| Mizzi | | Johanna Karl-Lory |
| Teacher | tenor | Peter Maus |

== Music ==
A reviewer of the premiere for Die Zeit describes the lines of divided strings as a labyrinth, as a formal reflection of the protagonist's ways in the village that he enters as a stranger with a job mission. The same lines, with rhythmic variations, is repeated in the end, as a frame for the work, and as an image for an endless sound, transcending K.'s death.

The leading role of K. is sung by a baritone in the opera. Reimann wrote the opera, as his earlier ones, for voices. He grew up in a singing family and worked often as an accompanist for singers, and as an academic teacher for singers, which prepared him to consider their requirements in an opera.

== Recording ==
The opera was recorded in 1996, with Richard Salter as K., conducted by Michael Boder, by the label Wergo.
