= Michael Gielen =

Austrian conductor and composer (1927–2019)

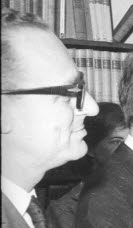
- Gielen in 1965
- Born: Michael Andreas Gielen; 20 July 1927; Dresden, Germany
- Died: 8 March 2019 (aged 91); Mondsee, Austria
- Occupations: Conductor; Composer
- Organizations: Royal Swedish Opera; Oper Frankfurt; Southwest German Radio Symphony Orchestra
- Awards: Hessian Cultural Prize; Theodor W. Adorno Award; Frankfurter Musikpreis; Duisburger Musikpreis; Ernst von Siemens Music Prize; Order of Merit of the Federal Republic of Germany

Michael Andreas Gielen (20 July 1927 – 8 March 2019) was an Austrian conductor and composer known for promoting contemporary music in opera and concert. Principally active in Europe, his performances are characterized by precision and vivacity, aiding his ability to interpret the complex contemporary music he specialized in.

He first worked in Buenos Aires, where he lived with his family between 1938 and 1950. In Europe, he first worked in Vienna and then in Sweden as the Generalmusikdirektor (GMD) of the Royal Swedish Opera. He conducted notable world premieres such as György Ligeti's Requièm, Karlheinz Stockhausen's Carré, and Bernd Alois Zimmermann's opera Die Soldaten and his Requiem für einen jungen Dichter. He directed the Oper Frankfurt from 1977 to 1987, installing more contemporary operas, winning stage directors such as Hans Neuenfels and Ruth Berghaus, and reviving operas such as Schreker's Die Gezeichneten. During his era, the company became one of the leading operas.

Gielen was also principal conductor of the National Orchestra of Belgium (1969–1973), the Cincinnati Symphony Orchestra (1980–1986) and the Southwest German Radio Symphony Orchestra (1986–1999). As a composer, he worked in the tradition of the Second Viennese School, often setting modern literature to music. His works were premiered with performers such as Joan Carroll, Siegfried Palm, Aloys Kontarsky and the LaSalle Quartet.

== Early years ==
Gielen was born in Dresden to Rose (née Steuermann) and Josef Gielen. His father was a theatre and opera director from 1924 at the Staatstheater Dresden, who staged the premiere of Kaiser/Weill's Der Protagonist at the Semperoper in 1926. His mother Rose came from a Jewish family in Sambor (then Austria-Hungary, now Ukraine). She was an actress who had given up acting when their first child Carola was born, but appeared occasionally, for example as a speaker in the premiere of Arnold Schoenberg's Pierrot lunaire in Dresden in 1919, rehearsed with her brother Eduard Steuermann. The football player Zygmunt Steuermann was their younger brother. The boy Michael first attended a reformed school from 1934 until it was closed by the Nazis. Both children were baptized and raised Catholic to counter Nazi indoctrination.

Clemens Krauss called Josef Gielen to the Staatsoper Berlin in 1936, where Michael attended primary school for a year, and then the Kaiserin-Augusta-Gymnasium. When his father's contract was dissolved in 1937, he found a position at the Vienna Burgtheater. The family followed there in 1938. Michael attended a grammar school and took piano lessons. Josef Gielen successfully staged at the Teatro Colón in Buenos Aires, Argentina, in 1938 and 1939, and managed to get immigration papers for his wife and the two children. In 1940, the family left for Argentina, leaving most of their belongings behind.

== Career ==
Gielen began his career as a pianist in Buenos Aires, where he studied with Erwin Leuchter. As a répétiteur at the Teatro Colón at age 20, he played the basso continuo to the recitatives, in the style of the time, in a performance of Bach's St Matthew Passion conducted by Wilhelm Furtwängler. In 1949, he gave an early performance of Arnold Schoenberg's complete piano works. In this period he also shortly studied philosophy.

In 1950, Gielen moved to Vienna where his father had become director of the Burgtheater. Michael Gielen was conductor and répétiteur, who conducted at the Wiener Staatsoper from 1954 to 1960, assisting conductors such as Karl Böhm, Herbert von Karajan and Clemens Krauss. He conducted contemporary music outside the opera house.

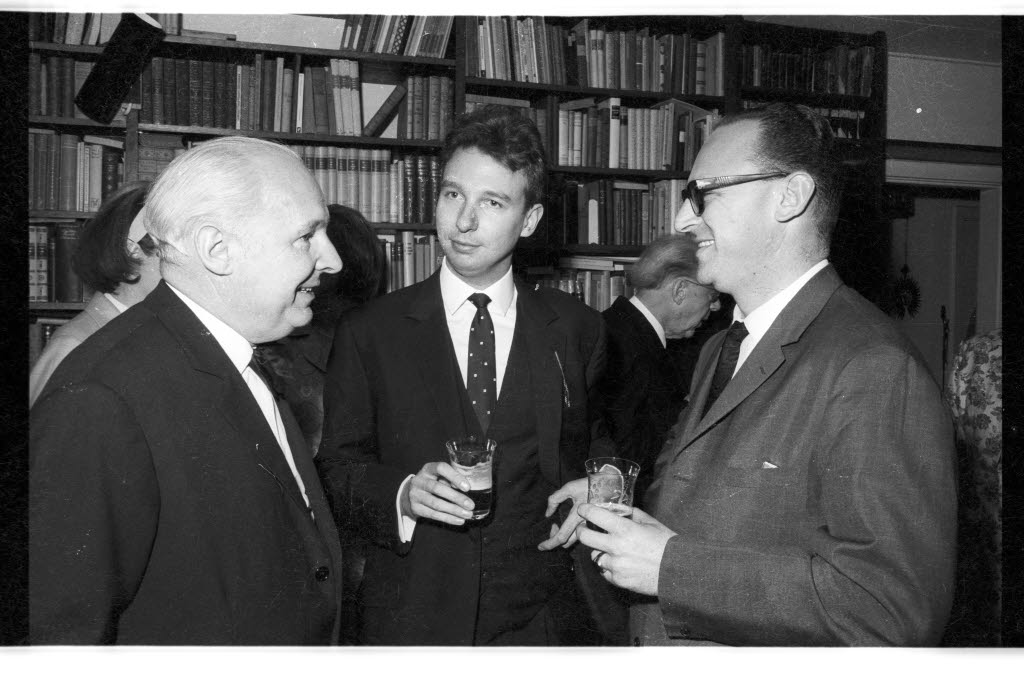
Gielen (right) after the premiere of Ein Traumspiel by Aribert Reimann (centre), June 1965

His next operatic appointment, from 1960, was at the Royal Swedish Opera, where he was Generalmusikdirektor (GMD) for the first time, until 1965. He conducted a production of Stravinsky's The Rake's Progress, which Ingmar Bergman staged as a radicalised Christian Passion (radikalisierte christliche Passion), in the presence of the composer.

He took to freelance conducting in 1965, including the premiere of Bernd Alois Zimmermann's opera Die Soldaten in Cologne that year, a work that had been deemed to be impossible to perform. He premiered Aribert Reimann's opera Ein Traumspiel on 20 June 1965 at the Opernhaus Kiel. He then had a contract with the Netherlands Opera.

From 1977 to 1987, Gielen was GMD at the Oper Frankfurt, where he worked with the dramaturge Klaus Zehelein towards more contemporary operas. In 1979, he revived Franz Schreker's opera Die Gezeichneten there, which had premiered in Frankfurt in 1918. During his time in Frankfurt, later called the Gielen Era, he collaborated with stage directors such as Hans Neuenfels for Verdi's Aida and Ruth Berghaus for Wagner's Der Ring des Nibelungen. The time was described as the Ära Gielen/Zehelein (Gielen/Zehelein era) and made Frankfurt an internationally recognised opera.

Gielen was also principal conductor of the Belgian National Orchestra (1969–73) and the Cincinnati Symphony Orchestra (1980–86). He was from 1986 to 1999 the conductor of the SWR Sinfonieorchester Baden-Baden und Freiburg (Southwest German Radio Symphony Orchestra), and made it known as the leading orchestra for premieres, notably at the Donaueschinger Musiktage. From 1991, he collaborated in Berlin with the Staatsoper Unter den Linden and the Berliner Sinfonie-Orchester (now Konzerthausorchester Berlin).

He demonstrated a mastery of the most complex contemporary scores, and conducted many premieres, including Helmut Lachenmann's Fassade and Klangschatten – mein Saitenspiel, György Ligeti's Requiem, and Karlheinz Stockhausen's Carré. He premiered Zimmermann's Requiem für einen jungen Dichter in Düsseldorf in 1969. In 1973 he recorded Schoenberg's opera Moses und Aron, used as a soundtrack for the film Moses und Aron.

In October 2014, Gielen announced his retirement from conducting for health reasons, particularly seriously deteriorated eyesight. He died in Mondsee, Austria, on 8 March 2019 of pneumonia.

== Recordings ==
With the SWR, Gielen recorded various symphonies, including a complete cycle of both Mahler and Beethoven, as well as select ones by Brahms. Recordings of later composers include works by Bruckner, Stravinsky, Schoenberg, Berg and Webern; his recording of Moses und Aron is its first commercial stereo recording. Among the many works by modern and contemporary composers he recorded were those by Kagel, Ligeti, Nono, Zimmermann and Rihm.

His recordings—and conducting in general—are noted for their relentless precision, exactness and veracity over sentimentality. These characteristics were particularly helpful in performing complex contemporary works.

== Compositions ==
Gielen began to compose in 1946, and kept composing throughout his career as a conductor. He was influenced by the tradition of the Second Viennese School, and his small oeuvre includes settings of poems by Paul Claudel, Stefan George, and Pablo Neruda. His die glocken sind auf falscher spur after Hans Arp was premiered in 1970 with soprano Joan Carroll, cellist Siegfried Palm, pianist Aloys Kontarsky, Wilhelm Bruck, Christoph Caskel and the composer at the Saarländischer Rundfunk festival, "Musik im 20.Jahrhundert" His string quartet Un vieux souvenir after Baudelaire's Les Fleurs du mal, composed from 1983, was premiered in 1985 in Cincinnati by the LaSalle Quartet.

His compositions are listed by the Akademie der Künste:

- 1946 Violin Sonata
- 1948 Der Einsame for bass and piano, after Friedrich Nietzsche
- 1949 Variations for string quartet
- 1950 Chorale variations on "Christus der uns selig macht"
- 1954 Musik 1954 for baritone, strings, piano, timpani and trombone
- 1959 Variationen für 40 Instrumente, four poems by Stefan George for choir and orchestra
- 1960–1963 Pentaphonie "Un dia sobresale" – "Ein Tag tritt hervor" after Pablo Neruda
- 1967–1969 die glocken sind auf falscher spur. Melodramen und Zwischenspiele nach Gedichten von Hans Arp
- 1971–1974 Mitbestimmungsmodell for orchestra players and a conductor
- 1976 Einige Schwierigkeiten bei der Überwindung der Angst for orchestra
- 1983 Un vieux souvenir, string quartet
- 1988 Pflicht und Neigung for winds, percussion and keyboard instruments
- 1989 Rückblick for three cellos
- 1991 Sonata for cello solo
- 2001 Klavierstück in sieben Sätzen for piano

== Awards ==
- 1985: Hessian Cultural Prize
- 1986: Theodor W. Adorno Award
- 1999: Frankfurter Musikpreis
- 2006: Duisburger Musikpreis
- 2010: Ernst von Siemens Music Prize
- June 2010: Knight Commander's Cross of the Order of Merit of the Federal Republic of Germany (Großes Verdienstkreuz mit Stern)

== Sources ==
- Michael Gielen at AllMusic
- Michael Gielen composers21.com
- Michael Gielen (Conductor) Bach Cantatas Website

== Literature ==
- Michael Gielen: Unbedingt Musik. Erinnerungen. Insel, Frankfurt am Main 2005; ISBN 3-458-17272-6.
- Michael Gielen, Paul Fiebig: Mahler im Gespräch. Die zehn Sinfonien. Metzler, Stuttgart 2002; ISBN 3-476-01933-0.

Cultural offices
Preceded by Kazimierz Kord	Chief Conductor, Southwest German Radio Symphony Orchestra; 1986–1999	Succeeded by Sylvain Cambreling
Preceded by Christoph von Dohnányi	General Music Director, Frankfurt Opera; 1977–1987	Succeeded by Gary Bertini
