= Carla Henius =

German opera singer (1919–2002)

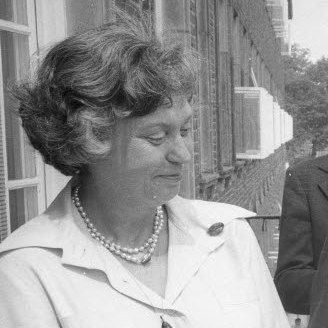
- Carla Henius in 1976
- Born: 4 May 1919; Mannheim, Germany
- Died: 27 December 2002 (aged 83); Murnau am Staffelsee, Germany
- Education: Musikhochschule Berlin
- Occupations: Operatic mezzo-soprano; Librettist; Academic voice teacher
- Organizations: Nationaltheater Mannheim; Musikhochschule Hannover
- Awards: Federal Cross of Merit

Carla Henius (4 May 1919 – 27 December 2002) was a German operatic soprano and mezzo-soprano, voice teacher and librettist. She played a decisive role in promoting recent works by composers such as Arnold Schoenberg, Karlheinz Stockhausen and Luigi Nono for the stage. She wrote the libretto for an opera by Aribert Reimann.

== Career ==
Born in Mannheim, Henius studied at the Musikhochschule Berlin with Hans Emge, Maria Ivogün and Lula Mysz-Gmeiner. She made her debut at the Staatstheater Kassel in 1943, appearing the same year in the title role of Carl Orff's Die Kluge. She was a member of the Staatstheater Darmstadt from 1946, of the Pfalztheater in Kaiserslautern from 1949, and at the Nationaltheater Mannheim from 1951 to 1956, where she appeared in the title role in the premiere of Fred Raymond's operetta Geliebte Manuela in 1951.

She was a lecturer at the Musikhochschule Hannover from 1957, appointed professor in 1962 and teaching until 1966. She kept working as a freelance singer, with a focus on more recent composers. On 13 April 1961, she performed at La Fenice in Venice in the premiere of Luigi Nono's Intolleranza 1960. She appeared at the Piccola Scala in Milan in 1965 in the premiere of Giacomo Manzoni's opera Atomtod. Her repertoire contained music from Arnold Schoenberg to Karlheinz Stockhausen and Luigi Nono, and she performed in operas by Boris Blacher, Werner Egk, Gottfried von Einem and Gerhard Wimberger.

Dieter Schnebel composed for her in 1970/71, Atemzüge, für mehrere Stimmorgane und Reproduktionsgeräte, which she premiered in November 1971 in Rome, with Gisela Saur-Kontarsky and William Pearson. She was the vocal soloist in a 1961 recording of Le Marteau sans maître by Pierre Boulez, with flutist Severino Gazzelloni, violist Dino Asciolla, percussionist Leonida Torrebruno, conducted by Bruno Maderna.

Henius was married to the intendant of the Opernhaus Kiel, Joachim Klaiber. He proposed from 1963, first with Peter Ronnefeld, then with Hans Zender, to devote a third of the program to contemporary opera. Henius was called 1977 to the Musiktheater im Revier in Gelsenkirchen by the new Intendant, Claus Leininger to form and direct a musik-theater-werkstatt (Music Theatre Workshop). When Leininger moved to the Hessisches Staatstheater Wiesbaden, she followed and directed a similar institution for new operas there.

She died in Murnau am Staffelsee.

== Awards ==
In 1987, she was awarded the Kultur- und Wissenschaftspreis der Stadt Kiel. In 1991, she received the Federal Cross of Merit. In 1996, she was awarded the Kulturpreis der Landeshauptstadt Wiesbaden. A street in Wiesbaden is named after her.

== Work ==
- Ein Traumspiel (1964). Opera libretto after Strindberg's A Dream Play, translated by Peter Weiss. Music: Aribert Reimann. Premiere 20 June 1965 at the Opernhaus Kiel.

== Literature ==
- Jürg Stenzl (ed.): Carla Henius und Luigi Nono. Briefe, Tagebücher, Notizen. Europäische Verlagsanstalt, Hamburg 1995 ISBN 3-434-50071-5
