= Ein Traumspiel =

Opera by Aribert Reimann

- Opera by Aribert Reimann
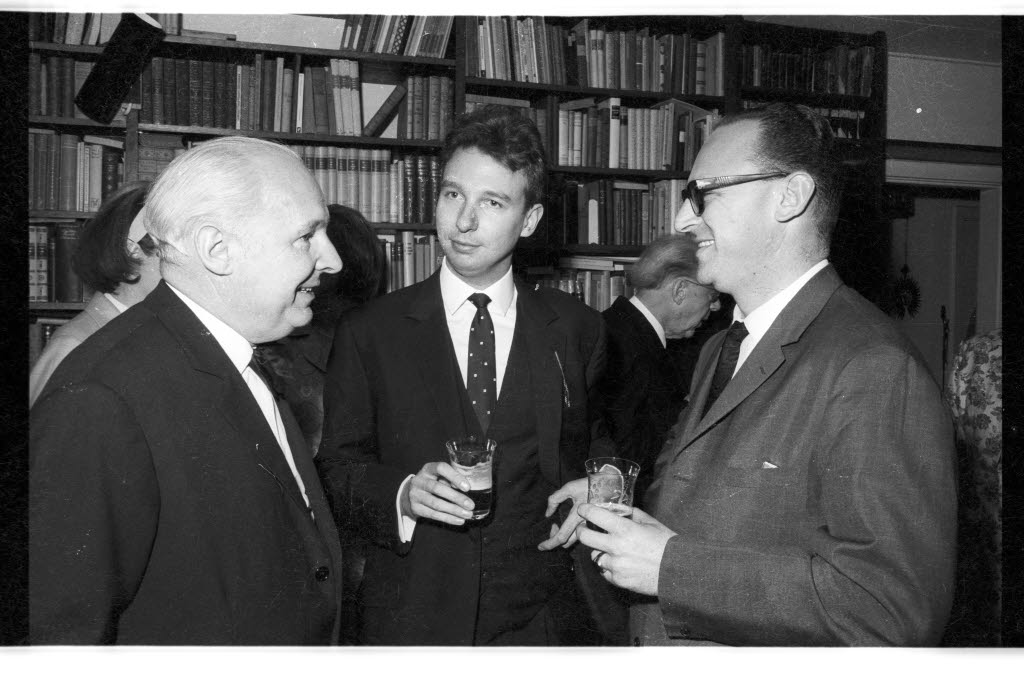
- After the premiere in June 1965, with director Joachim Klaiber (left), Reimann (centre) and conductor Michael Gielen (right)
- Language: German
- Based on: A Dream Play by August Strindberg
- Premiere: 20 June 1965; Opernhaus Kiel

Ein Traumspiel is a German-language opera by Aribert Reimann after the 1901 play A Dream Play (Swedish: Ett drömspel) by August Strindberg. Carla Henius arranged the translation to German by Peter Weiss for a libretto. Reimann composed the opera in 1963 and 1964 on a commission from Theater Kiel. It was premiered at the Opernhaus Kiel on 20 June 1965, staged by Joachim Klaiber and conducted by Michael Gielen. Gielen stepped in for the Generalmusikdirektor who was ill.
