= Kieth Engen =

American opera singer

- Born: Keith Sheldon Engen; 5 April 1925; Frazee, Minnesota, U.S.
- Died: 2 September 2004 (aged 79); Murnau am Staffelsee, Germany
- Other name: Stan Oliver
- Occupation: Opera singer (bass)

Kieth Engen (5 April 1925 – 2 September 2004) was an American operatic bass who was a member of Munich's Bavarian State Opera for decades. Although his career was based in Munich, he appeared internationally as a guest singer at major opera houses and festivals and performed and recorded many of Bach's Passion oratorios and cantatas, primarily with the conductor Karl Richter. He was born Keith Sheldon Engen in Frazee, Minnesota, and died in Murnau am Staffelsee, Germany at the age of 79. He was given the title of Kammersänger in 1962 and was a recipient of the Bavarian Order of Merit. In the mid-1950s he also had a brief parallel career as a pop singer under the pseudonym Stan Oliver.

== Biography ==
=== Early life ===
Engen was born in Frazee, Minnesota. He came from a musical family and acquired his love for singing as a young boy. His grandfather had been a conductor and his mother was a singer and singing teacher. He graduated from Berkeley High School and then went to the University of California. He studied business administration there without much enthusiasm, but on the side studied singing with Amy McMurray who had trained in Germany under Lilli Lehmann. After leaving university, he studied German language and literature in Zürich on a two-year scholarship. When he returned to California he sang in local concerts and recitals and worked in a warehouse and as a chorus assistant to save enough money to train as an opera singer in Europe. Engen entered Vienna's Wiener Musikakademie in 1951 where he studied under Elisabeth Radó, Tino Pattiera, and the bass Pavel Ludikar, who also became his friend and role model. His first name was originally "Keith", but after several years in Germany, he changed the spelling to "Kieth" to conform to German phonetics.

=== Singing career ===
Engen made his operatic debut in 1952 at the Graz Opera as Monterone in Rigoletto and sang various roles with the company during that season, including Zaccaria in Nabucco. It was in Graz that he met his future wife, the actress Erika Berghöfer. They married in 1953. At the time, she was a member of the Burgtheater's company in Vienna. In order to remain near her, Engen spent the next two years in Vienna singing in the American musical revues produced by the United States Information Service and staged by Marcel Prawy under the slogan "So singt Amerika" (So sings America).

His first appearance at the Bavarian State Opera came in 1954 as Bluebeard in Bartok's Bluebeard's Castle. In a March 2000 interview, Engen said that his height had got him the role. According to Engen, Hertha Töpper, who was singing Judith in the opera, was a tall woman, and the director insisted on an equally tall Bluebeard. In 1955, he became a permanent member of company and went on to perform there until his retirement in 1996, appearing 2122 times in over 125 roles of the bass repertoire. His last appearance was as the Gemeindevorsteher in Reimann's opera Das Schloß. In recognition of his accomplishments he was given the title Kammersänger in 1962 and later the Bavarian Order of Merit.

In the course of his career, Engen sang most of the leading bass roles. In addition to the title role in Bluebeard's Castle and Zaccaria in Nabucco, these included: the Mozart roles of Count Almaviva in Le nozze di Figaro, Sarastro in Die Zauberflöte, and the title role in Don Giovanni; Rocco and Don Fernando in Beethoven's Fidelio; Marke in Wagner's Tristan und Isolde and Hunding in his Die Walküre; Tommaso in D'Albert's Tiefland, La Roche in Richard Strauss's Capriccio and the Music Master in his Ariadne auf Naxos; the Sultan in Rossini's Il Turco in Italia; Enrico in Donizetti's Anna Bolena; Ramfis in Verdi's Aida; Mephisto in Gounod's Faust; and the Doctor in Alban Berg's Wozzeck.

Although his career was primarily based in Munich, Engen also appeared as a guest singer in other German opera houses and internationally. He appeared at the Bayreuth Festival in 1958 as Heinrich in Wieland Wagner's production of Lohengrin and at the Salzburg Festival in 1962 as Achior in Mozart's Betulia liberata. He performed several times as a guest artist at the Vienna State Opera from 1955 to 1972 and made his US debut in 1961 as Raymond Bidebent in San Francisco Opera's production of Lucia di Lammermoor. During that season he also appeared there as Count Almaviva in Le nozze di Figaro, Don Fernando in Fidelio, Fritz Kothner in Die Meistersinger von Nürnberg , Varlaam in Boris Godunov, and Quince in A Midsummer Night's Dream. Further international appearances included London's Royal Opera House (1956 and 1968), La Monnaie in Brussels (1963), the Paris Opera (1963 and 1989), and the Teatro Colón in Buenos Aires (1967). He also appeared at the Maggio Musicale Fiorentino and the Edinburgh Festival.

Engen took part in several world premieres, singing Emperor Rudolf in Hindemith's Die Harmonie der Welt (1957), Alexandre Dumas in Norman Dello Joio's Blood Moon (1961), Oceanus in Carl Orff's Prometheus (1968), Senatspräsident in Volker David Kirchner's Belshazar (1986), and the Czar in Penderecki's Ubu Rex (1991).

From 1956, Engen performed and recorded many of Bach's works with the Münchener Bach-Chor, conducted by Karl Richter; He was the soloist in Richter's first recording of the Kreuzstab Cantata for bass solo in 1957, among many cantatas, and he was the vox Christi (voice of Christ) in both the St. John Passion (1960 and 1964) and the St. Matthew Passion (1958), while singing the work's bass arias in a 1969 recording.

In the mid-1950s Engen had a brief parallel career in Germany as a pop singer under the pseudonym "Stan Oliver". He made several recordings on the Polydor label which entered the German charts. These included "Ein Haus in Havanna" (A House in Havana) and '"Das Geisterschiff von Ohio" (The Ghost Ship from Ohio). He also sang under that name in the light comedy films Das alte Försterhaus (1956) and Der kühne Schwimmer (1957).

=== Later years ===
In his retirement years, Engen taught singing and served on the juries of singing competitions. He died at the age of 79 in Murnau am Staffelsee, where he and his wife had lived since 1972. His obituary in Der Spiegel described him as inquisitive, secure in style and intelligent. (Note: Original German quote: "neugierig, stilsicher und intelligent") Ronald Adler, former artistic director at the Bavarian State Opera and longtime friend of Engen, wrote that his personality was marked by unwavering benevolence, kindness, and serene wisdom with a focus that was always on the essential—love of music, life and people. (Note: Original German quote: "sein unerschütterliches Wohlmut, seine eigene Güte und seine gelassene Weisheit geprägt. In ihm wurde immer die Konzentration auf das Wesentliche, den Ausschluss des Trivialen, die Liebe zur Musik, zum Leben und zum Menschen erleben.")

== Discography ==
Engen's discography includes:

Opera

- Beethoven: Fidelio (as Don Fernando). Bayerisches Staatsorchester, Ferenc Fricsay (conductor). Recorded 1957. Label: Deutsche Grammophon
- Janáček: Die Ausflüge des Herrn Brouček (as Würfl). Bayerische Staatsorchester, Joseph Keilberth (conductor). Recorded 1959. Label: Orfeo
- Nicolai: Die lustigen Weiber von Windsor (as Herr Reich). Bayerisches Staatsorchester, Robert Heger (conductor). Recorded 1963. Label: EMI Electrola
- Orff: Prometheus (as Okeanos). Kölner Rundfunk Sinfonie Orchester, Herbert Schernus (conductor). Recorded 1972. Label: Philips
- Orff: Antigonae (as Chor-Führer). Bavarian Radio Symphony Orchestra, Ferdinand Leitner (conductor). Recorded 1961. Label: Deutsche Grammophon
- Orff: Oedipus der Tyrann (as Kreon). Bavarian Radio Symphony Orchestra, Rafael Kubelik (conductor). Recorded 1966. Label: Deutsche Grammophon
- Wagner: Lohengrin (as König Heinrich). Orchester der Bayreuther Festspiele, André Cluytens (conductor). Recorded 1958. Label: Archipel

Oratorio and sacred music

- Bach: Cantatas BWV 67, BWV 108 and BWV 127 (bass soloist). Münchner Bach-Chor, Bayerisches Staatsorchester, Karl Richter (conductor). Recorded c.1959. Label: Teldec
- Bach: Christmas Oratorio (bass soloist). Wiener Symphoniker, Hans Swarowsky (conductor). Recorded 1968. Label: Concert Hall
- Bach: Mass in B minor (bass soloist). Münchener Bach-Orchester, Karl Richter (conductor). Recorded 1961. Label: Archiv Produktion
- Bach: St John Passion (bass soloist). Bavarian Radio Symphony Orchestra, Eugen Jochum (conductor). Recorded 1960. Label: Andromeda
- Bach: St John Passion (bass soloist). Münchener Bach-Orchester, Karl Richter (conductor). Recorded 1964. Label: Deutsche Grammophon
- Bach: St Matthew Passion (as vox Christi). Münchener Bach-Orchester, Karl Richter (conductor). Recorded 1958. Label: Deutsche Grammophon
- Mozart: Mass in C major, "Spatzenmesse" (bass soloist). Bavarian Radio Symphony Orchestra, Rafael Kubelik (conductor). Recorded c.1973. Label: Deutsche Grammophon
- Mozart: Requiem (bass soloist). Orchestra of the Wiener Staatsoper, Pierre Colombo (conductor). Recorded c.1965. Label: Concert Hall
