= Kiel Opera House =

Kiel Opera House may refer to:

- Stifel Theatre, formerly Kiel Opera House, in St Louis, Missouri, United States
- Opernhaus Kiel, an opera house in Kiel, Germany
