= Ubu Rex =

1991 opera by Krzysztof Penderecki

- Opera by Krzysztof Penderecki
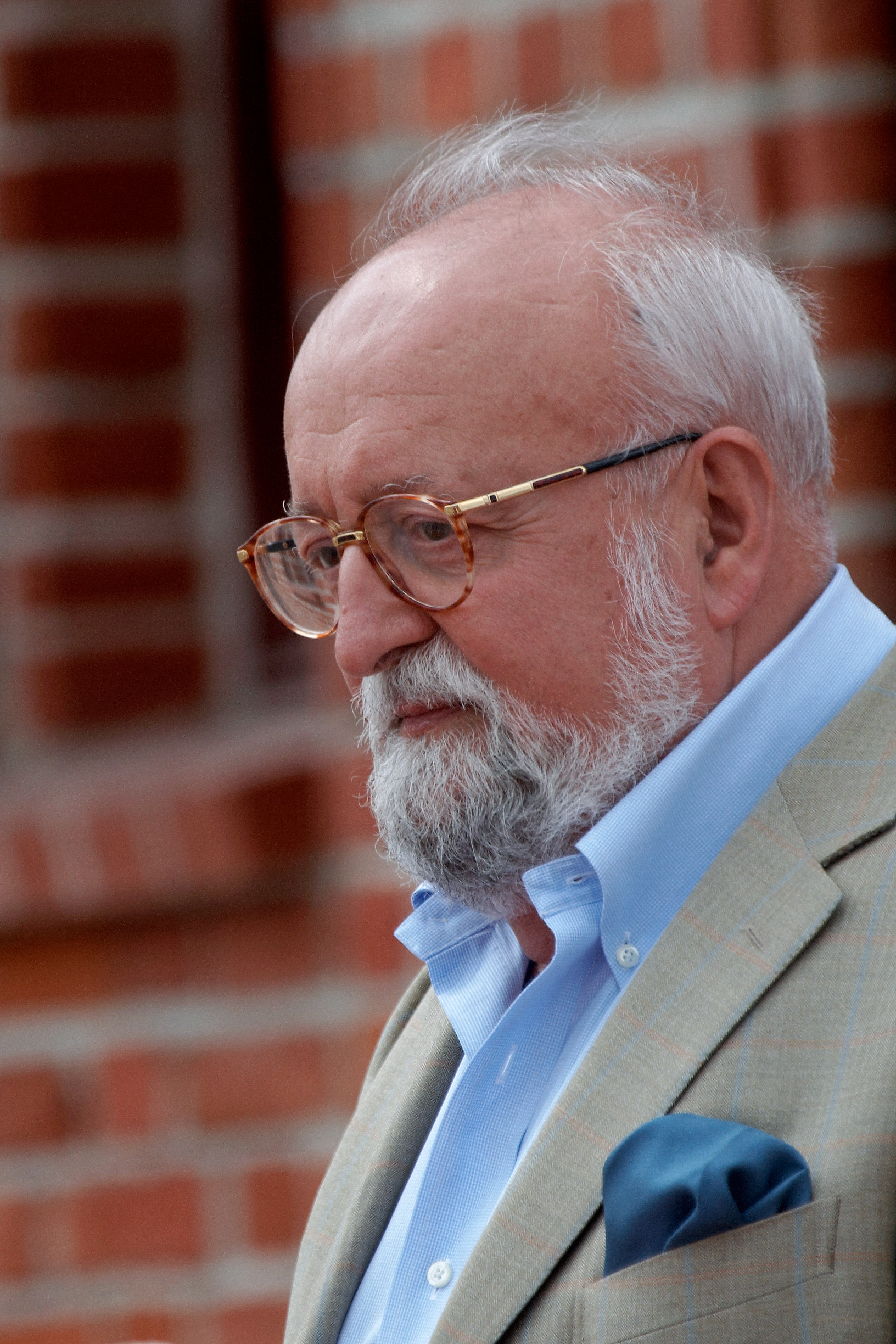
- The composer in 2008
- Librettist: Penderecki; Jerzy Jarocki
- Language: German
- Based on: Ubu Roi by Alfred Jarry
- Premiere: 6 July 1991; Munich Opera Festival

Ubu Rex is a satirical opera by Krzysztof Penderecki, on a libretto in German by the composer and Jerzy Jarocki, based on Alfred Jarry's 1896 play Ubu Roi. It uses models by Offenbach, Rossini, Shostakovich and Schnittke. The opera was premiered by the Bavarian State Opera on 6 July 1991 for the opening of the Munich Opera Festival, conducted by Michael Boder. The Polish premiere was 1993 in Grand Theatre, Łódź, conducted by Antoni Wicherek and directed by Lech Majewski.

== History ==
Penderecki was interested for a long time in an opera based on Alfred Jarry's 1896 surrealist play Ubu Roi, but realized that the topic of satire of power and corruption was not welcome in the restricted political surroundings he lived in. Over two decades, it was announced several times but then cancelled. Penderecki wrote the German language libretto together with Jerzy Jarocki. The libretto is a compact version of the play, being faithful to its "exuberantly vulgar vision of a world taken over by the lowest form of bourgeois avarice and greed". The composer labeled the work an opera buffa. It was his first and only comic and satirical opera, and uses models by Jacques Offenbach, Gioachino Rossini, Dmitri Shostakovich and Alfred Schnittke. The composer wrote: "To write a comic opera one has to not only have experienced a lot, but also be able to look at these experiences with perspective. One must be able to laugh at oneself, something that cannot be done at the age of thirty."

The opera was premiered by the Bavarian State Opera on 6 July 1991 for the opening of the annual Munich Opera Festival. The score and parts were delivered to the orchestra only on the very day of the premiere. It was staged by the company's Intendant, August Everding, and conducted by Michael Boder. The cast was led by the character tenor Robert Tear in the title role, mezzo-soprano Doris Soffel as Mother Ubu, soprano Pamela Coburn as Queen Rosamunde. It was not well received by the audience and the press. The opera was published by Schott.

Ubu Rex was given in Poland first in 2003 at the Wielki Theatre in Warsaw, in a performance that was also presented in London, and was recorded. Jacek Kaspszyk conducted chorus and orchestra of the theatre. The opera was produced in Gdansk on the occasion of the composer's 80th birthday in 2013, a production that was also shown that year at the Musikfestspiele Saar in Kaiserslautern and in Saarbrücken.

The military marches from the opera were arranged as a suite for brass.

== Roles ==
Roles, voice types, premiere cast
Role	Voice type	Premiere cast Conductor: Michael Boder
Father Ubu (the king's son)	character tenor	Robert Tear
Mother Ubu	coloratura mezzo-soprano	Doris Soffel
King Wenzel	bass buffo	Hermann Becht
Queen Rosamunde	soprano	Pamela Coburn
Boleslaus (the king's son)	soprano	
Ladislaus (the king's son)	soprano	
Bougrelas (the king's son)	tenor	
Csar (double role)	2 basses	Kieth Engen and Guido Götzen
others		

== Plot ==
The opera is a fairly faithful adaption of the Alfred Jarry's play Ubu Roi, which is itself a parody of William Shakespeare's tragedies (particularly Macbeth, Hamlet and King Lear), combining the subject of bloody power struggles with comedic and absurdist elements. The story centers around the titular Ubu, an ambitious but physically unintimidating and cowardly captain in service to the King Wenceslaus of Poland. Wenceslaus being deeply unpopular as the result of a poorly executed war between Poland and Russia, Ubu's wife convinces him to kill the king and usurp his throne. The power-hungry and amoral Ubu is won over by the plan and quickly sets about recruiting unscrupulous members of the king's court, chiefly fellow captain Bordure. The coup is completely successful, and the king is murdered, but his wife and his son, Crown Prince Bougrelas, escape, although the queen dies shortly after.

Ubu uses most of the treasury to shower the common people with wealth and buy their loyalty to his rule with increasingly opulent displays. The new king then sets about slowly isolating and slaughtering many of the other powerful figures in Poland, including the most influential members of the nobility, the judiciary, and the nation's financial ministers and administrators, all to feed his continuing greed for wealth and a desire for complete control of the state. He eventually turns even upon his allies, killing key figures of the revolution and imprisoning Bordure. When even these moves fail to satiate his need for wealth and power, he begins levying crippling taxes upon the common people.

Meanwhile, Prince Bougrelas has traveled to Russia and secured an alliance with the Czar, who agrees to use his army to help restore Bougrelas to power. Bougrelas returns to Poland ahead of the army and incites revolution against the now deeply unpopular Ubu. Ubu's wife conspires to steal hidden wealth from the palace, but is thwarted by Bougrelas. Meanwhile, Ubu and his remaining lieutenants engage in a series of battles with the Czar, but despite some initial success, are routed. Ubu returns to the capital where Bordure is executed. Ubu, his wife, and the remainder of their retinue then flee the country on a ship, intending to settle "anywhere worthy enough to accept us".
