= Arnold Schönberg Center =

Museum in Vienna, Austria

- Location: Vienna, Austria
- Coordinates: 48°11′56″N 16°22′38″E
- Type: Arnold Schönberg repository
- Website: www.schoenberg.at

The Arnold Schönberg Center, established in 1998 in Vienna, is a repository of Arnold Schönberg's archival legacy and a cultural center that is open to the public.

== Activities ==
Archive and library, exhibitions, concerts, lectures, workshops and symposia make it possible to become familiar with Schönberg's world and that of his contemporaries. Schönberg's study with the original furniture and work tools can be viewed at the Center year-round. The Center publishes regularly, and in particular, produces the periodical Journal of the Arnold Schönberg Center. A catalogue raisonné of Schoenberg's paintings and drawings has also been published. The Center regularly awards an international Arnold Schönberg Prize.

The archive is open all year-round to scholars, composers, musicians and the general public. The collection comprises more than 20,000 pages of music and text manuscripts, historical photographs, personal documents, diaries, concert programs, Schönberg's library, memorabilia and instruments, as well as copies and scans of the worldwide inventory of Schönbergiana. The website of the center contains high-resolution scans of all available autographs, paintings and letters, and additionally offers the complete works and voice recordings as streaming audio.

== History ==
Arnold Schönberg's legacy remained in the possession of his heirs after his death in 1951 and was administered by his widow Gertrud Schoenberg until 1967. In the 1970s, Schönberg's heirs decided to make the collection available to the Arnold Schoenberg Institute of the University of Southern California in Los Angeles where a modern archive was established along with a concert hall and an exhibition hall. That archive was open to the public until 1997. Leonard Stein, who had studied with Schoenberg, was the director of the institute. During its 25-year history, the institute was consulted by thousands of researchers, artists, students and music-lovers.

Towards the end of this period, the University of Southern California felt it could no longer fulfill the condition of Schönberg's heirs that the Institute and archive be limited exclusively to research and studies about Arnold Schönberg, triggering off a legal battle between them and the University in 1996. Many cities, universities and private people were interested in giving the orphaned collection a new home: New York, Vienna, Berlin, The Hague, Basel, Yale, Stanford, Harvard, Arizona and even in Los Angeles, the Getty Center and the University of California Los Angeles.

Vienna, as the city in which Schoenberg was born and the birthplace and namesake of the Viennese School, was chosen: in early 1997 the Arnold Schönberg Center Privatstiftung was founded by the City of Vienna together with the Internationale Schönberg-Gesellschaft.

The purposes of the Foundation include establishing the Arnold Schönberg Archives (legacy) in Vienna, its maintenance and preservation, the education of the public with regard to Schönberg's interdisciplinary artistic influence, as well as teaching and publicizing Schönberg's contributions to music and other achievements. The purposes of the Foundation shall be achieved by making the Schoenberg legacy accessible and available for scholarly study and research by scholars, composers, musicians, and the general public; regularly organizing exhibitions, concerts, and other events; holding symposia and conferences devoted to the life and work of Arnold Schönberg; exhibiting paintings and drawings by Arnold Schönberg, which have been made available to the Foundation by their owners as a long-term loan.

== Schönberg House in Mödling ==
In March 1997, as one of its founders, the International Schönberg Society deeded Arnold Schönberg's residence in Mödling (1918–1925) to the newly founded Arnold Schönberg Center Private Foundation. The house, which is a living monument for the intellectual activity of Schönberg's Viennese circle, contains a museum (open to the public since September 1999).

== See also ==
- List of music museums
