= Frankfurter Musikpreis =

German music award

The Frankfurter Musikpreis was awarded from 1982 to 2020 by the joint foundation of the Musikmesse Frankfurt and the National Association of German Musical Instruments Manufacturers. The aim of this international music award is to highlight "personalities from the world of music for special achievements in the fields of interpretation, composition, musicology, teaching and services to music making" (according to its self description). The award was presented annually and alternately to personalities from the world of music in the fields of popular music and classical music. It was endowed with 15,000 euros. The awards ceremony took place on the eve of the Musikmesse and Prolight + Sound in Frankfurt am Main.

== Laureates ==
- 1982: Gidon Kremer
- 1983: Edgar Krapp
- 1984: Alfred Brendel
- 1985: Brigitte Fassbaender
- 1986: Albert Mangelsdorff
- 1987: Carl Dahlhaus
- 1988: Heinz Holliger
- 1989: Ludwig Güttler
- 1990: Chick Corea
- 1991: Aribert Reimann
- 1992: Georg Solti
- 1993: Harry Kupfer
- 1994: Brian Eno
- 1995: Tabea Zimmermann
- 1996: Wolfgang Niedecken
- 1997: Hans Zender
- 1998: Peter Herbolzheimer
- 1999: Michael Gielen
- 2000: Klaus Doldinger
- 2001: Dietrich Fischer-Dieskau
- 2002: no award
- 2003: Walter Levin
- 2004: Udo Lindenberg
- 2005: György Ligeti
- 2006: Peter Gabriel
- 2007: Péter Eötvös
- 2008: Paquito D’Rivera
- 2009: José Antonio Abreu
- 2010: Keith Emerson
- 2011: Anne Sofie von Otter
- 2012: John McLaughlin
- 2013: Marie-Luise Neunecker
- 2014: Ernie Watts
- 2015: Peter Sadlo
- 2016: Al Jarreau
- 2017: David Garrett
- 2018: Bundesjazzorchester
- 2019: Quatuor Ébène
- 2020: Peter Maffay and his band
