= Victor von Halem =

German operatic bass (1940–2022)

- Born: 26 March 1940; Berlin, Brandenburg, Prussia, Germany
- Died: 28 May 2022 (aged 82); Berlin, Germany
- Education: Musikhochschule München
- Occupation: Opera singer (bass)
- Organizations: Deutsche Oper Berlin
- Title: Kammersänger

Victor von Halem (26 March 1940 – 28 May 2022) was a German operatic bass. He was a member of the Deutsche Oper Berlin for nearly 30 years as well as a guest singer in the major opera houses and festivals of Europe and North America. He sang a wide repertoire encompassing over 100 roles, including King Philipp in Verdi's Don Carlo and Hans Sachs in Wagner's Die Meistersinger von Nürnberg.

== Life and career ==
Von Halem was born in Berlin but spent his childhood in Portugal and Italy. He studied singing at the Musikhochschule München under Else Domberger. Recommended by Herbert von Karajan, he made his stage debut in 1965 at the Deutsche Oper Berlin, and was a member of the company for the next 30 years, singing many leading bass roles and described as "a defining singer" of the house. His roles included Sarastro in Mozart's Die Zauberflöte, Rocco in Beethoven's Fidelio, Saint-Bris in Meyerbeer's Les Huguenots. Verdi's Ramfis in Aida and King Philipp in Don Carlo, Wagner's Gurnemanz in Parsifal, Hagen in Götterdämmerung, King Marke in Tristan und Isolde, König Heinrich in Lohengrin. He appeared in the 1979 world premiere of Wilhelm Dieter Siebert's opera Der Untergang der Titanic.

The New York Times critic Harold C. Schonberg, who had seen von Halem in a 1975 performance of Mussorgsky's Boris Godunov at the Deutsche Oper described him as "a giant of a man with a voice to match".

As a guest singer von Halem made his debut at the Vienna Staatsoper in 1978 as The Grand Inquisitor in Verdi's Don Carlo, a role he would reprise at San Francisco Opera in 1998 and the Paris Opera in 2010. He made his La Scala debut in 1994 as Hunding in Wagner's Die Walküre. His other Wagnerian roles included Gurnemanz at the Spoleto Festival of 1987, Hans Sachs in Die Meistersinger von Nürnberg there in 1992, Hermann in Tannhäuser at the San Francisco Opera in 1994, the title role in Der fliegende Holländer at the Detroit Opera in 1997, and Titurel in Parsifal at the Paris Opera in 2008 and at La Monnaie in Brussels in 2011.. Nigel Jamieson wrote of his role debut as Hans Sachs in The Times:

Victor von Halem was singing Hans Sachs for the first time but no-one could have guessed. He has everything the part demands: his warm, soft-grained bass flows easily through all Sachs's music, he points the words with a Lieder-singer's sensitivity, and his towering stature commands authority while conveying gentleness and humility. There is surely no finer Sachs today.

Von Halem also performed in operetta, musical and chanson, such as Caiaphas in Jesus Christ Superstar and Zsupan in Der Zigeunerbaron by Johann Strauss, both performed at the Theater des Westens.

After his retirement from the Deutsche Oper company in 1995, von Halem continued to sing as a guest performer at both the Deutsche Oper and the Berlin State Opera as well as in other German and foreign opera houses. In April 2016 the Senate of Berlin awarded him the title of Kammersänger for his life's work in the city's opera houses. In June of that year he appeared at the Renaissance-Theater in Berlin with Karan Armstrong, René Kollo, and Ute Walther in a production of Ronald Harwood's Quartet, a play about four opera singers living in a retirement home for musicians. Von Halem returned to the opera stage in 2017 as Orest's tutor in Elektra at Opéra de Lyon.

He recorded several complete operas, such as Die Meistersinger, Parsifal (as Titurel), Puccini's Tosca, La Damnation de Faust by Berlioz (as Brander), Der Rosenkavalier and Capriccio by Richard Strauss, Schreker's Der ferne Klang and Zemlinsky's Der Traumgörge. He recorded Beethoven's Christus am Ölberge, sacred music by Hugo Wolf, and a collection Humor im Lied of humorous lieder from Bach to Peter Cornelius.

Von Halem died in Berlin at age 82 after a long illness.
