= Willy Decker =

German theatre director

- Born: 1950 (age 75–76); Cologne, Germany
- Occupations: theatre director; opera producer
- Awards: Chevalier des Arts et des Lettres, 2001

Willy Decker (born 1950) is a German theatre director and opera producer. He staged the world premières of Hans Werner Henze's Pollicino in Montepulciano in 1980, of Antonio Bibalo's Macbeth for the Norwegian Opera in Oslo in 1990 and Aribert Reimann's Das Schloss (The Castle) at the Deutsche Oper Berlin in 1992.

== Life ==
Decker was born in Cologne in 1950. He was educated first at the Rheinische Musikschule in Cologne where he studied violin, and then at the University of Cologne and the Hochschule für Musik Köln, where he studied philosophy, theatre, music, and singing. He started work as an assistant director in Essen and also at the Cologne State Opera, where before long he was made artistic director.

He was made a Chevalier of the Ordre des Arts et des Lettres in 2011.

== Work ==
Decker has directed new opera productions for major European opera houses, as well as for San Francisco Opera and Lyric Opera of Chicago. He made his Salzburg Festival debut in 2004 directing the Die tote Stadt of Erich Wolfgang Korngold, and returned in 2005 for a new production of La traviata starring Thomas Hampson, Anna Netrebko and Rolando Villazón.

In 2005 he was made an honorary professor in musical theatre direction at the Hochschule für Musik Hanns Eisler in Berlin. From 2009 to 2011 he was the artistic director of the Ruhrtriennale Festival.

In 2010, he presented Wagner's Flying Dutchman at the Bastille Opera in Paris, and "Tristan und Isolde" in Hong Kong.
