= Ute Walther =

German operatic mezzo-soprano (1942–2026)

- Walther onstage in the 1980s
- Born: 23 June 1942; Jena, Thuringia, Germany
- Died: 6 June 2026 (aged 83)
- Education: Musikhochschule Berlin
- Occupation: Operatic mezzo-soprano
- Organizations: Staatsoper Dresden; Deutsche Oper Berlin
- Title: Kammersängerin

Ute Walther (23 June 1942 – 6 June 2026) was a German operatic mezzo-soprano. She was a long-term member of the Staatsoper Dresden, where she portrayed the title role of Der Rosenkavalier by R. Strauss in the opening performances of the restored Semperoper in February 1985. She was then from 1986 to 2007 a member of the Deutsche Oper Berlin, with international guest appearances, regularly at the Vienna State Opera.

== Life and career ==
Walther was born in Jena on 23 June 1942; her mother was a singer, and her father a conductor. Her father died in 1945. She studied voice at the Musikhochschule Berlin with Alois Orth and Adelheid Müller-Hess. She made her stage debut in 1968 at the Staatstheater Schwerin in the title role of Der Rosenkavalier by R. Strauss. She moved on to the Volkstheater Rostock in 1974 where she remained until 1980.

Walther was then engaged by the Staatsoper Dresden. She appeared as the Composer in Ariadne auf Naxos by Strauss in June 1982, directed by Joachim Herz and conducted by Siegfried Kurz, followed by Ortrud in Wagner's Lohengrin in a new production directed by Christine Mielitz. She performed as a guest at the Bolshoi Theatre in Moscow, at the Edinburgh Festival in 1982 as the Composer and in Lisbon and Madrid. In the 1983/84 season she performed at the Berlin State Opera several times.

Walther portrayed the Rosenkavalier again in February 1985 as part of the opening performances of the restored Semperoper. In a telecast production staged by Joachim Herz and conducted by Hans Vonk, she performed alongside Ana Pusar as the Marschallin, Margot Stejskal as Sophie and Theo Adam as Ochs. Reviewers noted her playing of a three-dimensional believable character and her mellifluous voice especially in the ensembles. In April 1985 Walther portrayed the Rosenkavalier at the Vienna State Opera, where she later appeared as the Composer, as Fricka in Wagner's Die Walküre and as Prinz Orlofsky in Die Fledermaus by J. Strauss. She participated in a tour of the company to Japan. In 1985, she appeared in Dresden as Magdalene in a new production of Wagner's Die Meistersinger von Nürnberg, conducted by Kurz.

A few days after the Dresden premiere of Die Meistersinger, she left the GDR (East Germany). From 1986 to her retirement in 2007, Walther was a member of the Deutsche Oper Berlin, where Götz Friedrich was intendant. She appeared there in more than 600 performances, first as the Composer. She appeared as Amneris in Verdi's Aida in 65 performances at the house. The ensemble toured Japan in 1987 with Wagner's Ring cycle, with Walther as Fricka and Waltraute. She took part, as Olga, in the world premiere of Reimann's Das Schloß in September 1992. Her 1993 portrayal of Magdalene in Die Meistersinger was recorded on DVD in 1995; it was staged by Friedrich and conducted by Rafael Frühbeck de Burgos, with Wolfgang Brendel as Sachs and Eike Wilm Schulte as Beckmesser. In 2000 she portrayed Brangäne in Wagner's Tristan und Isolde alongside René Kollo and Gabriele Schnaut in the title roles. Later she turned towards character roles such as the Witch in Humperdinck's Hänsel und Gretel, the Kabanicha in Janáček's Káťa Kabanová and Herodias in Salome by R. Strauss. She appeared as Duchess in Henze's Der Prinz von Homburg in 2001 and as Madelon in a new production of Giordano's Andrea Chénier in 2005. Her last performance at the house was in December 2007, again as the Witch.

She performed as a guest at the Grand Theatre, Warsaw, as Fricka and as Waltraute in 1989, and as Brangäne at the Cologne Opera in 1990. In 1997 she appeared as Ježibaba in Dvořák's Rusalka at the Komische Oper Berlin, staged by Mielitz.

Walther also performed as a concert singer, known as an interpreter of Johann Sebastian Bach's music. After her retirement, she returned to the stage in 2016 to play at the Renaissance Theater in Berlin in Ronald Harwood's Quartetto, a play about four aging opera singers, alongside Karan Armstrong, Kollo and Victor von Halem.

Walther recorded a live performance from the Semperoper of Der Rosenkavalier in 1985, Das Schloß, and Beethoven's Ninth Symphony, with Herbert Kegel conducting the Dresden Philharmonic in 1987. She recorded Magdalene in Die Meistersinger on DVD in 1995. In the complete recording of the Ring cycle by Bernard Haitink with the Bavarian Radio Symphony Orchestra, she took the role of Waltraute in Die Walküre, released in 1988.

Walther died on 6 June 2026 after a long illness, at the age of 83.

== Roles ==
Walther's roles included:

- Bizet: title role in Carmen
- Dvořák: Ježibaba in Rusalka
- Giordano: Madelon in Andrea Chénier
- Gounod: Marthe in Faust
- Humperdinck: Hänsel and Witch in Hänsel und Gretel
- Janáček:
  - Kabanicha in Káťa Kabanová
  - Forester's wife and Owl in The Cunning Little Vixen
- Mozart:
  - Cherubino in Le nozze di Figaro
  - Dorabella in Così fan tutte
  - Second Lady in Die Zauberflöte
- Mussorgski: Inn keeper and Nurse in Boris Godunov
- Nicolai: Frau Reich in Die lustigen Weiber von Windsor
- Offenbach: Voice of the Mother in Les contes d'Hoffmann
- Poulenc: Mère Jeanne and Sœur Mathilde in Dialogues des Carmélites
- Puccini:
  - Frugola in Il tabarro
  - La Badessa in Suor Angelica
  - Zita in Gianni Schicchi
- J. Strauss: Prinz Orlofsky in Die Fledermaus
- R. Strauss:
  - Herodias in Salome
  - Octavian in Der Rosenkavalier
  - Composer in Ariadne auf Naxos
  - Adelaide in Arabella
- Tchaikovsky:
  - Larina in Eugene Onegin
  - Johanna in The Maid of Orleans
- Verdi:
  - Maddalena in Rigoletto
  - Eboli in Don Carlos
  - Amneris in Aida
  - Meg Page in Falstaff
- Wagner:
  - Mary in Der fliegende Holländer
  - Ortrud in Lohengrin
  - Brangäne in Tristan und Isolde
  - Magdalene in Die Meistersinger von Nürnberg
  - Fricka and Waltraute in Der Ring des Nibelungen
