= Wolfgang Schöne =

German opera singer (born 1940)

- Born: 9 February 1940 (age 86); Bad Gandersheim
- Education: Musikhochschule Hannover; Musikhochschule Hamburg
- Occupation: Classical bass-baritone
- Organization: Staatstheater Stuttgart
- Title: Kammersänger

Wolfgang Schöne (born 9 February 1940) is a German bass-baritone who made an international career in opera and concert, based at the Staatsoper Stuttgart from 1973 to 2005. He created roles in world premiered of operas, in Josef Tal's Die Versuchung at the Bavarian State Opera in 1976, in Hermann Reutter's Hamlet in Stuttgart in 1980, in Henze's Die englische Katze at the Schwetzingen Festival in 1983 and K. in Aribert Reimann's Das Schloß at the Deutsche Oper Berlin in 1992.

== Career ==
Schöne was born in Bad Gandersheim. He first worked as a primary school teacher, and then began his studies of voice at the Hochschule für Musik und Theater Hannover with Naan Põld in 1964. He moved with him to the Hochschule für Musik und Theater Hamburg in 1986, achieving his diplomas as a concert singer and music teacher in 1969. He first performed recitals and concerts, touring internationally.

Schöne made his debut as an opera singer in 1970 the role of Ottokar in Weber's Der Freischütz at the Eutin Festival. He was engaged at the Stadttheater Lübeck and at the Wuppertal Opera.

After performing the role of Guglielmo in Mozart's Così fan tutte as a guest, he was engaged at the Staatstheater Stuttgart in 1973, remaining a member until 2005. He was awarded the title Kammersänger in 1978 and became an honorary member of the Staatsoper Stuttgart in 2007.

Schöne appeared regularly at the Vienna State Opera from 1974 to 1993. In 1976, he performed the role of Chorèbe in Les Troyens by Berlioz, conducted by Gerd Albrecht. Schöne appeared regularly at the Salzburg Festival where his roles included Almaviva in Mozart's Le nozze di Figaro (1985–1987, 1990) and Alidoro in Rossini's La Cenerentola (1988–1989). He sang there in a 1988 concert performance of Gottfried von Einem's Der Prozeß and in 2002 the role of Gyges in Zemlinsky's Der König Kandaules, conducted by Kent Nagano. In 2005 he appeared as Ludovico Nardi in Schreker's Die Gezeichneten, conducted by Nagano, in aproduction that was recorded as DVD.

Schöne was a guest at the Semperoper in Dresden in 1999 as Barak in Die Frau ohne Schatten by Richard Strauss and in 2000 in the title role of Wagner's Der fliegende Holländer. In 2002 he performed for the first time the role of Hans Sachs in Wagner's Die Meistersinger von Nürnberg, at the Hamburg State Opera. In 2003 he portrayed Moses in Schoenberg's Moses und Aron in Stuttgart.

In 2008, he first performed as Scarpia in Puccini's Tosca in Stuttgart. In 2009, he appeared at the Semperoper as Der alte Mann (The old man) in Henze's L'Upupa und der Triumph der Sohnesliebe.

Schöne took part in world premiered, of Josef Tal's Die Versuchung in 1976 at the Bavarian State Opera, and in Hermann Reutter's Hamlet in 1980 in Stuttgart; he created the role of Tom, Minette's lover in Henze's Die englische Katze, with Inga Nielsen as Minette, at the Schwetzingen Festival in 1983, and the leading role of K. in Aribert Reimann's Das Schloß in 1992 at the Deutsche Oper Berlin.

Schöne performed at international opera houses, as Dr. Schön in Berg's Lulu in 1996 at the Glyndebourne Festival and in 1998 at the Opéra Bastille, as Barak in Die Frau ohne Schatten in 2000 at the Liceu in Barcelona, and as Amfortas in Wagner's Parsifal in 2003 and 2004 at La Fenice in Venice. He also sang this role in Hans-Jürgen Syberberg's film, although he did not appear on screen.

In concert he performed especially the cantatas, masses and oratorios of Bach, such as his Christmas Oratorio, St Matthew Passion and St John Passion, recording especially with Helmuth Rilling.
