= Reinhard Linden =

German opera director (born 1957)

Reinhard Linden (born 1957 in Ingelheim am Rhein) is a German opera director. Since the season 2006/2007 he has worked in this capacity at the Kiel Opera House.

A trained church musician, he previously served as a coach, tutor, conductor and singer. Linden has experience at La Scala, Paris Opera, as a coach in New York City and Vienna, and in teaching in the universities of Mainz and Frankfurt. He was at the Wuppertal Opera and the Deutsche Oper am Rhein study leader from 2004 to 2006. He was also an artistic advisor at National Chiang Kai-Shek Cultural Center in Taipei, Taiwan, where he overlooked the first performance of Richard Wagner's Der Ring des Nibelungen in the Chinese-speaking world.
