= Leonard Stein (musicologist) =

American conductor and musicologist

- Born: December 1, 1916; Los Angeles, United States
- Died: June 23, 2004 (aged 87)
- Genres: 20th-century classical music
- Occupations: Musicologist, pianist, conductor, and educator
- Instrument: Piano
- Years active: 1946–2004

Leonard David Stein (December 1, 1916 – June 23, 2004) was an American musicologist, pianist, conductor and university teacher. He was influential in promoting contemporary music on the American West Coast. He was for years Arnold Schoenberg's assistant, music director of the Schoenberg Institute at USC, and among the foremost authorities on Schoenberg's music. He was also an influential teacher in the lives of many younger composers, such as the influential minimalist La Monte Young.

== Life ==
Stein studied piano under the Busoni disciple Richard Buhlig at Los Angeles City College, and composition and theory under Schoenberg at University of Southern California (1935–36) and University of California, Los Angeles (UCLA) (BA: 1939, MM: 1941, MA: 1942). Stein was an assistant to Schoenberg at UCLA from 1939 until Schoenberg's retirement in 1942. Thereafter until Schoenberg's death nine years later Stein was his personal assistant, working closely with Schoenberg on the editing of his scores, and later, completing four of Schoenberg's posthumously published theoretical writings pertaining to counterpoint, harmony, and composition, including an extended compilation to the second edition (1975) of Schoenberg's thought (Style and Idea). Lawrence Schoenberg, the youngest of Schoenberg's children, considered Stein the most important advocate of Schoenberg's music.

Stein later returned to the University of Southern California for post-graduate studies, receiving a DMA in 1965 with a dissertation titled The Performance of Twelve-Tone and Serial Music for the Piano, which included analyses of important piano works by Schoenberg, Anton Webern, Karlheinz Stockhausen, Pierre Boulez, and others. Beginning in 1946 he taught at Occidental College, Los Angeles City College, Pomona College, UCLA, University of California, San Diego, California State University, Dominguez Hills, and primarily at the California Institute of the Arts, and what is now Claremont Graduate University.

Highly regarded among peers and composers, such as Igor Stravinsky, Robert Craft, and Pierre Boulez, Stein's pedagogy, which stems directly from the teachings of Schoenberg, was a historical turning point in the cross fertilization of European art music in the development of mid-to late 20th-century music in America. For his students, See: List of music students by teacher: R to S#Leonard Stein..

Stein created and directed the Encounters concert series in 1960 with Olivier Messiaen, Pierre Boulez, Karlheinz Stockhausen, and John Cage in attendance. Described as "legendary" in a 2009 Los Angeles Times article by Josef Woodard, John Harbison composed a work of thirteen pieces for piano as a tribute to Stein, based on word permutations of Stein's name, entitled Leonard Stein Anagrams, which was premiered by Gloria Cheng at Zipper Hall, Colburn School of Music, on October 13, 2009.

While working as an adjunct professor, Stein was the music director of the Schoenberg Institute at USC from 1975 to 1991, where he played a seminal role in promoting Schoenberg's music and his legacy to the American public by also organizing seminars and performing in concerts devoted to Schoenberg and new music. Stein was also editor of the Journal of the Schoenberg Institute from 1977 to 1991. At his retirement in 1991 Stein was awarded the Phi Kappa Phi Diploma of Honor for Lifetime Achievement. The UC San Diego houses the Leonard Stein Papers, consisting of a collection of his voluminous correspondence with major composers from the late twentieth century, including Ernst Krenek, Elliott Carter, Olivier Messiaen, Karlheinz Stockhausen, Milton Babbitt, György Ligeti, Pierre Boulez, Iannis Xenakis, Luciano Berio, et al. He also toured as a conductor and pianist.

Stein died of natural causes at Providence St. Joseph Medical Center in Burbank on June 24, 2004.

== Publications ==
=== Author ===
- 1963. "The Performer's Point of View". Perspectives of New Music 1, no. 2 (Spring): 62–71.
- 1963. "New Music on Mondays". Perspectives of New Music 2, no. 1 (Autumn–Winter): 142–150.
- 1965. Stein, Leonard David. The Performance of Twelve-Tone and Serial Music for the Piano. DMA diss. Los Angeles: University of Southern California.
- 1978. "From Inception to Realization in the Sketches of Schoenberg". In Internationale Schönberg-Gesellschaft: Bericht über den 1. Kongreß der Internationalen Schönberg-Gesellschaft: Wien, 4.–9. Juni 1974, edited by Rudolf Stephan, 213–27. Publikationen der Internationalen Schönberg-Gesellschaft 1. Vienna: Lafite.
- 1986. "Schoenberg and 'kleine Modernsky'". In Confronting Stravinsky: Man, Musician, and Modernist, edited by Jann Pasler, 310–324. Berkeley and Los Angeles: University of California Press. ISBN 9780520054035 (cloth); ISBN 9780520064669 (pbk).
- 1987. "Busoni e Schonberg: op. 11 n. 2 come emblema di un rapporto". In La trascrizione Bach e Busoni: atti del Convegno internazionale (Empoli-Firenze, 23–26 ottobre 1985), edited by Talia Pecker Berio, 105–128. Quaderni della Rivista italiana di musicologia 18. Florence: L.S. Olschki. ISBN 9788822235350

=== Editor ===
- 1963. Arnold Schoenberg. Preliminary Exercises in Counterpoint. London: Faber and Faber. Reprinted New York: St. Martin's Press, 1964.
- 1967. Arnold Schoenberg. Fundamentals of Musical Composition, edited by Gerald Strang, with the collaboration of and an introduction by Leonard Stein. New York: St. Martin's Press. Reprinted London: Faber and Faber, 1970. 9780571092765
- 1969. Arnold Schoenberg: Structural Functions of Harmony, second edition, with corrections. New York: W. W. Norton; London: Benn. ISBN 9780393020892 (Norton, cloth); ISBN 9780393004786 (Norton, pbk); ISBN 9780510359102 (Benn, cloth); ISBN 9780571130009 (Benn, pbk).
- 1972. Arnold Schoenberg. Models for Beginners in Composition: Syllabus, Music Examples, and Glossary, revised edition, Los Angeles: Belmont Music Publishers.
- 1975. Arnold Schoenberg. Style and Idea, revised edition. New York: St. Martin's Press.
- 1975. "Schoenberg: Five Statements", edited by Leonard Stein. Perspectives of New Music 14, no. 1 (Fall–Winter): 161–173.
- 1988. From Pierrot to Marteau: An International Conference and Concert Celebrating the Tenth Anniversary of the Arnold Schoenberg Institute, University of Southern California School of Music, March 14–16, 1987. Los Angeles: Arnold Schoenberg Institute.

== Discography ==
- Donald Erb. Music for Instruments and Electronic Sounds: Reconnaissance; In No Strange Land. Reconnaissance performed by Bonnie Douglas, violin; Rand Forbes, double-bass; Ralph Grierson, piano; Kenneth Watson, percussion; Michael Tilson Thomas, Moog synthesizer; Leonard Stein, Moog polyphonic instrument; Donald Erb, conductor. LP recording. 1 sound disc: analog, 33⅓ rpm, stereo.; 12 in. Nonesuch H-71223. New York: Nonesuch Records, 1969.
- Arnold Schoenberg. Brettl-Lieder. Marni Nixon, soprano; Leonard Stein, piano. LP recording, 1 disc.; 33⅓ rpm. stereo.; 12 in. RCA Red Seal ARL1-1231. [New York]: RCA Red Seal, 1975.
- Hindemith-Gross: Violin Sonatas. Robert Gross, violin; Mike Reese, piano; Leonard Stein, piano. Recorded: New York, New York City Center, 1944 and 1945. LP recording: 1 disc, 33⅓ rpm. mono. TownHall S32. Santa Barbara: TownHall Records, 1982.
- Joan La Barbara: Singing Through: Vocal Compositions by John Cage. With William Winant, percussion; Leonard Stein, pianist. CD recording. 1 sound disc: digital; 4¾ in. New Albion Records NA 035. San Francisco: New Albion Records, 1990.
- John Cage at Summerstage. Joan La Barbara, soprano; William Winant, percussion; Leonard Stein, piano, whistles, voice, and percussion. Recorded at John Cage's last concert given in New York's Central Park, 23 July 1992. CD recording. 1 sound disc: digital; 4¾ in. Music & Arts CD-875. Berkeley, California: Music & Arts, 1995.
