= Aribert Reimann =

German composer, pianist and accompanist (1936–2024)

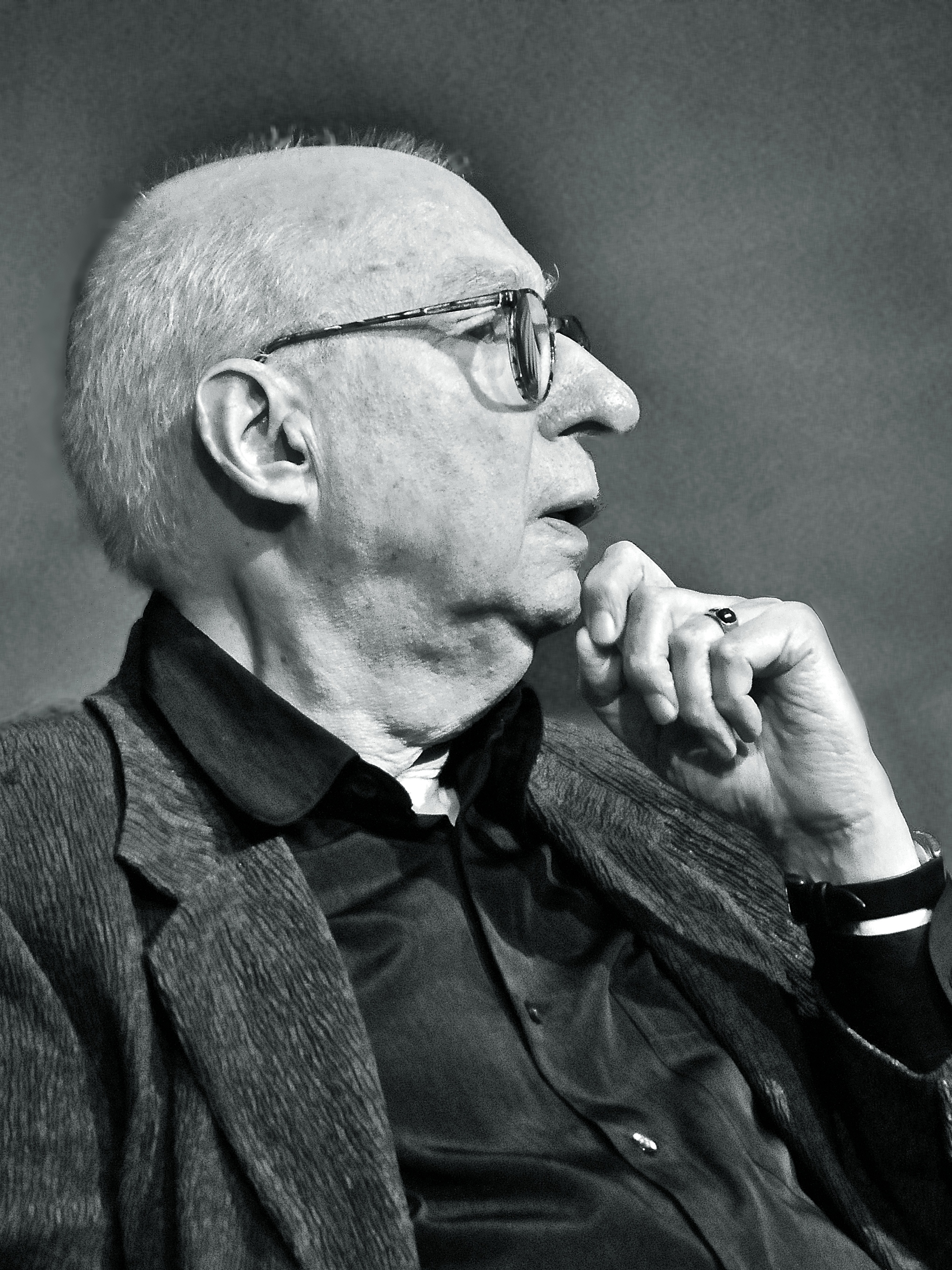
- Reimann in 2010
- Born: 4 March 1936; Berlin, German Reich
- Died: 13 March 2024 (aged 88)
- Education: Musikhochschule Berlin
- Occupations: Concert pianist; Composer; Academic teacher
- Organizations: Musikhochschule Hamburg; Hochschule der Künste Berlin
- Awards: German Order of Merit; Berliner Kunstpreis; Arnold Schönberg Prize; Ernst von Siemens Music Prize

Aribert Reimann (German: ['aʁiːbɛʁt 'ʁaɪman], 4 March 1936 – 13 March 2024) was a German composer, pianist, and accompanist, known especially for his literary operas. His version of Shakespeare's King Lear, the opera Lear, was written at the suggestion of Dietrich Fischer-Dieskau, who performed the title role. His opera Medea after Grillparzer's play premiered in 2010 at the Vienna State Opera. He was a professor of contemporary Lied (art song) in Hamburg and Berlin. In 2011, he was awarded the Ernst von Siemens Music Prize for his life's work.

== Life and career ==
Reimann was born in Berlin on 4 March 1936. His father, Wolfgang Reimann, served as choirmaster at Berlin Cathedral; his mother was an oratorio singer and voice teacher. As a boy of age 10, he performed in a production of the school opera (Schuloper) Der Jasager. He studied at the Musikhochschule Berlin, composition and counterpoint with Boris Blacher and Ernst Pepping, and piano with Otto Rausch. During his studies, he worked as a répétiteur at the Städtische Oper. His first appearances as a pianist and accompanist were in 1957. He moved to Vienna to study musicology in 1958.

Working with singers such as Catherine Gayer, Brigitte Fassbaender, and Dietrich Fischer-Dieskau increased his sensibility to the potential of voices. His first work for the stage was a ballet, Stoffreste, to a libretto by Günter Grass and first performed in 1959. His first opera, in 1965, was Ein Traumspiel, to a libretto that Carla Henius based on Strindberg's A Dream Play in the translation by Peter Weiss; it premiered on 20 June 1965 at the Opernhaus Kiel. His fourth opera, Lear, based on Shakespeare's play, was inspired by Fischer-Dieskau, who portrayed Lear in the first performance at the Bavarian State Opera, in 1978. The opera became a lasting success, with 30 productions as of 2024. His commissioned work, Cantus for Clarinet and Orchestra, dedicated to the clarinetist and composer Jörg Widmann, premiered on 13 January 2006, in the WDR's Large Broadcasting Hall in Cologne, Germany, in the presence of the composer, who claimed that the work was inspired by Claude Debussy's compositions for clarinet. His opera Medea, after Franz Grillparzer, premiered at the Vienna State Opera in 2010, conducted by Michael Boder, with Marlis Petersen in the title role. It was chosen as world premiere of the year by critics.

In the early 1970s, Reimann became a member of the Akademie der Künste in Berlin. He was professor of contemporary Lied at the Musikhochschule Hamburg from 1974 to 1983, then at Berlin's Hochschule der Künste from 1983 to 1998. Reimann was co-editor and pianist of the record label Orfeo's album series Edition zeitgenössisches Lied (contemporary song).

He was honoured repeatedly, including the Grand Cross of Merit of the Federal Republic of Germany and the Order of Merit of Berlin. Invited by Walter Fink, he was the seventh composer featured in the annual Komponistenporträt of the Rheingau Musik Festival in 1997, in songs and chamber music with the Auryn Quartet, playing the piano himself. In 2011 Reimann was awarded the Ernst von Siemens Music Prize "for his life's work".

Reimann was gay and lived in Berlin. Reimann died on 13 March 2024, at the age of 88.

== Awards ==
Reimann received many awards:

- 1962 Berliner Kunstpreis für Musik (Junge Generation) – Berlin Art Prize for Music (Young Generation)
- 1963 Villa Massimo scholarship
- 1965 Robert-Schumann-Preis der Stadt Düsseldorf
- 1966 Förderungspreis der Stadt Stuttgart
- 1985 Braunschweiger Ludwig-Spohr-Preis – Ludwig Spohr Prize of Braunschweig
- 1986 Prix de composition musicale de la Fondation Prince Pierre de Monaco – Prize for musical composition, from the Prince Pierre of Monaco Foundation
- 1987 Bach Prize of the Free and Hanseatic City of Hamburg
- 1991 Frankfurter Musikpreis
- 1993 Officier de "L'Ordre du Mérite Culturel" de la Principauté de Monaco
- 1993 Pour le Mérite for Arts and Sciences, Germany
- 1995 Knight Commander's Cross of the Order of Merit of the Federal Republic of Germany
- 1999 Commandeur de "L'Ordre du Mérite Culturel" de la Principauté de Monaco (Commander of the Order of Cultural Merit of the Principality of Monaco)
- 1999 Goldene Nadel der Dramatiker Union
- 2002 Preis der Kulturstiftung Dortmund
- 2002 Berliner Kunstpreis
- 2006 Arnold Schönberg Prize
- 2011 Ernst von Siemens Music Prize
- 2016 Robert Schumann Prize for Poetry and Music Mainz
- 2018 Deutscher Theaterpreis Der Faust (lifetime achievement award)

== Works ==
Reimann's reputation as a composer rests on his literary operas, including Lear and Das Schloß, and song cycles. He also wrote chamber music, orchestral works and songs. His works were published by Schott.

=== Stage ===
- Ein Traumspiel, opera after Strindberg's A Dream Play
- Die Vogelscheuchen, ballet to a libretto by Günter Grass, premiered on 7 October 1970 at the Deutsche Oper Berlin
- Melusine, opera after Yvan Goll's play (1971)
- Lear, opera after Shakespeare's King Lear (1978)
- Die Gespenstersonate, opera after August Strindberg's play The Ghost Sonata (1984)
- Troades, opera after Euripides' The Trojan Women(1986)
- Das Schloß, opera after Kafka's Das Schloss (1992)
- Bernarda Albas Haus, opera after Lorca's The House of Bernarda Alba
- Medea, opera (after part 3 of Grillparzer's The Golden Fleece) (2010)
- L'Invisible, opera after Maurice Maeterlinck's L'Intruse, L'Intérieur and La Mort de Tintagiles (2017)

=== Orchestral ===
- Variations for Orchestra
- Nahe Ferne (Near Distance)
- Cantus für Klarinette und Orchester (Cantus for Clarinet and Orchestra)
- Sieben Fragmente für Orchester in memoriam Robert Schumann (Seven Fragments for Orchestra, in memoriam Robert Schumann) (1988)
- Violin Concerto (1996)

=== Vocal music ===
- Zyklus nach Gedichten von Paul Celan für Bariton und Klavier (Song cycle based on the poetry of Paul Celan for baritone and piano) (1956)
- Wolkenloses Christfest. Requiem nach Gedichten von Otfried Büthe., dedicated to Dietrich Fischer-Dieskau and Siegfried Palm (1974)
- Nachtstück II für Baryton und Klavier (1978)
- Unrevealed, Lord Byron to Augusta Leigh für Bariton und Streichquartett (1981)
- Requiem for soprano, mezzo-soprano, baritone, mixed choir and orchestry, using the Latin Requiem and verses from the Book of Job (1982)
- Shine and Dark for baritone and piano left hand (1989)
- Entsorgt for baritone solo (1989)
- Eingedunkelt for alto solo (1992)
- Fünf Lieder nach Gedichten von Paul Celan für Countertenor und Klavier (Five songs based on poetry by Celan for countertenor and piano) (1994/2001)
- An Hermann for tenor and piano (2008)
