= Die Vogelscheuchen =

Die Vogelscheuchen (The Scarecrows) is a narrative ballet in three acts. The libretto was written by Günter Grass, based on motifs from his novel Dog Years (Hundejahre). Aribert Reimann composed the music. The choreographer of the premiere was Marcel Luipart, a friend of Grass. The ballet was first performed on 7 October 1970 at the Deutsche Oper Berlin. The principal roles were danced by Frank Frey, Eva Evdokimova, Klaus Beelitz, Silvia Kesselheim, and Monika Radamm.

== Characters ==
- The Gardener
- His Daughter
- The Scarecrows:
  - The Prefect
  - The Abbess
  - The Grenadier
  - Hallelujah Scarecrows
- Seabirds
- Other Birds
- Groups of Scarecrows:
  - Headless Knights
  - Nuns with Epilepsy
  - Grenadiers
  - Uniformed Men

== Plot ==
=== Act One ===
Scene: In the Garden

Since birds invaded the garden, the gardener is terrified they might destroy his beautiful work. His daughter shows no understanding for her father's anger. When the gardener chases the birds away, the girl brings them back. As a last resort, he builds a scarecrow. After placing it in the garden, it comes to life and pretends to be the prefect. The birds fear him and stay away from the garden, which makes the gardener happy. But when the scarecrow falls in love with his daughter, he becomes worried. Finally, the prefect persuades the girl to accompany him to the world of the scarecrows.

=== Act Two ===
Scene: World of the Scarecrows

The abbess, the grenadier, and the Hallelujah Scarecrows give the girl and her lover a warm welcome. Then, the individual groups are introduced to her: the headless knights, the epileptic nuns, the grenadiers, and the uniformed men. All the scarecrows want the young lady to soon learn their secret language so that she can become one of their own. The wedding of the prefect and his sweetheart is immediately set in motion. As the procession turns into a leaping dance, the girl, who has grown frightened by the entire spectacle, manages to escape.

=== Act Three ===
Scene: In the garden

The father refuses his daughter entry into the house. The girl collapses in despair. Only when the scarecrows approach to bring the runaway back to their realm does the father reconsider. In his attempt to rescue his daughter, he is attacked by the birds. With difficulty, he manages to drive them off; but in the end, he discovers that he himself has become a scarecrow.
