= Theater Kiel =

Theater company in Kiel

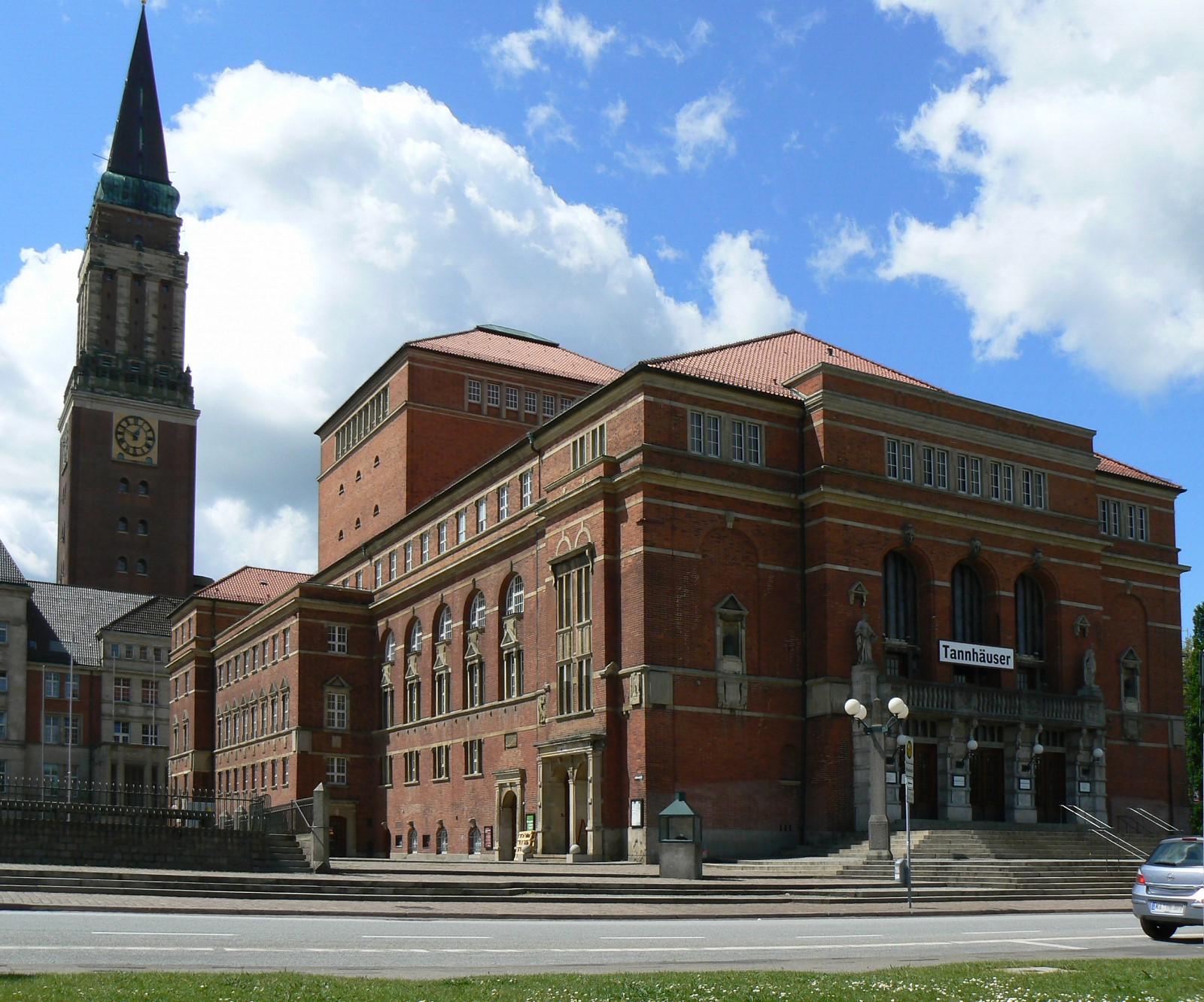
Opernhaus Kiel, the opera house of Kiel, built in 1907, pictured in 2007

Theater Kiel is a theatre company in Kiel, the capital of Schleswig-Holstein, Germany. It is jointly funded by the city and the state. The company produces opera, musical, ballet, plays, and theatre for youth and children, in three different buildings: the Opernhaus (completed in 1907), the Schauspielhaus, and the Theater im Werftpark.

== History ==
The theatre dates its history to 1907, when the opera house was completed. Former names include Bühnen der Landeshauptstadt Kiel (Stages of the state capital Kiel) and Landestheater Kiel (State Theatre Kiel).

Associated people as of 2014 are general director Daniel Karasek, director of music Georg Fritzsch, commercial director Jörn Sturm, director of opera Reinhard Linden, director of children's and youth theater Norbert Aust, directors of ballet Yaroslav Ivanenko and Heather Jurgensen.

The theatre is supported by the Gesellschaft der Freunde des Theaters in Kiel (Association of the friends of the theatre in Kiel), the Musikfreunde Kiel (Friends of Music Kiel), and the Volksbühne Kiel (Stage of the people Kiel), who all organize numerous events.

== Buildings ==
=== Opernhaus Kiel ===
Opernhaus Kiel
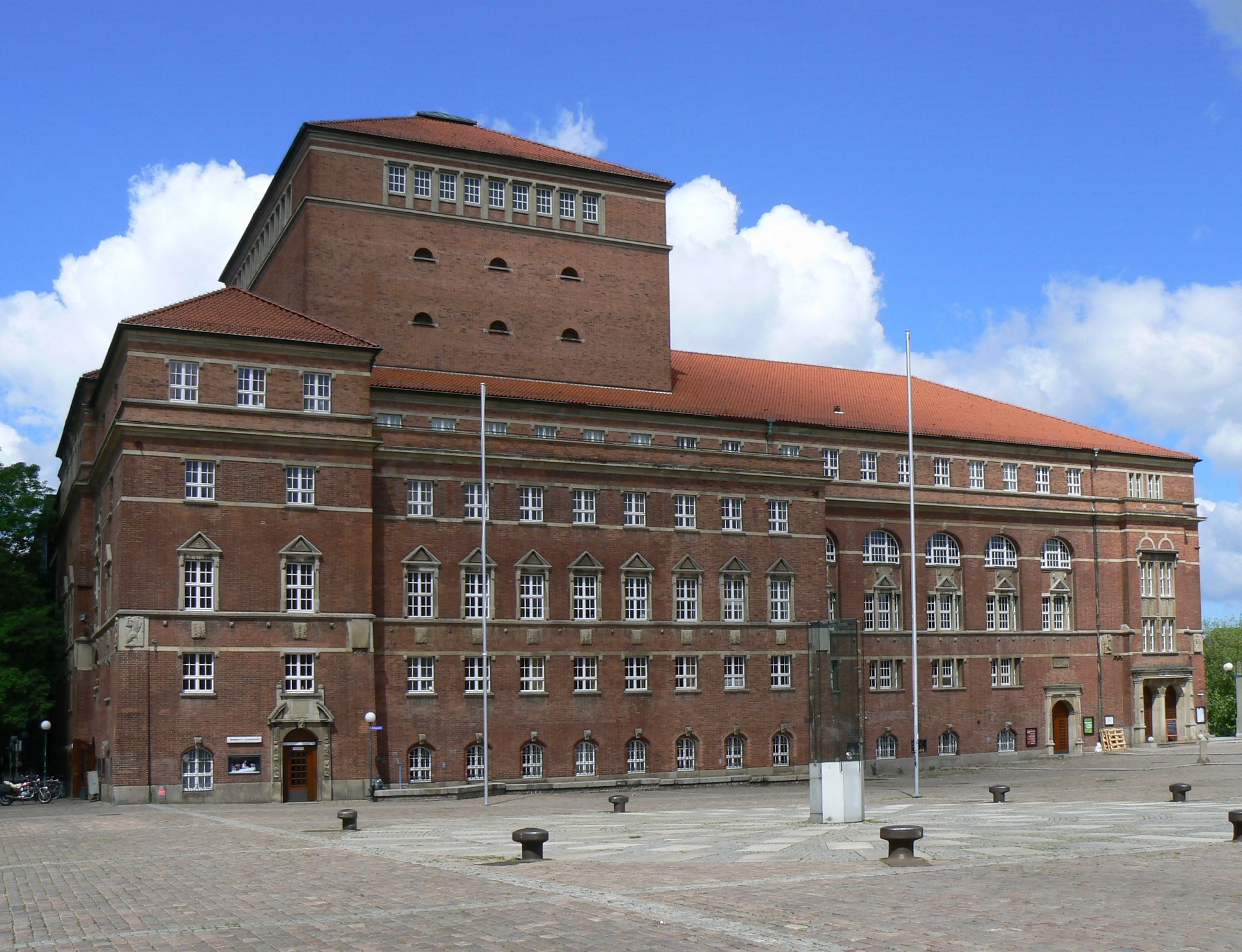
- Interactive map of the Opernhaus Kiel area

General information
- Location: Kiel, Schleswig-Holstein, Germany
- Coordinates: 54°19′23″N 10°08′00″E
- Construction started: 1905
- Completed: 1907
- Renovated: 1952–1953

Design and construction
- Architect: Heinrich Seeling

Website
- www.oper-kiel.de

The Kiel Opera House (Opernhaus Kiel) is the city's major venue for opera, ballet, and orchestral performances. It was designed by architect Heinrich Seeling and built from 1905 to 1907. Aerial bombings destroyed much of the original structure in 1942 and 1943, and architects Henry Hansen and Guido Widmann were later brought in to restore the theatre from 1952 to 1953.

== Performances ==
The first performance of Theater Kiel was Beethoven's Fidelio on 1 October 1907.

In 1988, the theatre was part of the co-commission of the opera The Making of the Representative for Planet 8 by Philip Glass, together with the English National Opera, Houston Grand Opera, and Het Muziektheater, Amsterdam.

In the season 2007/2008, Theater Kiel celebrated its 100th anniversary. In addition to the program during the season, a summer event was held. The second opera by Cristóbal Halffter, Lázaro, was premiered on 4 May 2008 at the Kiel Opera House as part of the celebration.

In 2010, the first large scale stage work Márton Illés, Die weiße Fürstin, was co-produced with the Munich Biennale. It premiered at the Gasteig, and was repeated in Kiel in May and June.

An open-air performance of Puccini's Tosca was presented at the Kiel Town Hall Square in 2012.
