= Michael Boder =

German conductor of opera and concert (1958–2024)

- Boder c. 2000
- Born: 9 November 1958; Darmstadt, Hesse, West Germany
- Died: 7 April 2024 (aged 65); Vienna, Austria
- Education: Musikhochschule Hamburg
- Occupation: Operatic conductor
- Organizations: Basel Opera; Liceu; Royal Danish Theatre

Michael Boder (9 November 1958 – 7 April 2024) was a German conductor of opera and concert who worked internationally. He was music director of the Basel Opera from 1989 to 1993, of the Liceu in Barcelona from 2008 to 2012, and principal conductor of the Royal Danish Theatre to 2016. He conducted regularly at the Vienna State Opera, including the world premieres of Cerha's Der Riese vom Steinfeld and Reimann's Medea. He also conducted the premieres of operas by Pascal Dusapin, Hans Werner Henze, Luca Lombardi, Krzysztof Penderecki, and Manfred Trojahn, among others.

== Career ==
Boder was born in Darmstadt on 9 November 1958. His father was an opera singer, who appeared in the title role of Alban Berg's Wozzeck often, and the boy was on stage in the role of his son. Boder studied first at the Musikhochschule Hamburg, then in Florence where he worked with Riccardo Muti and Zubin Mehta. He was an assistant to Michael Gielen at the Oper Frankfurt. In 1988, during this time, he conducted at the Opernhaus Zürich Aribert Reimann's Lear, directed by Harry Kupfer.

Shortly afterwards, with the 1988/89 season, Boder became music director of the Basel Opera, serving until 1993. In 1991, he conducted there the world premiere of Luca Lombardi's Faust. Un travestimento. He became a regular guest conductor at the state operas of Dresden, Hamburg and Munich. He also conducted at the San Francisco Opera and the Deutsche Oper Berlin. He was focused on contemporary music, in opera and also in concert. He contacted composers such as Reimann, Hans Werner Henze and Péter Eötvös, and discussed with them details of the music to be played, often played for the first time.

Boder made his debut at the Vienna State Opera on 15 December 1995, conducting Alban Berg's Wozzeck. He conducted there also Die Frau ohne Schatten and Ariadne auf Naxos by Richard Strauss, Berg's Lulu, Wagner's Die Meistersinger von Nürnberg and Hindemith's Cardillac. The first scenic production of Schönberg's Die Jakobsleiter was coupled with Puccini's Gianni Schicchi. He conducted there the world premieres of Friedrich Cerha's Der Riese vom Steinfeld in 2002 and Aribert Reimann's Medea in 2010. The Medea production, with Marlis Petersen in the title role, was filmed for DVD. Boder's style was focused on transparency for musical structures, but he also realised sensous sonorities even in complex music. His version of Elektra was described as a "nervously twitching soul document of a threatening family constellation" with brief idyllic moments of light.

He conducted regularly at the Theater an der Wien, including the world premieres of Anno Schreier's Hamlet and Christian Jost's Egmont. He conducted their new productions of Schubert's Lazarus, Stravinsky's The Rake's Progress, and von Einem's Der Besuch der alten Dame.

Boder made his debut at the Royal Opera House conducting Verdi's Rigoletto in 1988; he conducted there the world premiere of Morgen und Abend by Georg Friedrich Haas, in a coproduction with the Staatsoper Berlin, in 2015. Other operatic premieres were in 1991 Penderecki's Ubu Rex for the opening of the Munich Opera Festival, in 1992 Reimann's Das Schloß, in 1998 Manfred Trojahn's Was ihr wollt at the Bavarian State Opera, and in 2007 Henze's Phaedra at the Staatsoper Berlin. In 1996, he conducted the German premiere of Enescu's Œdipe in a production shown at several houses. He conducted the premiere of Pascal Dusapin's Faustus, the Last Night at the Staatsoper Berlin in a coproduction with Opéra National de Lyon in 2006, and a reviewer noted that he "securely organised the sound architecture". He returned to Zürich in 2013 to conduct Tri sestry by Péter Eötvös, a work requiring orchestras at different locations in the theatre.

Boder was the general music director (GMD) of the Liceu in Barcelona from 2008 to 2012. He was subsequently chief conductor of the Royal Danish Theatre to 2016.

He was engaged in a project to commemorate Arnold Schoenberg in his 150th year of birth, with a concert at the Theater an der Wien planned on 26 April 2024, played by Klangforum Wien.

Boder died suddenly in Vienna on 7 April 2024, at the age of 65. Stefan Herheim, director of the Vienna State Opera, said in memory of their first interaction for Berg's Lulu: "I got to know Michael as an artist whose satisfaction depended on whether he managed to get the best out of his counterpart fetch".

Cultural offices
Preceded by Sebastian Weigle	Music Director, Gran Teatre del Liceu; 2008–2012	Succeeded by Josep Pons
Preceded by Michael Schønwandt	Principal Conductor, Royal Danish Orchestra; 2012–2016	Succeeded by Alexander Vedernikov
