= Style and Idea =

Book by Arnold Schönberg

First edition (publ. Philosophical Library, 1950)

Style and Idea: Selected Writings of Arnold Schoenberg (in German: Stil und Gedanke) is collection of essays, articles and sketches by Arnold Schoenberg, that has appeared in various forms.

The earliest may date to c. 1950 (just before his death), edited and translated by Dika Newlin, and contains fifteen essays, published by Philosophical Library, New York:

1. The relationship to the text (1912)
2. Gustav Mahler (1912, 1948)
3. New music, outmoded music, style and idea (1946)
4. Brahms the progressive (1933 radio talk, revised 1947 as an essay)
5. Composition with twelve tones (1941 and c. 1948)
6. A dangerous game (1944?)
7. Eartraining through composing (1939)
8. Heart and brain in music (1946)
9. Criteria for the evaluation of music (1946)
10. Folkloristic symphonies (1947)
11. Human rights (1947)
12. On revient toujours (1948)
13. The blessing of the dressing (1948)
14. This is my fault (1949)
15. To the wharfs.

(Dates from the table of contents, sources and notes to the 1975 edition.) A Spanish translation was published by Taurus of Madrid in 1951.

The 1975 edition first published (according to an inner page) by Faber and Faber, published in the United States by Belmont Music Publishers and by St. Martin's Press the same year 1975, was twice as long (559 pp. as against 224 for the first version), contained 94 selections of varying lengths in 10 themed sections (including most of the above, dividing "Composition with twelve tones" into two parts) in translations by Leo Black, edited by Leonard Stein (though Dika Newlin is still credited for the translations of the twelve items above) - "A Dangerous Game" and "To the Wharfs" were dropped between versions.

The sections of the new version are:

1. Editor's preface
2. Translator's preface
3. Personal Evaluation and Retrospect (14 items, c. 1923–1949)
4. Modern Music (10 items, 1912–1949)
5. Folk-Music and Nationalism (6 items, c. 1926–1947)
6. Critics and Criticism (7 items, 1909–1923)
7. Twelve-Tone Composition (6 items, 1923–c. 1948)
8. Theory and Composition (13 items, 1922–c. 1948)
9. Performance and Notation (18 items, 1923–1948)
10. Teaching (8 items, 1911–1950)
11. Composers (15 items, 1911–1951)
12. Social and Political Matters (1912–1950)
13. Sources and Notes
14. Appendices
15. Index

The Philosophical Library reprinted the 14-item 1950 edition in 2010.
