= Carré (Stockhausen) =

Composition by the German composer Karlheinz Stockhausen

Carré (Square) for four orchestras and four choirs (1959–60) is a composition by the German composer Karlheinz Stockhausen, and is Work Number 10 in the composer's catalog of works.

== History ==
Carré was commissioned by the Norddeutscher Rundfunk (NDR) in Hamburg. The essential ideas occurred to Stockhausen in November–December 1958 while on a tour of the United States where, during hours spent each day flying from one location to another, he experienced the slowest temporal rates of change of his life. The work was composed in 1959–60, in collaboration with Stockhausen's assistant Cornelius Cardew, and was premiered on 28 October 1960 in the Festival Hall of the Planten un Blomen Park in Hamburg, as part of the NDR's concert series Das neue Werk, with the NDR Chor und NDR Sinfonieorchester, conducted by Mauricio Kagel (orchestra I), Stockhausen (orchestra II), Andrzej Markowski (orchestra III), and Michael Gielen (orchestra IV). The score is dedicated to the former director of Das neue Werk, Herbert Hübner.

== Material and form ==
Carré is a serial composition in which (together with the concurrently composed Kontakte) Stockhausen for the first time treated spatial distribution on the same level of structural importance as properties such as pitch, rhythm, timbre, dynamics, register, density, and others.

Stockhausen groups Carré with Kontakte (1958–60) and Momente (1962–64/69) as representatives of moment form, in which he tried

to compose states and processes in which each moment is a personal, centred one, that can exist on its own and, as something individual, can also always be related to its surroundings and to the whole; something in which everything that happens does not pursue a determined course from a defined beginning to an inevitable end.

A large orchestra of 80 players is divided into four orchestral units, each of approximately the same scoring and each with its own conductor. A mixed choir of between 12 and 16 singers is attached to each orchestra.

Carré unfolds 101 "moments" with durations varying from 1.5 to 90 seconds, each of which is characterised by one or several notes and chords. However, Stockhausen originally planned 252 sections in his draft form scheme, where eight basic categories of sound are arrayed, each with four levels:

1. Type: the four solo instruments used to furnish each of the four orchestras with a characteristic timbre: cimbalom, vibraphone, piano, and harp
2. Attack: four "attack transient" percussion instruments, also used to differentiate the four orchestras: Indian bells, drums, Alpine cowbells, and cymbals
3. Gestalt variation: four parameters within which transformations are to occur: rhythm, "height", timbre, and dynamics
4. Density: number of notes present, from one to four
5. Register: four principal octave registers
6. Duration: four generic values from "short" to "as long as possible"
7. Amplitude: four basic dynamic levels, notated in the sketch (but not the score) with numerals
8. Colour: four basic timbres: voices, strings, woodwinds, and brass

In contrast to the complex interrelationships of these eight sound categories, the underlying pitch structure of Carré is so simple that Stockhausen was able to write it out on a single sheet of music paper. The basic pitch series used throughout the work is

E♭ D E C♯ F C F♯ B G B♭ A♭ A.

The regular melodic succession of this all-interval row is obscured compositionally, however, through the grouping of some notes into chords—e.g., in the first section, one three-note chord, F♯ B G, and one two-note chord, B♭ A♭.

== Instrumentation ==
=== Orchestra I ===
- 1 Alto Flute (doubling flute)
- 1 Oboe
- 1 Bass Clarinet in B♭
- Tenor Saxophone in B♭
- 1 Horn (high, in F)
- 1 Trumpet in D
- Bass Trumpet in B♭
- Bass Trombone
- SATB choir (2 or 3 voices per part)
- Piano
- 2 Percussionists:
  - 2 Tomtoms and 1 Bongo
  - 3 Alpine Cowbells [Almglocken]
  - 1 Bass Drum (as large as possible)
  - 1 Snare Drum (very bright)
  - Indian Bells
  - Suspended Cymbals (large and thin)
  - 1 Hihat (as large as possible, thin cymbals)
  - 1 Gong (as large as possible)
  - 1 Tamtam (as large as possible)
- 4 Violins
- 2 Violas
- 2 Cellos

=== Orchestra II ===
- 1 Flute
- 1 Cor anglais
- 1 Clarinet in B♭
- 1 Bassoon
- 2 Horns (1 high, 1 low)
- 1 Trumpet (in C)
- 1 Tenor Trombone
- SATB choir (2 or 3 voices per part)
- Vibraphone
- 2 Percussionists:
  - 2 Tomtoms and 1 Bongo
  - 3 Alpine Cowbells [Almglocken]
  - 1 Bass Drum (as large as possible)
  - 1 Snare Drum (very bright)
  - Indian Bells
  - Suspended Cymbals (large and thin)
  - 1 Hihat (as large as possible, thin cymbals)
  - 1 Gong (as large as possible)
  - 1 Tamtam (as large as possible)
- 4 Violins
- 2 Violas
- 2 Cellos

=== Orchestra III ===
- 1 Oboe
- 1 Clarinet in B♭
- 1 Baritone Saxophone in E♭
- 1 Bassoon
- 1 Horn (low)
- 1 Trumpet (in C)
- 1 Alto Trombone
- 1 Bass Tuba
- SATB choir (2 or 3 voices per part)
- 1 Cimbalom (amplified)
- 2 Percussionists:
  - 2 Tomtoms and 1 Bongo
  - 3 Alpine Cowbells [Almglocken]
  - 1 Bass Drum (as large as possible)
  - 1 Snare Drum (very bright)
  - Indian Bells
  - Suspended Cymbals (large and thin)
  - 1 Hihat (as large as possible, thin cymbals)
  - 1 Gong (as large as possible)
  - 1 Tamtam (as large as possible)
- 4 Violins
- 2 Violas
- 2 Cellos

=== Orchestra IV ===
- 1 Flute
- 1 Clarinet in A
- 1 Alto Saxophone in E♭
- 1 Bassoon
- 2 Horns (1 high, 1 low)
- 1 Trumpet (in C)
- 1 Tenor Trombone
- SATB choir (2 or 3 voices per part)
- 1 Harp (amplified—the harp part may be supplemented by an amplified harpsichord)
- 2 Percussionists:
  - 2 Tomtoms and 1 Bongo
  - 3 Alpine Cowbells [Almglocken]
  - 1 Snare Drum (very bright)
  - Indian Bells
  - Suspended Cymbals (large and thin)
  - 1 Hihat (as large as possible, thin cymbals)
  - 1 Gong (as large as possible)
  - 1 Tamtam (as large as possible)
- 4 Violins
- 2 Violas
- 2 Cellos

== Discography ==
- 1968. WDR Symphony Orchestra, Cologne, conducted by Karlheinz Stockhausen, Andrzej Markowski, Mauricio Kagel, and Michael Gielen. Recorded May 1965; released with Stockhausen's Gruppen on Deutsche Grammophon DG 137 002 (LP), DG921022 (Cassette). [N.p.]: Polydor International.
  - reissued under the same LP disc number, in the first set of Deutsche Grammophon's Avant Garde series. [Hamburg]: Deutsche Grammophon Gesellschaft, ca. 1972.
  - reissued on reel-to-reel 7½ ips tape, as DGC 7002. Elk Grove Village, Illinois: Ampex/Deutsche Grammophon, ca. 1974.
  - reissued on Stockhausen Complete Edition CD 5. Kürten: Stockhausen-Verlag, 1992.
