= Arnold Schönberg Prize =

Classical music award

The International Arnold Schönberg Prize commemorates the eponymous Austrian composer. It was established in 2001 on the initiative of Kent Nagano, the former principal conductor and musical director of the Deutsches Symphonie-Orchester Berlin, together with Deutschlandradio. The prize is awarded by the Arnold Schönberg Center (Vienna, Austria) to international composers. When the prize was instituted, the amount of money awarded was €12,500.

== Winners ==
- 2001 George Benjamin
- 2004 Jörg Widmann
- 2005 Unsuk Chin
- 2006 Aribert Reimann
- 2008 Helmut Oehring
