= Bernarda Albas Haus =

Opera by Aribert Reimann

Bernarda Albas Haus ('The House of Bernarda Alba') is a 2000 German-language opera in three acts by Aribert Reimann to a libretto by the composer after Enrique Beck's German translation of Federico García Lorca's play La casa de Bernarda Alba (1936).
