= Troades (opera) =

Opera by Aribert Reimann

- Opera by Aribert Reimann
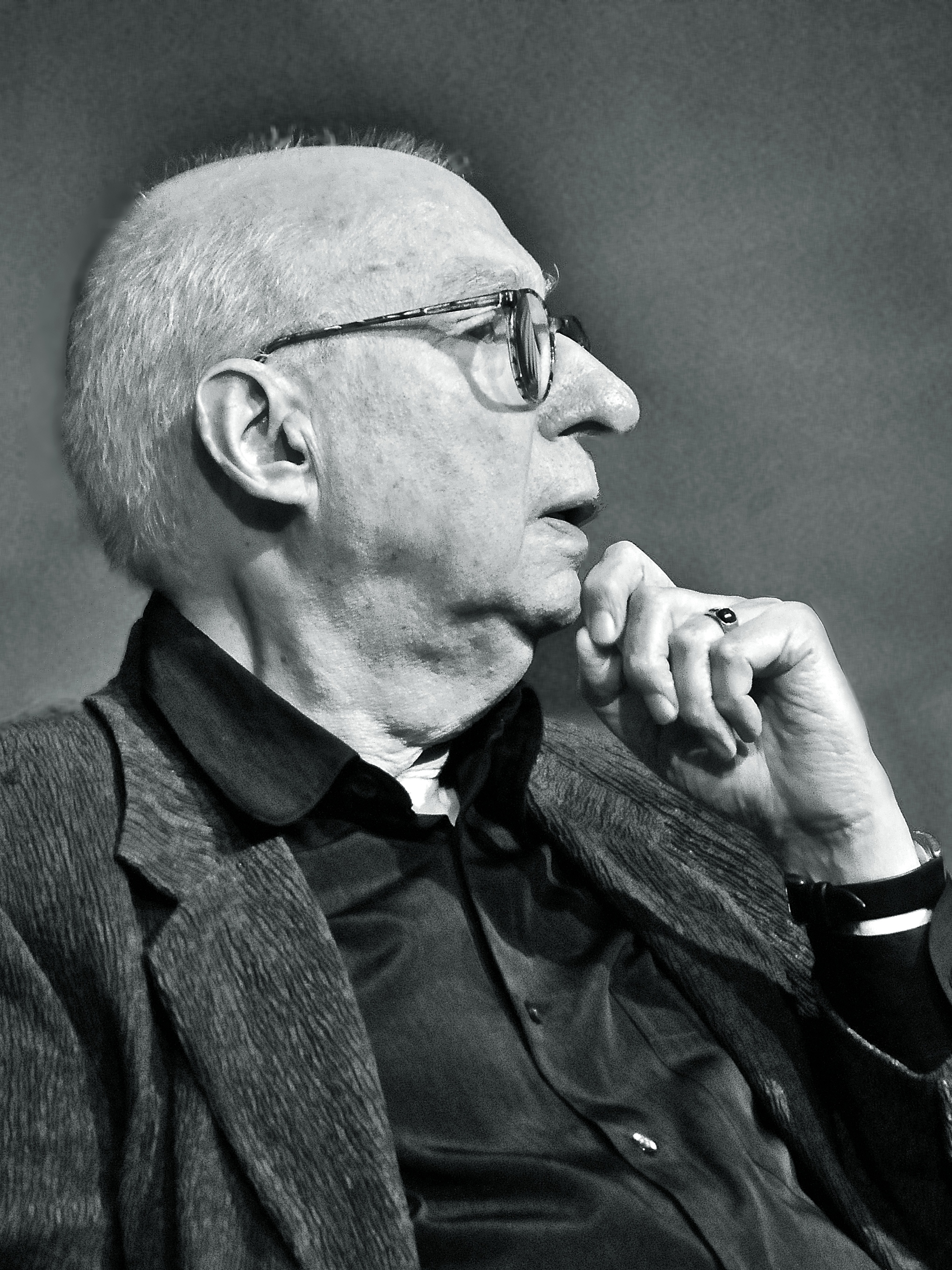
- The composer in 2010
- Librettist: Gerd Albrecht and the composer
- Language: German
- Based on: The Trojan Women by Euripides, author of original text: Franz Werfel
- Premiere: 7 July 1986; National Theatre Munich, Opening of the Munich Opera Festival 1986

Troades is a 1986 German-language opera by Aribert Reimann based on Euripides' The Trojan Women. A recording of the premiere featuring Helga Dernesch and Nicole Heesters, conducted by Gerd Albrecht was recorded and issued on LP and CD by EMI. The opera was commissioned by the Bavarian State Opera, Munich.

== Roles ==
- Hecabe (alto)
- Choir Leader (speaking role)
- Talthybios (baritone)
- Kassandra (mezzo-soprano)
- Andromache (soprano)
- Helena (soprano)
- Menelaus (tenor)
- Athena (speaking role)
- Poseidon (speaking role)
