= Munich Opera Festival =

Music festival

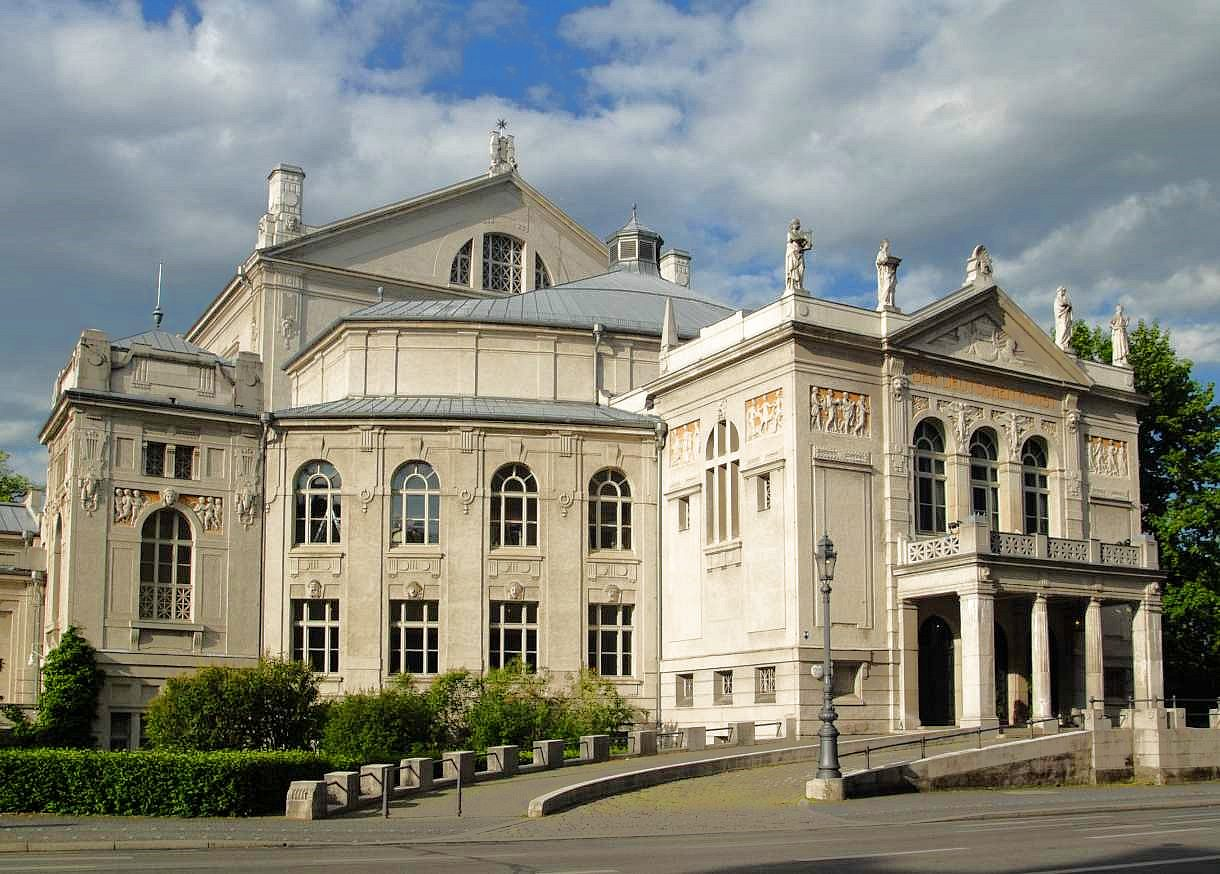
Prinzregententheater, one of the venues for the festival

The Munich Opera Festival (German: Münchner Opernfestspiele) takes place yearly in the Bavarian capital from late June to late July. Preceding on the calendar the two nearby festivals of Bayreuth and Salzburg, which both start in late July, the festival summarizes the concluding main season's work of the Bavarian State Opera, which administers it, and offers premieres of new stage productions by the company, Germany's largest.

Venues used include the Nationaltheater, the Prinzregententheater, the Cuvilliés-Theater and the Allerheiligen-Hofkirche. Besides opera, concerts of chamber music are given to showcase the work of members of the Bavarian State Orchestra, which serves in the pit for all opera performances. The festival is formally opened each year with a choral concert performed as part of a full Roman Catholic church service at Michaelskirche; this is led by the Archbishop of Munich and Freising, with the opera company's music director overseeing the work of the musicians in the organ loft. A festival highlight is Opera for All, the live transmission of a full-length production from the theater to an outdoor audience seated in Max-Joseph-Platz.

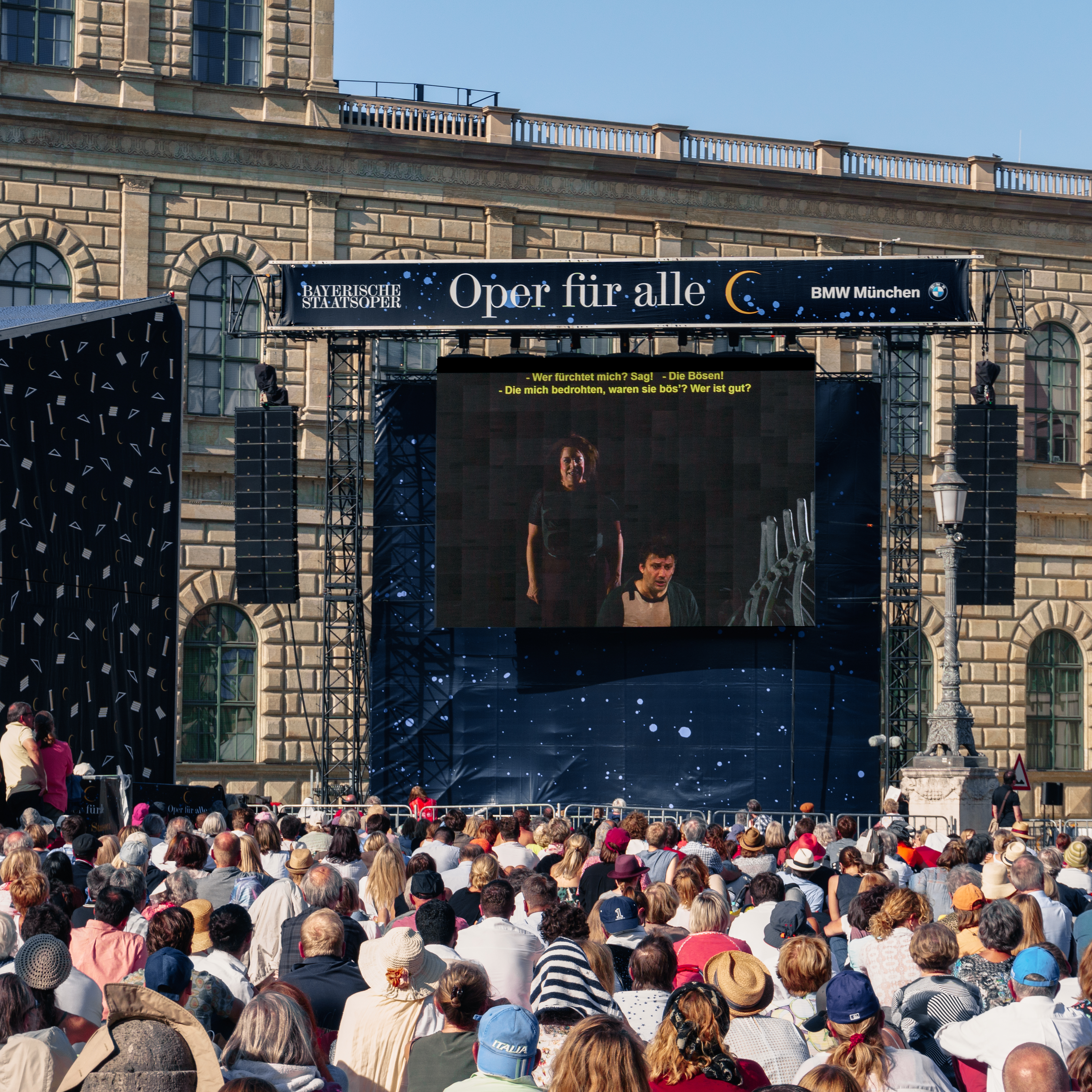
Opera for All screening with Jonas Kaufmann and Nina Stemme in Parsifal
