= Opernhaus Kiel =

Opera house in Kiel

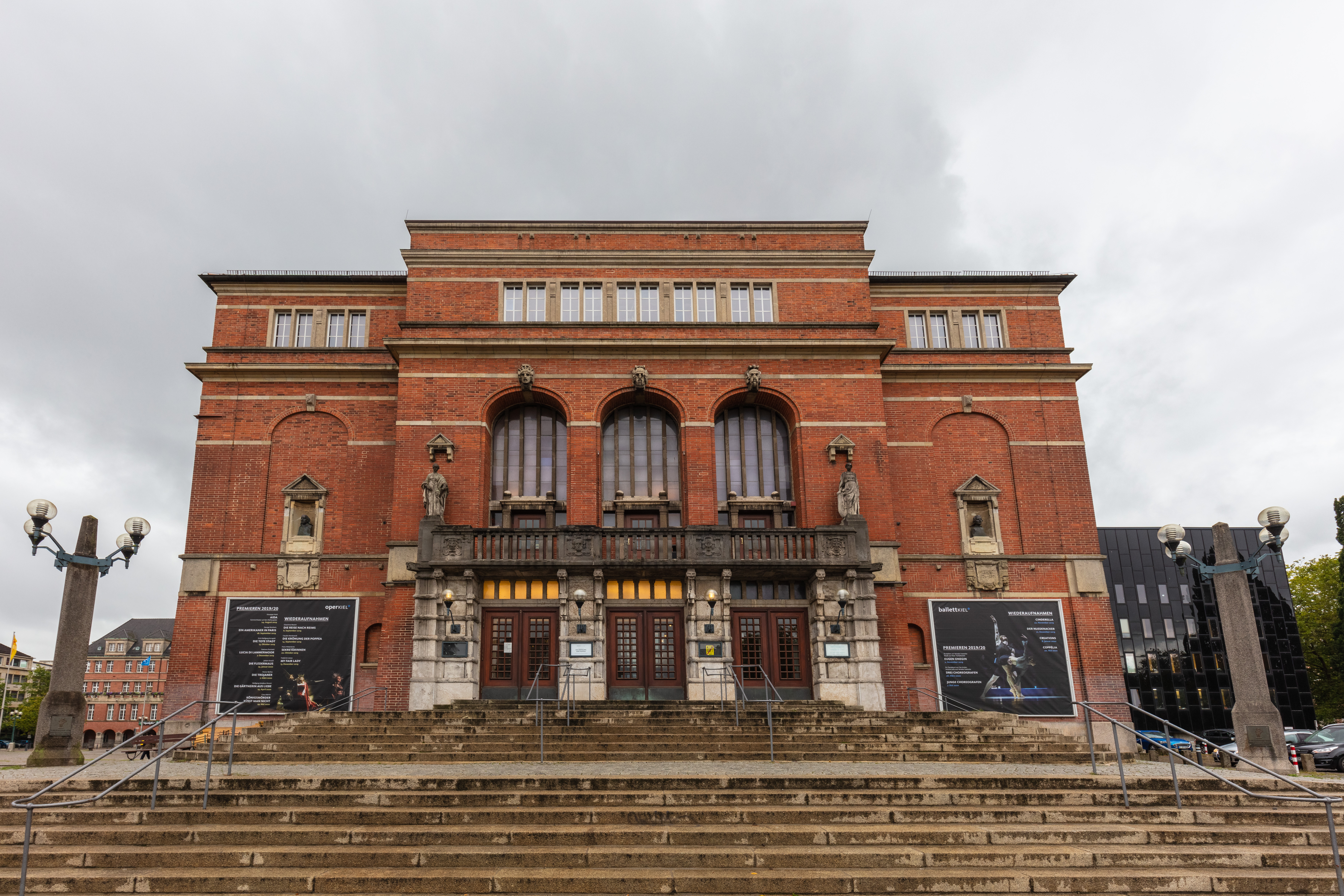
- Main entrance
- Alternative names: Kiel Opera House

General information
- Location: Kiel, Schleswig-Holstein, Germany
- Coordinates: 54°19′23″N 10°08′00″E
- Construction started: 1905
- Completed: 1907
- Renovated: 1952–1953

Design and construction
- Architect: Heinrich Seeling

Website
- www.oper-kiel.de

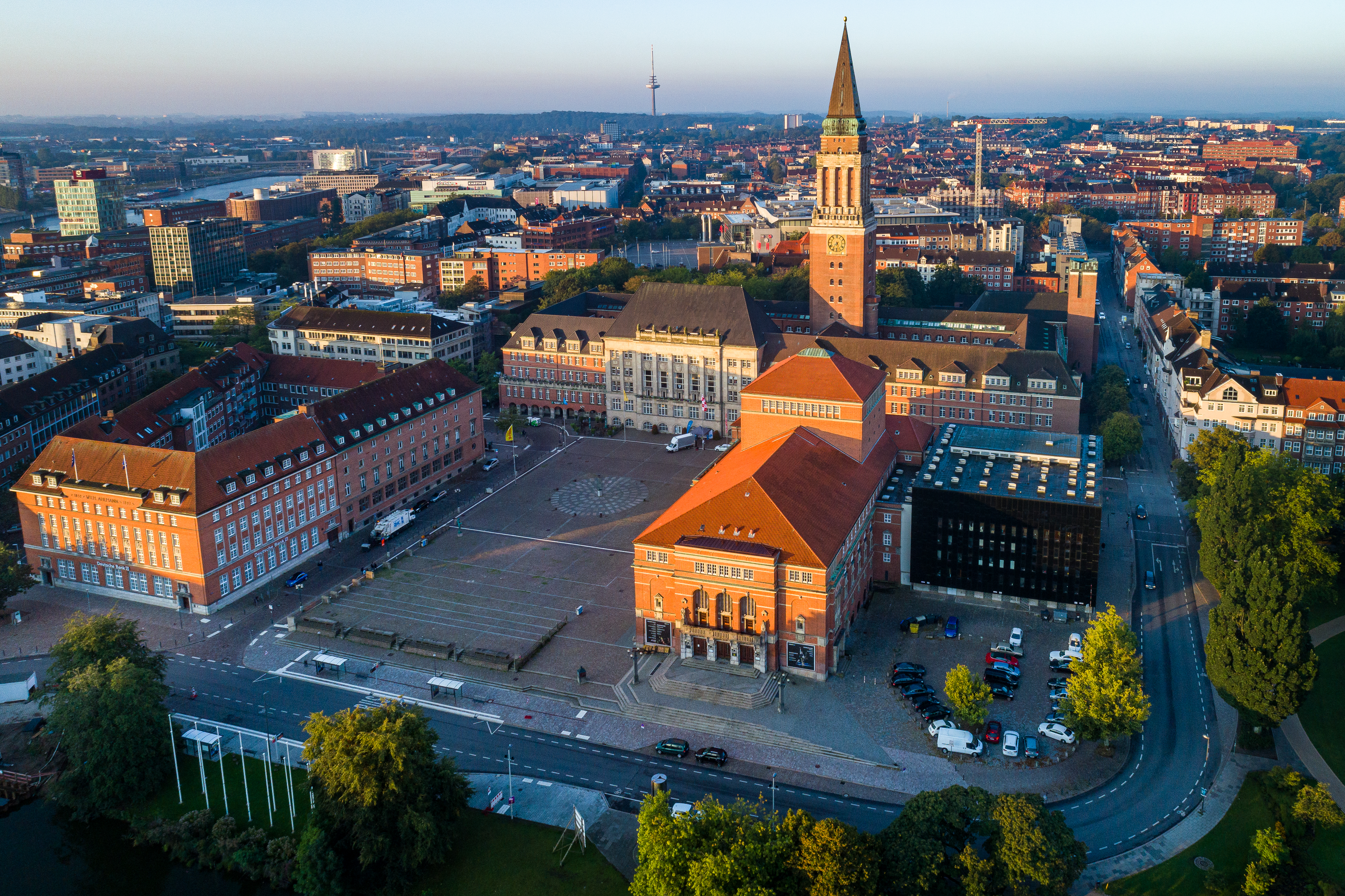
The Kiel Opera House with Kiel Town Hall

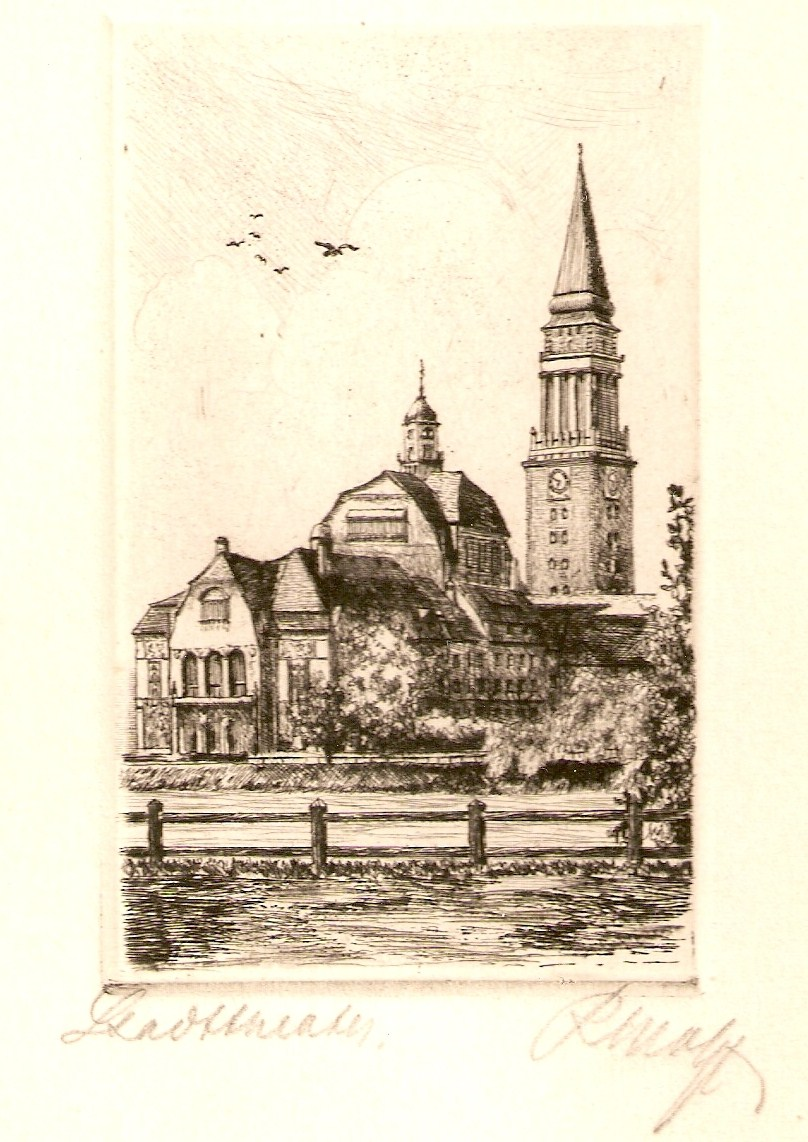
The Kiel Opera House with the Town Hall (1915)

Opernhaus Kiel (Kiel Opera House) is the major venue for opera, ballet, and orchestra performances in Kiel, and home to Theater Kiel. It is a Grade II listed building.

== History ==
After an architectural competition, the Kiel City Council commissioned the architect Heinrich Seeling in 1902 to build the theatre, for both theatre performances and music. The construction of the brick building with a richly arranged sandstone and richly modeled roof zone took place from 1905 to 1907. On October 1, 1907, the theater was inaugurated with a performance of Fidelio.

During the Second World War, Allied air raids on 13 December 1943, 22 May 1944 and 24 July 1944 damaged the city theatres heavily. In the course of the destruction, the Art Nouveau interior decoration was lost. The reconstruction was carried out from 1950 to 1953, under the direction of Heinrich Hansen and Guido Widmann, while retaining the enclosing walls. The roof shapes were redesigned to simplify the cubic stage house. Werner Kallmorgen was responsible for the interior fittings. The reopening of the theatre took place on June 21, 1953, on the occasion of the Kiel Week, again with a performance of Fidelio.

In 1972 the reconstruction of the "Kleine Kiel" stairs was started. In the same year, the foundation stone for the erection of the business building was laid on the corner of Rathausstraße / Fleethörn. The completely black-glazed building according to a design by Werner Kallmorgen has no obvious connection with the architecture of the original ensemble. On 16 March 1993, the opera house was designated a cultural monument of particular importance in the monument register.

The Kiel Ballet was directed by Mario Schröder from 2001 to 2010 as a ballet director and chief choreographer, and in 2011 Yaroslav Ivanenko and Heather Jurgensen took over the ballet management. Since the 2003/04 season, Georg Fritzsch has been Director General Music Director, and from January 1, 2006, to the appointment of general director Daniel Karasek, he was also artistic director of Kiel Opera. Since April 2012 Jörn Sturm has been commercial director of Theater Kiel.
