= David Ameln =

German operatic tenor

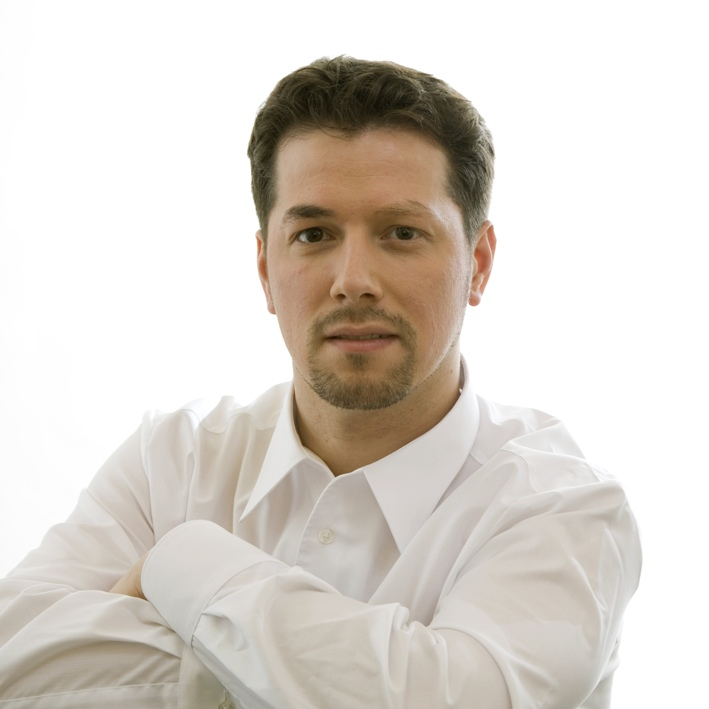
David Ameln 2009 Anhaltisches Theater Dessau

David Ameln (born 21 November 1978) is a German operatic tenor (tenorbuffo).

== Life ==
Born in East-Berlin, Ameln comes from a musical family. His musical education began at the age of four. Ameln sang in the choir from 1982 on at the Schostakowitsch-Musikschule Berlin-Lichtenberg and received piano lessons; until 1992 he was a member of the Rundfunk-Kinderchor Berlin conducted by Manfred Roost. In 1998, he passed his Abitur at the Hans-und-Hilde-Coppi-Gymnasium in Berlin-Karlshorst. From 2000, he studied musicology at Technische Universität Berlin and prepared himself in parallel for his vocal studies.

In the winter semester of 2002/03 he transferred to the Rostock University of Music and Theatre and studied classical singing, first with Anthony Baldwin and later with Christine Bach-Röhr. From 2003 to 2007, he prepared himself for his work in theatre by taking scenic lessons in the opera or drama department. As part of his practical university training he took part in the productions La finta semplice as Francasso, in Häuptling Abendwind as Häuptling Morgenstund and in 2006, together with the mezzo-soprano Ines Thomas Almeida, in the opera Il Campiello by Ermanno Wolf-Ferrari as Donna Pasqua.

Ameln took part in master classes, among others for "Lied interpretation" with Peter Schreier. From 2004 to 2007, he also studied Lied interpretation with Henning Lucius and Karola Theill. Already during his studies, he had engagements at the Allee-Theatre in Hamburg. There he appeared in productions for children as Tamino (The Magic Flute), Belmonte (Die Entführung aus dem Serail, 2007) and Prince Ramiro (La Cenerentola, 2007).

In 2006, he won the International Singing Competition of the Kammeroper Schloss Rheinsberg. He sang there in 2006 Pygmalion in the operetta Die schöne Galathée. Engagements at the Schleswig-Holstein Musik Festival, in Berlin, Hamburg, Brandenburg, Lübeck, and Kiel followed. Furthermore, he had engagements at the Theater Karlshorst in Berlin-Karlshorst. There he impersonated Hans in Schwarzwaldmädel, Armand Brissard in Der Graf von Luxemburg, Jan Janicki in Der Bettelstudent and Josef (Seppl) Fraunhofer in Mask in Blue.

Before completing his diploma, Ameln was engaged to Leipzig and was a permanent ensemble member of the Musical Comedy of the Oper Leipzig for the 2007/08 and 2008/09 seasons. There, he impersonated Gripon in the comic opera Die beiden Geizigen by Grétry, Junker Spärlich in The Merry Wives of Windsor, Marchese Giacomo Pimpinelli in Paganini, Hortensio in Kiss Me, Kate, Annas in Jesus Christ Superstar, Ajax I in the operetta La belle Hélène, Theobald in Schwarzwaldmädel, Jamie in My Fair Lady, Enrico Piselli in Eine Nacht in Venedig and Ambrose Kemper in Hello, Dolly!. Since then his work has focused on operettas and musicals.

In March 2009, he gave a guest performance at the Bühnen der Stadt Gera in the opera Šarlatán by Pavel Haas, where he sang the roles of the Student, the Other Man and the Pharmacist. In December 2009, followed a guest performance at the Staatstheater Darmstadt; there, he sang the role of the court advocate Dr. Blind in the operetta Die Fledermaus. In June 2010, he went on a tour of Japan with the ensemble of the "Schlosstheater Schönbrunn" in Vienna, among others with Jochen Kowalski and Franz Suhrada at his side, also with the operetta Die Fledermaus.

In 2009, he appeared as a guest for the first time at the Anhaltisches Theater. There, Ameln sang in the 2009/10 season among others the street singer Piquillo in the operetta La Périchole and Candide in the musical Candide.

Since the 2010/11 season Ameln has been a permanent member of the Anhaltisches Theater ensemble and has appeared, among other roles, as Pong in Turandot, as Beppe in Pagliacci, as Monostatos in The Magic Flute and as Prince Orlofsky in Die Fledermaus, as Tony in West Side Story, as Kuska and Streschnew in Khovanshchina, as Parpignol in La Bohème and as Bastien in Mozart's Bastien and Bastienne, as Énéas in the German premiere of Massenet's opera Esclarmonde, as Flavio in Norma, as Spoletta in Tosca, as Der Schäbige in Lady Macbeth of Mzensk, as Toni Schlumberger in The Circus Princess, as Remendado in Carmen, as Froh in Das Rheingold, as Ruiz in Il trovatore, as Ari in the Comedian Harmonists and as Steuermann in the Flying Dutchman.

At the 2016 Bayreuth Festival, he appeared as Der Steuermann in Richard Wagner für Kinder (Der fliegende Holländer).

== Concert repertoire ==
Ameln is also active as a concert, song and oratorio singer. Ameln's repertoire in the concert field comprises mainly Passions, Oratorios and Masses settings of the Baroque, the Classic and the Romantic musics.

His concert repertoire includes works by Johann Sebastian Bach (Christmas Oratorio, B Minor Mass, Passions, various cantatas, Magnificat), Georg Friedrich Handel (Messiah), Joseph Haydn (The Creation), Wolfgang Amadeus Mozart, Wolfgang Amadeus Mozart. (Requiem, Masses), Carl Orff's (Carmina Burana), Gioachino Rossini (Petite messe solennelle), Camille Saint-Saëns (Oratorio de Noël), Franz Schubert (Masses in C major, G major, A flat major, E flat major, Op. 24 Heine Lieder, Op. 35 Kerner-Lieder) and Heinrich Schütz (musical exequia, Christmas Story, various motets).

== Scholarships ==
During his studies in Rostock, Ameln received a scholarship for highly gifted students from the Oskar und Vera Ritter-Stiftung Hamburg and was a scholarship holder of the Yehudi Menuhin Live Music Now. In 2011, he was awarded a scholarship for the 100th Bayreuth Festival by the International Association of Wagner Societies.
