= Eva-Maria Bundschuh =

German opera singer (born 1941)

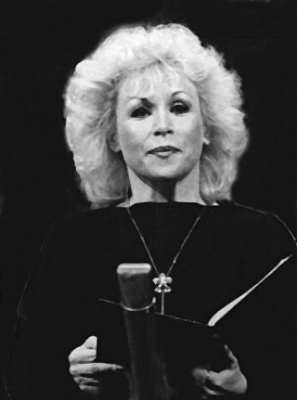
- Eva-Maria Bundschuh in 1987
- Born: 16 October 1941 (age 83); Braunschweig, Germany
- Occupation: Operatic soprano
- Organizations: Komische Oper Berlin

Eva-Maria Bundschuh (born 16 October 1941) is a German operatic soprano who began her career as a contralto. She received international when she collaborated with Harry Kupfer at the Komische Oper Berlin.

== Life and career ==
Born in Braunschweig a carpenter's daughter, Bundschuh grew up with three siblings near Chemnitz, then Karl-Marx-Stadt. House concerts, school choir and especially the church choir made her want to become a singer. Because she was not granted her wish, she secretly took singing lessons with Emmy Senff-Thieß in her home town in addition to her training as a textile master.

She qualified for the Arbeiter-Musiktheater Aue, where she was admitted in the role of Dorabella in Mozart's Così fan tutte. Without the prescribed professional training one could usually not pass the Bühnenreifeprüfung (stage performer certificate), nevertheless she was allowed to prove her suitability before a commission of leading directors and theatre directors of the German Democratic Republic (GDR) in the Berlin artists club Die Möwe. She then had the choice between three provincial stages. In 1967 she made her debut at the Carl-Maria-von-Weber-Theater in Bernburg as Hänsel in Humperdinck's Hänsel und Gretel.

In 1969 she moved to the opera house in Karl-Marx-Stadt. In 1986 she reported on this phase of her life to the daily Der Morgen: "I was the Third Lady, the 7th woman and the waitress carrying a tray across the stage and singing a sentence. Everything was important to me, even from the smallest tasks I tried to do something. But for a five-minute performance for a whole evening this big heart flutter – should that be all?"

Voice teacher Helga Forner accepted her as a pupil in 1972, and she won the highest award in the GDR National Opera Competition the same year. Her next position was in 1974 at the Hans Otto Theatre in Potsdam where she worked first as mezzo-soprano. Under Peter Brähmig she switched to the soprano repertoire as a result of tutoring by various female colleagues. Bundschuh's ability to sing higher than she had before (with a range now totaling three octaves) was also thanks to Forner, who was her teacher for years to come. During three years as mezzo-soprano, she portrayed Bizet's Carmen, Dorabella in Mozart's Così fan tutte and Princess Eboli in Verdi's Don Carlos). As a soprano, she appeared in Offenbach's Hoffmanns Erzählungen, and in the title role of Verdi's La traviata.

She appeared as a guest at the Berlin State Opera from 1976. When she appeared there in 1979 as Cleopatra in Handel's Giulio Cesare in the production of Erhard Fischer she made a breakthrough. She also appeared at the house as Marcellina in Rossini's Der Barbier von Sevilla and in 1979 as Freia in Wagner's Das Rheingold, staged by Ruth Berghaus and conducted by Otmar Suitner. She travelled with the ensemble to Japan.

The 1981/82 season marked the beginning of her collaboration with the director Harry Kupfer at the Komische Oper Berlin, which was highly regarded internationally. She remained there to 1988, singing roles such as Regan in Aribert Reimann's Lear, Musette in Puccini's La bohème and Eva in Wagner's Die Meistersinger von Nürnberg.

In 1983 she appeared as Donna Anna in Mozart's Don Giovanni at the Leipzig Opera. In 1984 she was awarded the title Kammersängerin. On New Year's Eve 1984 she played Rosalinde in Die Fledermaus by Johann Strauss. Kupfer and conductor Rolf Reuter helped her, with assigning her the title role in the world premiere of Siegfried Matthus' opera Judith at the Komische Oper on 28 September 1985, to receive a special prize of the Ministry of Culture in the GDR. Towards the end of her time at the Komische Oper she sang the title role of Salome by Richard Strauss.

She appeared in the title role of Janáček's Jenůfa at the restored Staatsoper in 1986, toured as Senta in Wagner's Der fliegende Holländer, and later as Gutrune in Wagner's Götterdämmerung at the Bayreuth Festival. In 1988 Bundschuh appeared as Isolde in Wagner's Tristan und Isolde. In 1990 she sang the soprano part in Beethoven's Ninth Symphony with the Cleveland Orchestra conducted by Christoph von Dohnányi. From 1999 to 2004 she appeared again on stage in a Lear production by Willy Decker, now as Goneril, at the Semperoper in Dresden.

== Recordings ==
- Handel: Solomon, 3-CD-Box-Set, conductor: Heinz Rögner, cast: Eva-Maria Bundschuh, Marga Schiml, Eberhard Büchner, Berlin Classics/Edel
- Matthus: Judith, double-CD, with Werner Haseleu, Ensemble of the Komische Oper Berlin, conductor: Rolf Reuter, Berlin Classics/Ede] 0093392
- Schönberg: Gurre-Lieder, double-CD, conductor: Herbert Kegel, Berlin Classics/Edel
- Wagner: Götterdämmerung, double-DVD, choir and orchestra of the Bayreuth Festival, conductor: Daniel Barenboim, director: Harry Kupfer, cast: Siegfried Jerusalem, Bodo Brinkmann, Philip Kang, Eva-Maria Bundschuh, among others, Warner Music Group
