= Georg Quander =

German opera and film director, music journalist (born 1950)

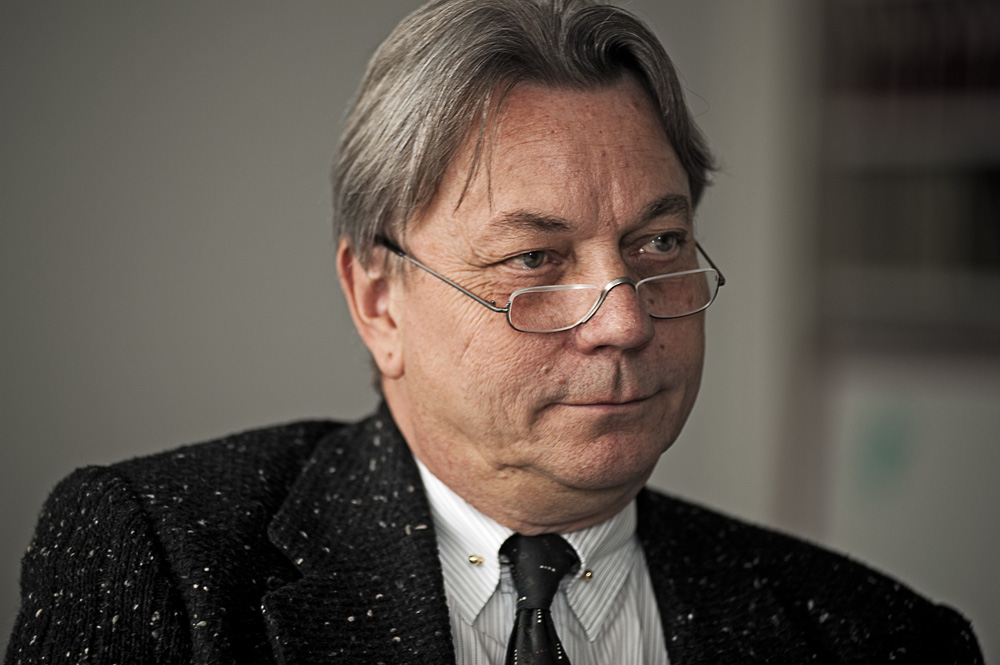
Quander in 2011

Georg Quander (born 29 November 1950) is a German opera and film director, music journalist, writer and culture manager. From 1991 to 2002, he was artistic director of the Deutsche Staatsoper Berlin. From 2005 to 2013, he was councillor for arts and culture of the city of Cologne. Since 2018, he has been the artistic director of the Musikkultur Rheinsberg gGmbH.

== Life and career ==
Quander was born in Düsseldorf. Quander, the son of the veterinarian Joachim Quander, studied theatre studies, musicology, art history and Altamerikanistik at the FU Berlin after his Abitur in 1970 at the Görres-Gymnasium in Düsseldorf. He worked since 1973 during his studies as a dramaturge, freelance music journalist and author for various radio stations, newspapers and cultural institutions. From 1979, Quander was music editor at the then Sender Freies Berlin radio and television station (until 1987), and from 1988 to 1991 he worked as head of the music and entertainment department at the then Rundfunk im amerikanischen Sektor Berlin.

From 1991 to 2002, he was artistic director of the Staatsoper Unter den Linden Berlin alongside the general music director Daniel Barenboim. During this time, he transformed the GDR state opera into a modern opera company and reduced the number of employees from around 1,400 to 700, without any scandals. In addition to the artistic re-profiling of the house, his main concern was to return the opera house Unter den Linden to the ranks of the world's leading opera houses, to which it had always belonged in its long history and before the Nazi era and German division. He engaged renowned directors such as Harry Kupfer, Patrice Chéreau, Dieter Dorn, Jürgen Flimm, Peter Mussbach and Peter Greenaway and brought in conductors such as Zubin Mehta, Claudio Abbado, Carlo Maria Giulini, Christoph von Dohnányi, Georg Solti and Michael Gielen regularly to the house. A particular focus of the work was the cultivation of the baroque and pre-classical operatic repertoire, most of which was realised in collaboration with the conductor René Jacobs and for the first time in the repertoire of a major opera house, consistently on original instruments in accordance with the findings of historical performance practice. In addition, Quander repeatedly commissioned world premières.

In 2001, the Bremen Senate appointed him professor. As an honorary professor, he taught in the part-time course Music and Cultural Management at the Bremen University of Applied Sciences.

On 28 April 2005, Georg Quander, who is not a member of any political party, was elected by a large majority of the Cologne City Council for a term of eight years as Head of the Department of Arts and Culture on the proposal of the CDU and the Sozialdemokratische Partei Deutschlands. He thus succeeded Marie Hüllenkremer, who died suddenly, after the candidacy of Christoph Nix, the theatre director in Kassel, failed.

During his term of office, Quander worked, among other things, for a considerable increase in the culture budget, which was raised by about 50 % from € 99 million to € 156 million in the years up to 2009. He strengthened the budgets of Cologne's 9 municipal museums, restored their acquisition and exhibition budgets, ensured better funding for the opera, theatre and Gürzenich Orchestra as well as increased support for the independent scene.

Under the motto "Cultural Metropolis on the Rhine", a cultural development plan was drawn up at the end of 2008, which was then discussed and adopted by the city council.

Quander also made numerous important personnel decisions for Cologne's cultural life. For example, he brought the director Karin Beier to the Schauspiel Köln as artistic director, which under her leadership developed into one of the most successful German drama theatres, was voted Theatre of the Year several times and was regularly invited to the Theatertreffen in Berlin. She was succeeded by Stefan Bachmann in 2013 at Quander's suggestion. After Christoph Damann's departure, he appointed Uwe Eric Laufenberg as artistic director of the Cologne Opera in 2009, who successfully repositioned it and won the title of Critics' Poll of the Opernwelt for his 2011/12 season. At the same time, the house was voted Annoyance of the Year because the city of Cologne had terminated Laufenberg's contract without notice (and later had to agree to a mutually agreed cancellation of the contract). Quander's term of office also saw new appointments to the directorates of the Historical Archives, the City Library and the City Conservator, as well as 6 of the 9 city museum directors.

In 2009, the Historical Archive of the City of Cologne collapsed due to the construction of the underground railway. The majority of the valuable historical documents from over 1000 years of the city's history, which were buried under rubble, were recovered in an unprecedented rescue operation and have since been made readable and usable again in the large newly established restoration and digitisation centre.

In December 2012, the Council of the City of Cologne voted against his re-election as Head of the Department of Culture. The parliamentary groups of SPD, Greens and FDP voted against, the CDU, Linke and the remaining council members voted for an extension. Numerous cultural initiatives, such as the theatre conference and initiatives of the independent scene, the Cologne Cultural Network, the Cologne Cultural Council, heads of municipal cultural institutions, the Gürzenich Orchestra Cologne, the sponsoring associations of the municipal museums in Cologne and the staff council of the cultural administration had spoken out in favour of his re-election. Quander's term of office ended on 31 May 2013.

In the years 2014–2018, Quander worked freelance. For example, he filmed a four-part television documentary on the opera houses in North Rhine-Westphalia for WDR, whose extensive research he also published as a book in the Cologne Wieland Verlag. Furthermore, at the Innsbruck Festival of Early Music Johann Adolph Hasse's early opera Semele. In 2018, he was appointed by the supervisory board of Musikkultur Rheinsberg gGmbH as artistic director of the institute that emerged from the Kammeroper Schloss Rheinsberg and the Bundes- und Landesmusikakademie Rheinsberg. Here he is responsible for the profile and further development of the Music Academy as well as the International Festival of Young Opera Singers founded by Siegfried Matthus. In 2019, he also founded the Kammeroper Schloss Rheinsberg and staged Domenico Cimarosa's famous but rarely performed opera Gli Orazio e i Curiazi. as part of the summer festival.

Georg Quander was married to Jutta, née Blaznik (1954–2013), and has two daughters.

== Films ==
- 1983: for the ARD Pictures at an Exhibition after Wassily Kandinsky and Modest Mussorgsky
- 1986: for the ARD Die Sterne dürfet Ihr verschwenden. 25 Jahre Deutsche Oper Berlin, Buch und Regie
- 1986: Aufforderung zum Tanz. Piao work by Carl Maria von Weber, 1986
- 1986–1988: for the ARD fünfteilige Filmdokumentation Musikstadt Berlin
- 1994: for the ARD Filmdokumentation über die Inszenierung von Harry Kupfer, The Tales of Hoffmann
- 2015–2016: for the WDR Wie du warst! Wie du bist! – Das Opernland Nordrhein-Westfalen. Vierteilige Filmdokumentation

== World premieres and productions ==
- 1980 World premiere at the Schwetzingen Festival Hippolytus and Aricia, German text version after Simon-Joseph Pellegrin and Jean-Philippe Rameau
- 1981 world premiere at the Berliner Festwochen of Montezuma by Carl Heinrich Graun, German text version after Frederick the Great / P. Tagliazucchi
- 1984 Book and production The Silence of Lord Chandos after Hugo von Hofmannsthal, music by J. Brettingham Smith, (world premiere at the Berliner Festwochen)
- 1987 production Belshazar by Volker David Kirchner at the Staatstheater Braunschweig
- 1993 production Turandot by Giacomo Puccini at the Staatstheater Saarbrücken
- 1994 production Hansel and Gretel by Engelbert Humperdinck at the Staatstheater Saarbrücken
- 1997 and 1999 production Solimano by Johann Adolph Hasse in Innsbruck and at the Deutsche Staatsoper Berlin
- 2000 Robert le diable by Giacomo Meyerbeer at the Deutsches Staatsoper Berlin
- 2003 Production of Der Freischütz at the Theater Koblenz
- 2004 production of The Marriage of Figaro at the Ludwigsburger Schlossfestspiele
- 2018 production of Semele by Johann Adolph Hasse, Innsbruck Festival of Early Music
- 2019 production of Gli Orazi e i Curiazi by Domenico Cimarosa, Kammeroper Schloss Rheinsberg

== Publications ==
- "Montezuma als Gegenbild des großen Friedrich". In Preußen. Versuch einer Bilanz, vol. 4, Rowohlt Verlag, Berlin 1981, pp. 121–134.
- "Schauplätze für Musik. Tendenzen im amerikanischen Musiktheater der Gegenwart", in Hellmuth Kühn: Musiktheater heute. Mainz among others, 1982, pages 105ff.
- Edited with Hellmut Kühn: Gustav Mahler. Ein Lesebuch mit Bildern. Orell Füssli, Zürich 1982, ISBN 3-280-01377-1.
- "Vom Minimal zum Maximal: Gedanken zu Satyagraha von Philip Glass". In Neue Zeitschrift für Musik, vol. 143, 1/1982, pp. 43–46.
- "Vom Minimal zum Maximal: Zum Problem der musikalischen Disposition, der Zeitstruktur und der Wirklichkeitsstufen in Phil Glass' Oper Satyagraha". In Oper heute. Studien zur Wertungsforschung, vol. 16, Böhlau Verlag, Vienna, Graz 1985.
- "Das Schweigen des Lord Chandos. Eine musikalische Hommage à Hugo von Hofmannsthal". In: Hofmannsthal-Forschungen, vol. 8, pp. 217–232, Hofmannsthal-Gesellschaft, Freiburg i. Br. 1985.
- Appolini et Musis. 250 Jahre Opernhaus Unter den Linden Propyläen-Verlag, Berlin 1992
- Klangbilder – Portrait der Staatskapelle Berlin. Propyläen-Verlag, Berlin 1995
- with Walter Rösler, Manfred Haedler, Micaela von Marcard (ed.): Das Zauberschloß Unter den Linden. Die Berliner Staatsoper. Geschichte und Geschichten von den Anfängen bis heute. Verlag Ed. q, 1997, ISBN 3-86124-334-2.
- Staatsoper unter den Linden (ed.): Staatsoper unter den Linden 1991–2002. Da capo al Fine, Selbstverlag, Berlin 2002.
- Opernland Nordrhein-Westfalen. Wienand Verlag 2018, ISBN 978-3868324617.
