= Marco Jentzsch =

German operatic tenor (born 1974)

Marco Jentzsch (born 1974) is a German operatic tenor with a focus on Heldentenor roles.

== Life and career ==
Born in Potsdam in 1974, Jentzsch studied Social pedagogy and then worked for ten years in a rehabilitation centre. He took voice lessons with Els Bolkestein from 2002. After winning the 2003 Kammeroper Rheinsberg competition, he made his stage debut as Tamino in Mozarts Die Zauberflöte there in 2004. He continued his studies with Irmgard Hartmann-Dressler (1924–2013) at the Hochschule der Künste Berlin. In 2005 he joined the ensemble of the Theater Erfurt, moving to the Staatsoper Hannover in 2006. In 2009 he first appeared at the Cologne Opera, then at the Komische Oper Berlin, in 2010 at the Nederlandse Opera in Amsterdam and La Scala in Milan, in 2011 at the Glyndebourne Festival. He performed at the Hamburg State Opera, Oper Leipzig, in Tel Aviv, Zürich and Basel, at the Hessisches Staatstheater Wiesbaden and the Semperoper in Dresden. He has performed with conductors such as Daniel Barenboim, Markus Poschner and Zubin Mehta. Jentzsch performed the title role of Offenbach's Les contes d'Hoffmann first at the Volksoper Wien in the late 2010s, the title role of Wagner's Tannhäuser first at the Stadttheater Klagenfurt, and as Florestan in Beethovens Fidelio first at the Musiktheater Linz in 2020. He portrayed the title role of Wagner's Tristan und Isolde in Wiesbaden in 2021, conducted by Michael Güttler and directed by Uwe Eric Laufenberg, alongside Barbara Haveman as Isolde. He portrayed Tannhäuser in 2024 at the Oper Frankfurt, conducted by Thomas Guggeis and directed by Matthew Wild.

== Awards ==
- 2003 and 2004 Internationaler Gesangswettbewerb Kammeroper Schloss Rheinsberg
- 2006 Emmerich Smola Förderpreis
