= Michael Volle =

German baritone (born 1960)

- Born: 1960 (age 65–66); Freudenstadt, West Germany
- Education: Musikhochschule Trossingen; Musikhochschule Stuttgart
- Occupation: Operatic baritone
- Organizations: Nationaltheater Mannheim; Bonn Opera; Deutsche Oper am Rhein; Cologne Opera; Opernhaus Zürich; Bavarian State Opera
- Awards: Merkur-Theaterpreis; Der Faust

Michael Volle (German: ['fɔl.lɛ]; born 1960) is a German operatic baritone. After engagements at several German and Swiss opera houses, he has worked freelance since 2011. While he first appeared in Mozart roles such as Guglielmo, Papageno and Don Giovanni, he moved on to title roles such as Verdi's Falstaff, Tchaikovsky's Eugene Onegin and Alban Berg's Wozzeck. He has performed at major opera houses in Europe and the Metropolitan Opera, in roles including Mandryka in Arabella and Hans Sachs in Die Meistersinger von Nürnberg. His awards include Singer of the Year by the magazine Opernwelt and Der Faust.

== Life ==
Volle was born in Freudenstadt in the Black Forest in 1960, (Note: other sources give 1959 and 1964?) the son of a Protestant pastor and the youngest of eight siblings. His brothers are the actor Hartmut Volle and the opera singer Dietrich Volle. He studied voice at the Musikhochschule Trossingen and Musikhochschule Stuttgart with Josef Sinz and Georg Jelden, and also studied with Josef Metternich and Rudolf Piernay. He was first engaged at the Nationaltheater Mannheim in 1990, where leading roles included Guglielmo in Mozart's Così fan tutte and Papageno in Die Zauberflöte, Wolfram in Wagner's Tannhäuser, and Albert in Massenet's Werther. He belonged to the ensemble of the Bonn Opera from 1994, where he appeared as Mozart's Don Giovanni, Silvio in Leoncavallo's Pagliacci, and the Count in Lortzing's Der Wildschütz. He was engaged by the Deutsche Oper am Rhein from 1996, and by the Cologne Opera from 1998, where he appeared as Marcello in Puccini's La Bohème and as Ford in Verdi's Falstaff. He was a member of the ensemble of the Opernhaus Zürich from 1999 to 2007. He then moved to the Bavarian State Opera in Munich, where he appeared as Alfonso in Così fan tutte, Amfortas in Wagner's Parsifal, and in the title roles of Tchaikovsky's Eugen Onegin and Alban Berg's Wozzeck, among others. For his portrayal of Wozzeck, he was awarded the theatre prize Der Faust in 2009. Since 2011, he has worked freelance.

Volle appeared as a guest at major German and European opera houses, as Heerrufer in Wagner's Lohengrin at the Opéra National de Paris in 1996, as the Speaker in Mozart's Zauberflöte at La Scala in 1998, at the Royal Opera House Covent Garden, the Deutsche Oper Berlin, and La Monnaie in Brussels, among others. At the Vienna State Opera, he appeared in the title role of Wagner's Der fliegende Holländer, Count Almaviva in Mozart's Le nozze di Figaro, and as Don Giovanni, Scarpia and Amfortas.

Volle also appeared at the Salzburg Festival as Tamare in Schreker's Die Gezeichneten, in the double role of Dr. Schön and Jack the Ripper in Berg's Lulu, and in 2013 as Hans Sachs in Wagner's Die Meistersinger von Nürnberg. In 2007 he made his debut at the Bayreuth Festival as Sixtus Beckmesser in Die Meistersinger von Nürnberg. He was Hans Sachs there in the highly acclaimed production of the work in 2017, directed by Barrie Kosky. In 2018, he first sang the title role of Verdi's Falstaff at the Staatsoper Berlin, conducted by Daniel Barenboim. He made his first appearance at the Metropolitan Opera as Mandryka in Arabella by Richard Strauss, followed by performances as Hans Sachs there.

Volle lives in Berlin; he is in his second marriage, to the Swiss opera singer Gabriela Scherer.

== Awards ==
- 2008: Singer of the Year, by Opernwelt
- 2008: Merkur-Theaterpreis of Münchner Merkur
- 2009: Der Faust
- 2014: nominated for the International Opera Awards in the category Best Singer

== Discography ==
CD

- Zemlinsky: Der Traumgörge. EMI
- Schubert: Winterreise. Animato
- Schubert: Schwanengesang. Naxos
- Bach: St Matthew Passion. EMI
- Songs by Great Conductors. Oehms

DVD

- Schreker: Die Gezeichneten. Euroarts
- Bellini: Beatrice di Tenda. TDK
- Weber: Der Freischütz. Constantin Film 2010
- Wagner: Die Meistersinger von Nürnberg. EMI
- Puccini: La Bohème. EMI
- Wagner: Parsifal. Deutsche Grammophon
- Debussy: Pelléas et Mélisande. TDK
- Schubert: Fierrabras. EMI
- Richard Strauss: Salome. Opus Arte
- Richard Strauss: Ariadne auf Naxos. TDK
