= Matthew Wild =

South African stage director

- Born: South Africa
- Education: University of Cape Town
- Occupations: Stage director; Theatre manager
- Organization: Cape Town Opera

Matthew Wild is a South African theatre director and stage director, especially of opera. He was artistic director of the Cape Town Opera from 2015 to 2021. Wild works internationally, directing Boesmans' Julie at NorrlandsOperan and the Malmö Opera in 2009, the world premiere of Philip Miller's Between a Rock and a Hard Place at the Royal Swedish Opera in 2013, Janáček's Káťa Kabanová at the Staatstheater Wiesbaden in 2016, Gershwin's Porgy and Bess at the Theater an der Wien in 2019, and Wagner's Tannhäuser at the Oper Frankfurt in 2024.

== Career ==
Born in South Africa, Wild studied drama and English studies at the University of Cape Town. His first direction was in 2000 a work he had written while still studying. He directed contemporary plays including Brent Palmer's Witnesses, John van der Ruit's Crooked, Dalliances by Pieter Jacobs, Brett Goldin's Bad Apple, Nhlanhla Mavundla's A Man and a Dog and Nicholas Spagnoletti's Special Thanks to Guests from Afar. He first directed a work by Shakespeare in 2012, staging The Comedy of Errors at the Maynardville Open-Air Theatre, earning him a Fleur du Cap nomination as best director.

His first opera production was Boesmans' Julie at NorrlandsOperan and the Malmö Opera in 2009. In 2013 he directed the world premiere of Philip Miller's Between a Rock and a Hard Place at the Royal Swedish Opera in Stockholm in 2013. He directed his first musical in 2013, O’Briens The Rocky Horror Show at the Fugard Theatre, followed by Cabaret in 2015.

Wild was artistic director of the Cape Town Opera from 2015 to 2021. He staged there Handel's Alcina, Gluck's Orphée et Eurydice, Mozart's Cosi fan tutte, Don Giovanni and Die Zauberflöte, Donizetti's Maria Stuarda, Rossini's Il viaggio a Reims, Wagner's Der fliegende Holländer, Salome by R. Strauss, Puccini's Suor Angelica, Stravinsky's The Rake's Progress, and Menotti's The Medium.

Wild made his debut in Germany in 2016, directing Janáček's Káťa Kabanová at the Staatstheater Wiesbaden. His production of Gershwin's Porgy and Bess at the Theater an der Wien was nominated for 2022 Austrian Music Theatre prizes. He directed Humperdinck's Königskinder at the 2021 Tyrol Festival in Erl.

He directed Wagner's Tannhäuser at the Oper Frankfurt in 2024, conducted by Thomas Guggeis and with Marco Jentzsch in the title role. Wild set the story in California in 1961, where a fictional author Heinrich Ofterdingen (named like the minnesanger who was a model for Tannhäuser) who had left Nazi Germany, was professor of literature, earning the Pulitzer Prize, but disappeared. When returned and celebrated, he comes out as homosexual kissing a young man in the lecture theatre, causing a scandal. The shocked people in the audience destroy the books that he just signed, only Elisabeth collects his notes to publish them. The director's approach took into account that Tannhäuser was a favourite with homosexuals such as Wagner's patron Ludwig II of Bavaria, Wagner's son Siegfried, and Oscar Wilde. The story is also related to German emigrants to California including Thomas Mann, whose figure Tadzio from Death in Venice was quoted. The production was chosen as a "staging of the year" by the critics of Opernwelt.
