= Judith (Matthus) =

1985 opera in two acts by Siegfried Matthus

- Opera by Siegfried Matthus
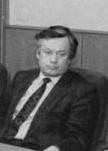
- Matthus in 1990
- Librettist: Siegfried Matthus
- Language: German
- Based on: Friedrich Hebbel: Judith; Old Testament
- Premiere: 28 September 1985; Komische Oper Berlin

Judith is an opera in two acts by Siegfried Matthus with a libretto by the composer based on Friedrich Hebbel's Judith and texts from the Old Testament. The premiere was on 28 September 1985 at the Komische Oper Berlin, directed by Harry Kupfer. It was recorded in a studio production.

== History ==
The composer Siegfried Matthus was pointed to Friedrich Hebbel's Judith, a tragedy written in 1840, by stage director Harry Kupfer. Matthus wrote the libretto, also using some texts from the Old Testament, such as Psalm 115, Psalm 135, Psalm 72, Psalm 104 and verses from the Song of Songs. Hebbel's tragedy is based on the Book of Judith. At the same time Matthus composed Holofernes-Porträt for baritone and orchestra, which was premiered in 1981 during the opening week of the new Gewandhaus, with Dietrich Fischer-Dieskau and conductor Kurt Masur. Matthus transferred parts of the composition to his opera, which he composed from 1980 to 1984.

Judith was planned for the opening of the restored Semperoper in Dresden. As Kupfer worked in Berlin from 1981, the opera was premiered at the Komische Oper Berlin on 28 September 1985, staged by Kupfer and conducted by Rolf Reuter, with Eva-Maria Bundschuh in the title role and Werner Haseleu as Holofernes. The production was a success and was recorded for the television of the German Democratic Republic and for records.

Judith was published by Breitkopf & Härtel, with a translation to English by B. Jacobson.

== Recording ==
The first performance was recorded in 1986, conducted by Rolf Reuter and staged by Kupfer, with the chorus and orchestra of the Komische Oper Berlin, as a studio production in collaboration with the Rundfunk der DDR.
