= Bogdan Volkov =

Ukrainian operatic tenor

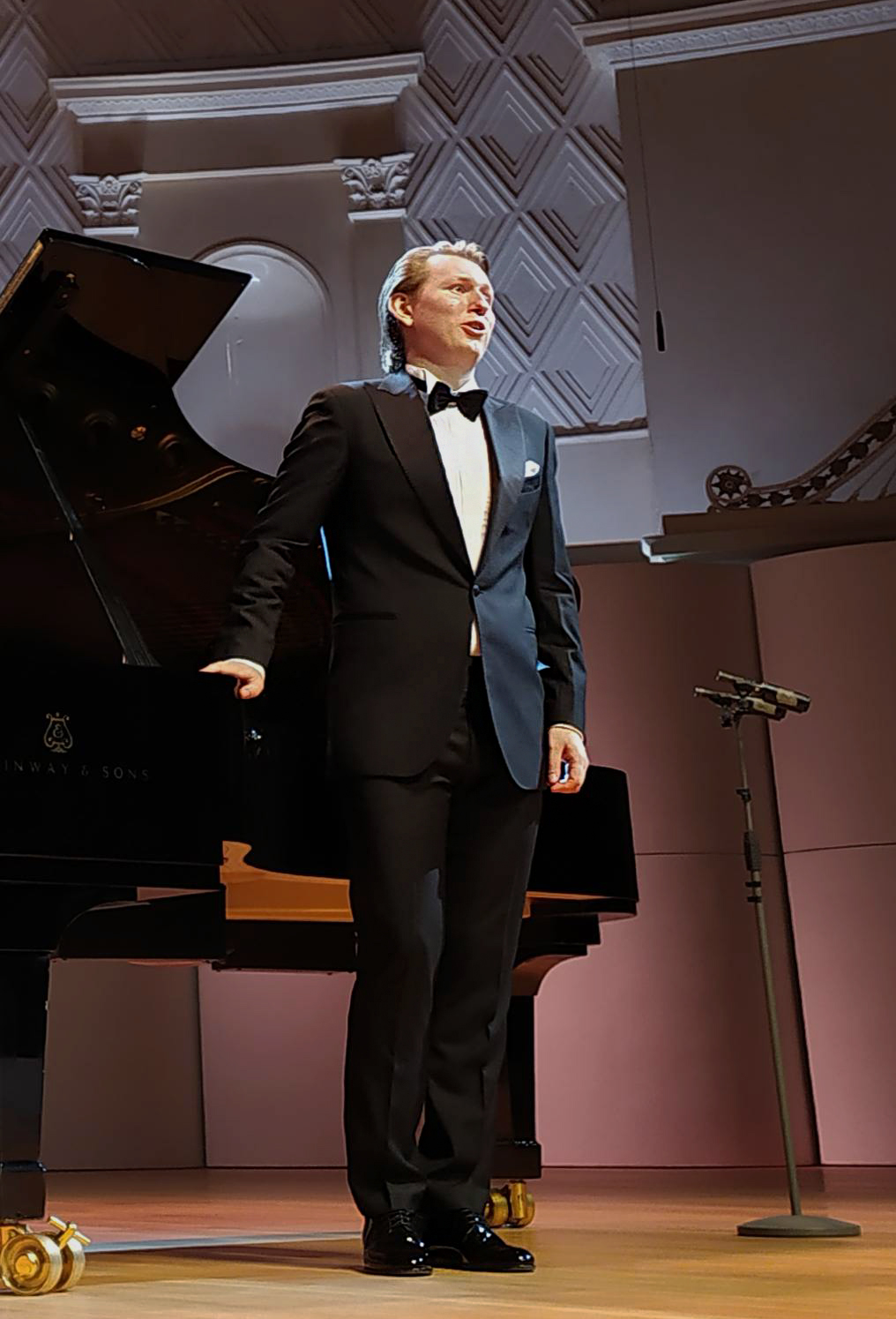
- Volkov in 2020
- Born: December 7, 1989 (age 36); Chystiakove, Donetsk Oblast, Ukraine
- Education: R. Glier Kyiv Institute of Music; Ukrainian National Tchaikovsky Academy of Music
- Occupation: Operatic tenor

Bogdan Volkov (born 7 December 1989) is a Ukrainian-born Austrian operatic tenor. He was named Singer of the Year 2025 by the German magazine Opernwelt, and has performed at leading opera houses including the Metropolitan Opera, La Scala, the Royal Opera House, the Vienna State Opera, the Opéra national de Paris and the Salzburg Festival.

== Early life and education ==
Volkov was born on 7 December 1989 in Chystiakove, Donetsk Oblast, Ukraine. He studied at the R. Glier Kyiv Institute of Music and graduated from the Ukrainian National Tchaikovsky Academy of Music.

== Career ==
From the 2013–14 to the 2015–16 seasons, Volkov was a member of the Young Artists Opera Program of the Bolshoi Theatre in Moscow, making his debut there as Lykov in Rimsky-Korsakov's The Tsar's Bride. He was a member of the Bolshoi ensemble from 2016 to 2018. He won the First Prize and Audience Prize at the Paris Opera Competition in 2015 and Second Prize at Plácido Domingo's Operalia in Guadalajara, Mexico, in 2016.

Volkov made his debut at the Berlin State Opera in 2019 as Don Antonio in Prokofiev's Betrothal in a Monastery, conducted by Daniel Barenboim, and was a member of its ensemble in 2022 and 2023. He made his debut at the Vienna State Opera in 2020 as Lensky in Tchaikovsky's Eugene Onegin, where he has since appeared regularly.

Among his notable roles is Prince Guidon in Rimsky-Korsakov's The Tale of Tsar Saltan, in Dmitri Tcherniakov's staging first presented at La Monnaie in Brussels in 2019 and later at the Opéra national du Rhin in Strasbourg and the Teatro Real in Madrid. In 2020 he sang Ferrando in Christof Loy's staging of Così fan tutte at the centenary Salzburg Festival, and he has also performed at La Scala in Milan and the Royal Opera House in London. In the United States, Volkov first appeared at the Metropolitan Opera in 2018 as Tybalt in Gounod's Roméo et Juliette, followed by Don Ottavio in Don Giovanni at Palm Beach Opera and Tamino in Die Zauberflöte at Los Angeles Opera in 2019. In 2023 he sang Fenton in Verdi's Falstaff at the Metropolitan Opera, in Robert Carsen's production.

In the summer of 2024, Volkov sang Prince Myshkin in the premiere of Weinberg's The Idiot, directed by Krzysztof Warlikowski, at the Salzburg Festival. For the role he was nominated for the Austrian Music Theatre Prize, named Discovery of the Year, and awarded Best Vocal Performance (Leading Role) by Der Opernfreund. In 2025 he was named Singer of the Year by Opernwelt and nominated for the International Opera Awards in the Readers' Award category.

In January 2026, Volkov made his debut at the Paris Opera as Lensky in Eugene Onegin, in a new production directed by Ralph Fiennes and conducted by Semyon Bychkov.

That same year, he obtained Austrian citizenship. He is based in Vienna.
