= Ashraf Johaardien =

- Born: 15 June 1974 (age 52); Cape Town, South Africa
- Education: United World College of the Atlantic
- Occupations: Playwright, actor, Producer
- Spouse: Pieter Jacobs
- Writing career
- Genre: Drama
- Notable works: Salaam Stories; Happy Endings Are Extra

Ashraf Johaardien (born 1974) is a South African playwright, actor, and producer. He was the recipient of the inaugural PANSA Jury Award (2002), was listed as one of Mail & Guardian's 'Top 200 Young South Africans' (2008) and he received a Legends Award (2012) for his achievements in arts and culture.

== Biography ==
He was born in Cape Town in 1974 and was schooled in South Africa and the UK. He holds an International Baccalaureate from United World College of the Atlantic in Wales, a Bachelor of Arts Degree and an English Honors Degree from the University of Cape Town, a Postgraduate Diploma in Leadership from the University of Johannesburg and a Research master's degree from the University of the Witwatersrand.

His career in the arts encompasses professional and creative roles across a spectrum of disciplines. He has held senior management and leadership positions with key South African cultural and academic organisations (Iziko Museums of Cape Town, Baxter Theatre: University of Cape Town, Film & Publications Board, Centre for the Book: National Library, Arts & Culture Trust, Wits Theatre: University of the Witwatersrand, UJ Arts & Culture: University of Johannesburg). He was the Executive Producer of the National Arts Festival and the Cape Town Fringe, from July 2016 to February 2019.

His plays include Coloured Son X, Salaam Stories/SALAAM, Happy Endings Are Extra, STRIPPED, Miracle*, Ecce Homo! adapted from Tim Miller's Body Blows and The Quiet Violence of Dreams based on the novel by K. Sello Duiker. His work has been performed and produced at mainstream theatres and festivals in South Africa, Ireland, the UK, the Netherlands and the USA. He has been published by Compress, Just Done Productions Publishing, Oxford University Press, Waverly Books (Glasgow) and Umuzi (Random House). He is also the author of The Perfumed Closet, a monthly gay column published in The Pink Tongue (Independent Newspapers) and he went on to compile a collection of queer South African writing entitled "Yes, I am!" with Robin Malan.

He played the title role in the film Sando to Samantha (Cape Town, Johannesburg, New York, Toronto, Paris, San Francisco, Chicago, Turin, Adelaide, Bologna, Brussels, Melbourne and Lisbon) directed by Jack Lewis. Television credits include the role of Lucas in season 4 of the SABC 3 drama series Hard Copy produced by Quizzical Pictures. He originated the role of Boy in the devised play SUIP! as part of a student ensemble at the University of Cape Town (1993). He performed the role of Lawrence with two different casts in the South African and Irish productions of The Myth of Andrew and Jo by Gideon van Eeden (2010). He also originated the solo Hamlet of iHAMLET which was adapted specifically for him to perform by Robin Malan (2012).

== Plays and publications ==
=== Coloured Son X ===
- Baxter Theatre Centre, CT, SA (1998)
- Circle East Theatre Company, NY, USA (2001)
- Published by Compress ISBN 1919833064 ISBN 978-1-919833-06-4

=== Salaam Stories/SALAAM ===
- Spier/PANSA Festival of New Writing (2002)
- Theatre Row, New York City (2002)
- Spier Summer Arts Festival (2003)
- University of the Western Cape (2003)
- Baxter Theatre Centre (2003 & 2004)
- Darling Festival (2004)
- Oval House Theatre, London (2006)
- Grahamstown National Arts Festival (2006)
- South African National Schools Festival (2006)
- The Wits Theatre 969 Festival (2006)
- State Theatre (2006)
- Artscape Theatre Centre (2006)
- Montecasino (2008)
- Baxter Theatre Centre(2008)
- Afrovibes (Netherlands 2008)
- Drama for Life SA Season (2012)
- SA Schools Festivals (Bloemfontein & Mmpumalanga 2012)
- National Arts Festival, Grahamstown (2014)
- Athenaeum, Port Elizabeth (2014)
- Published by Just Done Productions Publishing ISBN 1-920169-26-1 ISBN 978-1-920169-26-8
- Published by Oxford University Press ISBN 978-0-19-576799-5

=== Happy Endings Are Extra ===
- Baxter Theatre Centre (2003)
- Grahamstown National Arts Festival (2004)
- Standard Bank National Arts Festival (2004)
- Artscape Theatre Centre (2005)
- Dublin International Gay Theatre Festival (2006)
- Diversionary Theatre, San Diego CA (2007)
- Bailiwick Rep Theatre, Chicago IL (2007)
- TheatreOut, Santa Ana, Ca (2009)
- Published by Just Done Productions Publishing ISBN 1-920169-24-5 ISBN 978-1-920169-24-4

=== Miracle* ===
- Commissioned by the Glasgow Arts Council
- Published in the anthology Freedom Spring by Waverley Books (Glasgow) ISBN 1902407334

=== STRIPPED ===
- Baxter Theatre Centre (2005)

=== Yes, I Am!: Writing by South African gay men ===
- Compiled by Robin Malan and Ashraf Johaardien (2010)
- Published by Junkets Publishers ISBN 9780620458283

== Adaptations ==
=== Ecce Homo! ===
- Adapted from Body Blows: Six Perforformances by Tim Miller
- Grahamstown National Arts Festival (2006)
- The Wits Theatre 969 Festival (2006)

=== The Quiet Violence of Dreams ===
Based on the novel by K. Sello Duiker

- Grahamstown National Arts Festival (2008)
- South African National Schools Festival (2008)
- Artscape Theatre (2010)
- Walsh Black Box Theatre, Washington D.C. (2010)
- University of Johannesburg Con Cowan Theatre (2011)
