= Brett Goldin =

South African actor and comedian (1977 - 2006)

- Born: 21 October 1977
- Died: 16 April 2006 (aged 28); Cape Town, South Africa
- Education: King David School; Crawford College, Sandton; University of Cape Town
- Occupation: Actor
- Parent(s): Peter and Denise Goldin

Brett Goldin (21 October 1977 – 16 April 2006) was a South African actor and part of the Crazy Monkey comedy troupe. Goldin was murdered in Cape Town in 2006 alongside friend Richard Bloom, a fashion designer who was a label manager for the Maze clothing company in Cape Town.

== Early life ==
Goldin was the son of Peter and Denise Goldin and had one sibling, his sister Samantha.

He was educated at the King David School in Victory Park, Johannesburg and at Crawford College, Sandton. He was a student of the University of Cape Town Drama Department from 1997 to 2000. He graduated with a Bachelor of Arts degree in English and Drama, and subsequently completed a Performer's Diploma in Speech and Drama.

== Career ==
Goldin began performing professionally at the age of eleven and had extensive experience in television, film and theatre.

=== Television ===
Goldin, along with Trevor Clarence, Brendan Jack and Gavin Williams, performed stunts in the popular Crazy Monkey series of comedy inserts aired between music videos by MTV.

He starred in commercials for Pepsi and CNA.

His television acting roles include Terry Schachter in the science fiction drama series Charlie Jade, Michael Krauss in the 2003 television film drama Citizen Verdict, and Dylan in Season 3 of the South African drama series Yizo Yizo.

=== Film ===
Goldin's film roles include Carl in the 2002 horror film Slash, Lourens in the 2003 romantic drama Proteus, and B-Dog in Crazy Monkey's 2005 comedy feature film Straight Outta Benoni.

=== Theatre ===
In 2004 Goldin wrote and acted in his first stage play, a one-man show titled Bad Apple, which examined what would happen if a Columbine-style killing spree were to occur at a wealthy public school in Johannesburg. The production opened in August 2004 at the Intimate Theatre at the University of Cape Town, directed by Matthew Wild. The production received excellent reviews from the local press.

At the time of his death, Goldin was playing the role of Guildenstern in Hamlet at the Baxter Theatre and was set to go to the United Kingdom as part of the South African production to be performed in Stratford-upon-Avon.

== Murder ==
Goldin was murdered alongside a friend, Richard Bloom, in the early hours of Sunday 16 April 2006. They were killed with two shots each to the back of the head in Mowbray, Cape Town, after they had left a party in Camps Bay. They had been hijacked and shot execution-style.

Police and family members were alerted that the men were missing after police patrolling Camps Bay in the early hours of Sunday morning stopped a car being driven recklessly and suspiciously and found Goldin's credit card in the possession of men in the vehicle. The men were questioned by the police and eventually pointed out the location of the bodies of the deceased.

Reportedly found naked except for their socks in the veld next to the M5 freeway early on Monday 17 April 2006, some media coverage of the murders was deemed "particularly disturbing and highly insensitive". Both men killed were gay, and members of the local gay community were traumatised by their violent deaths.

Eleven suspects were initially arrested for the murders. In May 2007, 25-year-old Shavaan Marlie and 23-year-old Clinton Davids pleaded guilty to the murders of Goldin and Bloom and several other related charges. Marlie and Davids received an effective 28-year prison sentence each in terms of a plea bargain agreement. Four other men had been sentenced for related charges the previous year in terms of plea bargain agreements requiring them to testify against Marlie and Davids.

=== Television documentaries ===
In 2007 Antony Sher presented a Channel 4 crime documentary directed by Jon Blair about the murders, titled Murder Most Foul.

In July 2012, the murders were covered in the first episode of the M-Net Crimes Uncovered crime docu-drama television series titled When Two Worlds Collide: The Brett Goldin and Richard Bloom Story.

=== Brett Goldin Bursary Fund ===
Shortly after Goldin's murder, the Baxter Theatre Centre in Cape Town, the Royal Shakespeare Company and the Actors Centre in Johannesburg founded the Brett Goldin Bursary Fund in his memory.

== Filmography ==
=== Film ===
- Slash (2002), Carl
- Proteus (2003), Lourens
- Adrenaline (2003), Eddy
- Blast (2004), Brett
- Straight Outta Benoni (2005), Brett "B-Dog"
- Racing Stripes (2005), Ticket Vendor

=== Television ===
- Cavegirl: Pigball (2002), Pigball Star Player
- Citizen Verdict (2003), Michael Krauss
- The Rose Gardener (2004), Hotel Manager
- Yizo Yizo (2004), Dylan
- Fela's TV (2004)
- Charlie Jade: Identity (2005), Terry Schachter
- Charlie Jade: Flesh (2005), Scrawny Bouncer
