= Jochen Kupfer =

German operatic baritone (born 1969)

Jochen Kupfer (born 1969 in Grimma) is a German operatic baritone.

== Early life and education ==
Kupfer received regular singing lessons from the age of 10, and studied singing with Helga Forner at the Musikhochschule Leipzig. He attended master classes with the likes of Aldo Baldin, Theo Adam and Elio Battaglia, and was taught by Dietrich Fischer-Dieskau and Elisabeth Schwarzkopf.

== Career ==
During his studies he was engaged at the Meiningen State Theatre, where he sang such roles as Wolfram von Eschenbach in Richard Wagner's opera Tannhäuser. From 1997 to 2005 he was an ensemble member at the Staatsoper Dresden, and sang roles such as Count Almaviva in Le nozze di Figaro, Papageno in Die Zauberflöte, Guglielmo in Cosi fan tutte and Olivier in Capriccio. In 2003, The Gramophone mentioned his "beautiful singing" and "gifts as a Lieder interpreter". Kupfer had guest engagements among others at the Staatsoper Unter den Linden (as Olivier) and the Bavarian State Opera (as Guglielmo). In the 2012/13 season, among others, he performed in Tristan und Isolde.

Kupfer has worked with conductors such as Giuseppe Sinopoli, Hartmut Haenchen, René Jacobs, Philippe Herreweghe, Marc Soustrot, Jeffrey Tate, Peter Schreier, Helmuth Rilling and Trevor Pinnock, and has sung in concerts in San Francisco, Los Angeles and in New York's prestigious Carnegie Hall. He guested at various international festivals, such as the Nuits Romantiques in Aix-les-Bains, at the Salzburg Festival, the Festival International de Musique et d'Art Lyrique and at the Festival of Early Music in Boston. He is the winner of the Mozart Festival Competition in Würzburg, the International Johann Sebastian Bach Competition in Leipzig, the Mendelssohn Competition in Berlin and numerous others.
