= Werner Haseleu =

German opera singer (1935–2012)

- Born: 2 May 1935; Wittenberg, Germany
- Died: 29 June 2012 (aged 77)
- Occupations: Operatic bass-baritone; Academic teacher
- Organizations: Staatsoper Dresden; Komische Oper Berlin; Musikhochschule Weimar; Musikhochschule Dresden

Werner Haseleu (2 May 1935 – 29 June 2012) was a German operatic bass-baritone and academic voice teacher. He was a long-term member of the Staatsoper Dresden and the Komische Oper Berlin, often with director Harry Kupfer at both houses. He was known for leading roles in world premieres and contemporary opera.

== Life and career ==
Haseleu was born in Wittenberg and trained in Leipzig. He debuted in 1958 at the Nationaltheater Weimar, and worked there until 1973. He appeared there as Leporello in Mozart's Don Giovanni, Don Alfonso in Così fan tutte, King Philipp in Verdi's Don Carlos, the title role of Falstaff and as Ochs in Der Rosenkavalier by Richard Strauss, among others.

In 1973 he moved to the Staatsoper Dresden. On 21 April 1974, he took part in the world premiere of Rainer Kunad's Sabellicus at the Berlin State Opera. In Dresden he also sang the title role in Bartók's Bluebeard's Castle and as Moses in Schoenberg's Moses und Aron, directed by Harry Kupfer. He sang leading roles in the world premieres of Udo Zimmermann's Der Schuhu und die fliegende Prinzessin on 30 December 1976 and Kunad's Vincent on 22 February 1979 in Dresden. In 1983, he performed the title role in Aribert Reimann's Lear at the Komische Oper Berlin. He moved to the opera house in 1984 together with Kupfer. Haseleu appeared as Holofernes in the world premiere of Judith by Siegfried Matthus on 28 September 1985 at Berlin State Opera. In 1988, he performed as Leporello in Alexander Dargomyzhsky's The Stone Guest at the Komische Oper. In 1998, he took part there in Henze's König Hirsch.

Haseleu was also a guest at the operas of Leningrad, Prague, at the Internationale Maifestspiele Wiesbaden and in Lausanne. He was also active in the pedagogical sector: He taught from 1961 to 1973 at the Musikhochschule Weimar and from 1973 at the Hochschule für Musik Dresden.

Haseleu died June 2012 at the age of 77 years and was buried at the Heidefriedhof in Dresden.

== Recordings ==
Haseleu's voice is preserved on recordings of Die schweigsame Frau by Richard Strauss, Moses und Aron, Udo Zimmermann's Levins Mühle, scenes from Lear and Judith, and Der Rosenkavalier. Judith was recorded and broadcast by the Deutscher Fernsehfunk.
