= Diana Haller =

Croatian mezzo-soprano (born 1986)

- Born: 11 November 1986 (age 39); Rijeka, Croatia
- Occupations: Opera and classical singer (mezzo-soprano)
- Years active: 2009–present
- Website: dianahaller.com

Diana Haller (born 11 November 1986) is a Croatian mezzo-soprano and active in opera, oratorio, and recital. She was named "Nachwuchssängerin des Jahres 2013" (Young singer of the year 2013) by the magazine Opernwelt.

Haller was born in Rijeka (Croatia), in a family of Croatian and Italian background. She grew up in an artistic family being a great-granddaughter of the pianist Emilia Haller, granddaughter of the painter Antun Haller, and nephew of the musicians Roberto Haller and his wife Ingrid Haller.
