= Helga Forner =

Helga Forner (1936 – 3 December 2004) was a professor of singing at the University of Music and Theatre Leipzig. She was one of the best-known German singing teachers before and after the Peaceful Revolution.

== Career ==
Forner was born in Berlin. From 1954 to 1960 she studied singing at the Hochschule für Musik Leipzig, among others with Eva Fleischer. Afterwards, she taught singing at the Halle Conservatory for five years. In 1965 she received a teaching assignment at her former training centre in Leipzig. In 1978, after three rejections (for political reasons), she was appointed a lecturer for singing. In 1987 she received an extraordinary professorship and five years later she was appointed full professor of singing.

Forner was nominated emeritus in 2001, but held a teaching position until 2004.

The vocal teacher, who conducted master classes in Germany and Europe, trained a large number of singers, including Eva-Maria Bundschuh, Simone Kermes, Romelia Lichtenstein, Jochen Kupfer, and Thomas Wittig.

Forner died in Leipzig.
