= Rolf Reuter =

German conductor

Rolf Reuter (7 October 1926 – 10 September 2007) was a German conductor.

== Life ==
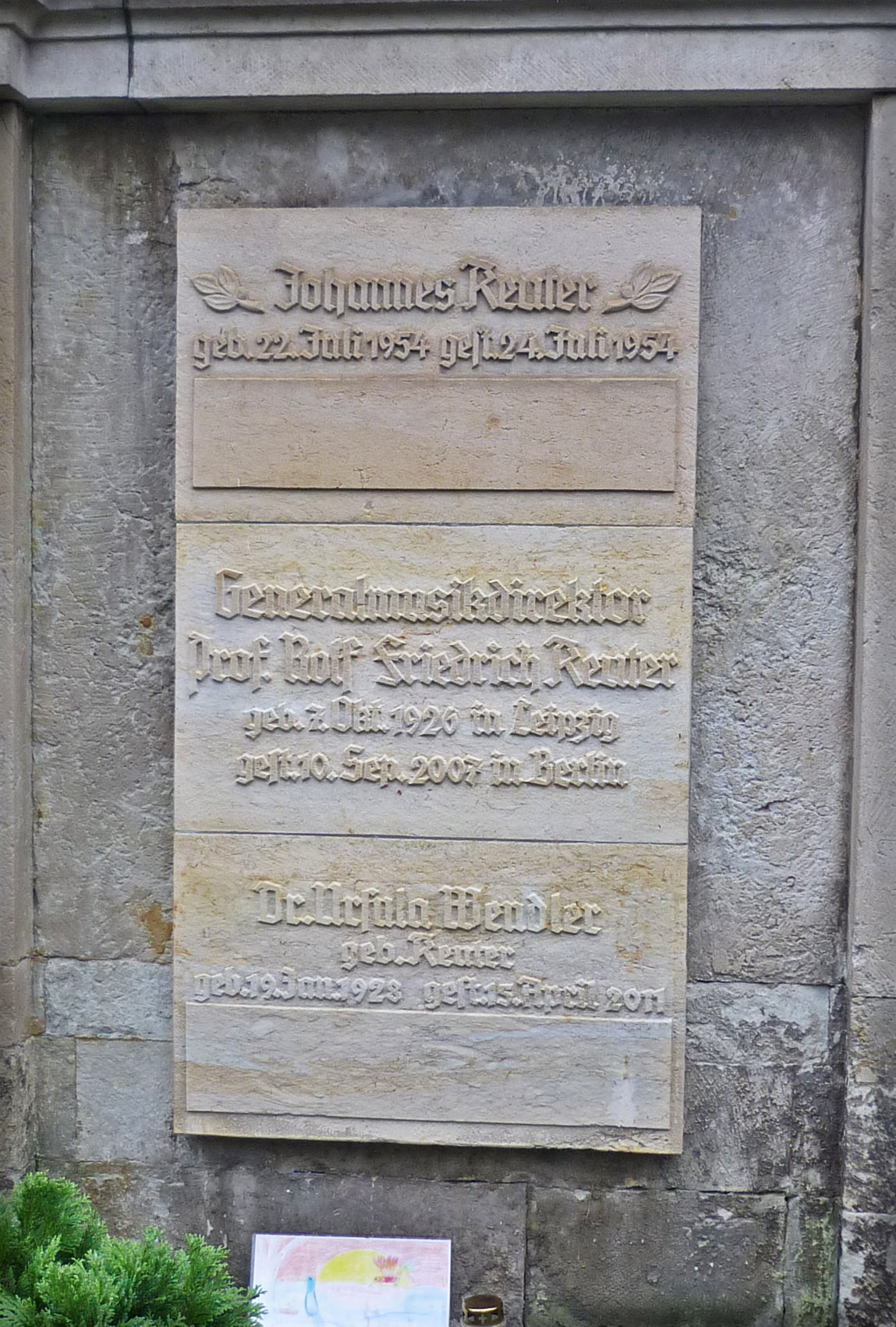
Grave of Prof. Rolf Reuter on the Inner Plauenschen Cemetery in Dresden

Reuter was born as the son of the composer Fritz Reuter in Leipzig. After studying music at the Hochschule für Musik Carl Maria von Weber Dresden he began his career in 1951 as Kapellmeister at the theatre in Eisenach. In 1956 he moved to Meiningen, from there Reuter went to Oper Leipzig as general music director in 1961. From 1978 to 1980 he was chief conductor of the Deutsches Nationaltheater und Staatskapelle Weimar. From 1981 Reuter was General music director of the Komische Oper Berlin, where he remained until 1993. His numerous guest performances and master classes have taken him around the world, including Paris, London, Tokyo, Beijing, Houston and Buenos Aires, as well as Israel, Italy, France, Spain, the former Soviet Union, Bulgaria, etc.

His conducting, partly in collaboration with Harry Kupfer, for example the Mozart cycle, Wagner's Die Meistersinger von Nürnberg, Boris Godunov, and the world premiere of Siegfried Matthus' opera Judith, significantly shaped the artistic profile of the Komische Oper Berlin. Among the most important artists with whom he performed are David Oistrach, Jessye Norman, David Geringas, Alfredo Kraus, Anna Tomowa-Sintow, Christa Ludwig, Peter Seiffert, Kiri Te Kanawa, Theo Adam and many more.

Since 1966 Reuter had also been director of conducting at the University of Music and Theatre Leipzig in addition to his conducting activities. He was president of the Hans Pfitzner Society and honorary professor at the Hochschule für Musik "Hanns Eisler" in Berlin. World-famous conductors emerged from his teaching, for example Vladimir Jurowski, Walter Taieb, Thomaskantor Georg Christoph Biller, Claus Peter Flor as well as Shi-Yeon Sung.

Reuter died in Berlin at age 80. His grave is located at the Innerer Plauenscher Friedhof in Dresden. The violist Sophia Reuter is his daughter.

== Honours and critic ==
Reuter was an honorary member of the Komische Oper Berlin and the Leipziger Opera. In 2000 he was awarded the Bundesverdienstkreuz. He was awarded the National Prize and the Patriotic Order of Merit of the GDR as well as the Franz Liszt Prize of the Republic of Hungary.

Shortly before his death the conductor got into public criticism, because he opened on 13 May 2006 together with Lisbeth Grolitsch a "Singleiterkurs" of the Freundeskreis Ulrich von Hutten and held on this occasion two lectures with the titles Das deutsche Volkslied als Mutterboden der Hochkultur (The German folk song as the breeding ground of high culture) and Anton Bruckner und die deutsche Volksseele (Anton Bruckner and the German People's Soul) in front of the neo-fascist organization.

Reuter did not deny having given these lectures, nor the personal contact to this organization. In response to strong public pressure and numerous reports in the German press, he expressly dissociated himself from the ideas of these and all other right-wing and left-wing radical organizations. The Bundespräsidialamt did not grant a demand by the member of the Abgeordnetenhaus of Berlin, the SPD politician Tom Schreiber, to deprive the conductor of the Federal Cross of Merit awarded in 2000.

Prominent pupils, such as Vladimir Jurowski in the Leipziger Volkszeitung, stressed that his teaching had taken place in a humanist spirit. Reuters last students at Hochschule für Musik "Hanns Eisler" Berlin joined a public statement that his teaching was cosmopolitan, tolerant and humane. Many of his colleagues, friends and confidants from politics and culture stood up for him in the press and intervened at the Office of the Federal President against Tom Schreiber's request to withdraw the Federal Cross of Merit.

== Recordings ==
- Handel: L'Allegro, il Penseroso ed il Moderato. Oratorium HWV 5 by Berlin Classics Edel Records
- Beethoven: Musik zu Goethes Trauerspiel Egmont, Op. 84, by Eterna (820 737, MONO), with the Leipzig Gewandhaus Orchestra
- H. Pfitzner: Das Herz (opera) by Marco Polo
- H. Pfitzner: Das dunkle Reich – Der Blumen Rache
- H. Berlioz: Symphonie fantastique
- H. Berlioz: Lelio oder Die Rückkehr ins Leben, Op. 14b by Berlin Classics Edel Records
- S. Matthus: Judith (opera) by Berlin Classics Edel Records
- Klassik in Weimar (Festliche Weihnachtskonzerte). Works by Corelli, Telemann, Tartini among others.
- Klassik in Weimar (Serenade im Park). Works by W. A. Mozart
