= Opernwelt =

German opera magazine

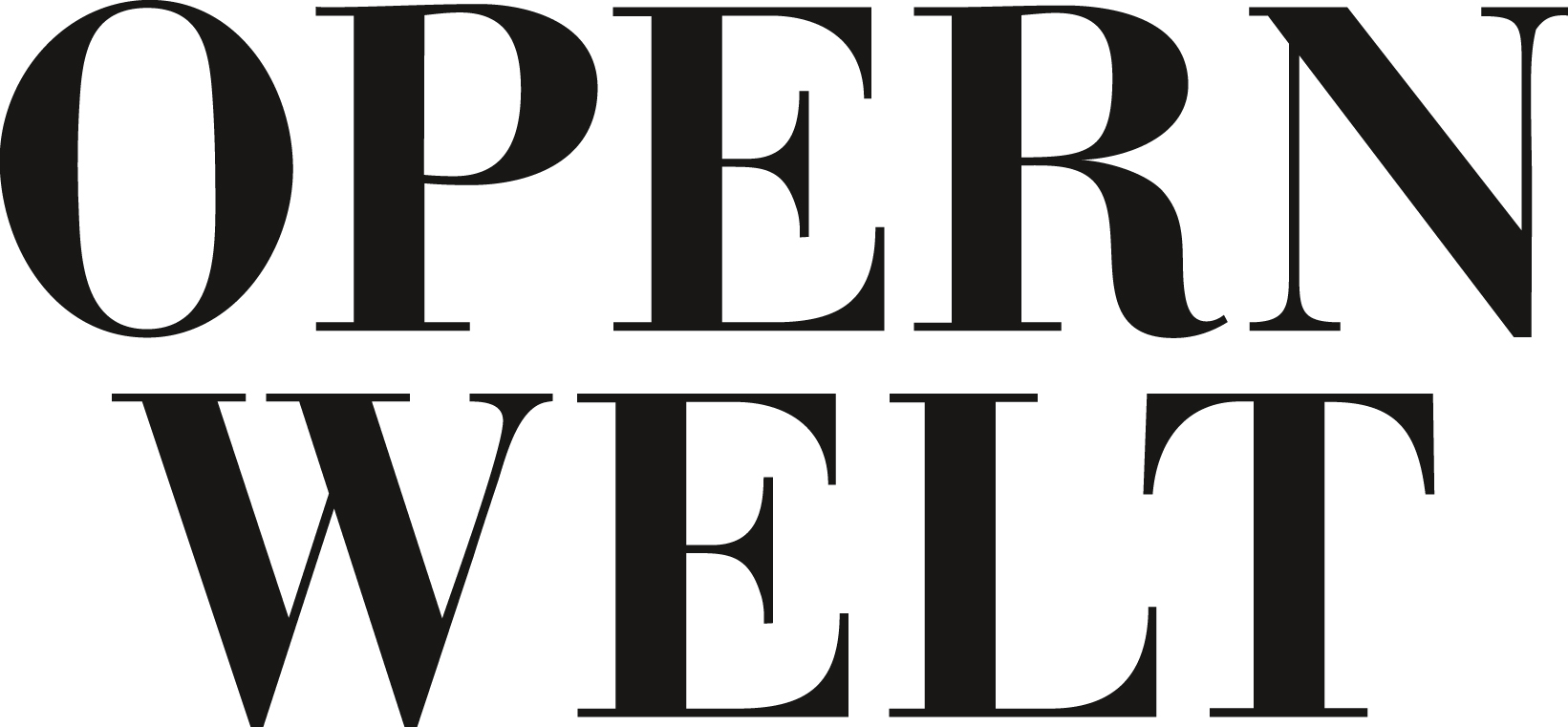
- Magazine logo
- Categories: Opera
- Frequency: Monthly
- Circulation: 10,000; Reach: 20,000
- First issue: 1960
- Company: Friedrich Berlin Verlag; Klett Gruppe
- Country: Germany
- Based in: Berlin
- Language: German
- Website: www.der-theaterverlag.de/opernwelt
- ISSN: 0030-3690

Opernwelt ('opera world') is a monthly German magazine for opera, operetta and ballet. It includes news about current performances, portraits of composers and performers, articles about opera houses, performance spaces, and contemporary and historical subjects from the world of opera and classical music. It reviews recordings and books and publishes monthly schedules of German and international opera houses. The magazine's website offers full text search for past issues. A year book is published every October.

== Awards ==
Each year since 1994, at the end of the season, the magazine sponsors a jury of 50 critics to select the best in several categories:

- opera house of the year (Opernhaus des Jahres)
- staging of the year (Aufführung des Jahres)
- stage director of the year (Regisseur/Regisseurin des Jahres)
- singer of the year (Sänger/Sängerin des Jahres)
- stage- and costume designer of the year (Kostüm- und Bühnenbildner/Bühnenbilderin des Jahres)
- conductor of the year (Dirigent/Dirigentin des Jahres)
- orchestra of the year (Orchester des Jahres)
- premiere of the year (Uraufführung des Jahres)

They are usually selected from German-speaking countries, Austria, Germany and German-speaking Switzerland. In 2011, La Monnaie received the accolade, the first time it has been given to a non-German speaking house.

=== Opera house of the year ===
Year	Opera house
1993	Leipzig Opera
1994	Staatsoper Stuttgart
1995	Oper Frankfurt
1996	Oper Frankfurt
1997	Hamburg State Opera
1998	Staatsoper Stuttgart
1999	Staatsoper Stuttgart
2000	Staatsoper Stuttgart
2001	Graz Opera
2002	Staatsoper Stuttgart
2003	Oper Frankfurt
2004	Die deutschen Stadttheater (the German municipal theatres, collectively)
2005	Hamburg State Opera
2006	Staatsoper Stuttgart
2007	Oper Bremen and Komische Oper Berlin
2008	Aalto Theatre, Essen
2009	Theater Basel
2010	Theater Basel
2011	La Monnaie, Brussels
2012	Cologne Opera
2013	Komische Oper Berlin
2014	Bayerische Staatsoper, Munich
2015	National Theatre Mannheim and Oper Frankfurt
2016	Staatsoper Stuttgart
2017	Opéra de Lyon
2018	Oper Frankfurt
2019	Opéra national du Rhin, Alsace
2020	Oper Frankfurt, Grand Théâtre de Genève
2021	–
2022	Oper Frankfurt
2023	Oper Frankfurt
2024	Oper Frankfurt
2025	Zurich Opera House
2026	Staatstheater Mainz

=== Choir of the year ===
- 1998/1999: Stuttgarter Staatsopernchor
- 1999/2000: Stuttgarter Staatsopernchor
- 2000/2001: Stuttgarter Staatsopernchor
- 2001/2002. Stuttgarter Staatsopernchor
- 2002/2003: Stuttgarter Staatsopernchor
- 2003/2004: Staatsopernchor Hannover
- 2004/2005. Stuttgarter Staatsopernchor
- 2005/2006: Stuttgarter Staatsopernchor
- 2006/2007: Chor der Komischen Oper Berlin
- 2007/2008: Chor der Deutschen Oper Berlin
- 2008/2009: Chor der Deutschen Oper Berlin
- 2009/2010: Chor der Deutschen Oper Berlin
- 2010/2011: Stuttgarter Staatsopernchor
- 2011/2012: Stuttgarter Staatsopernchor
- 2012/2013: Chor des Theaters Basel
- 2013/2014: Chor des Nationaltheaters Mannheim
- 2014/2015: Chor der Komischen Oper Berlin
- 2015/2016: Chor der Nationale Opera in Amsterdam
- 2016/2017: Chor der Staatsoper Stuttgart
- 2017/2018: Chor der Staatsoper Stuttgart
- 2018/2019: Chor der Staatsoper Stuttgart
- 2019/2020: Chor der Staatsoper Stuttgart
- 2020/2021: –
- 2021/2022: Chor der Oper Frankfurt
- 2022/2023: Chor der Oper Frankfurt
- 2023/2024: Chor der Oper Frankfurt
- 2024/2025: Chor der Komischen Oper Berlin
- 2025/2026: Chor des Nationale Opera en Ballet Amsterdam

=== Orchestra of the year ===
- 1998/1999: Berliner Philharmoniker
- 1999/2000: Staatskapelle Berlin
- 2000/2001: Philharmonia Zurich
- 2001/2002: Staatsorchester Stuttgart
- 2002/2003: Essener Philharmonie
- 2003/2004: Staatskapelle Berlin
- 2004/2005: Staatskapelle Berlin
- 2005/2006: Staatskapelle Berlin
- 2006/2007: Freiburger Barockorchester
- 2007/2008: Essener Philharmonie and Staatskapelle Berlin
- 2008/2009: Frankfurter Opern- und Museumsorchester
- 2009/2010: Frankfurter Opern- und Museumsorchester
- 2010/2011: Frankfurter Opern- und Museumsorchester
- 2011/2012: Bayerisches Staatsorchester
- 2012/2013: Staatskapelle Dresden
- 2013/2014: Bayerisches Staatsorchester
- 2014/2015: Bayerisches Staatsorchester
- 2015/2016: Bayerisches Staatsorchester
- 2016/2017: Bayerisches Staatsorchester
- 2017/2018: Bayerisches Staatsorchester
- 2018/2019: Bayerisches Staatsorchester
- 2019/2020: Bayerisches Staatsorchester
- 2020/2021: –
- 2021/2022: Bayerisches Staatsorchester
- 2022/2023: Bayerisches Staatsorchester
- 2023/2024: Bayerisches Staatsorchester, Frankfurter Opern- und Museumsorchester
- 2024/2025: Meiningen Court Orchestra, Frankfurter Opern- und Museumsorchester, Bayerische Staatsorchester
- 2025/2026: Frankfurter Opern- und Museumsorchester

=== Singer of the year ===
- 1995/1996: Hanna Schwarz, Edita Gruberová, Matti Salminen
- 1996/1997: Edita Gruberová, Hildegard Behrens, Luana DeVol, Alan Titus
- 1997/1998: Gabriele Schnaut, David Daniels, Ian Bostridge
- 1998/1999: Angela Denoke, Peter Seiffert
- 1999/2000: Luana DeVol
- 2000/2001: Susan Graham, Jacek Strauch
- 2001/2002: Anne Schwanewilms, Gabriel Sadé
- 2002/2003: Anna Netrebko, Jacek Laszczkowski
- 2003/2004: Marlis Petersen
- 2004/2005: Nina Stemme, Rolando Villazón
- 2005/2006: Catherine Naglestad, René Pape
- 2006/2007: Christine Schäfer
- 2007/2008: Diana Damrau, Michael Volle
- 2008/2009: Anja Harteros, Jonas Kaufmann
- 2009/2010: Marlis Petersen, Christian Gerhaher
- 2010/2011: Johannes Martin Kränzle
- 2011/2012: Nina Stemme
- 2012/2013: Barbara Hannigan
- 2013/2014: Michael Volle
- 2014/2015: Georg Nigl, Marlis Petersen
- 2015/2016: Christian Gerhaher
- 2016/2017: Anja Harteros, Matthias Klink
- 2017/2018: Johannes Martin Kränzle
- 2018/2019: Asmik Grigorian
- 2019/2020: Marlis Petersen, Jakub Józef Orliński
- 2020/2021: –
- 2021/2022: Vera-Lotte Boecker
- 2022/2023: Michael Volle
- 2023/2024: Asmik Grigorian, John Osborn
- 2024/2025: Eleonora Buratto, Bogdan Volkov
- 2025/2026: Elena Stikhina, Michael Spyres

=== Conductor of the year ===
- 1995/1996: Michael Gielen
- 1996/1997: Lothar Zagrosek
- 1997/1998: Ingo Metzmacher
- 1998/1999: Lothar Zagrosek
- 1999/2000: Claudio Abbado
- 2000/2001: Sylvain Cambreling
- 2001/2002: Ádám Fischer
- 2002/2003: Sebastian Weigle
- 2003/2004: William Christie
- 2004/2005: Pierre Boulez
- 2005/2006: Simone Young
- 2006/2007: Kirill Petrenko
- 2007/2008: Claudio Abbado
- 2008/2009: Kirill Petrenko
- 2009/2010: Ingo Metzmacher
- 2010/2011: Mariss Jansons
- 2011/2012: Christian Thielemann
- 2012/2013: Lothar Zagrosek
- 2013/2014: Kirill Petrenko
- 2014/2015: Kirill Petrenko
- 2015/2016: Teodor Currentzis
- 2016/2017: Hartmut Haenchen
- 2017/2018: John Eliot Gardiner
- 2018/2019: Joana Mallwitz
- 2019/2020: Kirill Petrenko, Titus Engel
- 2020/2021: –
- 2021/2022: Kirill Petrenko
- 2022/2023: Kirill Petrenko
- 2023/2024: Pablo Heras-Casado
- 2024/2025: Kirill Petrenko
- 2025/2026: Thomas Guggeis

=== Stage director of the year ===
- 1996/1997: Herbert Wernicke
- 1997/1998: Peter Konwitschny
- 1998/1999: Peter Konwitschny
- 1999/2000: Peter Konwitschny
- 2000/2001: Peter Konwitschny
- 2001/2002: Sergio Morabito and Jossi Wieler
- 2002/2003: Christof Loy
- 2003/2004: Christof Loy
- 2004/2005: Hans Neuenfels
- 2005/2006: Sebastian Baumgarten
- 2006/2007: Stefan Herheim
- 2007/2008: Christof Loy und Hans Neuenfels
- 2008/2009: Stefan Herheim
- 2009/2010: Stefan Herheim
- 2010/2011: Achim Freyer
- 2011/2012: Sergio Morabito and Jossi Wieler
- 2012/2013: Tatjana Gürbaca
- 2013/2014: Romeo Castellucci
- 2014/2015: Hans Neuenfels
- 2015/2016: Barrie Kosky
- 2016/2017: Dmitri Tcherniakov
- 2017/2018: Peter Konwitschny
- 2018/2019: Romeo Castellucci
- 2019/2020: Tobias Kratzer
- 2020/2021: –
- 2021/2022: Kirill Serebrennikov
- 2022/2023: Dmitri Tcherniakov
- 2023/2024: Lydia Steier for Verdi's Aida in Frankfurt
- 2024/2025: Tobias Kratzer
- 2025/2026: Claus Guth

=== Staging of the year ===
- 1995/1996: Xerxes by Georg Friedrich Händel at the Bayerische Staatsoper
- 1996/1997: Das Mädchen mit den Schwefelhölzern by Helmut Lachenmann at the Staatsoper Hannover
- 1997/1998: Die Entführung aus dem Serail by Wolfgang Amadeus Mozart at the Staatsoper Stuttgart
- 1998/1999: Káťa Kabanová by Leoš Janáček at the Salzburger Festspiele
- 1999/2000: Götterdämmerung by Richard Wagner at the Staatsoper Stuttgart
- 2000/2001: Falstaff by Giuseppe Verdi at the Opernhaus Graz
- 2001/2002: Ariadne auf Naxos by Richard Strauss at the Salzburger Festspiele
- 2002/2003: Rinaldo by Georg Friedrich Händel in Montpellier, Innsbruck und Berlin
- 2003/2004: Al gran sole carico d'amore by Luigi Nono at the Staatsoper Hannover
- 2004/2005: Doktor Faust by Ferruccio Busoni at the Staatsoper Stuttgart
- 2005/2006: Alceste by Christoph Willibald Gluck an der Staatsoper Stuttgart
- 2006/2007: Aus einem Totenhaus by Leoš Janáček bei den Wiener Festwochen
- 2007/2008: Penthesilea by Othmar Schoeck at the Theater Basel
- 2008/2009: Parsifal by Richard Wagner at the Bayreuther Festspiele
- 2009/2010: Macbeth by Giuseppe Verdi at the La Monnaie
- 2010/2011: Les Huguenots by Giacomo Meyerbeer at the La Monnaie
- 2011/2012: La sonnambula by Vincenzo Bellini at the Staatsoper Stuttgart
- 2012/2013: Parsifal by Richard Wagner at the Vlaamse Opera in Antwerpen
- 2013/2014: Die Soldaten by Bernd Alois Zimmermann at the Bayerische Staatsoper Munich
- 2014/2015: Jakob Lenz, Kammeroper by Wolfgang Rihm at the Staatsoper Stuttgart
- 2015/2016: Donnerstag aus Licht by Karlheinz Stockhausen at the Theater Basel
- 2016/2017: Lulu by Alban Berg at the Hamburgische Staatsoper
- 2017/2018: Die Meistersinger von Nürnberg by Richard Wagner at the Bayreuther Festspiele
- 2018/2019: Salome by Richard Strauss at the Salzburger Festspiele
- 2019/2020: Tannhäuser by Richard Wagner at the Bayreuther Festspiele
- 2020/2021: –
- 2021/2022: Die Nacht vor Weihnachten by Nikolai Rimsky-Korsakov at the Oper Frankfurt
- 2022/2023: Krieg und Frieden by Sergei Prokofiev at the Bayerische Staatsoper in Munich
- 2023/2024: Wagner's Tannhäuser by Matthew Wild at the Oper Frankfurt, Schönberg's Moses und Aron by Lorenzo Fiorini in Bonn, Tschaikowsky's Pique Dame by Timofej Kuljabin at the Opéra de Lyon, Weinberg's The Passenger by Tobias Kratzer at the Bayerische Staatsoper, Martinů's The Greek Passion by Simon Stones at the Salzburger Sommerfestspiele
- 2024/2025: Mieczysław Weinberg's Der Idiot at the Salzburger Festspiele
- 2025/2026: –

=== Premiere of the year ===
- 1996/1997: Das Mädchen mit den Schwefelhölzern by Helmut Lachenmann at the Hamburg State Opera
- 1997/1998: Die tödliche Blume by Salvatore Sciarrino at the Schwetzinger Festspiele
- 1998/1999: Schneewittchen by Heinz Holliger at the Opernhaus Zürich
- 1999/2000: Pnima by Chaya Czernowin at the Münchener Biennale
- 2000/2001: Bernarda Albas Haus by Aribert Reimann at the Bayerische Staatsoper Munich
- 2001/2002: Macbeth by Salvatore Sciarrino at the Schwetzinger Festspiele
- 2002/2003: Begehren by Beat Furrer at the Steirischer Herbst in Graz
- 2003/2004: Das Gesicht im Spiegel by Jörg Widmann at the Cuvilliés-Theater Munich
- 2004/2005: iOpal by Hans-Joachim Hespos at the Staatsoper Hannover
- 2005/2006: Ein Atemzug – die Odyssee by Isabel Mundry at the Deutsche Oper Berlin
- 2006/2007: Alice in Wonderland by Unsuk Chin at the Bayerische Staatsoper
- 2007/2008: Phaedra by Hans Werner Henze at the Berliner Staatsoper
- 2008/2009: Proserpina by Wolfgang Rihm bei den Schwetzinger Festspiele, Hamlet by Christian Jost at the Komische Oper Berlin and La porta della legge by Salvatore Sciarrino in Wuppertal
- 2009/2010: Medea by Aribert Reimann at the Wiener Staatsoper
- 2010/2011: Dionysos by Wolfgang Rihm at the Salzburger Festspiele
- 2011/2012: Orest by Manfred Trojahn at the De Nederlandse Opera, Amsterdam
- 2012/2013: Written on Skin by George Benjamin at the Aix-en-Provence Festival and Der Idiot by Mieczysław Weinberg at the Nationaltheater Mannheim
- 2013/2014: Böse Geister by Adriana Hölszky (after Dostoevsky) at the Nationaltheater Mannheim
- 2014/2015: Esame di mezzanotte by Lucia Ronchetti at the Nationaltheater Mannheim
- 2015/2016: Koma by Georg Friedrich Haas for the Schwetzinger Festspiele and the Staatstheater Darmstadt
- 2016/2017: Infinite Now by Chaya Czernowin, coproduction Vlaamse Opera Antwerpen/Gent, Nationaltheater Mannheim and IRCAM, Paris
- 2017/2018: Lunea by Heinz Holliger at the Opernhaus Zürich
- 2018/2019: Fin de partie by György Kurtág at the La Scala
- 2019/2020: Orlando by Olga Neuwirth at the Wiener Staatsoper ex aequo with The Snow Queen by Hans Abrahamsen (Copenhagen and Munich)
- 2020/2021: –
- 2021/2022: Sleepless by Péter Eötvös at the Staatsoper Berlin and Girl with a Pearl Earring by Stefan Wirth at Opernhaus Zürich
- 2022/2023: Blühen by Vito Žuraj at the Oper Frankfurt and La Légende de Tristan by Charles Tournemire at the Theater Ulm
- 2023/2024: Dora by Bernhard Lang at the Staatsoper Stuttgart
- 2024/2025: Le petit pauvre d’Assise by Charles Tournemire at the Theater Ulm
- 2025/2026: Of One Blood by Brett Dean at the Bayerische Staatsoper, Munich

=== Emerging Artist of the Year ===
- 1995/1996: Christine Schäfer
- 1996/1997: Alexandra von der Weth
- 1997/1998: Iride Martinez
- 1998/1999: Nadja Michael, Vivica Genaux
- 1999/2000: Anja Harteros, Stefan Vinke
- 2000/2001: Daniela Denschlag, Francis Pappas, David Walker
- 2001/2002: –
- 2002/2003: –
- 2003/2004: –
- 2004/2005: Pavol Breslik
- 2005/2006: Anna Palimina
- 2006/2007: Andris Nelsons
- 2007/2008: Philippe Jaroussky
- 2008/2009: Christiane Karg
- 2009/2010: Svetlana Ignatovich
- 2010/2011: Julia Lezhneva
- 2011/2012: Ana Durlovski
- 2012/2013: Diana Haller
- 2013/2014: Hanna-Elisabeth Müller
- 2014/2015: Elena Sancho Pereg
- 2015/2016: Elsa Dreisig
- 2016/2017: Demis Volpi
- 2017/2018: Anna El-Khashem
- 2018/2019: Lise Davidsen
- 2019/2020: "Tolle neue Stimmen"
- 2022/2023: Konstantin Krimmel
- 2023/2024: –
- 2024/2025: Anna Nekhames
