= Pieter Jacobs (playwright) =

- Born: 1 January 1980 (age 46); Bloemfontein, Free State, South Africa
- Education: University of Witwatersrand
- Occupations: Head: Arts & Culture University of Johannesburg
- Years active: 2001–present
- Spouse: Ashraf Johaardien (m. 2013)
- Children: 2

Pieter Jacobs (born 1 January 1980) is a South African playwright, actor and arts executive. He was the chief executive officer of The Arts & Culture Trust (ACT) until 2010.

He studied performing arts at Tshwane University of Technology and holds a MA in creative writing from the School of Literature, Language, and Media (SLLMS) at the University of the Witwatersrand, where he graduated cum laude.

He performed in several stage plays as well as the Afrikaans 2003 television drama series, Song vir Katryn and the Hollywood film Stander. He won a KKNK Nagtegaal Debut prize for his play Plofstof in 2003 and his 2008 play, Dalliances was also nominated for an Oscar Wilde Award in Dublin. His latest play, Prey, creates a world where virtual life and reality are intertwined to explore themes of online revenge pornography, racism and blackmail. Prey was selected from 50 submissions for a showcase at the inaugural KKNK Teksmark new play development initiative in 2016.

He was the chairperson of Arterial Network, South Africa, and was also an Ambassador for Assitej's 2017 World Congress and Performing Arts Festival, “Cradle of Creativity". In 2015, the Mail & Guardian included him on their list of the top 200 noteworthy young South Africans.
