= Gabriela Scherer =

Swiss soprano and former mezzo-soprano (born 05 January 1981)

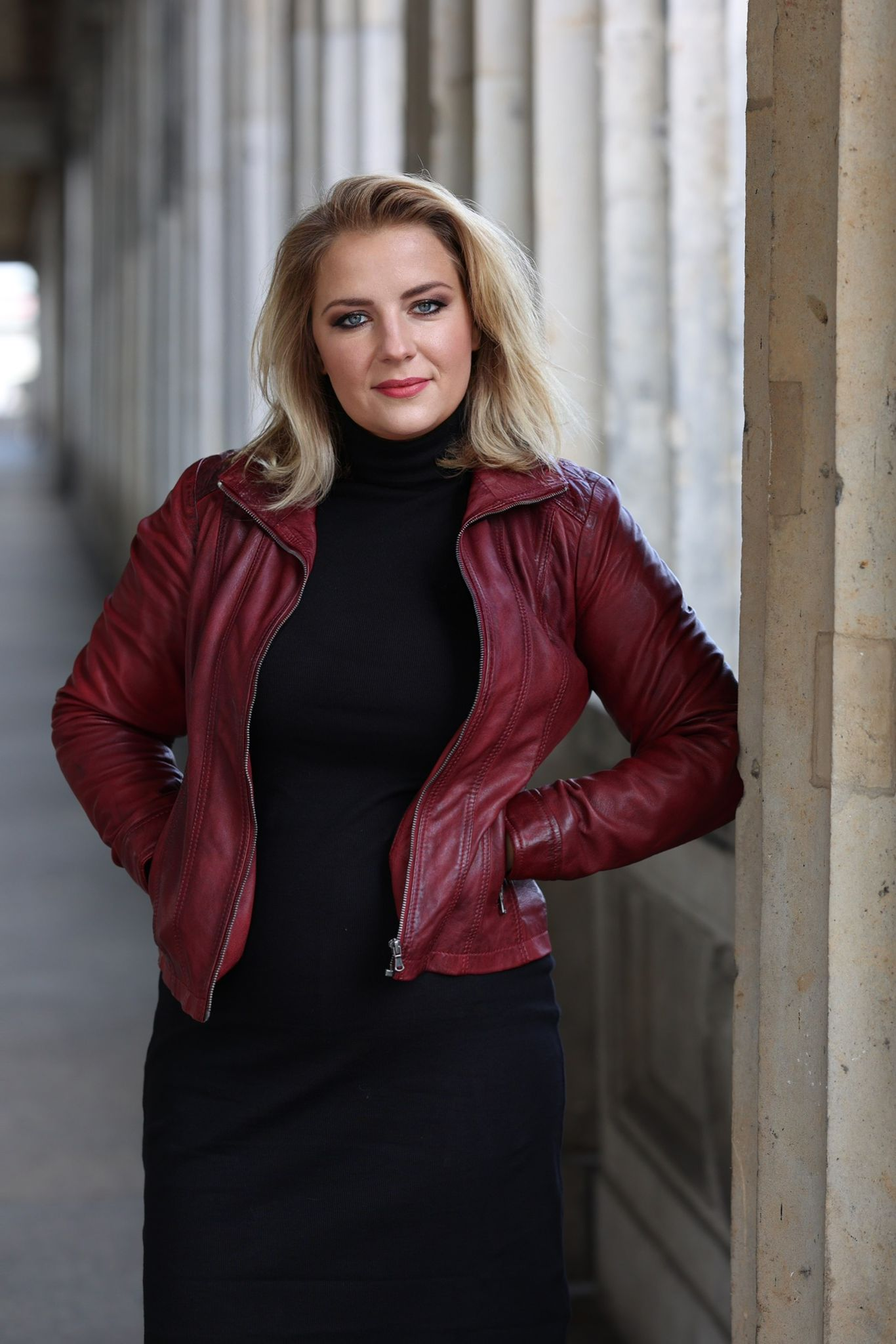
- Soprano Gabriela Scherer in Berlin 2024
- Born: Zurich, Switzerland
- Website: https://gabrielascherer.com

Gabriela Scherer (born January 5, 1981 in Zurich, Switzerland) is a Swiss soprano and former mezzo-soprano.

== Birth and education ==
Gabriela Scherer was born January 5, 1981 in Zurich, Switzerland. She grew up in Switzerland where she was exposed to music at an early age. Having spent many years singing and learning music with the local choir she began her studies with Helen Keller (Smpv) in Zurich.

Between 2002 and 2006, Gabriela continued her studies at the University of Mozarteum Salzburg with Prof. Horiana Branisteanu and Prof. KS Elizabeth Wilke. She attended courses from Prof. Claudia Eder and Denia Mazzola-Gavazzeni (Milan).

== Career ==
As a young mezzo-soprano, Gabriela Scherer was a member of the international Opernstudio in Zurich and later a member of the ensembles of the Leipzig Opera and the Bavarian State Opera in Munich. From 2015, Gabriela Scherer made her debuts in several soprano roles and is now singing some of the most important parts of the German and Italian repertoire. Her repertoire includes operas by Richard Wagner (Elsa in Lohengrin, Senta in Der fliegende Holländer), Richard Strauss (title roles Ariadne auf Naxos and Arabella, Chrysothemis in Elektra), Ludwig van Beethoven (title role Fidelio), Giacomo Puccini (title role Tosca), Giuseppe Verdi (Elisabetta in Don Carlo) and Wolfgang Amadeus Mozart (Contessa in Le nozze di Figaro, Donna Elvira in Don Giovanni). She is regularly performing at theatres such as the Staatsoper Unter den Linden in Berlin, Deutsche Oper Berlin, Semperoper Dresden, Staatsoper Hamburg and Deutsche Oper am Rhein. In summer 2024, she made her debut at the Bayreuth Festival as Gutrune in Götterdämmerung. Also in 2024, she made her role debuts as Leonore in Fidelio in Lisbon, as Chrysothemis in Elektra at the Semperoper Dresden and as Donna Elvira in Don Giovanni at the Staatsoper Unter den Linden.

== Awards ==
In 2005, the young singer won the international singing competition Kammeroper Schloss Rheinsberg for the role of “Hänsel” and was presented a prize by Vera and Volker Doppelfeld. For the remaining year, the young singer also played the role of the "Hänsel" at the theatres Brandenburg, Potsdam and Frankfurt an der Oder. She was laureate of the 9th International Mozart Competition 2006 in Salzburg. She is as well laureate of the "Armin-Weltner-Foundation" and the foundation "Lyra" of the Vontobel Bank.
