= Judith (Hebbel) =

1840 play written by Friedrich Hebbel

Judith is a play written in 1840 by the German poet and dramatist Friedrich Hebbel.

The play, composed at Hamburg, was Hebbel's first tragedy. The following year it was performed in Hamburg and Berlin, making Hebbel known throughout Germany. The opera Holofernes of Emil von Reznicek was composed on the motifs of the play.

Based on the deuterocanonical Book of Judith, Hebbel's adaptation presents a heroine who oversteps the boundaries of proper womanhood as defined by his 19th-century upbringing. Transforming the biblical story's political plot into a psychological exploration, he endowed Judith with a sexuality and beauty that prove fatal to the men around her: she is left a virgin on her wedding night because her beauty (or so she believes) renders her husband Manasses impotent, and in Holofernes's tent, she subconsciously exercises her repressed sexual desire, leading Holofernes to rape her so that she can subsequently behead him. "Holofernes prefigures the misogynist ideology of the fin-de-siecle", and while Judith resists the traditional female role she is given, she cannot transcend its restrictions.
