= Inês Thomas Almeida =

Portuguese musicologist

- Born: 11 June 1976; Santo Domingo, Dominican Republic
- Education: University of Évora, Hochschule für Musik und Theater Rostock, NOVA University of Lisbon
- Occupations: Musicologist, academic researcher, university lecturer
- Organizations: NOVA School of Social Sciences and Humanities / NOVA Universitity of Lisbon, University of Massachusetts Lowell
- Known for: historical musicology research, NGO Berlinda
- Notable work: Research on 18th-century music, women in music, historical lusophone music and culture, transnational cultural networks
- Awards: International Singing Contest Kammeroper Schloss Rheinsberg (2008)

Inês Thomas Almeida (born 11 June 1976 in Santo Domingo, Dominican Republic) is a Dominican Republic-born Portuguese musicologist, former lyric singer (mezzo-soprano) and former founder of the NGO Berlinda currently living in Lisbon.

== Life and career ==
Ines Thomas Almeida was born in the Dominican Republic and grew up in Portugal as a bilingual and with double nationality. After studying Piano at Instituto Gregoriano de Lisboa she entered the University of Évora to study singing, where she was twice awarded "Best Student of the University" in two consecutive years.

Lyrical singer: 2003-2011

In 2003 she moved to Germany and studied voice with Klaus Häger at the Rostock University of Music and Theater, having graduated there in 2007. As a member of the Opera Studio she performed several roles, such as the main role in Orfeo ed Euridice from Christoph Willibald Gluck and Zia Principessa in Suor Angelica from Giacomo Puccini. She also took masterclasses with Teresa Berganza, Krisztina Laki, Hanna Schwarz, Jill Feldman, Claudia Eder and Norman Shetler. She also performed as a soloist in many concerts in Germany.

In 2008 she was prizewinner of the International Singing Contest Kammeroper Schloss Rheinsberg, in which participated more than 450 candidates from 40 countries. As a prizewinner she sang in many productions at the Schloss Rheinsberg Opera. She also performed in the "Rheinsberger Sängernacht" with Arias from the Opera Carmen from Georges Bizet. She is a scholarship holder of the Yehudi Menuhin Live Music Now Foundation.

In February 2009, invited by the Embassy of the Dominican Republic in Portugal, she performed the recital Poema en Forma de Canciones at the Palácio Foz in Lisbon with art songs of Ibero-American composers.

She performed regularly in Portugal and in Germany.

In 2011 she created the NGO Berlinda, for the awareness, in Berlin, of the culture of Portuguese-speaking countries and for social help to the Portuguese community in Berlin.

Soon after, driven by her passion for historical research and intellectual work, she took the decision of abandoning her singing career and devoting her life to musicological research.

Musicologist: 2016 to present

In 2016 she returned to Portugal to pursue a PhD in Historical Musicology at the NOVA University Lisbon, which she obtained in 2021, with a dissertation titled "The German Gaze: Music Practice in Portugal at the End of the Ancien Régime According to German Sources”, which was awarded the highest classification unanimously.

From 2022 to 2024 she was a Post-Doctoral Fellow at the Institute for Literature and Tradition Studies (IELT) within the Project RELIT-Rom Literary Revisions: the creative application of ancient novels (15th-18th centuries), where she developed an online catalogue with Iberian Renaissance Music Repertoire (from old songbooks, manuscripts, etc.) based on the literary form of the romance velho.

Ines Thomas Almeida is currently a contract researcher and faculty member at the Institute of Ethnomusicology – Centre for Studies in Music and Dance (INET-md) of the NOVA University Lisbon. Her main research interests are women in music, music in the 18th century, modern travel literature, transnational cultural networks, lusophone music from a historical perspective, and German, Austrian and Portuguese cultural connections in the 18th century.

In 2021 she created the seminar Women Composers: A History of Female Composition from the Middle Ages to the 21st Century, which she has been teaching in various formats at Universidade Nova de Lisboa since then. She is Invited Professor in the PhD programme in Gender Studies at NOVA FCSH / ISCSP-UL / NOVA School of Law.

Between January and May 2025, she was a Visiting Professor at the University of Massachusetts Lowell, in the United States, where she lectured the seminar Lusophone Music and Culture.

Since 2024 she is Co-Coordinator of the Thematic Research Line on Studies on Women, Gender, and Sexuality at INET-md and Science Communication Coordinator of the COST Action PCPSce – Print Culture and Public Spheres in Central Europe (1500–1800), funded by European funds for 2024–2028 and comprising over one hundred researchers from 23 countries.

Ines Thomas Almeida has been invited to give lectures at the Universities of Harvard, Yale, Brown, Dartmouth, Complutense University of Madrid, and University of Music and Performing Arts Vienna.

She also engages as a music speaker for non-specialized audiences at the Lisbon Opera House and the Calouste Gulbenkian Foundation.
