= Marie Hüllenkremer =

German female journalist

Marie Hüllenkremer (14 March 1943 – 16 May 2004) was a Belgian-German journalist and culture politician.

== Life ==
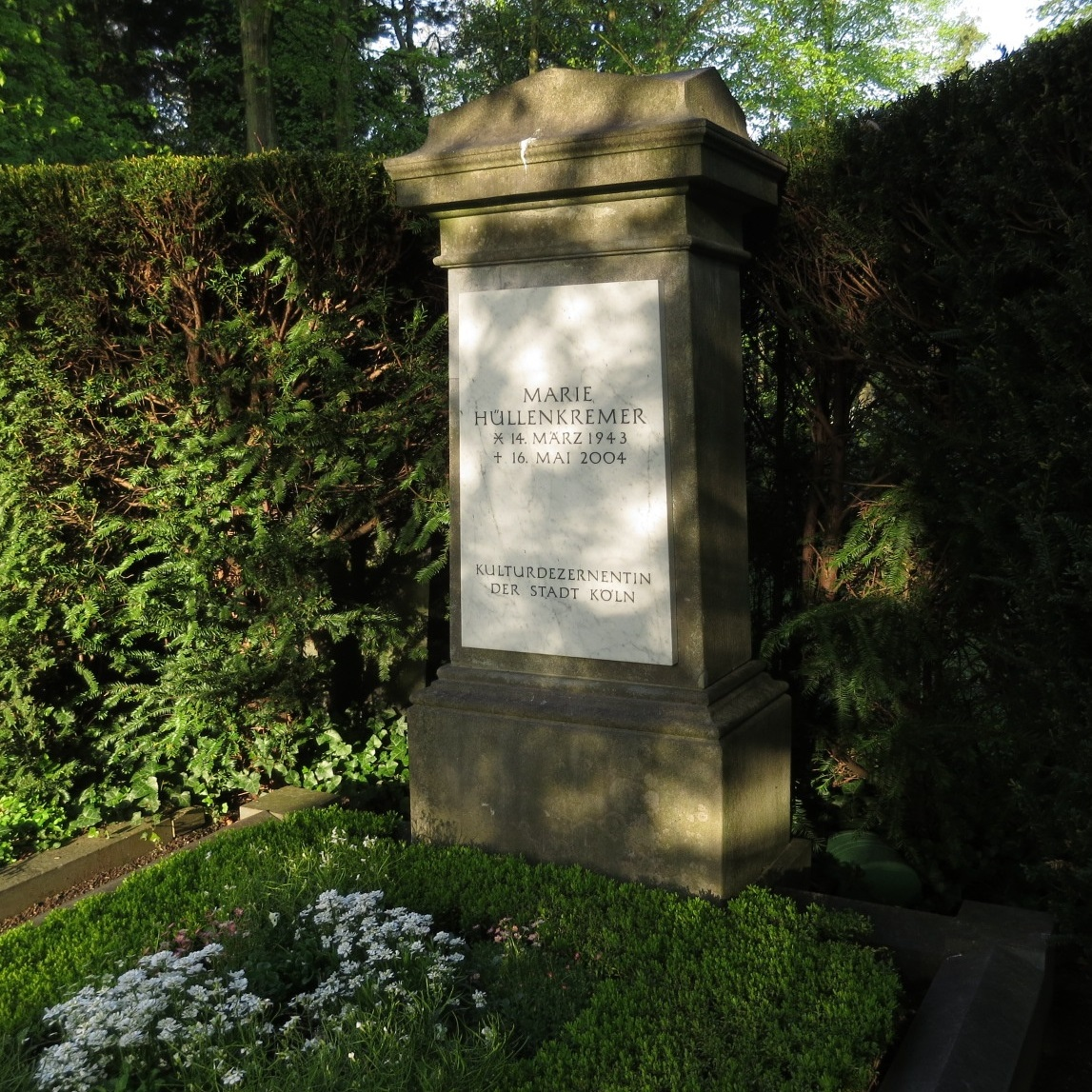
Grave at the Melaten Cemetery in Cologne, May 2015

Hüllenkremer was born in Eupen, Belgium. After studying German language and literature, she joined the Aachener Nachrichten in 1967 as editor in the culture section. From 1970 to 1978, she worked there as head of the culture and weekend supplements editorial department. She moved to the art magazine ART in 1979 and became a member of the culture editorial staff of the Kölner Stadt-Anzeiger in 1982. From 1985, she headed the department together with Rainer Hartmann. In 1989, she moved to Die Zeit magazine in a senior position. In 1992, she returned to the Kölner Stadt-Anzeiger as deputy editor-in-chief. On 1 October 1998, she was elected Kulturdezernentin of the city of Cologne. She held this office until her death.

Hüllenkremer died in Cologne at the age of 61. Her grave is located at the Kölner Melaten-Friedhof.
