= Manfred Roost =

German conductor and choir director (1929–2022)

Manfred Roost (26 March 1929 – 27 July 2022) was a German conductor and choir director.

== Life and career ==
Roost studied education and worked as a teacher in Jüterbog after his studies. He completed additional studies at the Institute for Music Education at the Humboldt University of Berlin; he studied conducting with Helmut Koch. From 1954, Roost worked as a music editor at the Deutschlandsender (GDR). In 1955, he founded the Rundfunk-Kinderchor [Radio Children's Choir] there on behalf of the German radio station, which he conducted from 1955 to 2002. From 1974, the choir had its home at the Georg-Friedrich-Händel-Gymnasium, a special school for music. In 1978, Roost was appointed professor. With his choir he undertook many concert tours and made extensive radio and audio recordings. In 1989, Roost was awarded the Goethe-Preis der Stadt Berlin. Roost died on 27 July 2022, at the age of 93.
