= Kammeroper Schloss Rheinsberg =

International opera festival for youth

Kammeroper Schloss Rheinsberg (Schloss Rheinsberg chamber opera) is an international opera festival for young singers, founded and first directed by composer Siegfried Matthus. It takes place every summer at the historical Schloss Rheinsberg, in Brandenburg, Germany. The festival presents the winners of the International Singing Competition Schloss Rheinsberg, in which about 450 candidates from all over the world participate every year.

== Festival ==
The Kammeroper Schloss Rheinsberg festival was founded in 1990 by Siegfried Matthus, who also composed the opening opera: "Die Weise von Liebe und Tod des Cornets Christoph Rilke". Experienced conductors and directors have worked with the young singers. Conductors have included Daniel Barenboim, Kurt Masur and Christian Thielemann, and directors have included Götz Friedrich, August Everding, Harry Kupfer and Axel Köhler.

The Festival has no orchestra of his own, but collaborates with German orchestras such as the RIAS Symphony Orchestra, the Junge Philharmonie Brandenburg, the Neubranbenburger Philharmonie, the Brandenburg State Orchestra, the Brandenburgische Philharmonie Potsdam, the Brandenburger Symphoniker and the Staatsorchester Braunschweig.

The Schlosstheater at Schloss Rheinsberg was completely restored in 2000. The festival also plays at the 18th-century Heckentheater garden theatre, with a capacity for 1000 spectators in a total area of 750 m^{2}. The festival also uses rooms in the palace for concerts.

Siegfried Matthus was artistic director of the festival from 1990, with Claudia Eder as voice advisor and Rainer Schwarz as manager and executive director. At Matthus' request he was succeeded in 2014 by his son, Frank Matthus, who was criticized for programming operas deemed to heavy for young artists, such as La traviata, Tosca and Carmen. Georg Quander was appointed artistic director in 2019 and tried a new concept.

== Singers ==
The festival has organised an annual am international singing competition in Berlin, with over 450 candidates from all over the world participating. The winners have the chance to perform roles in the opera festival productions, or to sing in the festival's concerts. Singers started a successful career through their appearance at the Rheinsberg festival, later performing at notable opera houses worldwide.

Former winners include Inês Thomas Almeida, winner of concert performances in 2008, Aris Argiris, winner of the title role in Don Giovanni in 2002, Claudia Barainsky, Annette Dasch, winner of the Countess in The Marriage of Figaro in 2000, Anett Fritsch, Marco Jentzsch, Andreas Karasiak, Olga Peretyatko, Gabriela Scherer, winner of Hänsel in Hänsel und Gretel in 2005, and Camilla Tilling.
