= The Idiot (opera) =

Opera by Mieczysław Weinberg

- Opera by Mieczysław Weinberg
- Language: Russian
- Based on: The Idiot by Fyodor Dostoyevsky
- Premiere: 9 May 2013; National Theatre Mannheim

The Idiot (Russian: Идиот, romanized: Idiot; Op.144, 1985), is a Russian-language opera by Mieczysław Weinberg after Fyodor Dostoyevsky's 1869 novel of the same name. The piece was given its world premiere at the National Theatre Mannheim, on 9 May 2013, conducted by Thomas Sanderling, followed by a recording on Pan Classics.

The work gained high attention at the Salzburg Festival of 2024 when Polish Krzysztof Warlikowski directed it at the Felsenreitschule. Conductor was Lithuanian Mirga Gražinytė-Tyla. The reaction of the audience was enthusiastic.
