= Siegfried Matthus =

German composer (1934–2021)

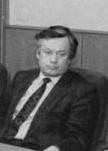
- Matthus in 1990
- Born: 13 April 1934; Mallenuppen, Germany
- Died: 27 August 2021 (aged 87); Stolzenhagen, Brandenburg, Germany
- Education: Hochschule für Musik "Hanns Eisler"
- Occupations: Composer, conductor, festival manager
- Organizations: Kammeroper Schloss Rheinsberg
- Awards: National Prize of the GDR; Patriotic Order of Merit; Order of Merit of the Federal Republic of Germany

Siegfried Matthus (13 April 1934 – 27 August 2021) was a German composer, conductor, and festival founder and manager. Some of his operas, such as Judith, were premiered at the Komische Oper Berlin in East Berlin. In 1991, he founded the chamber opera festival Kammeroper Schloss Rheinsberg and directed it until 2018. In 2005, he composed a Te Deum for the reopening of the Dresden Frauenkirche. Matthus is considered one of Germany's most often performed contemporary composers.

== Biography ==
Matthus was born in Mallenuppen (now in Ozyorsky District), East Prussia. His father was a farmer and played for entertainment and dancing. His father made sure that the son received piano lessons. In 1944, his parents fled with him to Läsikow in the Ruppin district. Matthus attended secondary school in Rheinsberg, followed by studies at the Hochschule für Musik Hanns Eisler in Berlin. After graduating, he continued his studies in composition with Rudolf Wagner-Régeny and Hanns Eisler, and was shortly thereafter made the youngest composer in residence in the history of the Komische Oper Berlin by Walter Felsenstein.

=== Stage works ===
Matthus composed more than a dozen stage works. The opera Die Weise von Liebe und Tod des Cornets Christoph Rilke (Cornet Christoph Rilke's song of love and death ) after Rainer Maria Rilke was completed in 1983, first performed in Dresden in 1985, and performed also by the Glyndebourne Touring Opera in 1993. The opera Graf Mirabeau (1987–88) is set during the French Revolution. It was commissioned for the 200th anniversary of Bastille Day and enjoyed simultaneous productions in both East and West Germany as well as Czechoslovakia, the Soviet Union and France. The opera was recorded by the Berlin State Opera. Other opera recordings include his Old Testament-based "opera vision" Judith (1984) by Komische Oper Berlin and Der letzte Schuss with the Berlin Radio Symphony Orchestra. In 2003 he composed music for both a ballet and an opera adaptation of Michael Ende's The Neverending Story.

=== Orchestral music ===
Matthus was a prolific composer of works for orchestra as well as chamber and recital compositions. In 1979, Responso, a four-movement symphony was played by the Dresdner Staatskapelle in front of the UN in New York City with a worldwide broadcast. He enjoyed a close working relationship with conductor Kurt Masur who presented many world premieres of his music. Masur also conducted what Matthus called "the commission of my life", a Te Deum for the reopening of the Dresden Frauenkirche after restoration, broadcast live on 11 November 2005. His works are featured on more than twenty recordings by several of Germany's leading symphony orchestras and chamber music ensembles. His 1975 Cello Concerto and his Second Symphony were recorded in 1978 by cellist Josef Schwab and the orchestra of the Komische Oper, conducted by the composer. A reviewer described the works as "deeply honest, uncompromising though highly communicative". For the occasion of his 70th birthday in 2004, a recording combined three concertos with orchestra recorded earlier with the Rundfunk-Sinfonieorchester Saarbrücken: the 1982 Concerto for Trumpet and Percussion, the 1994 Manhattan Concerto, and Der Wald (The forest), a 1984 percussion concerto. On 25 January 2009, Leon Botstein conducted Responso at the Avery Fisher Hall, New York City, with the American Symphony Orchestra.

=== Festival ===
In 1991, Matthus founded the Kammeroper Schloss Rheinsberg festival. He was its artistic director until 2018. He was an honorary citizen of Rheinsberg.

=== Personal life ===
Since 1957, Matthus was married to the singer Helga Matthus. They had a son, Frank Matthus (born 1964), and lived in Stolzenhagen, part of Wandlitz, near Berlin. Matthus died in his home on 27 August 2021 at the age of 87 after a protracted illness.

== Compositions ==
Matthus composed more than 600 works. His oeuvre includes 14 operas, over 60 large orchestral works, numerous chamber music, ballet scenes and film music.

=== Opera ===
- 1960–63 Lazarillo von Tormes
- 1966/67 Der letzte Schuss (The Last Shot)
- 1971 Noch einen Löffel Gift, Liebling? (Another Spoonful of Poison, Darling?) (Comic crime opera by Peter Hacks after the comedy Risky Marriage by Saul O'Hara)
- 1972–74 Omphale (text by Hacks)
- 1974 Mario the Magician
- 1983/84 Die Weise von Liebe und Tod des Cornets Christoph Rilke (Cornet Christoph Rilke's song of love and death ) (text after Rainer Maria Rilke)
- 1982–84 Judith (after the play by Friedrich Hebbel)
- 1987/88 Graf Mirabeau
- 1990 "Judith" American Premiere at the Santa Fe Opera
- 1990/91 Desdemona und ihre Schwestern (Desdemona and her Sisters) (text after Christine Brückner)
- 1998 Farinelli oder die Macht des Gesanges (Farinelli or The Power of Singing)
- 1998/99 Kronprinz Friedrich (libretto by Thomas Höft)
- 2003 Die unendliche Geschichte (after Michael Ende's The Neverending Story commissioned by the Department for Culture of Rhineland-Palatinate, libretto by Anton Perrey)
- 2007: Cosima, reconstruction of an opera fragment by Friedrich Nietzsche
- 2019: Effi Briest, after the novel by Theodor Fontane commissioned by Staatstheater Cottbus, to a libretto by Frank Matthus

== Awards ==
- 1972 and 1984 National Prize of the GDR, 2nd class
- 1979 Patriotic Order of Merit in bronze
- 1984 honorary citizen of the city of Rheinsberg
- 1995/96 Prize of the International Theater Institute Berlin
- 1998 Prize of the Association of German Critics
- 2000 Officer's Cross of the Order of Merit of the Federal Republic of Germany
- 2007 Renaming of the new event hall in the port village of Rheinsberg to the "Siegfried-Matthus-Arena"
- 2014 Commander's Cross of the Order of Merit of the Federal Republic of Germany
