= Komische Oper Berlin =

German opera company based in Berlin

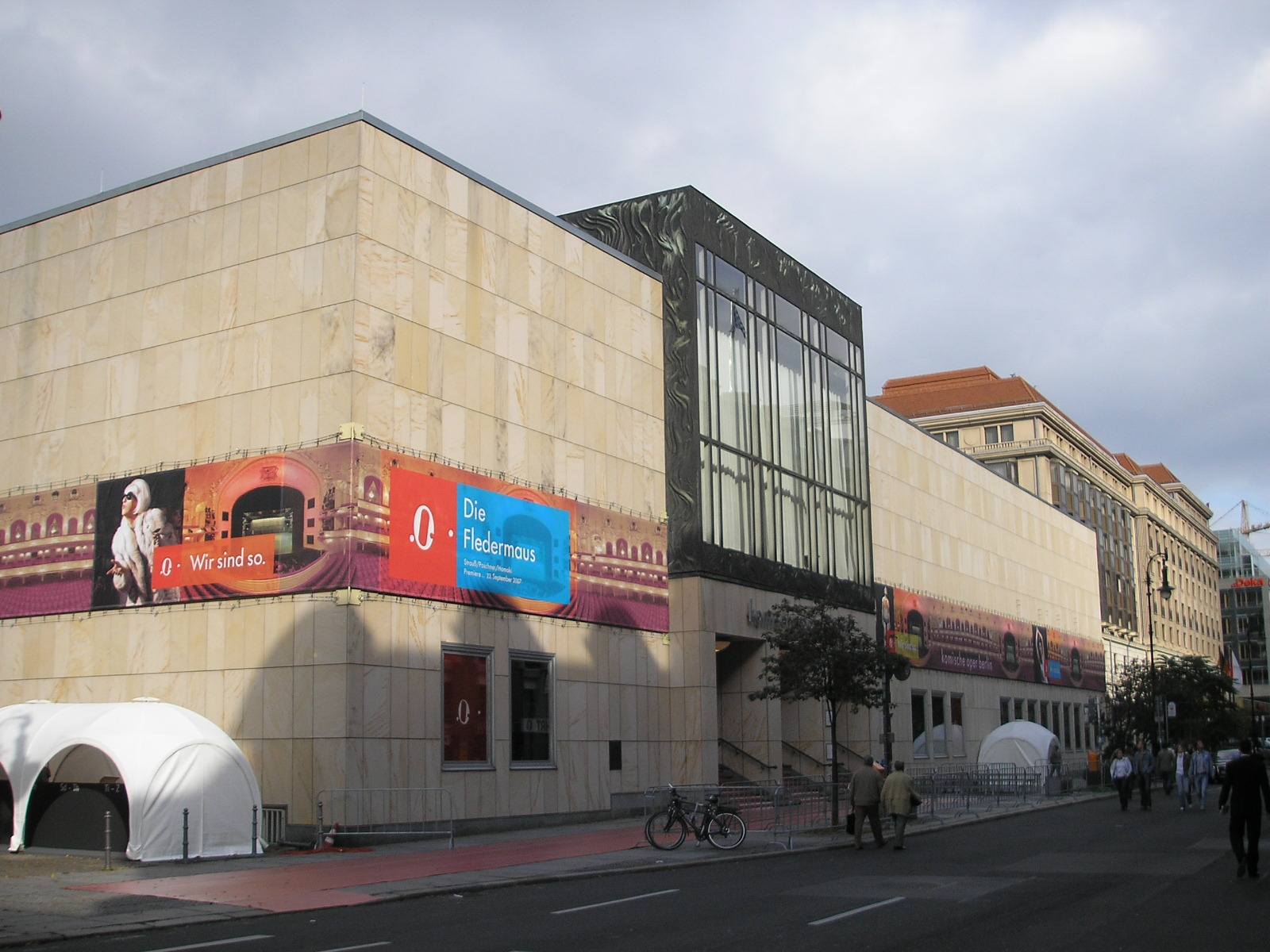
- Formation: 1892
- Location: Berlin, Germany
- Coordinates: 52°30′57″N 13°23′13″E
- Intendant: Susanne Moser, Philip Bröking
- Website: www.komische-oper-berlin.de

The Komische Oper Berlin (Note: The names mentioned should not be confused with similar names of other theatres in Berlin. The theatre is not identical to the "Theater unter den Linden" which operated from 1933 to 1945 in the former "Kleines Theater" at Unter den Linden 44; nor to the "Staatsoper Unter den Linden", the Berlin State Opera. Neither is it identical to the "Metropol-Theater" that operated in the former Admiralspalast from 1955 into the 1990s. Furthermore, today's "Komische Oper" has no connection to the "Komische Oper (an der Weidendammer Brücke)" which operated from 1905 into the 1920s as an opera theater, later as an operetta theatre, and finally as a revue theatre.) is a German opera company based in Berlin. The company produces operas, operettas and musicals.

The opera house is located on Behrenstraße, near Unter den Linden. Since 2004, the Komische Oper Berlin, along with the Berlin State Opera, the Deutsche Oper Berlin, the Berlin State Ballet, and the Bühnenservice Berlin (Stage and Costume Design), has been a member of the Berlin Opera Foundation.

== History of the building ==
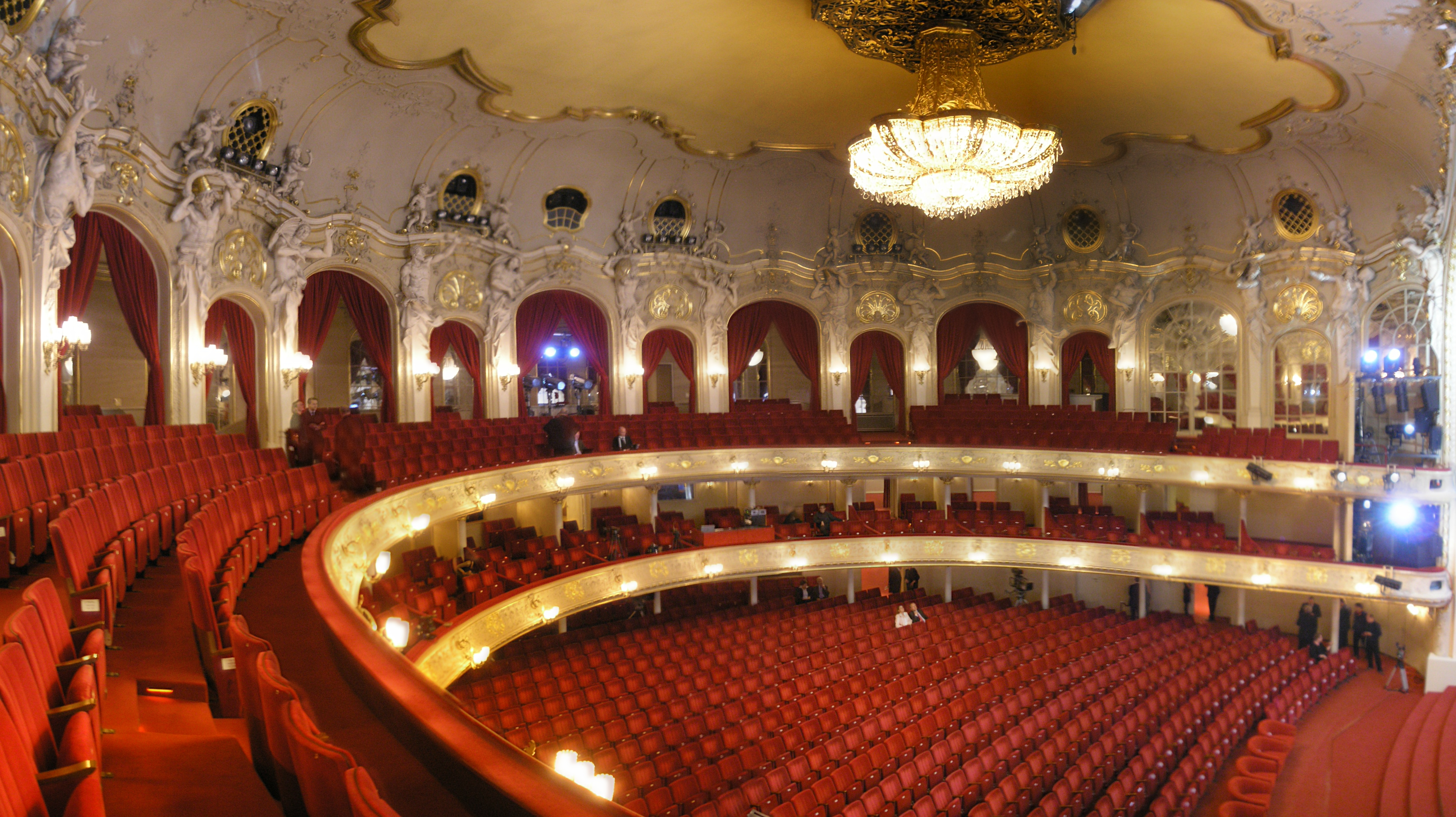
Interior of Komische Oper Berlin

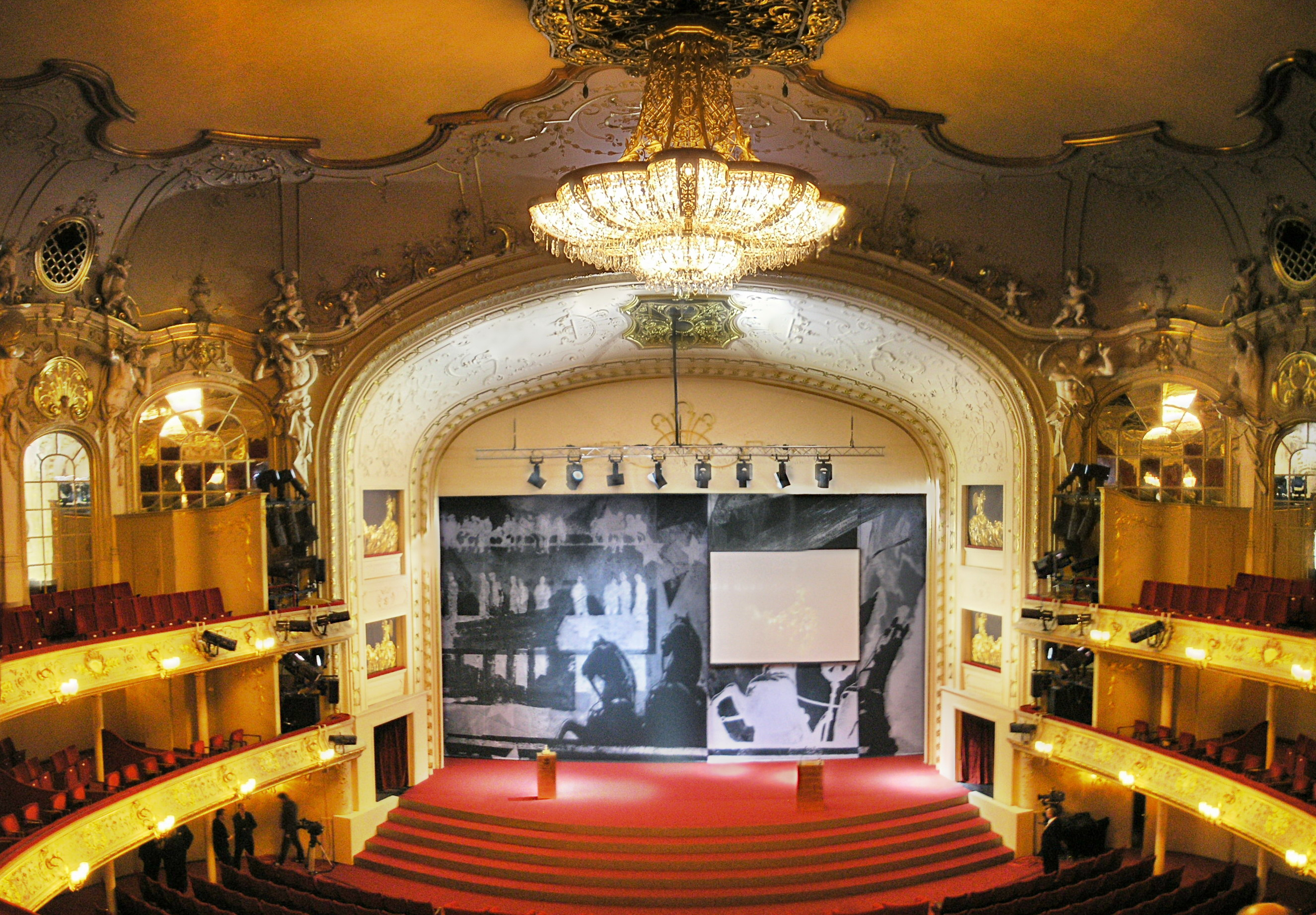
Stage of Komische Oper Berlin

The theatre was built between 1891 and 1892 by architects Ferdinand Fellner and Hermann Helmer for a private society. It first opened on 24 September 1892 as "Theater Unter den Linden" with Adolf Ferron's operetta Daphne and Gaul and Haßreiter's ballet Die Welt in Bild und Tanz.

The theatre was primarily a vehicle for operetta, but was also used for various other events and balls. Around 800 people could be seated in the stalls, and the balconies and various en-suite dinner rooms housed about a further 1,700 seats. Its directors went bankrupt in 1896 and the theatre was forced to close its doors.

On 3 September 1898 the theatre was reopened as the Metropol-Theater (Berlin-Mitte) with Julius Freund's revue Paradies der Frauen. It then grew to become one of Berlin's most famous and successful variety theatres. During the 1920s and early 1930s, it was leased by the brothers Alfred and Fritz Rotter. Under their management, it saw the premieres of two operettas by Franz Lehár – Friederike (opera) in 1928 and Das Land des Lächelns in 1929, both starring Richard Tauber. However, due to a decline of variety and music hall entertainment the theatre was again closed in 1933.

In 1934 the theatre was nationalised and renamed Staatliches Operettentheater. It operated as part of the Nazi Kraft durch Freude entertainment and leisure programmes. During World War II, the auditorium was damaged by Allied bombing on 7 May 1944. The façade, entrance hall, and auditorium ceiling murals were destroyed by bombs on 9 March 1945.

After the war, the theatre was in East Germany, being that the building was in the eastern part of Berlin. Following repair works and provisional rebuilding, the theatre reopened on 23 December 1947, as the Komische Oper with Johann Strauss's operetta Die Fledermaus.

The 1950s saw various further alterations and extensions. The theatre was completely rebuilt in 1965/1966 by Architektenkollektiv Kunz Nierade, adding functional extensions and giving the theatre a completely new exterior. The theatre reopened again on 4 December 1966, with Mozart's Don Giovanni. The auditorium underwent further restoration in 1986, and the stage technology was further modernised by 1989. Today the theatre seats 1,270. Starting in August 2023, renovations began on the theatre. Over an expected period of five seasons, the company is planning for its productions to occur at alternative venues, including the Schiller Theater and an unused airport hangar at Berlin Tempelhof Airport.

== The Komische Oper company ==
In 1947, Walter Felsenstein founded and led the resident opera company, the Komische Oper, until his death in 1975. Götz Friedrich was an assistant to Felsenstein at the company. Joachim Herz became general director after Felsenstein's death and served until 1981. Subsequently, Harry Kupfer directed the company for 21 seasons, until 2002. The company specializes in German language productions of opera, operetta and musicals. In 2007 the company won, jointly with Oper Bremen, the Opera House of the Year award by the German magazine Opernwelt. In 2015, it received the "Opera Company of the Year" award at the International Opera Awards. From 2002 to 2012, the company's chief director and Intendant was Andreas Homoki.

In June 2008, the company announced the appointment of Barrie Kosky to succeed Homoki as its next Intendant, as of the 2012/2013 season. In October 2014, his contract with the company was extended through 2022. Since 2005, the company's managing director has been Susanne Moser. In January 2019, the company announced multiple scheduled management changes effective with the 2022–2023 season:

- Kosky stood down as its Intendant at the close of the 2021–2022 season, and subsequently continued his affiliation with the company as Hausregisseur (in-house director).
- Moser and the company's current Operndirektor, Philip Bröking, became joint Intendants of the company effective with the 2022–2023 season.

From 1966 to 2004, the theatre was also home to a resident ballet company – first as the "Tanztheater der Komischen Oper", and then from 1999 as "BerlinBallett – Komische Oper". In 2004, due to budgetary problems, the separate ballet companies of Berlin's three opera houses were merged into a single company called the Staatsballett Berlin.

Past General Music Directors (GMD) of the company have included Kurt Masur, Rolf Reuter, Yakov Kreizberg, Kirill Petrenko, Carl St.Clair, Patrick Lange. and Ainārs Rubiķis. In January 2022, the company announced the appointment of James Gaffigan as its next music director, effective with the 2023–2024 season, with an initial contract of 4 years.

=== World premieres ===
- 1967: Siegfried Matthus: Der letzte Schuß
- 1972: Siegfried Matthus: Noch einen Löffel Gift, Liebling
- 1985: Siegfried Matthus: Judith
- 1991: Georg Katzer: Antigone oder die Stadt
- 2008: Frank Schwemmer: Robin Hood
- 2009: Christian Jost: Hamlet, Opernwelt: "Uraufführung des Jahres" (new opera of the year)
- 2010: Pierangelo Valtinoni: Die Schneekönigin
- 2012: Olga Neuwirth: American Lulu, commissioned in collaboration with The Opera Group London
- 2012: Taner Akyol: Ali Baba und die 40 Räuber
- 2013: Miloš Vacek: Des Kaisers neue Kleider
- 2015: Elena Kats-Chernin: Schneewittchen und die 77 Zwerge (Snow White and the 77 Dwarves)

=== General Music Directors ===
- Kurt Masur (1960–1964)
- Géza Oberfrank (1973–1976)
- Rolf Reuter (1981–1993)
- Yakov Kreizberg (1994–2001)
- Kirill Petrenko (2002–2007)
- Carl St. Clair (2008–2010)
- Patrick Lange (2010–2012)
- Henrik Nánási (2012–2018)
- Ainārs Rubiķis (2018–2023)
- James Gaffigan (2023–present)

== See also ==
- Music in Berlin
