= Waldfriedhof Zehlendorf =

Cemetery in Berlin, Germany

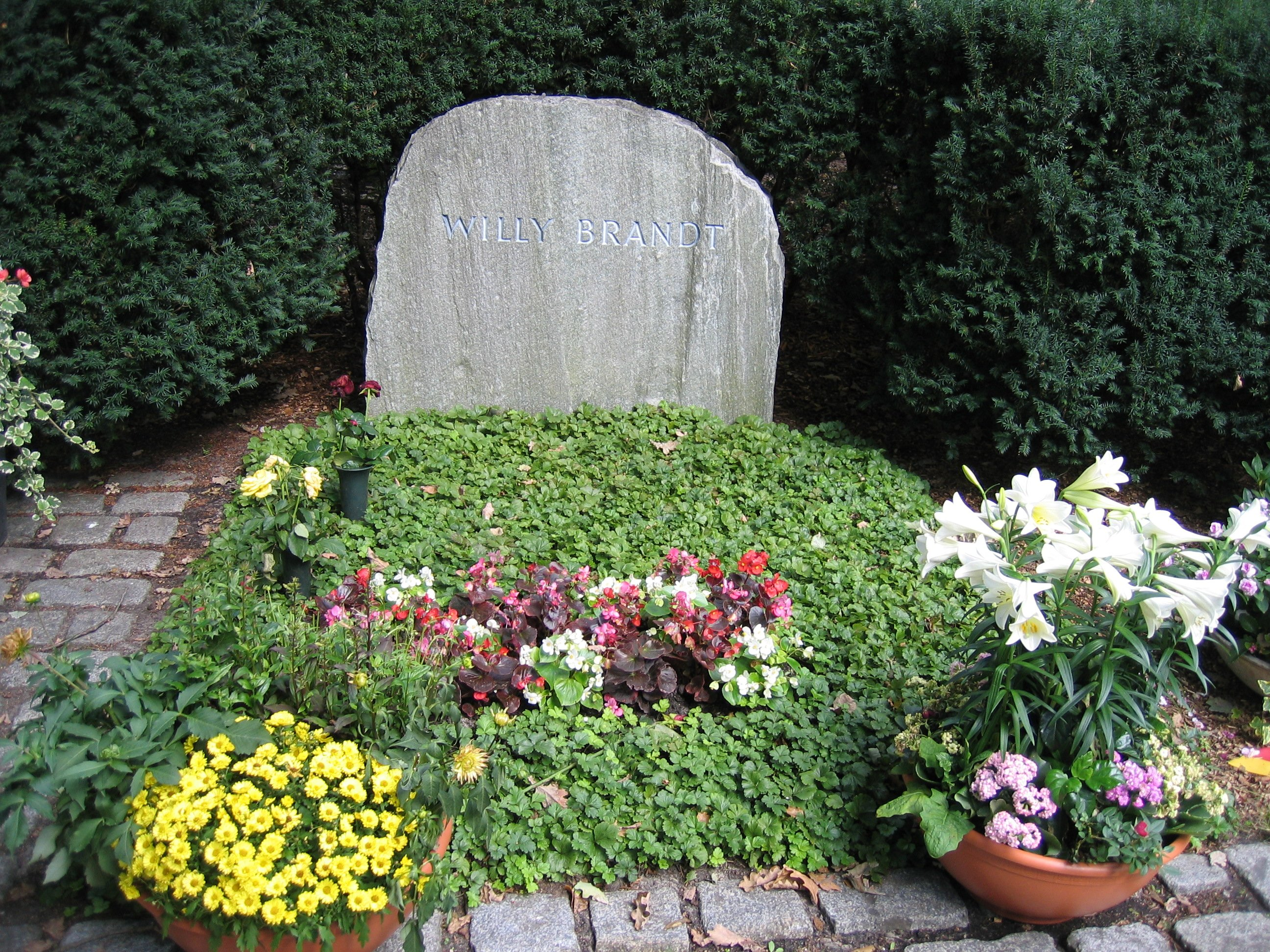
- Ehrengrab of Willy Brandt
- Interactive map of Waldfriedhof Zehlendorf

Details
- Location: Nikolassee, Berlin
- Country: Germany
- Coordinates: 52°25′27″N 13°13′00″E

Waldfriedhof Zehlendorf (Zehlendorf forest cemetery) is a cemetery located in Berlin's Nikolassee district. The cemetery occupies an area of 376,975 m^{2}. An additional Italian war cemetery was created there in 1953. A number of notable people of Berlin are buried at the cemetery; some have a grave of honor (German: Ehrengrab). In particular, all of Berlin's deceased post-war mayors are buried here.

== Landscape and buildings ==
The northern part of the cemetery was built between 1945 and 1947 by Herta Hammerbacher, and expanded from 1948 to 1954 by Max Dietrich. About a third of the area was forest, which was already 50 years old and was intentionally kept. The trees are mostly firs, with a few oaks, mountain-ashes and birches. Two straight paths in north–south direction structure the cemetery, connected by curved paths. The funeral halls are situated on a natural hill. Between the entrance and the halls is a large U-shaped meadow which was originally designed as heath. The graves are arranged in rows, both in the meadow part as in the forest part.

A war cemetery was created in 1953 for 1,183 Italian POWs, many of them unidentified, who died or were killed near Berlin. It is lined by trees and bushes and thus separated from the rest of the cemetery. The grave plates are arranged in a regular pattern.

Two halls, called Feierhallen (celebration halls) or Kapelle (chapel), on a hill were built from 1956 to 1958 by Sergius Ruegenberg and Wolf von Möllendorff. A larger and a smaller hall are connected by smaller administrative buildings. In front of the halls, two high walls covered with travertine symbolize the transition from life to death. The halls are reinforced concrete structures, with fronts of glass open to nature. Architect Ruegenberg, a student of Hans Scharoun, built simple rectangular elements on the walls and ceiling, based on a square module, and achieved "zurückhaltende Feierlichkeit" (reticent solemnity). An entrance gate at the Potsdamer Chaussee was built in 1950 by Friedrich Dückerstieg, and a gate at Wasgensteig in 1959 by Hans-Joachim Sachse and Bernhard Busen. A bell tower on the meadow was created in 1973 by Ruegenberg and Möllendorff.

== Notable people ==
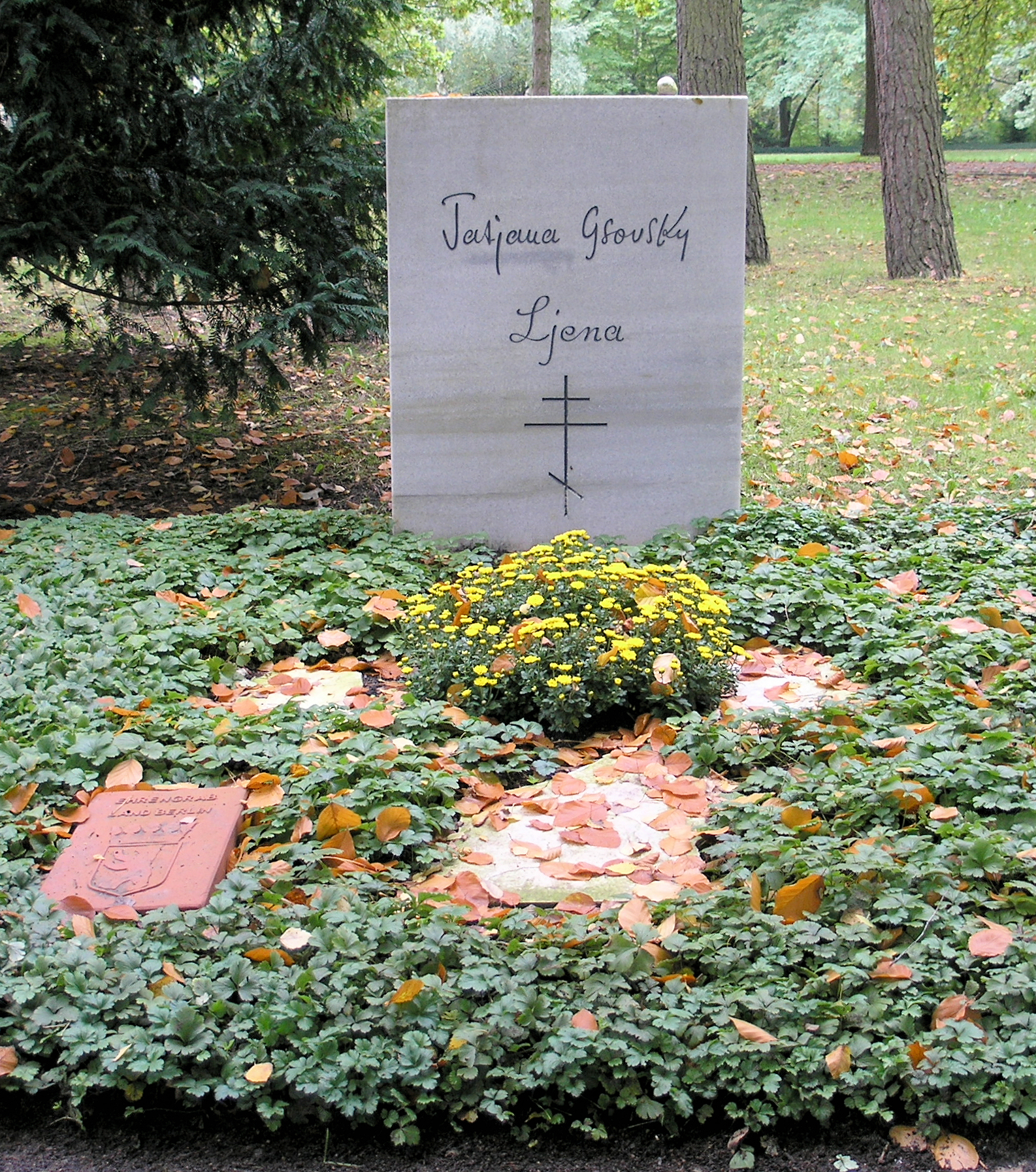
Tatjana Gsovsky

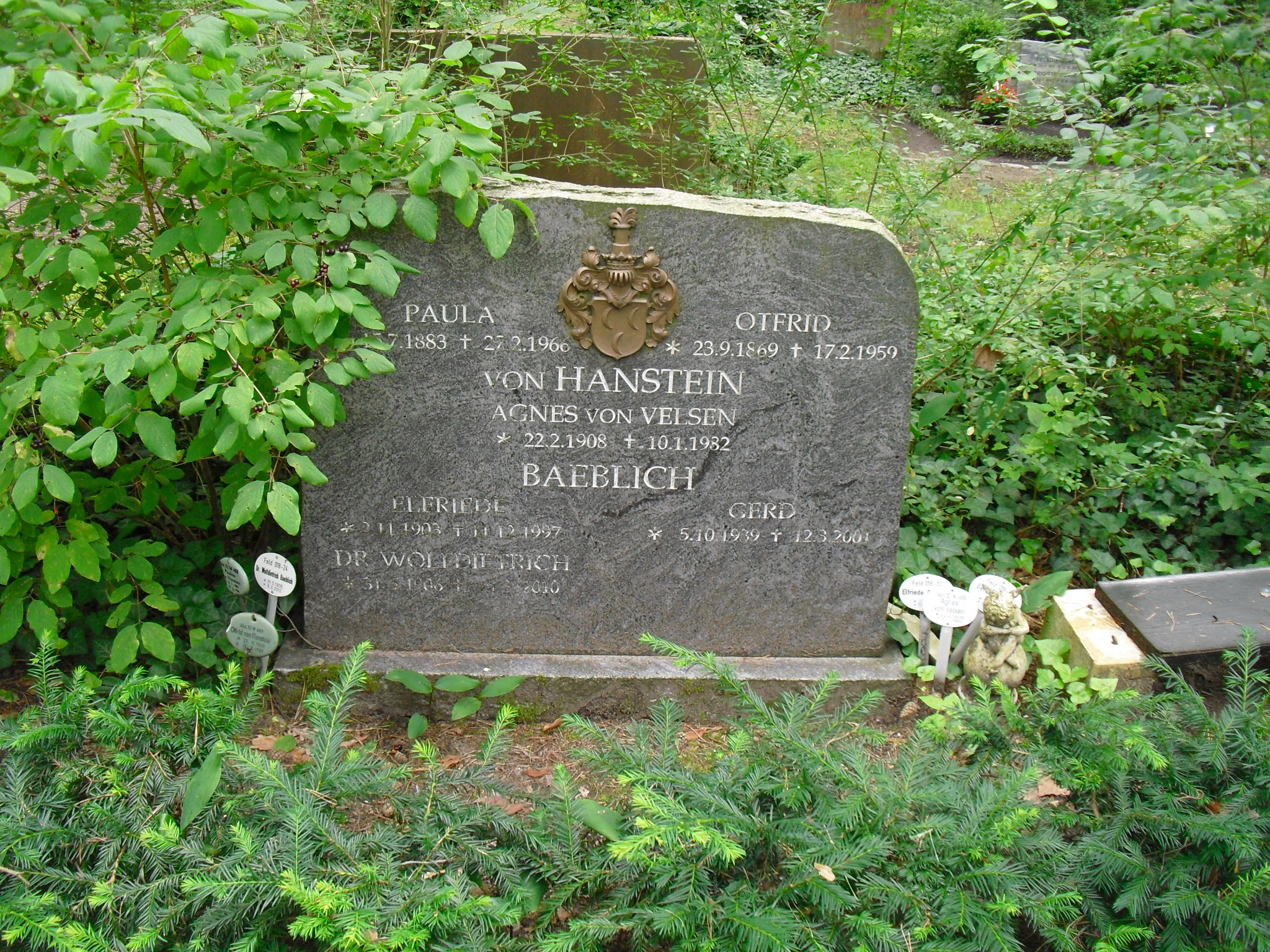
Otfrid von Hanstein & Paula von Hanstein

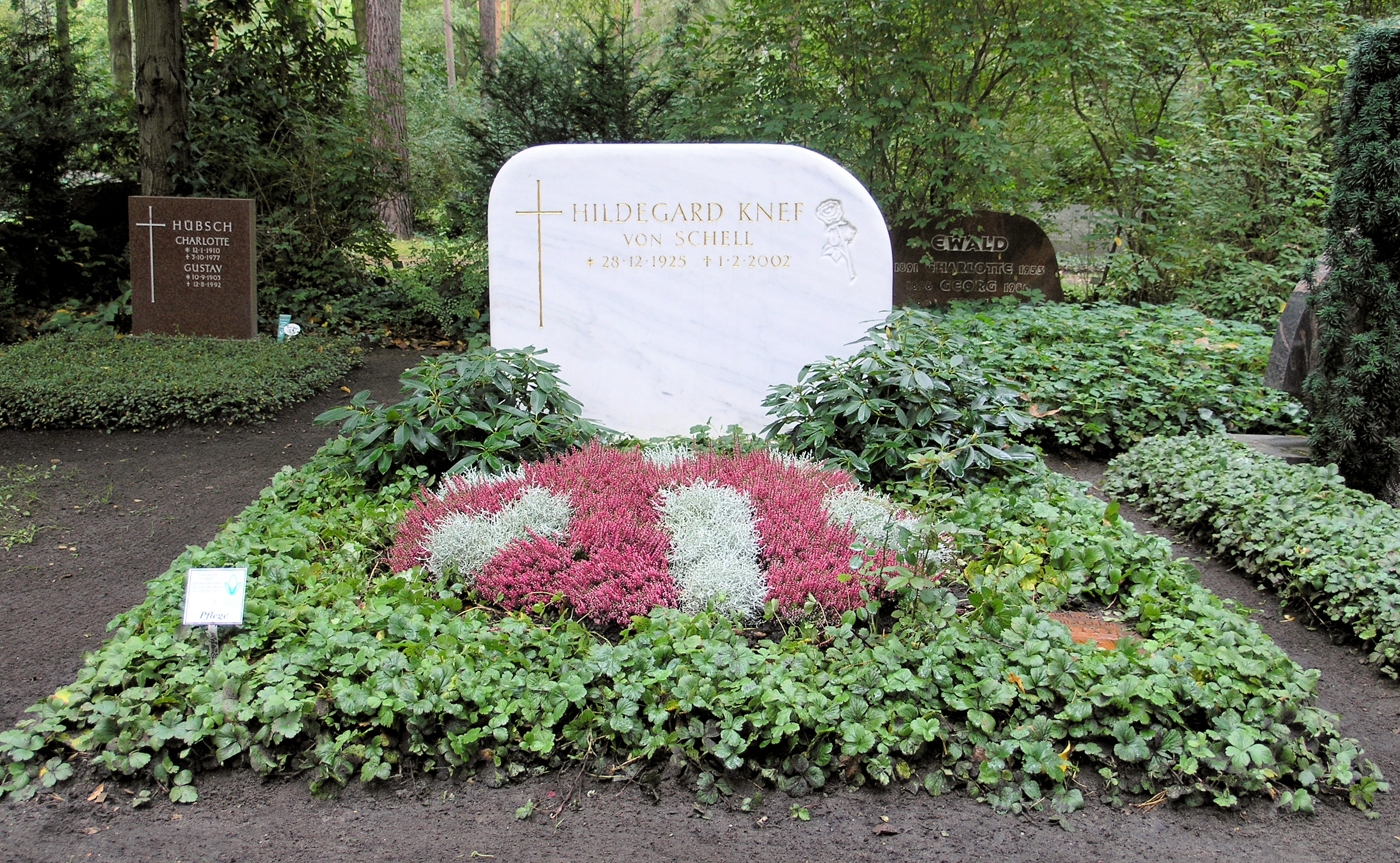
Hildegard Knef

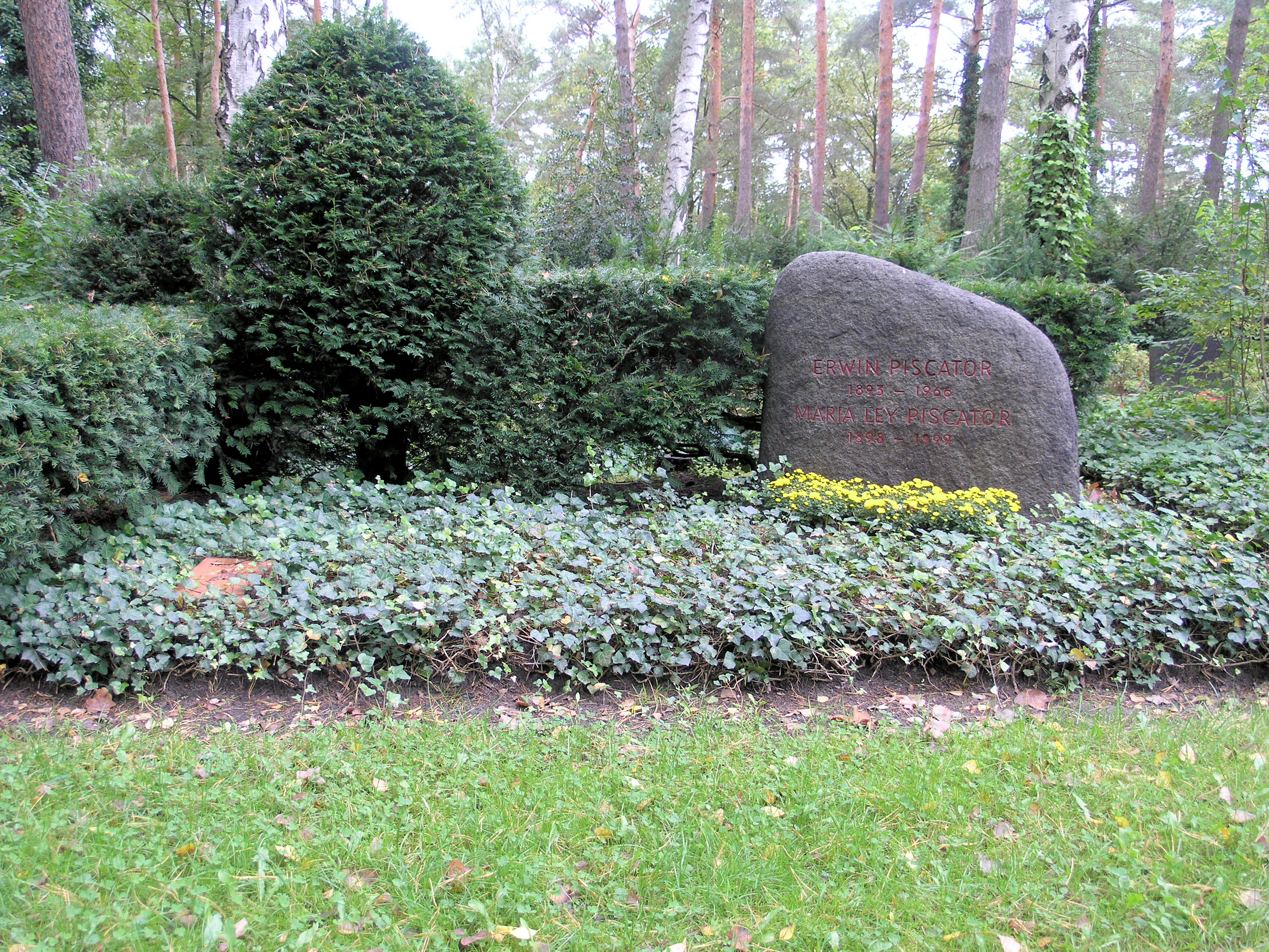
Erwin Piscator

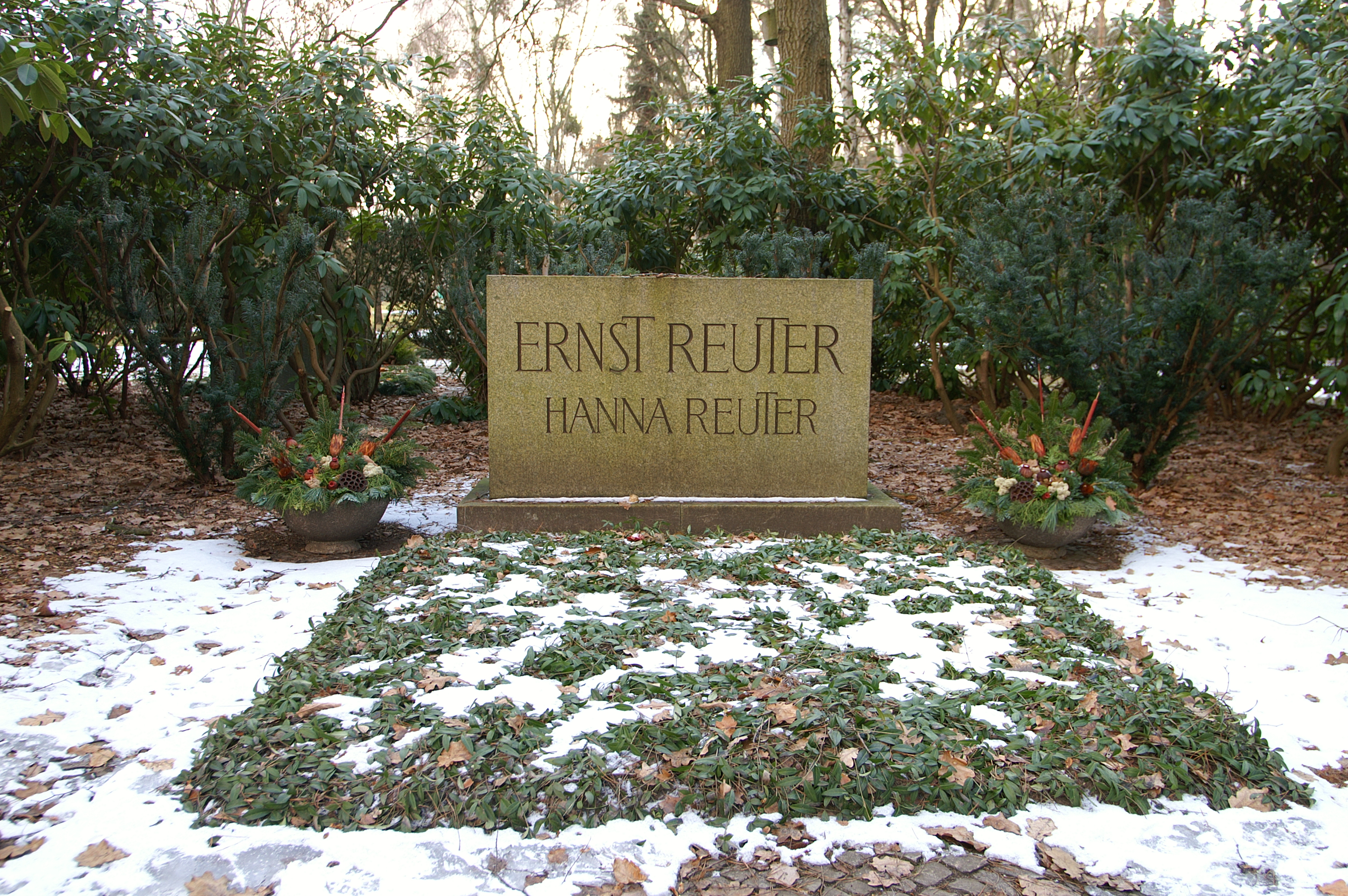
Ernst Reuter

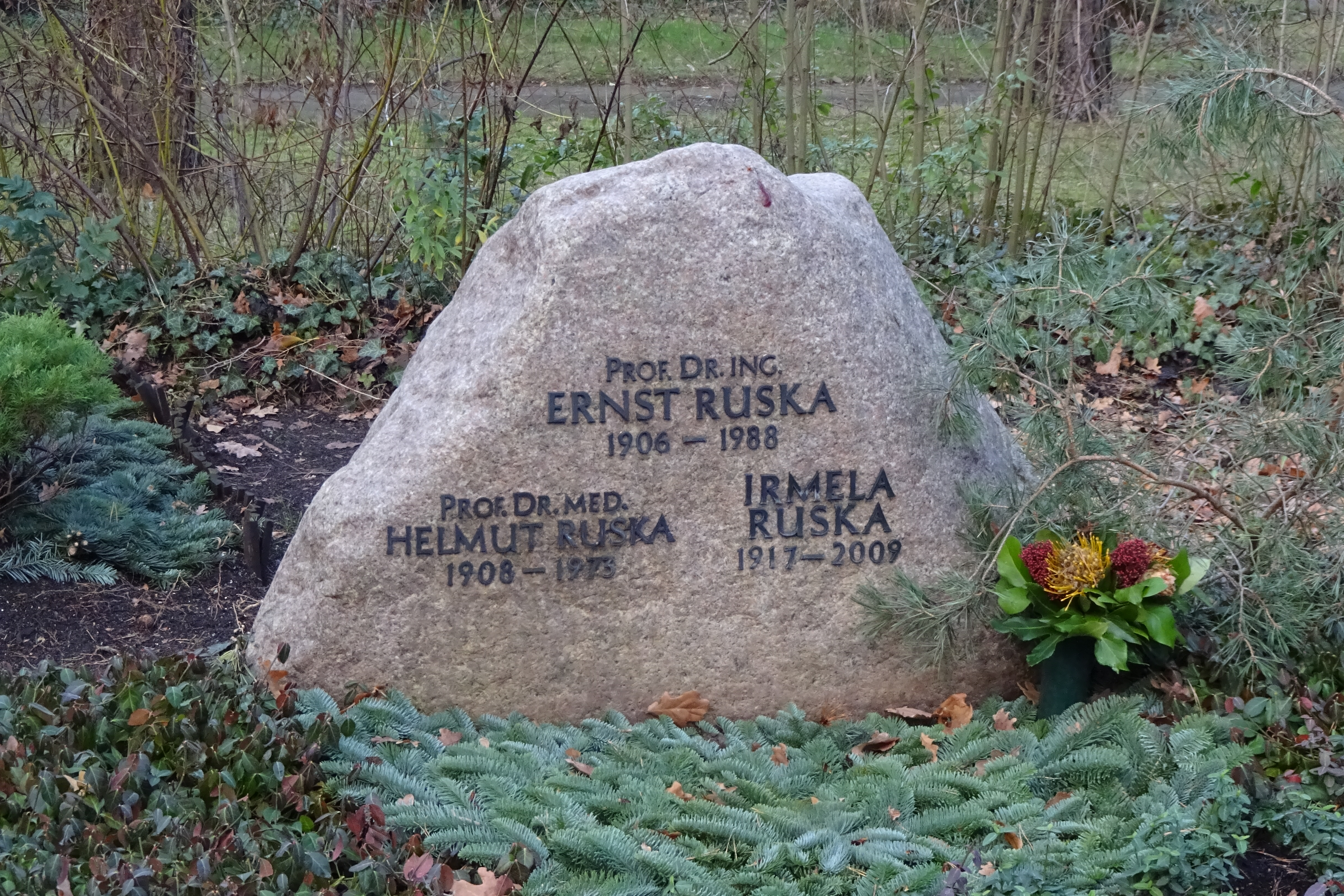
Ernst Ruska & Helmut Ruska

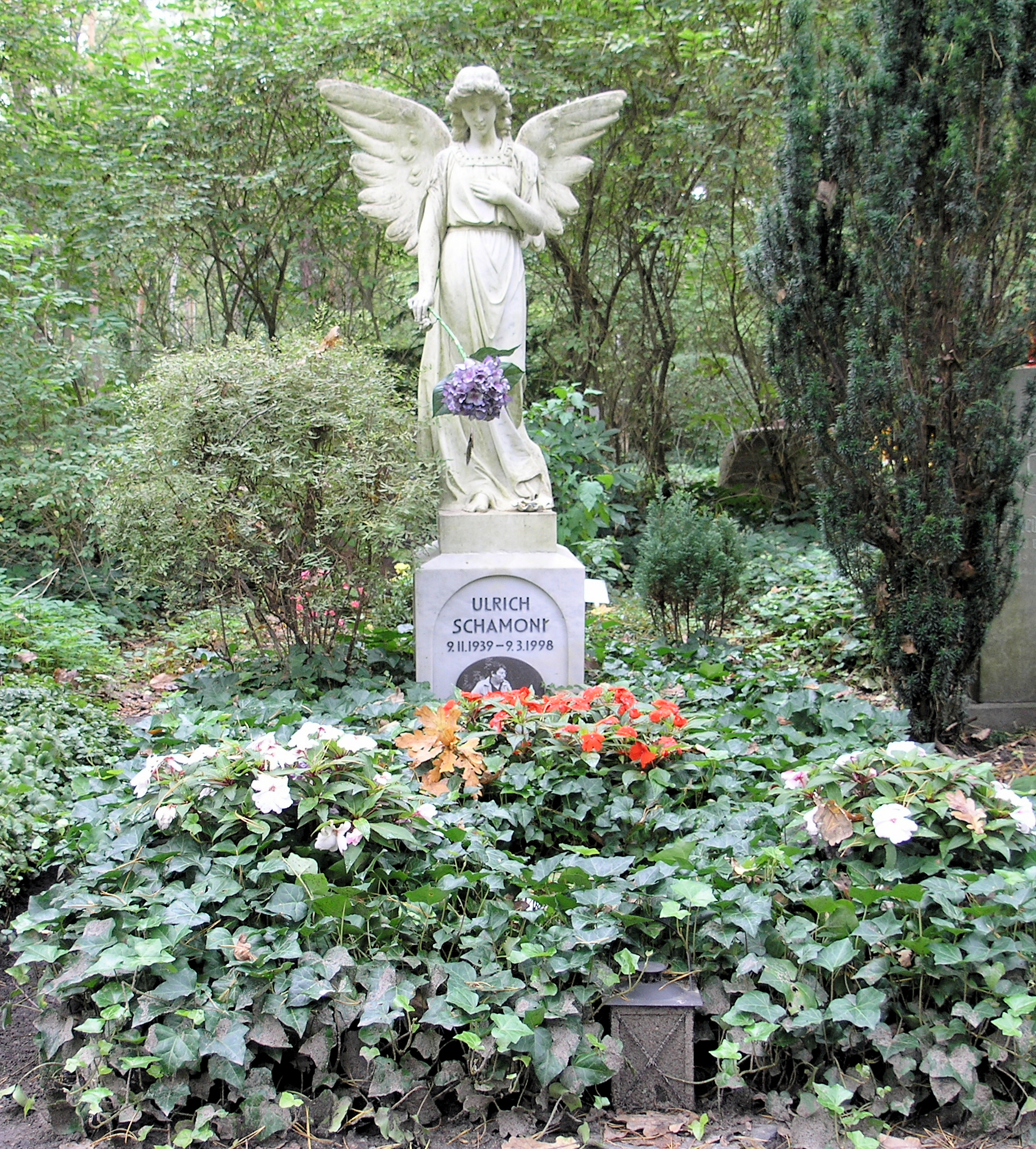
Ulrich Schamoni

Many Berlin celebrities are buried on the Waldfriedhof Zehlendorf. 43 (as of 2002) have an Ehrengrab, cared for by the Berlin Senate (marked by * in the following list), including Willy Brandt, Mayor of Berlin and Bundeskanzler, and ballet dancer and choreographer Tatjana Gsovsky.

- Hans Beirer (1911–1993), Kammersänger
- Gerhard Bienert (1898–1986), actor
- Günther Birkenfeld (1901–1966), writer
- Boris Blacher* (1903–1975), composer
- Peter Bloch (1900–1984), politician
- Peter Bloch Jr. (1925–1994), art historian and academic teacher
- Jan Bontjes van Beek (1899–1969), ceramic artist
- Rut Brandt (1920–2006), author, married to Willy Brandt
- Willy Brandt* (1913–1992), politician, Mayor of Berlin, Bundeskanzler
- Herwig Friedag (1921–2012), journalist
- Fritz Eberhard (1896–1982), publicist, politician
- Hendrikje Fitz (1961–2016), actress
- Peter Fitz (1931–2013), stage and film actor
- Götz Friedrich (1930–2000), opera and theatre director.
- Ekkehard Fritsch (1922–1987), actor
- Ernst Fritsch (1892–1965), painter
- Fritz Genschow (1905–1977), actor
- Tatjana Gsovsky* (1901–1993), ballet dancer
- Ina Halley (1927–1992), actress
- Edith Hancke (1928–2015), stage, film and television actress
- Otfrid von Hanstein (1869–1959), actor and writer
- Paula von Hanstein (1883–1966), writer
- Karl Hartung (1908–1967), sculptor
- Hermann Henselmann (1905–1995), architect
- Karl-Josef Hering (1929–1998) Kammersänger and actor
- Martin Held* (1908–1992), actor
- Martin Hirthe (1921–1981), actor
- Wolfgang Holst (1922–2010), president of Hertha BSC
- Helmut Käutner* (1908–1980), stage director
- Jakob Kaiser* (1888–1961), Federal Minister
- Gustav Klingelhöfer* (1888–1961), politician
- Hildegard Knef* (1925–2002), actress
- Hermine Körner (1878–1960), actress
- Gerhard Lamprecht (1897–1974), director and screenwriter
- Léo Lania (1896–1961), journalist, playwright and screenwriter
- Annedore Leber* (1904–1968), journalist and politician
- Julius Leber* (1891–1945), resistance fighter
- Ernst Lemmer* (1898–1970), Federal Minister
- Eva Lissa (1913–1988), actress
- Paul Löbe* (1875–1967), President of the Reichstag
- Heinrich Lummer (1932–2019), politician
- Gerd Martienzen* (1918–1988), actor
- Christiane Maybach (1932–2006), film and television actress
- Klaus Miedel (1915–2000), actor
- Wolfgang Menge (1924–2012), writer and journalist
- Wolfgang Müller (1922–1960), actor
- Wolfgang Neuss (1923–1989), actor
- Maria Ney (1890–1961), cabaret performer
- Bruno Paul* (1874–1968), architect
- Günter Pfitzmann (1924–2003), actor
- Erwin Piscator* (1893–1966), stage director
- Gerhart Pohl* (1902–1966), writer
- Ernst Reuter* (1889–1953), Mayor of Berlin
- Ernst Ruska (1906–1988), engineer
- Helmut Ruska (1908–1973), physician
- Ulrich Schamoni (1939–1998), stage director
- Hans Scharoun* (1893–1972), architect
- Clemens Schmalstich (1880–1960), composer and conductor
- Wolfdietrich Schnurre* (1920–1989), writer and illustrator
- Bubi Scholz (1930–2000), boxer (moved to Friedhof Heerstraße)
- Richard Schubert* (1877–1955), resistance fighter
- Karl Schuke (1906–1987), organ builder
- Klaus Schütz* (1926–2012), politician, Mayor of Berlin
- Karl-Tobias Schwab (1887–1967), designer, medalist and academic teacher
- Peter Seum (1949–1998) actor
- Ruth Stephan (1925–1975), actress
- Heinz Striek (1918–2011), politician
- Otto Suhr* (1894–1957), politician, Mayor of Berlin
- Charlotte Tiedemann (1919–1979), German singer and actress
- Heinz Trökes (1913–1997), painter
- Wilhelm Weise (1936–2012), physician, director of the Robert Koch-Institut
- Wolfgang Zeller (1893–1967), composer

== Literature ==
- Klaus Hammer: Historische Friedhöfe & Grabmäler in Berlin. Stattbuch, Berlin 1994
- Klaus Konrad Weber, Peter Güttler, Ditta Ahmadi (Hrsg.): Berlin und seine Bauten. Teil X Band A: Anlagen und Bauten für die Versorgung (3) Bestattungswesen. Wilhelm Ernst & Sohn, Berlin 1981, ISBN 3433008906
- Hans-Jürgen Mende: Lexikon Berliner Grabstätten. Haude & Spener, Berlin 2006. ISBN 377590476X
