= Deborah York =

British soprano (born 1964)

- Born: 1964 (age 60–61); Sheffield, Yorkshire, England
- Education: University of Manchester
- Occupation: Classical soprano

Deborah York, born 1964 in Sheffield, Yorkshire, England, is a classical soprano in concert and opera, and a teacher and conductor. She has British and German nationalities and has been living in Berlin since 1996.

== Biography ==
York studied piano from the age of six with Avis Benn and studied singing from the age of nine with Greta Rawson in Sheffield. Whilst at Aston Comprehensive School she studied percussion with Len Addy, playing in Rotherham Youth Orchestra and Killamarsh Silver Band. At the age of 16 she began singing lessons with Jean Allister in Leeds. She studied musicology at the University of Manchester, graduating with a First Class Honours Degree. She then went on to study singing for 1 year in London at the Guildhall School of Music and Drama with Laura Sarti, after which she worked privately with Janice Chapman in London.

Her operatic career began with Mozart, singing Servilia for Glyndebourne Touring Opera and Barbarina at Covent Garden under Bernard Haitink. She then sang Donizetti at Covent Garden and for the Glyndebourne Festival Opera she premiered the role of Mirror in Harrison Birtwistle’s The Second Mrs Kong. She has appeared regularly at the Berlin State Opera and Bavarian State Opera. Her portrait of Anne Truelove in Stravinsky’s The Rake's Progress , recorded for Deutsche Grammophon with the London Symphony Orchestra and John Eliot Gardiner, was awarded a Grammy Award. Her recording of Mendelssohn's A Midsummer Night's Dream with Claudio Abbado and the Berlin Philharmonic, The Last Concert, won the International Classical Music Award best orchestral category 2017.

She took part in the project of Ton Koopman to record the complete vocal works of Johann Sebastian Bach with the Amsterdam Baroque Orchestra & Choir.
