= Alasdair Elliott =

British operatic tenor

Alasdair Elliott (born 18 July 1954) is a British operatic tenor. With The Royal Opera, Elliott sang the role of Emperor Altoum in Puccini's Turandot in 2014.

Elliott was born in Hamilton, Scotland, and studied at the Royal Scottish Academy of Music and Drama and Guildhall School. In London he was a pupil of Laura Sarti. He was then at the Britten–Pears School.
