= Barbara Zechmeister =

German opera singer

- Education: Musikhochschule Heidelberg
- Occupations: Operatic soprano; Voice teacher
- Organizations: Oper Frankfurt; Dr. Hoch's Konservatorium
- Awards: Kammersängerin

Barbara Zechmeister (born in Bad Mergentheim) is a German operatic soprano and voice teacher. A member of the Oper Frankfurt from 1996, she has appeared in major European opera houses and international festivals. She has performed in world premieres, and in recitals and recordings. Zechmeister has been a voice teacher at Dr. Hoch's Konservatorium since 2005.

== Career ==
Zechmeister studied at the Staatliche Hochschule für Musik Heidelberg/Mannheim, first music pedagogy with main subjects piano and voice, then for special exams in lied, concert and opera, and finally for the concert exam (Konzertexamen) with Eva-Maria Molnár and Rudolf Piernay. She took master classes with Judith Beckmann, Agnes Giebel, Geoffrey Parsons, Laura Sarti and Kurt Widmer.

She has been a member of the Oper Frankfurt from 1996 when Sylvain Cambreling engaged her. She made her debut there as Laura in Verdi's Luisa Miller, followed by many Mozart roles such as Barbarina in Le nozze di Figaro, Zerlina in Don Giovanni and Despina in Così fan tutte. She took part in world premieres at the house, in 2006 as Livia in Detlev Glanert's Caligula, and in 2014 as one of the Sirens in Rolf Riehm's Sirenen. In 2019, she appeared as Graumann's wife in a new production of Franz Schreker's Der ferne Klang, staged by Damiano Michieletto and conducted by Sebastian Weigle. She performed the role of Mrs Gobineau in Menotti's The Medium at the Bockenheimer Depot, conducted by Nikolai Petersen.

Zechmeister appeared as a guest at opera houses including the Aalto Theatre in Essen, Staatsoper Hannover, Nationaltheater Mannheim, Staatsoper Stuttgart, in Rouen and Lisbon, and at festivals such as the Ludwigsburg Festival and the Bregenz Festival. At the 2004 Wexford Festival, she appeared as Clarissa in a recorded production of Die drei Pintos, a comic opera by Carl Maria von Weber completed by Gustav Mahler.

Zechmeister has been a teacher of voice at Dr. Hoch's Konservatorium since 2005. She was awarded the title Kammersängerin in 2011.
