= Camilla Nylund =

Finnish operatic soprano (born 1968)

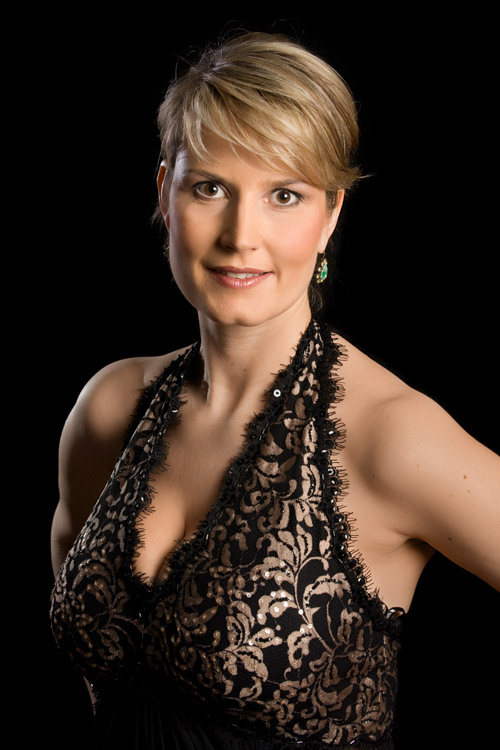
- Nylund in 2008
- Born: 11 June 1968 (age 58); Vaasa, Finland
- Education: Mozarteum University Salzburg
- Occupation: Operatic soprano
- Title: Kammersängerin
- Spouse: Anton Saris (m. 1999–present)
- Website: www.camillanylund.com

Camilla Nylund (born 11 June 1968) is a Finnish operatic soprano. She appears internationally in lyric-dramatic roles such as Beethoven's Leonore, Verdi's Elisabetta, and Wagner's Elisabeth and Sieglinde. She is especially known for portraying leading female characters in operas by Richard Strauss, (e.g. Marschallin, Arabella, Ariadne and Countess Madeleine). She has appeared at international festivals and the openings of the Dresdner Frauenkirche and the Elbphilharmonie.

== Career ==
Born in Vaasa, Finland, Nylund first studied musicology in Turku, and voice at the conservatoire. She continued her studies at the Mozarteum in Salzburg with Eva Illes. After finishing her schooling in Austria, she made her professional debut at the Finnish National Opera in Helsinki in 1996 as the Countess in Le nozze di Figaro. She was a member of the Staatsoper Hannover ensemble from 1995-1999, singing roles such as Countess (Le nozze di figaro), Pamina (Die Zauberflöte), Fiordiligi (Così fan tutte), Marie (Die verkaufte Braut), Agathe (Der Freischütz), Eva (Meistersinger), Freia (Rheingold), Gutrune (Götterdämmerung), Countess (Capriccio), Lisa (Das Land des Lächelns) and Mimì (La bohème). She then joined the ensemble of the Semperoper in Dresden in 1999, where she remained until 2002, performing roles including as Countess (Capriccio), Marie (Die verkaufte Braut), Fiordiligi (Così fan tutte), Nitocris (Belshazzar), Vitellia (La clemenza di Tito), Alice Ford (Falstaff), Tatjana (Eugene Onegin), Marschallin (Rosenkavalier) and Arabella. Nylund was honoured there with the Christel-Goltz Prize - for her interpretations of Marie in Smetana's Die verkaufte Braut, Agathe in Weber's Der Freischütz, and Fiordiligi in Mozart's Così fan tutte. In the season of 2004/2005, she gained international acclaim by debuting three roles: Elisabeth in Wagner's Tannhäuser. the title role in Salome by Richard Strauss at the Cologne Opera and the title role of Beethoven's Fidelio at the Opernhaus Zürich. She appeared in the re-opening of the restored Frauenkirche in Dresden in November of 2005, performing the soprano solo in Beethoven's Missa solemnis, conducted by Fabio Luisi, alongside Birgit Remmert, Christian Elsner and René Pape.

In 2008, Nylund appeared at the Salzburg Festival for the first time, presenting the title role of Dvořák's Rusalka. She starred as Elisabeth in Wagner's Tannhäuser at the Bayreuth Festival from 2011 until 2014, and had her festival-debut as Sieglinde (Die Walküre) in 2017. In 2014, she also appeared in the title role of Ariadne auf Naxos at the Oper Frankfurt, as the Marschallin in Der Rosenkavalier at the Grand Théâtre de Luxembourg, and in the soprano part of Beethoven's Ninth Symphony at the Hollywood Bowl in Los Angeles. In January 2017, she took part in the opening of the Elbphilharmonie, performing the soprano part in Beethoven's Missa solemnis alongside Sarah Connolly, Klaus Florian Vogt and Luca Pisaroni with the Hamburger Symphoniker conducted by Jeffrey Tate. In 2018, Nylund appeared as the Countess in Capriccio at the Oper Frankfurt, staged by Brigitte Fassbaender.

In April 2018, Camilla Nylund first sang an excerpt of Tristan und Isolde alongside Jonas Kaufmann with the Boston Symphony Orchestra under Andris Nelssons at Carnegie Hall. In May 2019 she appeared as the Empress in a new production of Richard Strauss's Die Frau ohne Schatten directed by Victor Huguet at the Wiener Staatsoper. She was also awarded the title of Österreichische Kammersängerin within that time. Later that year she made her Metropolitan Opera debut as Marschallin in Der Rosenkavalier.

In the beginning of 2020, she starred in another production of Der Rosenkavalier by Andre Heller at the Berlin State Opera alongside Nadine Sierra and Günther Groissböck. During the Covid-19 pandemic Nylund continued to perform as much as possible, headlining the Lech Classic Festival in the Austrian state of Vorarlberg alongside Piotr Beczala and participating in the recording of a concert with the Wiener Symphoniker in celebration of Franz Lehar's 150th birthday.

She rejoined Heller for "André Hellers Hauskonzerte", a project aired by ORF III in November 2020 that first saw Nylund's abilities not only as a classical soprano, but within multiple other genres such as chanson, jazz and musical theatre.

2021 saw her debuts in the title roles of Janacek's Jenůfa at the Berlin State Opera as well as Puccini's Tosca in her long-awaited return to the Finnish National Opera. In June of the same year, Nylund was Artist in Residence at the newly founded Brixen Classics Festival and once again worked with André Heller on another project for ORF III, interpreting parts of The Great American Songbook with the RSO Wien and Marin Alsop.

She debuted the role of "a woman" in Schönberg's Erwartung at the Frankfurt Opera House in January 2022 and is due to make her first appearances as Isolde and Brünnhilde (Ring Cycle) at the Zürich Opera House until the end of the year.

== Recordings (selection) ==
- 2004: Ludwig van Beethoven: Fidelio (with Jonas Kaufmann and Nikolaus Harnoncourt, DVD)
- 2011: Camilla Nylund: Transfiguration - Wagner & Strauss, Arias & Scenes (with Tampere Philharmonic Orchestra, Hannu Lintu)
- 2013: Erich Wolfgang Korngold: Die Tote Stadt (DVD), (live from Finnish National Opera, with Klaus Florian Vogt)
- 2014: Christoph Willibald Gluck: Iphigenia in Aulis (conductor: Christoph Spering)
- 2014: Richard Wagner: Tannhäuser (live from the Bayreuth Festival)
- 2015: Richard Strauss: Ariadne auf Naxos (Frankfurt Opera, conductor: Sebastian Weigle)
- 2015: Richard Strauss Gala, Semperoper (with Christine Goerke, Anja Harteros, Christian Thielemann)
- 2017: Richard Strauss: Der Rosenkavalier, live from De Nederlandse Opera, Nylund as Marschallin, Hanna-Elisabeth Müller as Sophie, Paula Murrihy as Octavian, conducted by Marc Albrecht.
- 2017: Franz Lehár: Der Graf von Luxemburg (with Daniel Behle)
- 2020: Richard Wagner: "Wagner at Wahnfried"; Siegfried Idyll, Wesendonck-Lieder (Bayreuth Festival Orchestra, Christian Thielemann)
- 2022: Erich Wolfgang Korngold: Die Tote Stadt (CD), (live from Finnish National Opera, with Klaus Florian Vogt)

== Awards ==
- 1995: Lilli Lehmann Medal of the Mozarteum
- 2000: Christel-Goltz Prize
- 2008: Kammersängerin of Saxony
- 2013: Culture Prize of Sweden
- 2013: Pro Finlandia Medal of the Order of the Lion of Finland
- 2017: Beniamino Gigli Prize
- 2019: Kammersängerin of Austria
