= Oceane (opera) =

Opera by Detlev Glanert

Oceane is a 2019 opera by Detlev Glanert to a libretto by the composer and Hans-Ulrich Treichel after the uncompleted Oceane von Parceval by Theodor Fontane. Oceane, a sea spirit, becomes human to experience life on land.

== Recording ==
Live – Maria Bengtsson (as Oceane, soprano), Nikolai Schukoff (as Martin von Dircksen), Doris Soffel, Christoph Pohl, choir and orchestra of Deutsche Oper Berlin, Donald Runnicles Oehms, DDD, 2019 German-only libretto
