= Christel-Goltz Prize =

German music award

The Christel-Goltz Prize for voice has been awarded annually since 1992 until 2012 by the Foundation for the Promotion of the Semperoper. It was funded by soprano Christel Goltz.

The previous prizewinners were:

- 1993: Ute Selbig
- 1994: Kerstin Witt
- 1995: Eva Kirchner
- 1996: Jukka Rasilainen
- 1997: Roland Wagenführer
- 1998: Werner Güra
- 1999: Evelyn Herlitzius
- 2000: Camilla Nylund.
- 2001: Sophie Koch
- 2002: Klaus Florian Vogt
- 2003: Georg Zeppenfeld
- 2004: Markus Marquardt
- 2005: Christa Mayer
- 2006: Wookyung Kim
- 2007: Anke Vondung
- 2008: Christoph Pohl
- 2009: Markus Butter
- 2010: (no award)
- 2011: Carolina Ullrich
- 2012: Marjorie Owens
