= Elise Kutscherra de Nyss =

German operatic soprano

Elisa Kutscherra
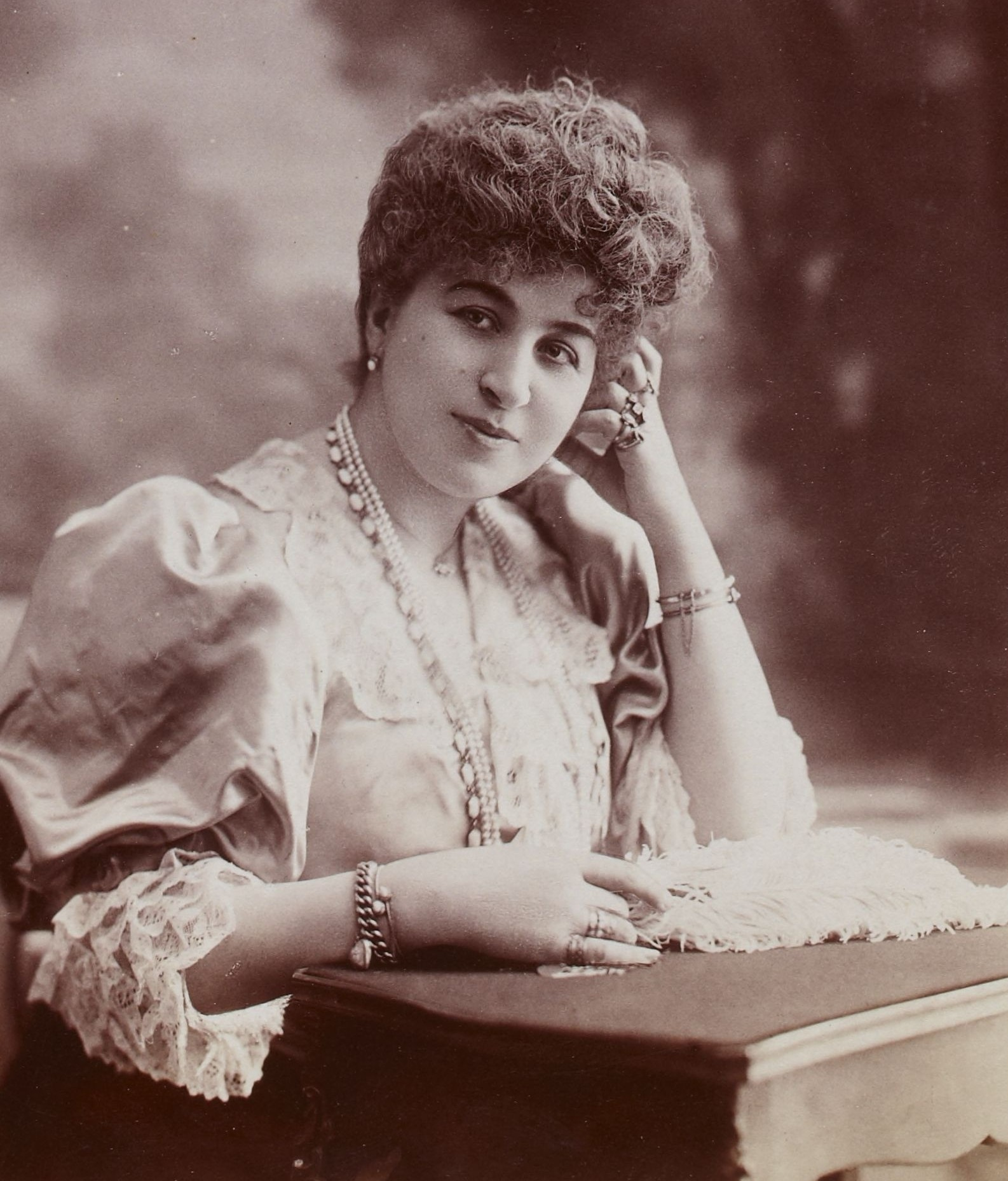

Background information
- Born: 10 June 1867 Berlin
- Died: 29 December 1945 (aged 78) Vienna
- Genres: Opera
- Spouse: Maximilien de Nys

Elise Kutscherra de Nyss (also: Kutschera, Nijs, Nys, Nysz, Nyß) (10 June 1867 – 29 December 1945) was an operatic soprano and teacher.

== Biography ==
A baptism record shows that Elise Margarethe Anna Kutschera was born in Berlin on June 10, 1865, to Joseph Heinrich Albert Kutschera and his wife Anna Carolina. Her first biography informs that she indeed was born in Berlin but two years later, in 1867. In later life, on passenger lists and naturalization records, Kutscherra herself states that she was born in Prague in 1874.

In any case, Kutscherra made her debut on July 27, 1888, in the Kroll opera in Berlin in the role of Margaretha in Faust. In 1894 she was appointed as Kammersängerin in Coburg.

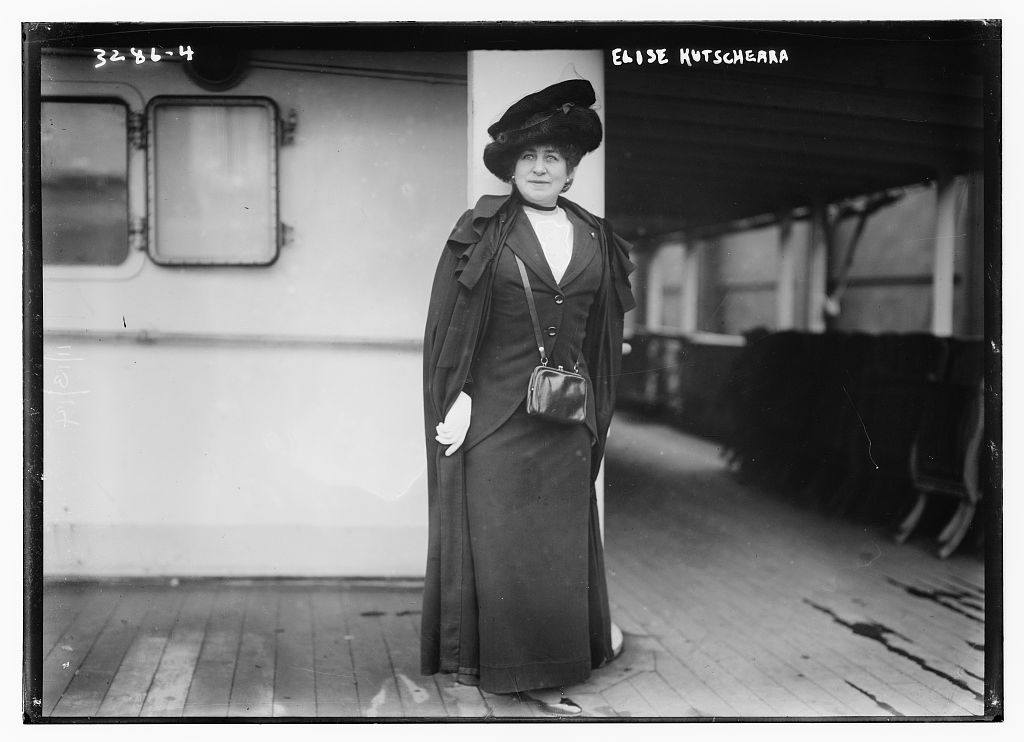
Arriving in the US in 1914

This recognition helped her to join the Damrosch Opera Company. She had her American concert debut under the direction of Walter Damrosch in 1894. In the Boston opera she was soloist in the Wagner programme. In January 1896 Kutscherra made her debut in Amsterdam.

Her Paris Opéra debut was on June 15, 1896, as Sieglinde in Wagner's Die Walküre. This was a politically noteworthy and symbolic event because Kutscherra was the first Prussian to perform on this stage since the Franco-Prussian war.

Shortly thereafter she married Maximillien de Nijs of Ostende, Belgium, established her residence in Brussels and adopted the Belgian nationality. In 1899 the couple was living in Berlin and had a daughter named Brünhilde Luisa Anna (Berlin, november 1899) who also became an opera singer under the name Hilda Nysa.

In 1914 Kutscherra performed at the Metropolitan Opera in New York City and announced that she would move her school to the United States because of World War I. In 1915, while on tour in the United States, she learned from her daughter that her husband was killed during service in the Belgian army. Kutscherra established a school in New York and in 1920 signed a declaration of intention for United States citizenship. On that document she reports that her husband was alive and living in Belgium.

The application for United States citizenship did not materialize. Some years later Kutscherra established residence in Brasil and performed in Buenos Aires. In 1927 Kutscherra returned to Europe. A death certificate in Paris shows that Maximilien Gustave Eduard Denys, husband of Elise Marguerite Anna Kutscherra, died on 4 May 1929.

Kutscherra then returned to Berlin and later moved to Vienna where she died.

=== Recordings ===
- Chansons de Marjolie by Théodore Dubois, recorded in 1913, contains the song Celui que j´aime by Kutscherra
- Victor recorded the song Heart Throb by Kutscherra in 1919.
