= Morning and Evening =

Novella by Jon Fosse

- Cover of the first edition
- Author: Jon Fosse
- Original title: Morgon og kveld
- Translator: Damion Searls
- Language: Norwegian (Nynorsk)
- Publisher: Det Norske Samlaget
- Publication date: 2000
- Publication place: Norway
- English publication date: 1 September 2015
- Pages: 115
- ISBN: 9788252156737

Morning and Evening (Nynorsk: Morgon og kveld) is a 2000 novella by the Norwegian writer Jon Fosse. It tells the story of a fisherman: the first part of the book is about his birth seen from the perspective of his father, and the second part is about his death, when he revisits important places and moments from his life. The book was published in English in 2015.

The book received the Melsom Prize. It was the basis for the 2015 opera Morgen und Abend with music by Georg Friedrich Haas.

== Reception ==
=== Critical response ===
Ole Karlsen of Dag og Tid noted how Fosse had moved on from his early works, where he merely described problems related to gaps between language and reality, to actively trying to heal the problems he identified. Karlsen wrote about Morning and Evening: "Fosse's repetitive writing style has perhaps an even more clear Biblical intention than in his last novel – and thus the text becomes charged with meaning. Yes, Fosse is rightly a poet, he can remind of Vesaas and is thus far on Vesaas' level." Publishers Weekly wrote: "Indeed, the moments throughout the novel are simple, quotidian, yet Fosse's pared down, circuitous, and rhythmic prose skillfully guides readers through past and present. In this short, gripping novel, Fosse composes a hypnotic meditation on life and death."

=== Accolades ===
The book received the 2001 Melsom Prize for best book written in Nynorsk. It was nominated for the Nordic Council Literature Prize and the Norwegian Critics Prize for Literature.
