= Michaela Kaune =

German operatic soprano

Michaela Kaune (born 1968) is a German operatic soprano.

== Life ==
Born in Hamburg, Kaune initially sang privately in various choirs. She originally wanted to study law, but then decided to study singing. She received her vocal training at the Musikhochschule Hamburg, where Judith Beckmann and Annie Schoonus were her singing teachers. In 1995, she won first prize at the Bundeswettbewerb Gesang in Berlin; in 1998, she was a prizewinner of the International Hans Gabor Belvedere Singing Competition in Vienna. In 1999, she was awarded the Otto-Kasten-Preis of the Deutscher Bühnenverein.

Kaune received her first guest engagements at the Nordharzer Städtebundtheater, at Theater Lübeck and at Theater Bremen.

Since the 1997/1998 season, she has been a permanent ensemble member of the Deutsche Oper Berlin. She made her debut there with the role of Princess Natalie in the opera Der Prinz von Homburg. There she appeared among others as Micaëla in Carmen, Pamina in the Magic Flute, Marguerite in Faust, Donna Elvira in Don Giovanni, as Contessa in Le nozze di Figaro and in the title role of the opera Arabella. In the 2007/2008 season, she appeared at the Deutsche Oper Berlin as Eva in Die Meistersinger von Nürnberg and as die Marschallin in Der Rosenkavalier. In February 2009, she sang the title role in the opera Ariadne auf Naxos.

A highlight of her career was the interpretation of the role of Eve in Wagner's Die Meistersinger von Nürnberg, which she sang at the Bayreuth Festival in 2008 and 2009.

Guest opera performances have taken Kaune to the Opéra National de Paris, the Théâtre Royal de la Monnaie in Brussels (1999/2000 season as Contessa in Le nozze di Figaro), to the Oper Frankfurt, the Théâtre Royal de la Monnaie (as Agathe in Der Freischütz), the Hamburg State Opera, the Semperoper Dresden (2001, as Fiordiligi in Così fan tutte), to the Vlaamse Opera Antwerp, the Bavarian State Opera Munich (1999, as Agathe; 2000, as Micaëla; 2002, as Donna Elvira), to the Salzburg Festival (2001, 2006), at the Berliner Festwochen and the Schleswig-Holstein Musik Festival. In the 2010/2011 season, Kaune was again a guest at the Bavarian State Opera; she took over Rosalinde in the operetta Die Fledermaus.

Since 1997, she has also made several guest appearances at the Aalto-Theater in Essen; there she sang Contessa, Fiordiligi, and in 2001, Cordelia in Lear. In 1999, she gave a guest performance at the Theater Basel as Tatjana in Eugene Onegin.

Further roles of her youthful dramatic soprano repertoire are the title roles in the operas Rusalka and Katja Kabanowa and Anna in Hans Heiling.

She was named Kammersängerin in 2011.
