= Morgen und Abend =

Opera by Georg Friedrich Haas

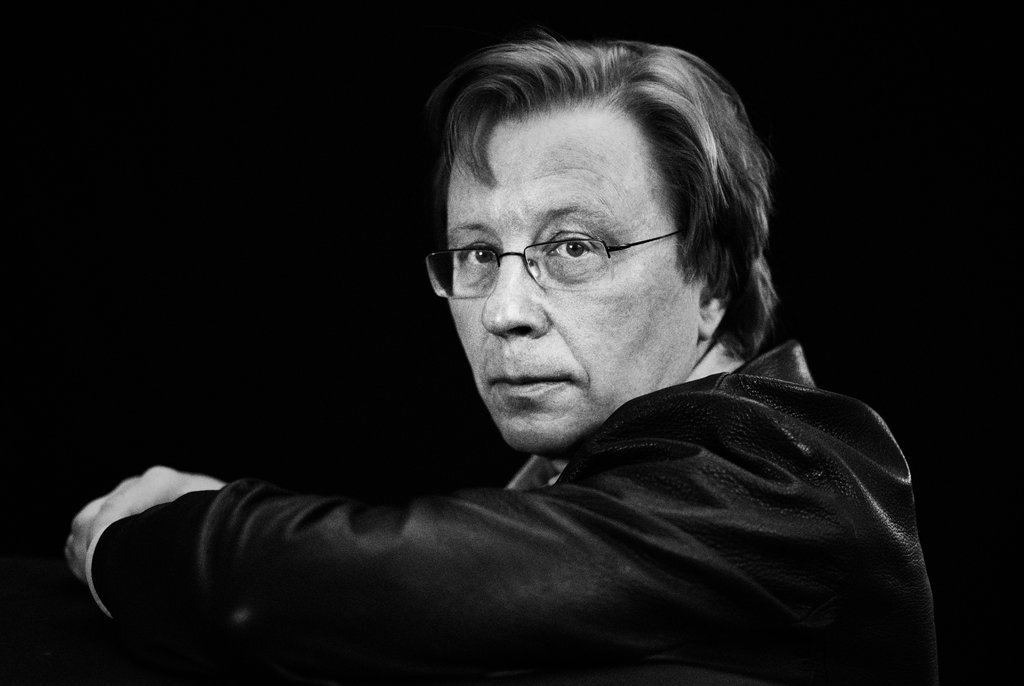
Georg Friedrich Haas in 2014

Morgen und Abend (German: Morning and Evening) is an opera by Georg Friedrich Haas to a libretto by the Norwegian writer Jon Fosse. It is based on Fosse's 2000 novel Morgon og kveld.

The opera was jointly commissioned by the Royal Opera House, London, and the Deutsche Oper Berlin. It was premiered on the main stage of the Royal Opera House on 13 November 2015. The director of the production is Graham Vick.

The composer has said "'Don't expect melodies, don't expect harmonies, just expect soundscapes". The vocal lines include microtones, including quarter-tones and sixth-tones.

== Roles ==
Role	Voice type	Premiere cast, 13 November 2015 (Conductor: Michael Boder)
Olai (father of Johannes)	spoken role	Klaus Maria Brandauer
Johannes	baritone	Christoph Pohl
Signe (Johannes's daughter)/ Midwife	soprano	Sarah Wegener
Peter (Johannes's friend)	tenor	Will Hartmann
Erna (Johannes's wife)	contralto	Helena Rasker
Chorus (offstage)		

== Synopsis ==
The opera, which lasts about 90 minutes, outlines the birth and death of a fisherman, Johannes. In the first section, Johannes's father Ollai waits for his birth, imagining what his wife and the child are experiencing, until the Nurse announces the birth has been successful and invites him to see the child. In the next section Johannes meditates on his child Signe and speaks with his friend Peter and his wife Erna, but eventually realizes that as the latter two have long since died, he himself must also be dead.

== Critical reaction ==
Richard Morrison, writing in The Times, opined that although the piece was slow to develop "By the end...I felt I was watching a very weird masterpiece". Rupert Christiansen, writing in The Daily Telegraph found the work "hypnotically beautiful yet turgidly tedious...Yet Haas’s music casts a spell...it moves like Scandinavian weather – clouds scudding, mists thickening, wind keening, thunderclaps crashing – through a glacial landscape of shimmering microtonal sound that is both precisely calibrated and eerily atmospheric". Tim Ashley, in The Guardian, felt that "beautiful though it sounds, it is weak as drama".
