= Detlev Glanert =

German opera composer

- Born: 6 September 1960 (age 66); Hamburg, Germany
- Occupation: Composer

Detlev Glanert (born 6 September 1960) is a German opera composer, who has also composed numerous works for chamber and full orchestra, including three symphonies.

== Biography ==
Detlev Glanert was born in Hamburg in 1960. He came to music late, learning his first instrument, the trumpet, at the age of eleven and not starting his formal composition studies until his twenties, when he studied under Diether de la Motte, Günther Friedrichs and Frank Michael Beyer, and then for four years under Hans Werner Henze in Cologne.

Having seen his first operas in Hamburg in 1972, The Magic Flute, and then Die Soldaten, he has said that from the first moment he loved opera. It was at Henze's invitation that Glanert produced his first sizeable piece of music-theatre, the opera Leyla und Medjun which opened the first Munich Biennale, established by Henze in 1988. Glanert then became involved in Henze's other festival, the Cantiere Internazionale d'Arte in Montepulciano as assistant co-ordinator and head of the music school from 1989 to 1993 and as artistic director from 2009 to 2011.

In 1992/93, he was a Stipendiat of the Villa Massimo in Rome.

He reached widespread attention with his 1995 opera Der Spiegel des großen Kaisers, which was awarded the Rolf-Liebermann-Preis for opera composers. The 1999 premiere of his next opera, Joseph Süss, was a notable cultural event according to Die Welt, which wrote: "The anticipation was truly enormous. Half of operatic Germany sat in the stalls of the Halle Opera House."

In 2002, Glanert was elected academician of the Freie Akademie der Künste Hamburg.

In 2006 Glanert's opera Caligula, to a libretto by Hans-Ulrich Treichel after the play by Albert Camus on the last days of the Roman emperor Caligula, was first staged at the Oper Frankfurt, conducted by Markus Stenz. A recording of this production was reviewed:

It's a scenario that Glanert could easily have depicted in sensationalist terms, but the hallmark of his score is its refinement, both in the wonderfully imaginative sound world he creates, and in the smoothly contoured vocal lines. It's an impressive achievement, and the sense of scarcely suppressed menace that pervades the work and carries unmistakable echoes of Strauss's Elektra and Salome is powerfully conjured.

He is a Fellow of the Royal Northern College of Music.

== Style ==
Glanert insists on the importance of connecting with the audience, of making them find something of themselves in the music:

"It must tell you something about your life and something about what you are. Opera has to have this principle, and so does orchestral music. If it does not, it will die."

He typically takes a traditional topos – a standard story or situation – and interprets it with a contemporary slant. In Caligula, for example, the modern twist is that the emperor is not mad but cruel entirely by choice. In Joseph Süss, the story of a Jew executed after being made a scapegoat at a secret trial over 250 years ago, the story reflects not only the Germany of 1738 but that of 1933 to 1945. The darker side of human nature is a recurring theme in Glanert's work. "I look at people as animals because sometimes they behave as animals, as you know", he said of one of his larger orchestral pieces, the Theatrum Bestiarum.

Glanert talked about his musical influences in an interview in 1996. After an initial period of three years when he submerged his own musical personality under that of Henze, he developed his own style between the contrasting poles of Gustav Mahler and Maurice Ravel – Mahler for his structural perspective, "the simple, the dramatic sense of the music", and Ravel for his surface textures, "the artificial masquerade of sounds".

== Works ==
=== Stage works ===
Title	Format	Libretto and source	Premiere
Leviathan	Chamber opera, 18'; First part of the Drei Wasserspiele trilogy	Thornton Wilder	13 May 1986, Casino, Evian (concert); 2 October 1991, Opera stabile, Hamburg (staged)
Leyla und Medjnun	Fairytale for music, 90'	Aras Ören and Peter Schneider, after the epic poem by Nizami	29 May 1988, Munich Biennale
Der Engel, der das Wasser bewegte	Chamber opera, 25'; Second part of the Drei Wasserspiele trilogy	Thornton Wilder	16 May 1995, Concordia, Theater Bremen
Der Engel auf dem Schiff	Chamber opera, 15'; Third part of the Drei Wasserspiele trilogy	Thornton Wilder	16 May 1995, Concordia, Theater Bremen
Der Spiegel des großen Kaisers	Opera in two acts, 110'	Detlev Glanert and Ulfert Becker, after the novel by Arnold Zweig.	23 November 1995, Nationaltheater Mannheim
Joseph Süß	Opera in thirteen scenes, 105'	Werner Fritsch and Uta Ackermann.	13 October 1999, Theater Bremen
Scherz, Satire, Ironie und tiefere Bedeutung	Comic opera, 110'	Jörg W. Gronius, after the play by Christian Dietrich Grabbe	2 February 2001, Opernhaus Halle
Die drei Rätsel	Opera in two acts for children and adults, 85'	Carlo Pasquini (it)	12 October 2003, Opernhaus Halle
Ich bin Rita	Intermezzo, 9'	Elke Heidenreich	15 November 2003, Yakult-Halle, Oper Köln
Caligula	Opera in four acts, 135'	Hans-Ulrich Treichel, after the play by Albert Camus.	7 October 2006, Oper Frankfurt
Nijinskys Tagebuch	For two singers, two actors, two dancers and instrumental ensemble, 95'	Carolyn Sittig, after the German translation by Alfred Frank, of the diaries by Vaslav Nijinsky.	6 April 2008, Theater Aachen
Das Holzschiff	Opera in one act, 100'	Christoph Klimke, after the novel by Hans Henny Jahnn.	9 October 2010, Staatstheater Nürnberg
Solaris	Opera, 120'	Reinhard Palm, after the novel by Stanisław Lem	18 July 2012, Bregenzer Festspiele
Oceane	Opera, 120'	Hans-Ulrich Treichel, after the unfinished novella Oceane von Parceval by Theodor Fontane	28 April 2019, Deutsche Oper Berlin

The chamber operas Leviathan, Der Engel, der das Wasser bewegte and Der Engel auf dem Schiff can be performed together as the trilogy Drei Wasserspiele.

=== Other works ===
- Symphony No. 1 (1984-5)
- Mahler/Skizze (1989)
- Symphony No. 2, for baritone and orchestra (1989-90)
- Geheimer Raum ('Secret Room'). Chamber sonata no.3 (2002)
- Theatrum Bestiarum, subtitled 'Songs and dances for large orchestra' (2005)
- Vier Präludien und Ernste Gesänge ('Four Preludes and Serious Songs', after Brahms's Vier ernste Gesänge) (2005)
- Fluß ohne Ufer ('Shoreless River') (2008)
- Einsamkeit ('Loneliness', an orchestration of the Schubert song D.620) (2010)
- Requiem für Hieronymus Bosch (2016)
- Prague Symphony (2022)

== Recordings ==
- Mahler/Skizze. London Sinfonietta / Oliver Knussen. WER 6522-2
- Theatrum Bestiarum. WDR Sinfonieorchester Köln / Semyon Bychkov. SACD AV 2137
- Caligula. World premiere recording. Oper Frankfurt / Markus Stenz. OehmsClassics OC 932
- Brahms, Johannes/Detlev Glanert: Four Preludes and Serious Songs, Helsinki Philharmonic Orchestra, Olari Elts (conductor), Ondine Records, ODE 1263-2
- Teddy Tahu Rhodes recorded Four Preludes and Serious Songs on his album Serious Songs in 2011 with the Tasmanian Symphony Orchestra under Sebastian Lang-Lessing for ABC Classics.
