= Sophie Koch =

French operatic mezzo-soprano (born 1969)

- Born: 19 February 1969 (age 56); Versailles, Yvelines, France
- Education: Conservatoire de Paris
- Occupation: Opera singer (mezzo-soprano)

Sophie Koch (born 19 February 1969) is a French operatic mezzo-soprano who made an international career, performing Rosina in Rossini's Il barbiere di Siviglia at the Royal Opera House, the Composer in Ariadne auf Naxos by Richard Strauss at the Semperoper in Dresden, and Charlotte in Massenet's Werther at the Paris Opera, among others. Octavian in Der Rosenkavalier by Richard Strauss became her signature role. She has also performed in concert and recital, and made recordings.

== Early life ==
Koch was born in Versailles. Her family is from Alsace-Lorraine, and her great-grandfather was German. Koch became interested in music at an early age. She started playing the piano at the age of 7, studied it for 15 years and also sang in a choir. She began performing in operas at age 11.

After obtaining the baccalaureate, she prepared for a diplôme d'études universitaires générales (DEUG) in literature, communication and language sciences, then hypokhâgne. Following her failure at the audition to join the Sorbonne choir, and her meeting with Christa Ludwig, she became motivated to sing. At the age of 21, she entered Jane Berbié's class at the Conservatoire de Paris, from which she earned a First Prize diploma. She also won first prize in the International Vocal Competition 's-Hertogenbosch in 1994 and was awarded the Christel-Goltz Prize by the Semperoper in Dresden in 2001. Her mastery of the Italian and English languages is precious to her, although she sings mainly in French and German.

Koch is currently married and has a daughter.

== Career ==
In the 1997/98 season, Michel Glotz arranged an audition for Koch at the London Royal Opera House, where she appeared as Rosina in Rossini's Il barbiere di Siviglia and as Dorabella in Mozart's Così fan tutte, which brought her international recognition. She appeared as Octavian in Der Rosenkavalier by Richard Strauss at the Vienna State Opera in 1999, which became her signature role. She performed another trousers role by Strauss, the Composer in his Ariadne auf Naxos at the Semperoper in Dresden. She appeared at the Bayerische Staatsoper in Munich as Zerlina in Mozart's Don Giovanni. She performed at the Teatro Real in Madrid, La Scala in Milan, the Opéra de Monte-Carlo, the Deutsche Oper Berlin, and the Salzburg Festival, where she made her debut as Zerlina in 2000.

In 2010, the Paris Opera invited her to perform Charlotte in Massenet's Werther alongside Jonas Kaufmann in the title role. In concert performances of Bellini's Norma at the Opéra de Nice and Salle Pleyel in Paris in December 2011, she appeared as Adalgisa alongside Edita Gruberová in the title role.

In Wagner stage works, Koch appeared as Venus in Tannhäuser at the Opéra Bastille in 2011. She was also Fricka there in Das Rheingold and Die Walküre, and Waltraute in Götterdämmerung. She performed the title role of Gluck's Alceste in 2013, conducted by Marc Minkowski, alongside Yann Beuron and Roberto Alagna. She made her debut at the Metropolitan Opera in New York City in the 2014 season, again as Charlotte alongside Kaufmann in Werther.

In 2015 she performed the leading role of Sélika in the original version of Meyerbeer's L'Africaine, entitled Vasco da Gama, at the Deutsche Oper Berlin.

== Recordings ==
=== CDs ===
- Lieder by Schubert and Wolf, label: Chants du monde
- Mélodies by Fauré, Chausson and Respighi, label: Chants du monde
- Lieder by Richard Strauss
- Manon (Javotte) EMI
- Laurent Petitgirard: Joseph Merrick dit Elephant man (as Eva Lückes).

=== DVDs ===
- Mozart: Don Giovanni (Zerlina), Schwetzingen Festival), 1998 Legato
- R. Strauss: Ariadne auf Naxos (Composer), Semperoper, 1999 Arthaus
- Gounod: Faust, 2004 EMI
- Mozart: Così fan tutte (Dorabella), Salzburg Festival, 2006 Deutsche Grammophon
- R. Strauss: Der Rosenkavalier (Octavian), Baden-Baden Festival, 2009 Decca
- Massenet: Werther (Charlotte), Paris, 2010 Decca
- Werther, Paris Opera, Paris, 2010 (live)
- Ariadne auf Naxos, Baden-Baden, 2013 Decca Deutsche Grammophon
- Poulenc: Dialogues des Carmélites, Paris, 2013 Erato Records
- Der Rosenkavalier, Salzburg Festival, 2014 C Major
