= Hans Rössling =

German operatic bass (1927–2013)

Hans Rössling (17 December 1927 – 6 July 2013) was a German operatic bass.

== Life ==
Rössling grew up in Mannheim-Sandhofen, trained as a municipal civil servant and took singing lessons with Heinrich Hölzlin. In 1950, he appeared for the first time in a small role in the Die Meistersinger von Nürnberg as a guest at the Mannheim National Theatre. After participating in the Nuremberg singing competition "Meistersinger-Wettstreit" in 1952, he was engaged at the Staatsoper Stuttgart. In 1953, he moved to the Mannheim National Theatre. The then artistic director Hans Schüler had noted at the audition: "Nice guy with a sense of humour, tall, slim, even bigger voice as he matured". He was a member of the ensemble of the National Theatre for almost four decades until his retirement in 1990. In 1979, Herbert Meyer described him as "always a reliable support in the second row of basses, occasionally in leading roles". After 1990, numerous guest appearances in Mannheim followed, but in 1995 he made his final stage farewell. Rössling last lived in Heddesheim. At his death in Mannheim aged 85, he left behind his wife and two children.

== Honours ==
In 1988, Rössling was appointed a Baden-Württemberg Kammersänger in recognition of his artistic merits and his services as a staff representative. In 1991, he became honorary member of the Mannheim National Theatre.
