= Wilma Schmidt =

German operatic soprano (1938–2022)

- Born: 27 June 1926; Germany
- Died: 18 June 2022 (aged 95); Hanover, Lower Saxony, Germany
- Occupation: Operatic soprano
- Organizations: Staatsoper Hannover
- Title: Kammersängerin

Wilma Schmidt (27 June 1926 – 18 June 2022), also known as Wilma Schmidt-Liebethal, was a German operatic soprano. She performed for five decades in leading roles at the Staatsoper Hannover, and appeared as a guest at other opera houses and the Bayreuth Festival. Her broad repertoire included the Countess in Mozart's Figaro, Agathe in Weber's Der Freischütz, Elisabetta in Verdi's Don Carlo alongside Hans-Dieter Bader, Elisabeth in Wagner's Tannhäuser, and her favourite role, the Marschallin in Der Rosenkavalier by Richard Strauss.

== Career ==
Schmidt was born on 27 June 1926. She was trained by Laurenz Hofer as a spinto soprano (jugendlich-dramatischer Sopran).

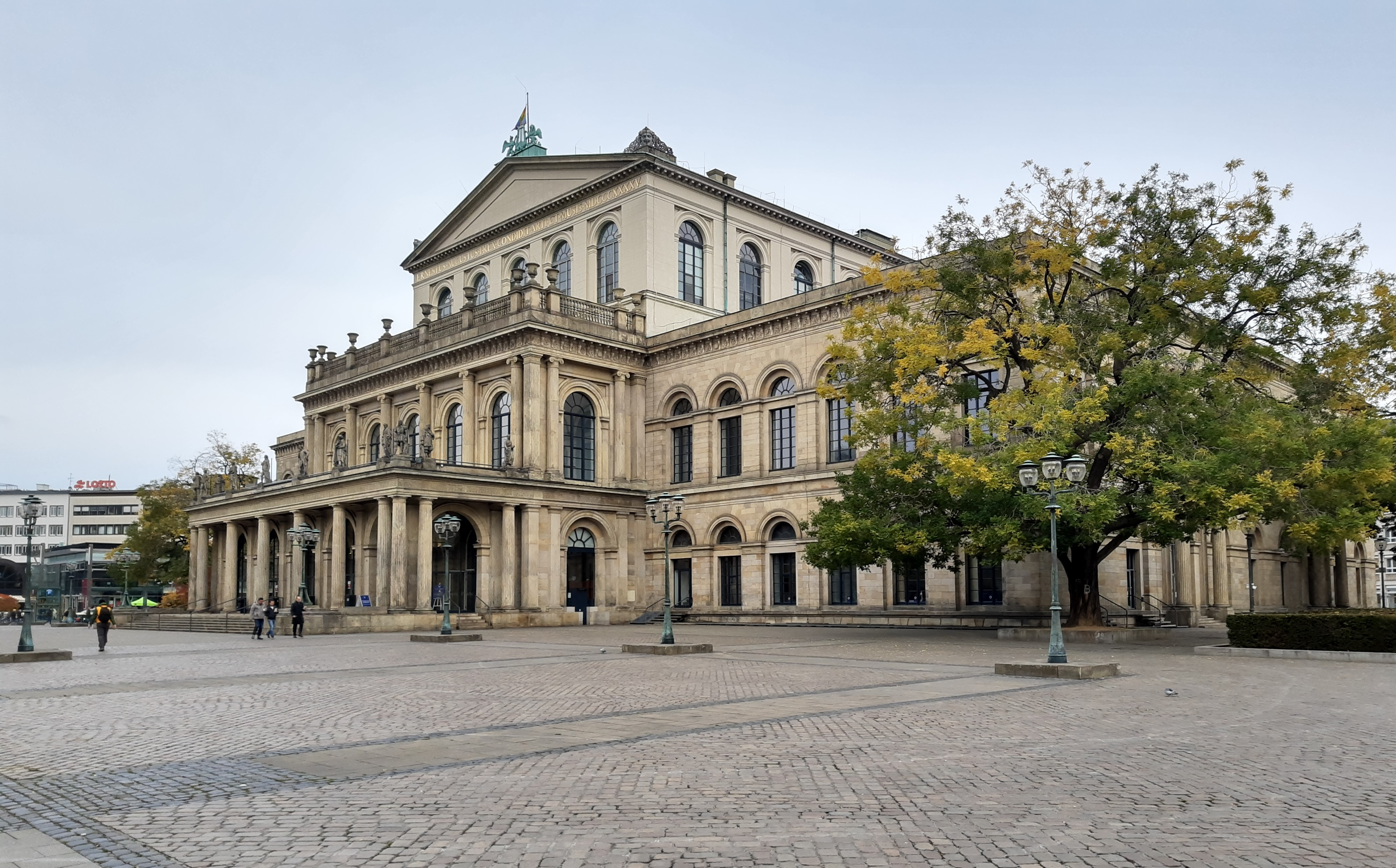
Staatsoper Hannover

She was engaged at the Staatsoper Hannover from 1949, when the main opera house was destroyed by bombing and performances took place in Herrenhausen. With colleagues, she took part in raising money for the rebuilding of the house, in theatre costumes. She soon performed major roles of a wide repertoire in opera and operetta. Colleagues of the first decades at the house after rebuilding were Marie-Louise Gilles, Gerhard Faulstich and Siegfried Haertel. Her roles, from German, Italian and Slavic opera, included the Countess in Mozart's Figaro, Elisabeth in Wagner's Tannhäuser, and her favourite role, the Marschallin in Der Rosenkavalier by Richard Strauss. She appeared also as Fiordiligi in Mozart's Così fan tutte, Donna Elvira in Don Giovanni, the title role of Beethoven's Fidelio, and Agathe in Weber's Der Freischütz. She portrayed Wagner's Eva in Die Meistersinger von Nürnberg and Sieglinde in Die Walküre. Italian roles included Verdi's Amelia in I masnadieri, Leonora in La forza del destino, Elisabetta in Don Carlo, alongside Hans-Dieter Bader in the title role, and Alice in Falstaff, and Puccini's Manon Lescaut and Giorgetta in Il tabarro. Slavic characters included Tchaikovsky's Tatjana in Eugen Onegin and Janáček's Jenůfa. More recently composed operas roles were Katharina in Der Widerspänstigen Zähmung by Hermann Goetz, and the Duchess of Parma in Busoni's Doktor Faust. She also performed in operetta, such as Rosalinde in Die Fledermaus by Johann Strauss.

In 1961, she appeared at the Bayreuth Festival as Freia in Das Rheingold, as Ortlinde in Die Walküre and as Gutrune in Götterdämmerung, directed by Wolfgang Wagner and conducted by Rudolf Kempe. A reviewer, comparing 30 recordings of the Ring cycle, regarded Kempe's version as one of the best, with singers including James Milligan as Wotan, Fritz Uhl as Siegmund, Régine Crespin as Sieglinde, and Herold Kraus as Siegfried. Schmidt's guest appearances included the Staatsoper Nürnberg from 1968, the Hungarian State Opera in Budapest in 1972, and the Staatsoper Berlin where she appeared as the Marschallin in 1975.

Schmidt was honoured with the title Kammersängerin. She retired from the stage in 1999, on the occasion of her 50th anniversary at the house, and kept performing as a guest even afterwards, including speaking roles.

== Private life ==
Schmidt-Liebethal was married; the couple had three children. She appeared under her maiden name until her official retirement, but occasionally used her married name afterwards.

Schmidt died in Hanover on 18 June 2022 at the age of 95.
