= Karl-Josef Hering =

German opera singer (1929–1998)

Karl-Josef Hering (14 February 1929 – 20 May 1998) was a German opera singer (tenor). In the 1960s and 1970s, he was one of the most sought-after hero tenors worldwide.

== Biography ==
Born in Westönnen, Werl, Westphalia, as the son of a furniture manufacturer, Hering had his first musical appearances during his high school days at the Mariengymnasium in Werl. He studied economics to join his parents' business. After the commercial diploma exam in Cologne in 1955, he studied singing with Frederick Husler, Franz Völker and Max Lorenz.

He made his debut in 1958 in Hanover, where he progressed from the First Prisoner in Fidelio to Florestan, the hero of Beethoven's opera. In 1964, he moved to Krefeld and in 1966 to Berlin, where one of his earlier roles was Max in Der Freischütz. Hering had been a permanent member of the Deutsche Oper Berlin from 1966 to 1979 and was named Berliner Kammersänger in 1975 for his long-standing international achievements.

As a Wagner singer, he appeared as Siegfried, Siegmund, Parsifal, Tristan, Stolzing, Erik but also as Max, Canio, Florestan, Bacchus, and others in addition to German theatres such as Hamburg, Frankfurt, Düsseldorf, Stuttgart, Berlin State Opera worldwide in London, Vienna, Amsterdam, Rome, Paris, Los Angeles, Tokyo, Buenos Aires, Toronto, etc., with conductors such as Sir Georg Solti, Eugen Jochum, Karl Böhm, Zubin Mehta, Horst Stein, Lorin Maazel, Erich Leinsdorf, Joseph Keilberth, and Silvio Varviso.

He appeared in a speaking role in the 1984 film Schneeweißchen und Rosenrot, an adaptation of the fairy tale "Snow-White and Rose-Red".

In the late 1970s, a hip joint disease forced the singer to give up his active stage career. Since then he worked as a hotelier with businesses on the island of Fehmarn, in the Hochsauerland and most recently in Berlin.

Karl-Josef Hering was buried in the Waldfriedhof Zehlendorf in Berlin Nikolassee.
