= Caligula (play) =

1944 play by Albert Camus

Caligula is a play written by Albert Camus, begun in 1938 (the date of the first manuscript is 1939) and published for the first time in May 1944 by Éditions Gallimard. It premiered on 26 September 1945 at the Théâtre Hébertot in Paris, starring Gérard Philipe (Caligula), Michel Bouquet and Georges Vitaly and was directed by Paul Œttly. The play was later the subject of numerous revisions. It is part of what Camus called the "Cycle of the Absurd", together with the novel The Stranger (1942) and the essay The Myth of Sisyphus (1942). A number of critics have reported the piece to be existentialist, though Camus always denied belonging to this philosophy. Its plot revolves around the historical figure of Caligula, a Roman Emperor famed for his cruelty and seemingly insane behavior.

== Plot ==
The play depicts Caligula, Emperor of Rome, torn by the death of Drusilla, his sister and lover. In Camus' version of events, Caligula eventually deliberately manipulates his own assassination. (Historically, Caligula's assassination took place on January 24, AD 41.)

Albert Camus wrote of his piece, "Caligula, a seemingly kind prince, realises upon the death of Drusilla (his sister and his mistress) that men die and they are not happy. Obsessed by the quest for the Absolute and poisoned by contempt and horror, he tries to exercise through murder and systematic perversion of all values, a freedom, which he discovers in the end is not truly freedom. He rejects friendship and love, simple human solidarity, good and evil. He takes the word of those around him, he forces them to logic, he levels all around him by force of his refusal and by the rage of destruction which drives his passion for life."

He continues, "But if his truth is to rebel against fate, his faculty is to oppose, and deny other men. One cannot destroy, without destroying oneself. This is why Caligula depopulates the world around him and, true to his logic, makes arrangements to arm those who will eventually kill him. Caligula is the story of a superior suicide. It is the story of the most human and the most tragic of errors. Unfaithful to man, loyal to himself, Caligula consents to die for having understood that no one can save himself all alone and that one cannot be free in opposition to other men."

== Versions of Caligula ==
The final version is the four-act version of 1944, first published jointly with The Misunderstanding then published alone in the same year. There is a three-act version of 1941, re-published in 1984, in the compilation Cahiers Albert Camus. The changes between the versions show the effect of World War II on Camus. The play is the basis for the 2006 German-language opera of the same name by Detlev Glanert.
