= Kammersänger =

Honorific title

Kammersänger (male; German: [ˈkamɐˌzɛŋɐ]) or Kammersängerin (female; German: [ˈkamɐˌzɛŋəʁɪn]), abbreviated Ks. or KS, is a German honorific title for distinguished singers of opera and classical music. It literally means "chamber singer". Historically, the title was bestowed by princes or kings, when it was styled Hofkammersänger(in), where Hof refers to the royal court.

The title is given in Germany and in Austria usually on the recommendation of relevant national and local institutions. In East Germany, some concert halls bestowed this designation.

Similar titles are Kammerschauspieler, Staatsschauspieler, Kammermusiker, Kammervirtuose, Kammertänzer and Kammerkomponist/Kammerkompositeur.

== Titles and recipients ==
=== Austria ===
Österreichischer Kammersänger / Österreichische Kammersängerin

The honorary title is awarded by the Federal President of Austria on the proposal of the responsible Federal Minister since 1971.

- Category:Österreichischer Kammersänger (133)

=== Germany ===
- Lilli Lehmann (1876)
- Elise Kutscherra de Nyss (Coburg, 1894)
- Gerhard Unger (1952)
- Theo Adam (1955)
- Anny Schlemm (Frankfurt, 1963)
- Sigrid Kehl (Leipzig, 1963)
- Hans-Dieter Bader (Hanover, 1981)
- Alfred Vökt (Frankfurt, 1989)
- Günter Wewel (Dortmund, 1989)
- Hermann Becht (1992)
- Margit Neubauer (Frankfurt, 1993)
- Carlos Krause (Frankfurt, 1993)
- Axel Köhler (Halle, 1998)
- Klaus Schneider (Karlsruhe, 2003)
- Linda Watson (Düsseldorf, 2004)
- Doris Soffel (Cologne, 2007)
- Hans-Otto Weiß (Mainz, 2010)
- Eike Wilm Schulte (Wiesbaden, 2010)
- Winfrid Mikus (Heidelberg, 2011)
- Roland Hartmann (Meiningen, 2011)
- Barbara Zechmeister (Frankfurt, 2011)
- Romelia Lichtenstein (Halle, 2012)
- Hannes Brock (Dortmund, 2012)
- Jörg Sabrowski (Kiel, 2012)
- Heike Wittlieb (Kiel, 2012)
- Thomas de Vries (Wiesbaden, 2014)
- Jochen Kupfer (Nürnberg, 2016)
- Thomas Jesatko (Mannheim, 2016)
- Máté Sólyom-Nagy (Erfurt, 2017)
- Tomohiro Takada (Kiel, 2017)
- Jeffrey Dowd (Essen, 2019)
- Claudia Mahnke (Frankfurt, 2021)
- Christina Clark (Essen, 2022)
- Marie-Helen Joël (Essen, 2022)
- Rainer Maria Röhr (Essen, 2022)
- Wilfried Staber (Heidelberg, 2022)
- Samuel Youn (Cologne, 2022)
- Morgan Moody (Dortmund, 2023)
- Carmen Fuggiss (Hanover, 2023)
- Frank Schneiders (Hanover, 2023)
- Jürgen Rust (Mainz)
- Wilma Schmidt (Hanover)
- Vilma Fichtmüller
- Ute Walther (Berlin?)
- Peter-Christoph Runge (Düsseldorf)

=== Berlin ===
Berliner Kammersänger / Berliner Kammersängerin

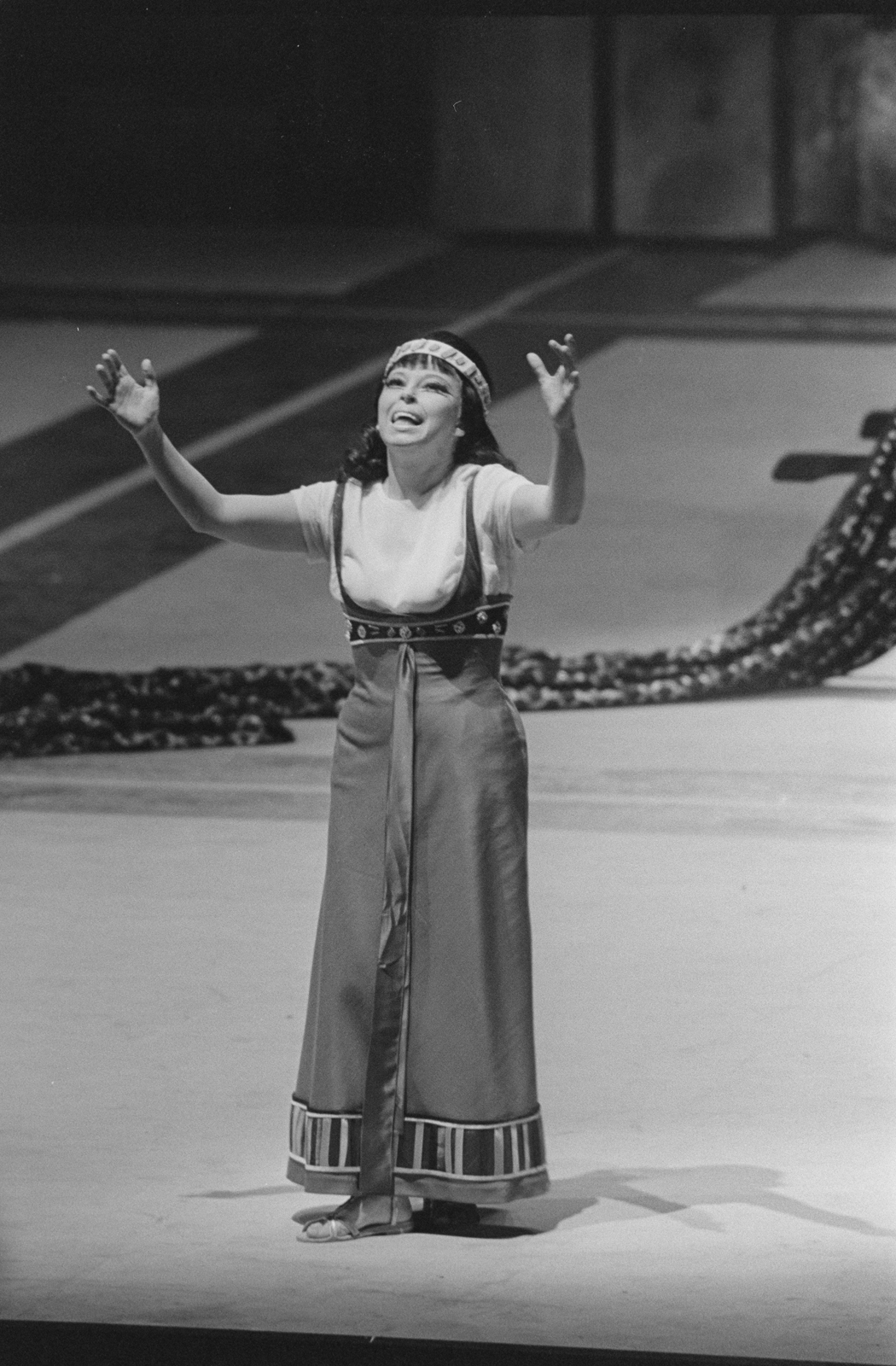
KS Sylvia Geszty as Cleopatra in Handel's Giulio Cesare, Berlin, 1970

The honorary title has been given by the Senate of Berlin since 1962. In the reunified Berlin, from 1990 to 2010, 17 singers have received this honor.

- Dietrich Fischer-Dieskau (1963)
- Sieglinde Wagner (1963)
- Sylvia Geszty (1968)
- Peter Lagger (1970)
- Erika Köth (1970)
- Ingvar Wixell (1970)
- Barry McDaniel (1970)
- Vera Little (1970)
- Gundula Janowitz (1974)
- José van Dam (1974)
- Karl-Josef Hering (1975)
- Catarina Ligendza (1976)
- Siegfried Lorenz (1979)
- Hans-Martin Nau (1983)
- Uta Priew (1984)
- Jochen Kowalski (1994)
- Karan Armstrong (1994)
- Matti Salminen (1995)
- George Fortune (1995)
- Andreas Conrad (1998)
- René Pape (2000)
- Roman Trekel (2000)
- Peter Maus (2001)
- Christiane Oertel (2003)
- Clemens Bieber (2010)
- Reinhard Hagen (2010)
- Lenus Carlson (2010)
- Michaela Kaune (2011)
- Brigitte Geller (2012)
- Peter Renz (2012)
- Jens Larsen (2013)
- Peter Seiffert (2014)
- Dorothea Röschmann (2016)
- Victor von Halem (2016)
- Kwangchul Youn (2018)
- Karolina Gumos (2022)
- Günter Papendell (2022)
- Caren van Oijen (2022)
- Tom Erik Lie (2022)
- Evelyn Lear
- Ernst Haefliger
- Walter Dicks
- Werner Enders
- Erich Witte
- Celestina Casapietra

=== Bavaria ===
Bayerischer Kammersänger / Bayerische Kammersängerin

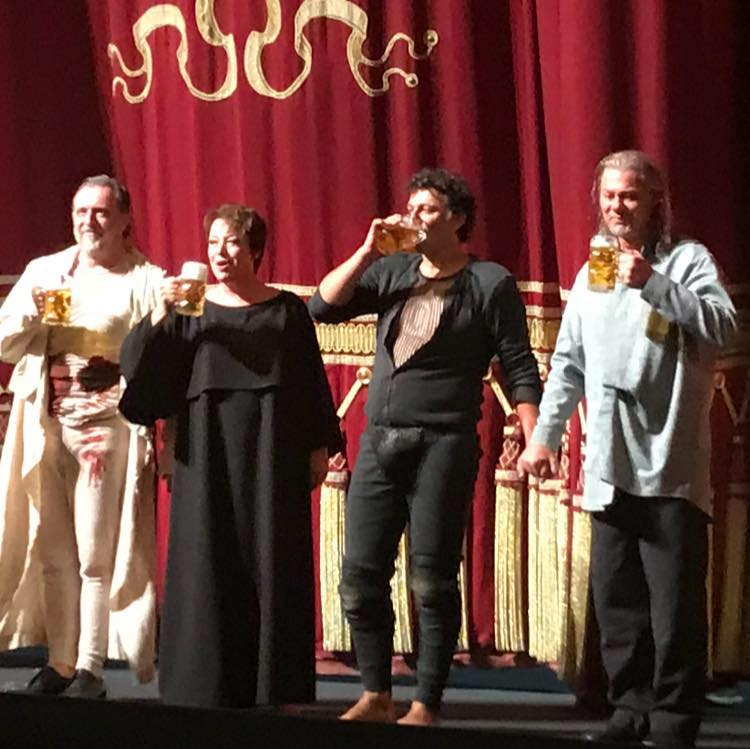
Christian Gerhaher, Nina Stemme, Jonas Kaufmann and René Pape take a Bavarian style curtain call after the final performance of Parsifal at Bayerische Staatsoper July 2018.

The title has been awarded by the Bavarian Ministry of Culture since 1955 for outstanding artistic achievements to singing soloists of the Bavarian State Opera, the Staatstheater am Gärtnerplatz and the Staatstheater Nürnberg. As of 2019, more than 130 artists have been honoured. The prerequisite is at least five years of membership in an ensemble at a state theater or regular guest appearances.

- Gottlob Frick (1954)
- Hans Hotter (1955)
- Erika Köth (1955)
- Hertha Töpper (1955)
- Leonie Rysanek (1956)
- Dietrich Fischer-Dieskau (1959)
- Fritz Wunderlich (1962)
- Kieth Engen (1962)
- Lisa della Casa (1963)
- Inge Borkh (1963)
- Astrid Varnay (1963)
- Karl-Christian Kohn
- Ingeborg Hallstein (1968)
- Birgit Nilsson (1970)
- Brigitte Fassbaender (1970)
- Gisela Ehrensperger (1974)
- Wolfgang Brendel (1976)
- Hermann Winkler (1977)
- Kurt Moll (1979)
- Júlia Várady (1979)
- Willi Brokmeier (1980)
- Edith Mathis (1980)
- Theo Adam (1980)
- Plácido Domingo (1981)
- Lucia Popp (1983)
- Hildegard Behrens (1987)
- Helen Donath (1988)
- Edita Gruberova (1989)
- Peter Seiffert (1992)
- Waltraud Meier (1996)
- Ann Murray (1998)
- Felicity Lott (2003)
- Thomas Allen (2003)
- Gabriele Schnaut (2003)
- Matti Salminen (2003)
- Vesselina Kasarova (2005)
- Anja Harteros (2007)
- Diana Damrau (2007)
- Anne Lünenbürger (2008)
- Frances Pappas (2008)
- Jonas Kaufmann (2013)
- Wolfgang Koch (2014)
- Christian Gerhaher (2015)
- Jochen Kupfer (2016)
- Anja Kampe (2018)
- Alex Esposito (2020)
- Marlis Petersen (2021)
- Wolfgang Ablinger-Sperrhacke (2021)
- Jennifer O'Loughlin (2021)
- Lucian Krasznec (2021)
- Pavol Breslik (2021)
- Bo Skovhus (2022)
- Nina Stemme (2022)
- Daniel Prohaska (2023)
- Martin Hausberg (2024)
- Gerald Finley (2024)
- Sally du Randt (2024)
- Benno Kusche

=== Hamburg ===
Hamburger Kammersänger / Hamburger Kammersängerin

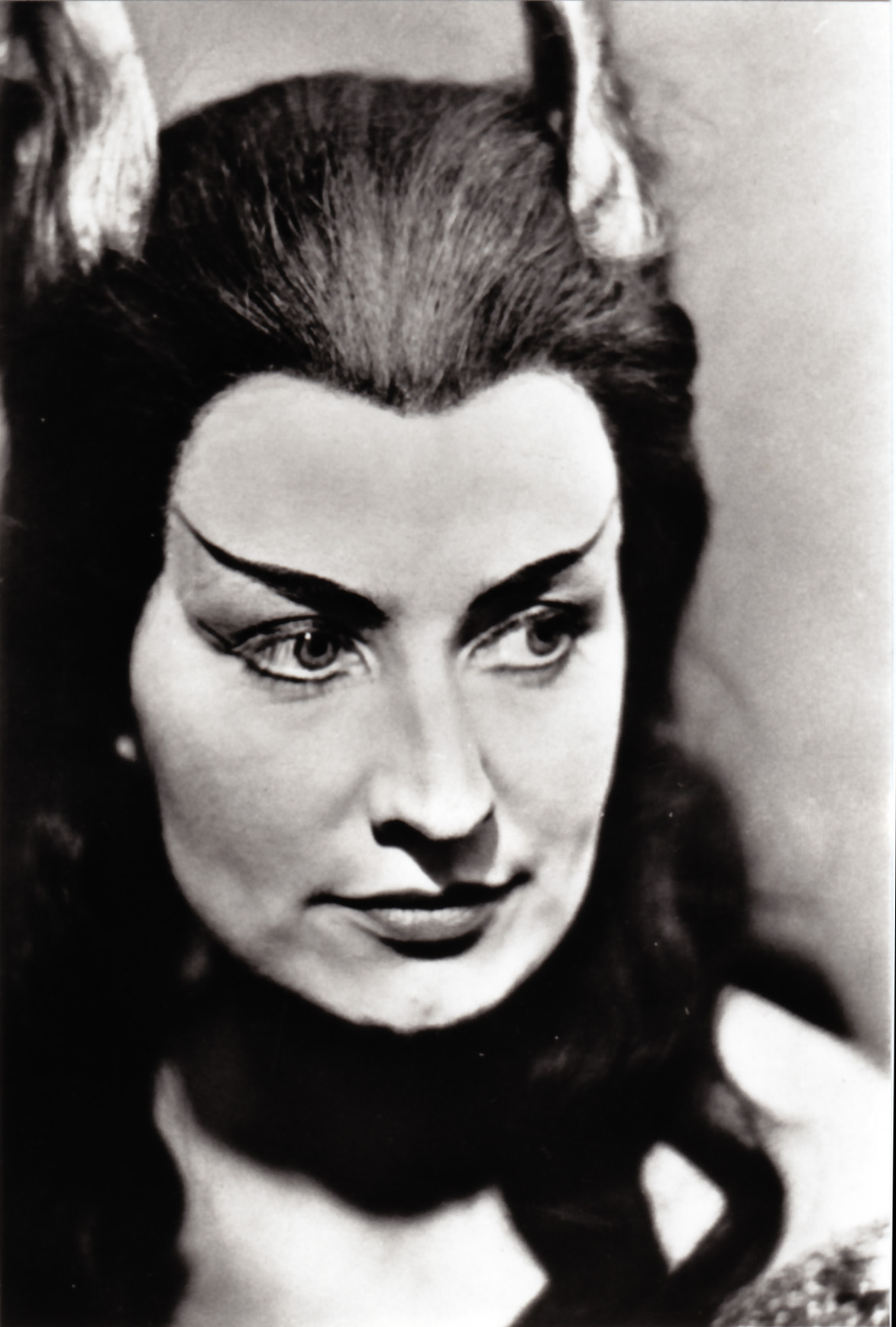
KS Ursula Boese, Waltraute from Götterdämmerung, Hamburg

Since 1961, the title has been given by the Hamburg Senate. As of 2015, it has been awarded 28 times since 1928.

- Toni Blankenheim (1961)
- Helga Pilarczyk
- Ursula Boese (1969)
- Plácido Domingo (1975)
- Kurt Moll (1975)
- Franz Grundheber (1986)
- Heinz Kruse (1988)
- Harald Stamm (1988)
- Luciano Pavarotti (1989)
- Bernd Weikl (1993)
- Gabriele Schnaut (1995)
- Andreas Schmidt (1997)
- Hellen Kwon (2011)
- Gabriele Rossmanith (2011)
- Andrzej Dobber (2015)
- Renate Spingler (2017)
- Peter Galliard (2017)
- Jürgen Sacher (2017)
- Klaus Florian Vogt (2019)
- Vida Miknevičiūtė (2024)
- Olga Peretyatko (2024)
- Christoph Pohl (2024)
- Alexander Tsymbalyuk (2024)

=== Saxony ===
Sächsischer Kammersänger / Sächsische Kammersängerin

The title has been for members of the ensembles of the Sächsische Staatsoper Dresden and the Landesbühnen Sachsen since 1998.

- Hans-Joachim Ketelsen (1985)
- Evelyn Herlitzius (2002)
- Camilla Nylund (2008)
- Georg Zeppenfeld (2015)
- Christa Mayer (2020)
- Günther Leib

=== Baden-Württemberg ===
Baden-Württembergischer Kammersänger / Baden-Württembergische Kammersängerin

- Reinhold Fritz (1917)
- Fritz Schaetzler (1930–1945)
- Wolfgang Windgassen (1951)
- Marga Höffgen (1976)
- Ursula Sutter (1977)
- Karan Armstrong (1985)
- Hans Rössling (1988)
- Erich Syri (1989)
- Martha Dewal (1993)
- Allan Evans (1996)
- Paata Burchuladze (1998)
- Hans-Günther Dotzauer (2001)
- Catriona Smith (2003)
- Simone Schneider (2016)
- Konstantin Gorny (2006)
- Yuko Kakuta (2016)
- Liang Li (2016)
- Torsten Hofmann (2016)
- Matthias Klink (2018)
- Diana Haller (2021)
- Adam Palka (2021)
- Matthias Wohlbrecht (2022)

=== Sweden and Denmark ===
The equivalent designation in Sweden and Denmark are respectively hovsångare (male) or hovsångerska (female) and kongelige kammersangere.
