= Tatjana Gsovsky =

Ballet dancer and choreographer

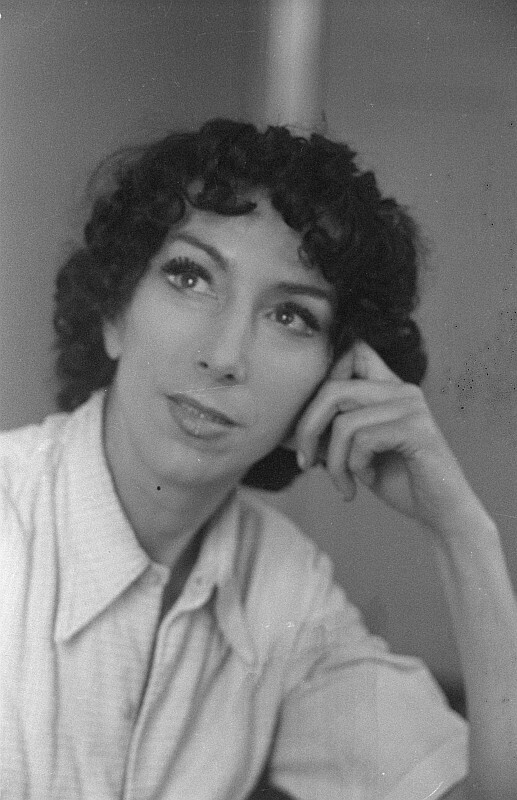
- The dancer in 1946
- Born: Tatjana Issatschenko; 18 March 1901; Moscow, Russian Empire
- Died: 29 September 1993 (aged 92); Berlin, Germany
- Resting place: Waldfriedhof Zehlendorf
- Occupations: Ballerina; Ballet mistress; Choreographer; Ballet company director
- Organizations: Berlin State Opera; Teatro Colón; Deutsche Oper Berlin; Oper Frankfurt
- Spouse: Victor Gsovsky
- Awards: Berliner Kunstpreis; Bundesverdienstkreuz; Honorary Professor; Deutscher Tanzpreis

Tatjana Gsovsky (Татьяна Васильевна Гзовская/Tatjana Wassiljewna Gsowskaja, born Issatschenko Исаченко; 18 March 1901 – 29 September 1993) was an internationally known ballet dancer and choreographer who was ballet mistress of the Berlin State Opera, Teatro Colón, Deutsche Oper Berlin and Oper Frankfurt. An influential teacher, she is remembered for first choreographies of works by contemporary composers including Boris Blacher, Werner Egk, Hans Werner Henze, Giselher Klebe, Luigi Nono and Carl Orff.

== Career ==
Tatjana Issatschenko was born in Moscow and studied there, first art history. She studied ballet in the studio of Isadora Duncan in St. Petersburg. After the October Revolution, she worked as a ballet trainer in Krasnodar, where she met her colleague Victor Gsovsky. They got married and emigrated to Berlin in 1924. From 1928 they ran a private ballet school. After World War II, she was from 1945 to 1951 the ballet mistress at the Deutsche Staatsoper (Berlin State Opera) (which was from 1949 in East Berlin), where she created a new company. From 1952 to 1953 she served in that function at the Teatro Colón in Buenos Aires, from 1953 to 1966 at the Deutsche Oper Berlin (then in West Berlin) and from 1959 to 1966 also at the Oper Frankfurt. In 1955, Gsovsky founded the Berliner Ballett, a troupe touring in Europe with modern Tanztheater on a classical base.

She died in Berlin and received an Ehrengrab (honorary grave) on the Waldfriedhof Zehlendorf.

== Work ==
Gsovsky created choreographies that dominated the dance scene in Germany for 20 years, in a synthesis of classical ballet with elements of Ausdruckstanz, including findings of psychology. She was the first to create choreographies of Hans Werner Henze's Der Idiot (Berlin, 1952), Carl Orff's Trionfo di Afrodite (Milan, 1953), Werner Egk's Die chinesische Nachtigall (Munich, 1953), Luigi Nono's Der rote Mantel (The Red Cloak, Berlin, 1954), Henri Sauguet's Die Kameliendame (Berlin, 1957), Giselher Klebe's Menagerie (Berlin, 1958), Remi Gassmann and Oskar Sala's Paean (Berlin, 1960), and Boris Blacher's Tristan (Berlin, 1965). She staged the German premieres of Prokofiev's Romeo and Juliet (Berlin, 1948) and Weill's The Seven Deadly Sins (Frankfurt, 1960). Gsovsky wrote the book Ballett in Deutschland (Berlin, 1954).

== Teacher ==
One of Gsovsky's most successful students was Natascha Trofimowa who attended her Berlin school and later danced in the ballets she choreographed at the Berlin State Opera.

== Awards ==
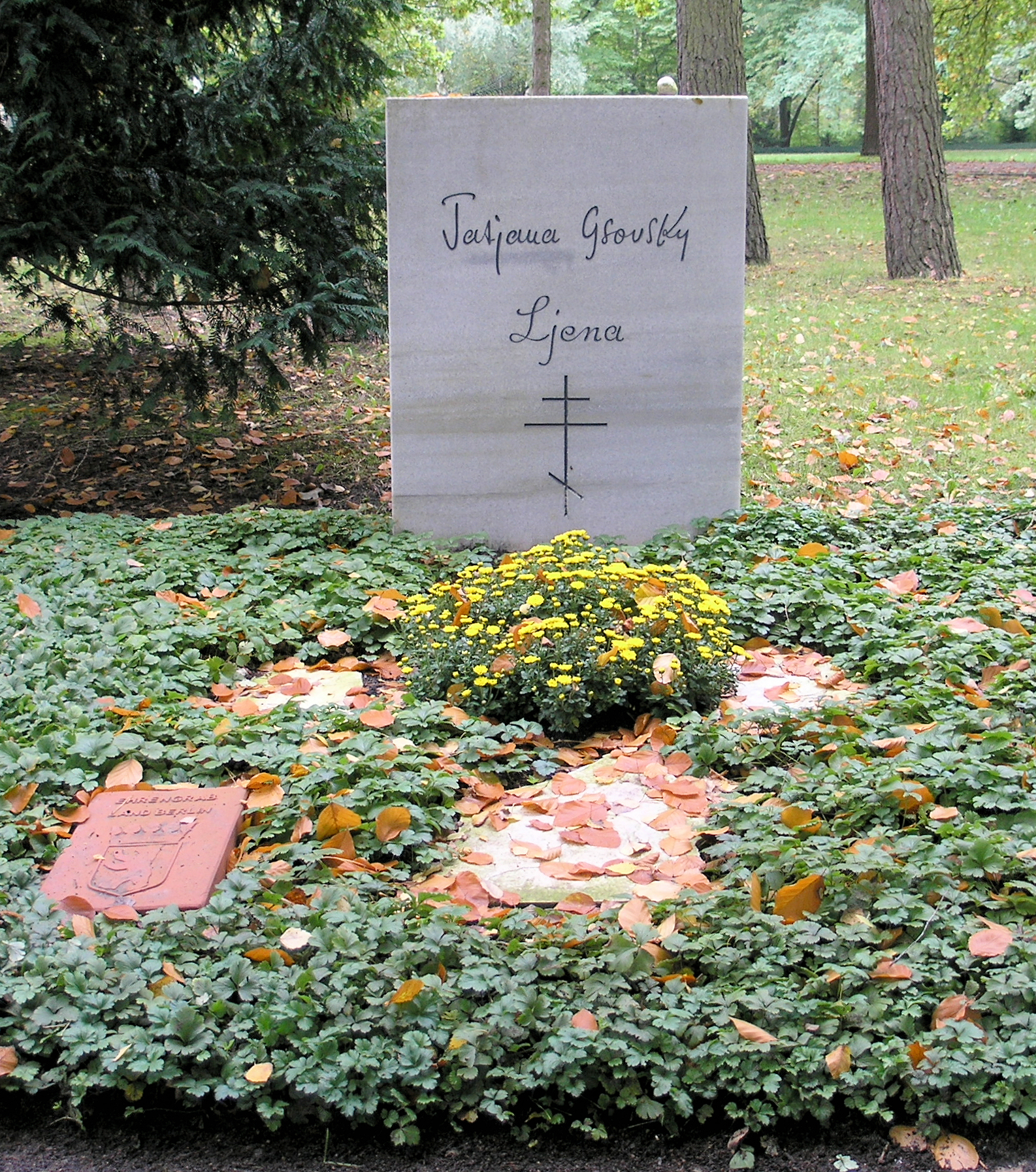
Grave on the Waldfriedhof Zehlendorf

- Berliner Kunstpreis of the Akademie der Künste (1954)
- Member of the Akademie der Künste (1955)
- Bundesverdienstkreuz (1969)
- Honorary Professor (20 May 1976)
- Deutscher Tanzpreis (1983)
- Honorary member of the Deutsche Akademie des Tanzes, Köln (1987)
- Order of Merit of Berlin (16 December 1992)

== Literature ==
- Max W. Busch (2005). Tatjana Gsovsky – Choreographin und Tanzpädagogin (in German). Berlin: Verlag Alexander. ISBN 3-89581-105-X.
- Michael Heuermann (2001). "Tatjana Gsovsky und das "Dramatische Ballett". Der "Berliner Stil" zwischen Der Idiot und Tristan : Dissertation. Fachbereich Sozialwissenschaften der Universität Bremen" (PDF) (in German).
- Michael Heuermann (2007). "Tatjana". Leben und Werk der Choreographin und Pädagogin Tatjana Gsovsky (in German). München: K. Kieser Verlag. ISBN 978-3-935456-17-3.
