= Annedore Leber =

German journalist and politician (1904-1968)

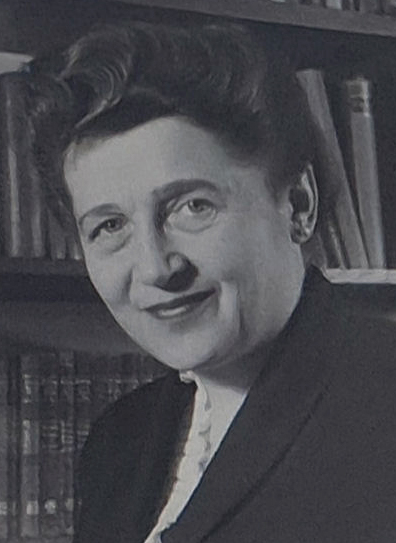
- Leber (1949)
- Born: Annedore Rosenthal; 18 March 1904; Wilmersdorf, German Empire
- Died: 28 October 1968 (aged 64); West Berlin, West Germany
- Resting place: Waldfriedhof Zehlendorf
- Political party: Social Democratic Party of Germany
- Other political affiliations: Kreisau Circle
- Movement: German resistance to Nazism
- Spouse: Julius Leber (m. 1927; died 1945)

Annedore Leber (née Rosenthal; 18 March 1904 – 28 October 1968) was a German journalist and politician who was involved in the German resistance to Nazism.

== Early life and education ==
Annedore Rosenthal was born on 18 March 1904, the daughter of school teacher Georg Rosenthal and his wife Auguste Rosenthal (née Bauch). Rosenthal herself did not attend school, and was instead homeschooled by her father. In 1922, she passed her abitur as an external pupil at either a school in Rudolstadt, or in Lübeck.

She began studying law in 1922, but did not complete her studies. Instead she worked as an apprentice in a tailor's shop, eventually passing the master's examination in 1935.

== Marriage and persecution ==
In 1927, she married Julius Leber (taking his surname) and became a member of the Social Democratic Party of Germany (SPD). The couple had two children. Julius Leber, a prominent member of the German resistance to Nazism, was imprisoned in 1933 and spent several years in various prisons and concentration camps. Annedore Leber moved with her children to Berlin and after her master's examination ran a tailor's shop while she tried to secure her husband's release.

== German resistance ==
Julius Leber was released on 5 May 1937. Reunited, the couple immediately resumed their involvement in the German resistance, making contact with members of the resistance in the Wehrmacht and the Kreisau Circle. In 1938, Leber became head of the department for sewing patterns in a publishing house. Her office was used to maintain contact between resistance members. When Julius Leber was imprisoned again in July 1944, Annedore Leber and her children were also imprisoned between August and September 1944. On 20 October 1944, Julius Leber was sentenced to death, and on 5 January 1945, he was executed.

== Post war politics and publishing ==
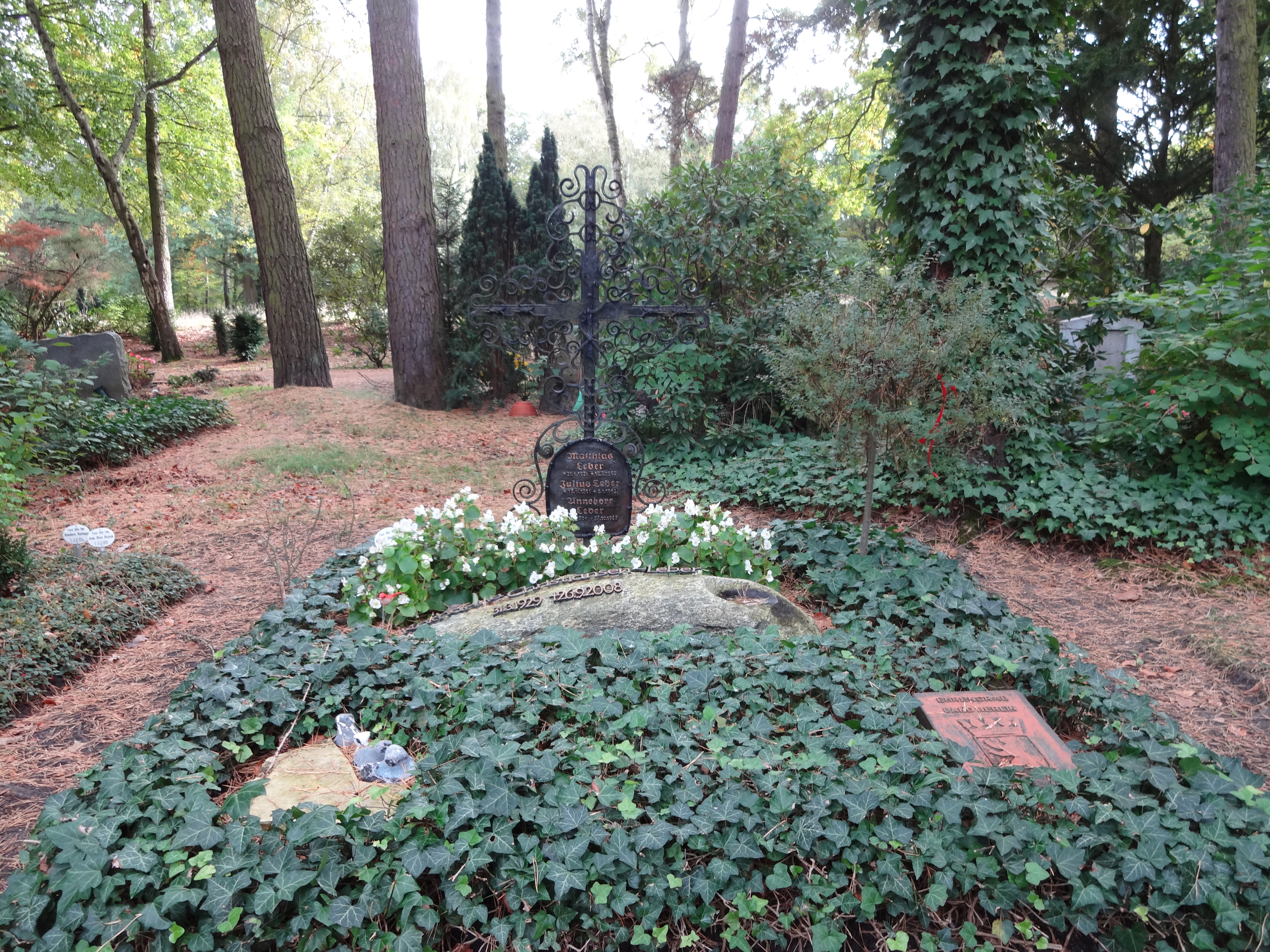
Annedore Leber's grave at the Waldfriedhof Zehlendorf cemetery

After the war, Annedore Leber became editor of a newspaper in Berlin. Her aim was to convince women to participate in German politics. To this end she founded a magazine, Mosaik, which combined coverage of traditional women's issues with political issues in order to inform and promote democratic positions. She also became involved in politics, first as head of the women's secretariat of the SPD and in 1946 as an SPD deputy in the Berlin City Council.

Around 1950, she founded the Mosaik-Verlag publishing house, which published material related to the German resistance to Nazism. She also edited texts written by her husband and published a book of short biographies about resistance members. From 1954 to 1962, she was a Member of Parliament for the district of Zehlendorf, and from 1963 to 1967, she was a member of the Abgeordnetenhaus of Berlin.

Annedore Leber died in Berlin on 28 October 1968.
