= Maria Ney =

German cabaret artist (1890–1959)

Maria Ney (August 6, 1890, in Kiel – April 7, 1959, or April 6, 1961 in West Berlin) was a German cabaret artist, film actress and accordionist.

== Biography ==
Ney was born in Kiel in northern Germany in 1890. Her father was a physician. She first studied singing at the Kiel Conservatory.

In 1933, she was reported to live in Zurich. She returned to Nazi Germany by 1936, when she was in a film.

She is buried in the Waldfriedhof Zehlendorf in Berlin.

== Career ==
=== Cabaret ===
In 1923, Ney made her debut at the Café Gößenwahn on Kürfurstendamm in Berlin. By the late 1920s, Ney was performing regularly in the "Cabaret of Comics" (Kabarett der Komiker), the longest-running German-language cabaret. She was famous enough to receive reviews in the American magazine Variety and was one of the most famous German women singers in the 1920s and 1930s.

She often performed in a sailor suit, perhaps emphasizing her nautical background from the port town of Kiel, and played the accordion. In the 1920s "A Sailor in Marseille" at the Cabaret of Comics, Ney performed with ten backup accordionists. Her performance "Give It" (Gib ihn) with Heinrich Giesen included a scene in a gondola rowed by two masked characters who seem to be in blackface.

=== Films ===
Ney served as the master of ceremonies in several short sound films that consisted of several different acts or scenes. Terra-Melophon Magazine, No. 1 (1930), which was called a "magazine film," included the reading aloud of passages from a novel, an explanation of how a telephone call between Berlin and New York worked, a demonstration of how to make a martini, and a series of exercises led by a famous physical educator.

Cabaret Program No. 6 (1931), Ufa-Cabaret Program (4th Part) (1931), Aafa Potpourri II (1932) consisted of mixtures of different cabaret acts and film studio events. The Ufa-Cabaret was produced for the film company Universum Film AG (Ufa), while the Aafa Potpourri was about Aafa-Film. These films attempted to replicate cabaret performances and atmosphere.

During the Third Reich, Ney was in two feature films: The New Cabin Boy (1936), in which she played the accordion, and Shots in Cabin 7 (1937–38). Shots in Cabin 7 was a mystery film set on board a cruise ship traveling from Cape Town to Amsterdam, in which a pair of detectives uncover a diamond smuggling ring. Ney portrayed the wife of one of the detectives, who was played by Aribert Grimmer.

=== Radio ===
Starting in 1948, Ney presented "Coffee Table" and other light programs on Rundfunk im amerikanischen Sektor (RIAS, Radio in the American Sector), the United States-sponsored radio station in Berlin.

== Filmography ==
=== Short Sound films ===
- 1926: Der sprechende Film (The Speaking Film) — as herself; documentary about sound films ("talkies")
- 1930: Terra-Melophon-Magazin Nr. 1 (Terra-Melophon Magazine, No. 1) — as master of ceremonies or narrator; directed by Rudolf Biebrach
- 1931: Ufa-Kabarett-Programm (4. Teil) (Ufa-Cabaret Program [4th Part]) — as master of ceremonies; directed by Kurt Gerron
- 1931: Kabarett-Programm Nr. 6 (Cabaret Program No. 6) — as master of ceremonies; directed by Kurt Gerron
- 1932: Aafa-Kunterbunt II (Aafa Potpourri II) — as master of ceremonies; about Aafa-Film

=== Feature films ===
- 1930: Stürmisch die Nacht (The Stormy Night) — a German and Austrian film about rum-running; directed by Kurt Blachy
- 1936: Der neue Schiffsjunge (The New Cabin Boy) — credited as "with her accordion;" directed by Hans Morschel
- 1937–1938: Schüsse in Kabine 7 (Shots in Cabin 7) — detective's wife; directed by Carl Boese

=== Made-for-TV Films ===
- 1954: Mit Musik geht alles besser (Everything is Better with Music) — as herself; documentary

== Discography ==
- circa 1980, included in Meister des Humors: das ist doch mal was anderes, a historical recording of humorists and cabaret performances
