= Anne Lünenbürger =

German operatic soprano (born 1964)

Anne Lünenbürger (born 1964) is a German operatic soprano and Bavarian Kammersängerin.

== Life and artistic work ==
=== Education and prizes ===
Lünenbürger was born in Landau in der Pfalz. Her musical career began in the Landau deanery youth choir. As a teenager she was active in the folk band "Saatkorn". She studied singing at the Karlsruhe Academy of Music with Erika Markgraf and Christiane Hampe. She attended master classes with Elisabeth Schwarzkopf, Hilde Zadek and Anna Reynolds. In 1990, she graduated with a state diploma in vocal education.

Lünenbürger won several singing competitions, including the German Music Competition in June 1992 and the VDMK State Competition for the Rhineland/Palatinate, Hesse and Saarland in October 1992. In 1993, she won the special prize in singing at the Felix Mendelssohn-Bartholdy Competition in Berlin.

=== Opera and Operettes ===
Lünenbürger had her first engagement in 1993 at the Deutsch-Sorbisches Volkstheater in Bautzen, where among others she already sang roles such as Violetta, Konstanze in Die Entführung aus dem Serail and Donna Anna in Don Giovanni.

From February 1995 to August 2008, Lünenbürger was a permanent ensemble member at the Staatstheater Nürnberg. During her permanent engagement in Nuremberg, she sang a wide range of repertoire, from the lyric coloratura soprano to the youthful dramatic soprano fach. Her most successful role was Violetta Valery in La traviata, which she sang continuously in 8 seasons in over 70 performances since the premiere in 2001. Lünenbürger's last Nuremberg role was Tatjana in Eugene Onegin in July 2008.

Lünenbürger has been freelancing since September 2008. With the title role in Salome by Richard Strauss at the Theater Aachen, she took a specialist upgrade to dramatic soprano in October 2008. Her interpretation was enthusiastically acclaimed by press and audience and was also highly acclaimed nationally.

In December 2008 and March 2009 Lünenbürger sang Lisa in the operetta Land of Smiles by Franz Lehár at the Städtische Bühnen Münster. In February 2011, she sang the role of Micaëla in the opera Carmen in a staged-concert production of the theatre Die Bühne at the Nuremberg Meistersingerhalle. In June 2013, she performed in Nuremberg's St. Klara (Nürnberg) church as a soloist in an operetta concert by the theatre Die Bühne entitled "Operetta in the Church".

=== Activity as a concert singer ===
In addition to her work as an opera singer, Lünenbürger is also active nationally as a concert singer. Her concert repertoire ranges from classical music to Romantic music and includes the modern as well. In Frankfurt in 1998 she sang the soprano part in Verdi's Messa da Requiem. In 2009 she sang the Christmas Carols op. 8 by Peter Cornelius in Fürth. Since 2011, she has appeared regularly as a soloist at concerts of the Fürth Chamber Orchestra. In February 2014, she was soloist at an operetta concert of the Fürth Chamber Orchestra in Schwaig near Nuremberg.

In November 2014, Lünenbürger performed in her hometown Landau in a concert and piano recital with romantic songs and piano pieces by Felix Mendelssohn Bartholdy, Robert Schumann and Edvard Grieg. In June 2016 Lünenbürger gave a guest performance in Landau with the programme Ja, so singt man nur in Wien .... In October 2017, Lünenbürger gave a concert entitled "Hungarian Dreams" at the Neumarkt Reitstadel.

=== Guest performances ===
Lünenbürger has had guest engagements at the Komische Oper Berlin, the Staatstheater am Gärtnerplatz in Munich and the Theater Dortmund, as well as in Prague and at the Wiener Volksoper. In 2010 she sang the title role in the opera Tosca at the Opernfestspiele Heidenheim. In 2005, she appeared as Freia and Helmwige in Richard Wagner's Der Ring des Nibelungen at a guest performance of the Nuremberg State Theatre in the People's Republic of China.

In recognition of her artistic merits Lünenbürger was appointed Bavarian Kammersänger in 2008.

=== Teaching activity ===
Lünenbürger is a lecturer in singing at the Hochschule für Musik Mainz. She leads courses in singing and voice training and passes on her knowledge to children and young people.

== Repertoire (selection) ==
- German operas: Konstanze, queen of the night and Pamina (the magic flute), Frau Fluth (The Merry Wives of Windsor), Freia (Das Rheingold), Salome, Lulu (3rd act; version by Cerha/Kloke)
- Italian operas: title role in Lucia di Lammermoor, Violetta, Mimì (La Bohème), Nedda in Der Bajazzo, Tosca
- French operas: Micaëla, Marguerite (Faust), Antonia (The Tales of Hoffmann)
- Russian operas: Tatjana (Eugene Onegin)
- Operette: Sylva Varescu (Die Csárdásfürstin), title role in Gräfin Mariza, Lisa (Das Land des Lächelns), title role in Giuditta, Julia de Weert (The Cousin from Nowhere)
