= Erich Syri =

German operatic bass (1937–2022)

- Born: 8 December 1937; Andernach, Germany
- Died: 8 September 2022 (aged 84); Lampertheim, Germany
- Occupation: Opera singer
- Years active: 1962–1999

Erich Syri (8 December 1937 – 8 September, 2022) was a German Bass opera singer.

== Life ==
Syri was born in Andernach. After initial singing lessons with Elly Lauer in Neuwied, he studied singing with Professor Clemens Glettenberg at the State University of Music in Cologne. He debuted as Sarastro in Mozart's The Magic Flute in 1962 in Passau at the Landestheater Niederbayern, a theatre in Lower Bavaria. He had his first engagement as a seriöser Bass at the Linz State Theatre from 1963 to 1966. From 1966 to 1968 he was engaged in the same position at the Theater Saarbrücken with the artistic director Hermann Wedekind and conductor Siegfried Köhler. A season followed at the Theater Freiburg in Breisgau with Hans-Reinhard Müller and Austrian conductor Leopold Hager.

In 1969 he was engaged by German conductor Horst Stein at the Mannheim National Theatre, where he worked until 1999.

Syri starred in the world premiers of Helmut Eder's s Der Kardinal in the title role, and in Giselher Klebe's s Der Jüngste Tag as Orest. He co-wrote and starred in the monodrama Die Sternstunde des Josef Bieder by Erberhard Streul.

Syri died in Lampertheim.

== Roles (selection) ==
- Pimpinone – Pimpinone (Georg Philipp Telemann)
- Baculus – Der Wildschütz (Albert Lortzing)
- Pogner – Die Meistersinger von Nürnberg (Richard Wagner)
- Hagen – Götterdämmerung (Richard Wagner)
- Fasolt – Das Rheingold (Richard Wagner)
- Fafner – Das Rheingold (Richard Wagner)
- Daland – Der fliegende Holländer (Richard Wagner)
- Graf Waldner – Arabella (Richard Strauss)
- Procolo – Viva la mamma (Gaetano Donizetti)
- King Philipp – Don Carlos (Giuseppe Verdi)
- Mephisto – Faust (Charles Gounod)
- Lothario – Mignon (Ambroise Thomas)
- Kecal the marriage broker – The Bartered Bride (Bedřich Smetana)
- Kontschak – Prince Igor (Alexander Porfirjewitsch Borodin)
- Kardinal – The Maid of Orleans (Pjotr Iljitsch Tschaikowski)
- Athlet – Lulu (Alban Berg)

== Honors ==
- 1989: Appointment as Baden-Württemberg Kammersänger by Premier Lothar Späth.
