= Caligula (Glanert) =

German-language opera by Detlev Glanert

Caligula is 2006 German-language opera by Detlev Glanert in four acts to a libretto by Hans-Ulrich Treichel, freely adapted from the 1945 play by Albert Camus. The published version by Boosey & Hawkes also includes an English version by Amanda Holden. The opera premiered at the Oper Frankfurt, conducted by Markus Stenz, directed by Christian Pade. The plot of Camus' play tells of the last days of Caligula.

== Roles ==
Roles, voice types, premiere cast
Role	Voice type	Premiere cast, 7 October 2006 Conductor: Markus Stenz
Caligula	dramatic baritone	Ashley Holland
Caesonia	mezzo-soprano	Michaela Schuster
Helicon	countertenor	Martin Wölfel
Cherea	bass	Gregory Frank
Scipio	contralto	Jurgita Adamonyte
Mucius	tenor	Hans-Jürgen Lazar
Mereia/Lepidus	baritone	Dietrich Volle
Livia	soprano	Barbara Zechmeister
Drusila	silent role	
Four poets	2 tenors, 2 basses	Constantin Neiconi, Michael Schulte, Jin Soo Lee, Matthias Holzmann

== Recording ==
- Caligula – Ashley Holland (Caligula), Michaela Schuster (Caesonia), Martin Wölfel (Helicon), and Dietrich Volle (Mereia/Lepidus), Barbara Zechmeister (Livia), Hans-Jürgen Lazar (Mucius), Frankfurter Opern- und Museumsorchester, Markus Stenz, Oehms 2012
