= Natascha Trofimowa =

German prima ballerina (1923–1979)

Natascha Trofimowa (1923–1979) was a German prima ballerina with the Berlin State Opera and latterly with the Bavarian State Opera in Munich.

== Early life ==
Born to Russian immigrants (her mother was of German origin) in Berlin on 23 April 1923, she attended the Cecilien-Lyzeum, a girls grammar school, before receiving ballet training at the Berlin schools of Eugenia Eduardova and, above all, Tatjana Gsovsky.

== Career ==
In 1946, she joined the German State Opera where she made her début as Stravinsky's Petrushka, receiving an engagement as prima ballerina. She proved to be a brilliant, surprisingly expressive interpreter of classical ballet, especially in Gsovsky's creations.

After cancelling her contract with the East-German State Opera, she toured West Germany with Werner Egk's Abraxas company in 1951, and gave guest performances in Hamburg and Frankfurt. Thereafter she joined the Bavarian State Opera ballet in Munich which she made her home until 1972. During the period, she also frequently danced on tour at home and abroad.

Among her successes were Juliet in Romeo and Juliet, Aurora in The Sleeping Beauty, Ophelia in Hamlet, Aglaya in The Idiot, Isabeau in Joan von Zarissa and Bellastriga in Abraxas.
