= Markus Marquardt =

German bass-baritone (born 1970)

Markus Marquardt (born 1970) is a German bass-baritone.

Born in Düsseldorf, Marquardt studied singing with Werner Lechte at the Robert Schumann Hochschule. He appeared in Wagner's Parsifal, conducted by Simon Rattle, in Amsterdam and in Elektra with Lorin Maazel at the Salzburg Festival. From 1996 to 2000, Marquardt worked at the Stuttgart State Opera, including Papageno in Mozart's The Magic Flute and the title roles in The Marriage of Figaro and Verdi's Rigoletto.

Since 2000, he has been a member of the Semperoper in Dresden. He also appeared as a guest at the Hamburg State Opera, the Bregenz Festival, the Bavarian State Opera, the Deutsche Oper am Rhein, the Bremen Theater and Teatro alla Scala.

He won first prize in the national competition Jugend musiziert in 1993 and the Christel-Goltz Prize in 2004. In 2006, he appeared in the recorded final concert of the Rheingau Musik Festival in Mozart's Great Mass in C minor. The version of Robert D. Levin was performed by the Gächinger Kantorei, Bach-Collegium Stuttgart, conducted by Helmuth Rilling, the other soloists being Diana Damrau, Juliane Banse and Lothar Odinius.
