= Christoph Pohl =

German opera singer

- Born: 26 July 1976 (age 49)
- Education: Musikhochschule Hannover
- Occupation: Operatic baritone
- Organization: Semperoper
- Awards: Christel-Goltz Prize; Hamburger Kammersänger

Christoph Pohl (born 26 July 1976 in Hanover) is a German operatic baritone who has performed at major opera houses in Europe, based at the Semperoper in Dresden from 2005 to 2018.

== Career ==
Pohl was a member of the Knabenchor Hannover, and then studied voice at the Musikhochschule Hannover with Carol Richardson-Smith. He studied further as a member of the studio of the Hamburg State Opera from 2003 to 2005. He then became a member of the Semperoper in Dresden, where he remained until 2018. He appeared as Mozart's Count Almaviva in Le nozze di Figaro, Guglielmo in Così fan tutte, Papageno in Die Zauberflöte, as Rossini's Figaro in Il barbiere di Siviglia, Dandini in La Cenerentola, as Belcore in Donizetti's L'elisir d'amore, Verdi's Giorgio Germont in La traviata and Posa in Don Carlos, as Valentin in Gounod's Faust, Chorèbe in Les Troyens by Berlioz, Wolfram in Wagner's Tannhäuser, the title role of Weinberger's Schwanda the Bagpiper, Puccini's Lescaut in Manon Lescaut, Marcello in La bohème, Sharpless in Madama Butterfly, Spielmann in Humperdinck's Königskinder, Harlequin in Ariadne auf Naxos by Richard Strauss, Danilo in Léhar's Die lustige Witwe, and the title role in Tchaikovsky's Eugene Onegin. He was awarded the Christel-Goltz Prize of the Semperoper Foundation in 2008.

In 2015, Pohl first appeared at the Royal Opera House in London as Johannes in the world premiere of Morgen und Abend by Georg Friedrich Haas, in a coproduction with the Deutsche Oper Berlin. The composer had written the role especially for his voice. He returned to London for Verdi's Posa in Don Carlo and Germont in La traviata. He performed as a guest also at the Deutsche Oper Berlin, the Oper Leipzig, Staatsoper Stuttgart, Theater an der Wien in Vienna, Opéra de Lyon and La Fenice in Venice. He appeared at the Bavarian State Opera in the 2020–21 season as Frank in Korngold's Die tote Stadt.

== Awards ==
- 2024 Hamburger Kammersänger
