= Klaus Florian Vogt =

German operatic tenor (born 1970)

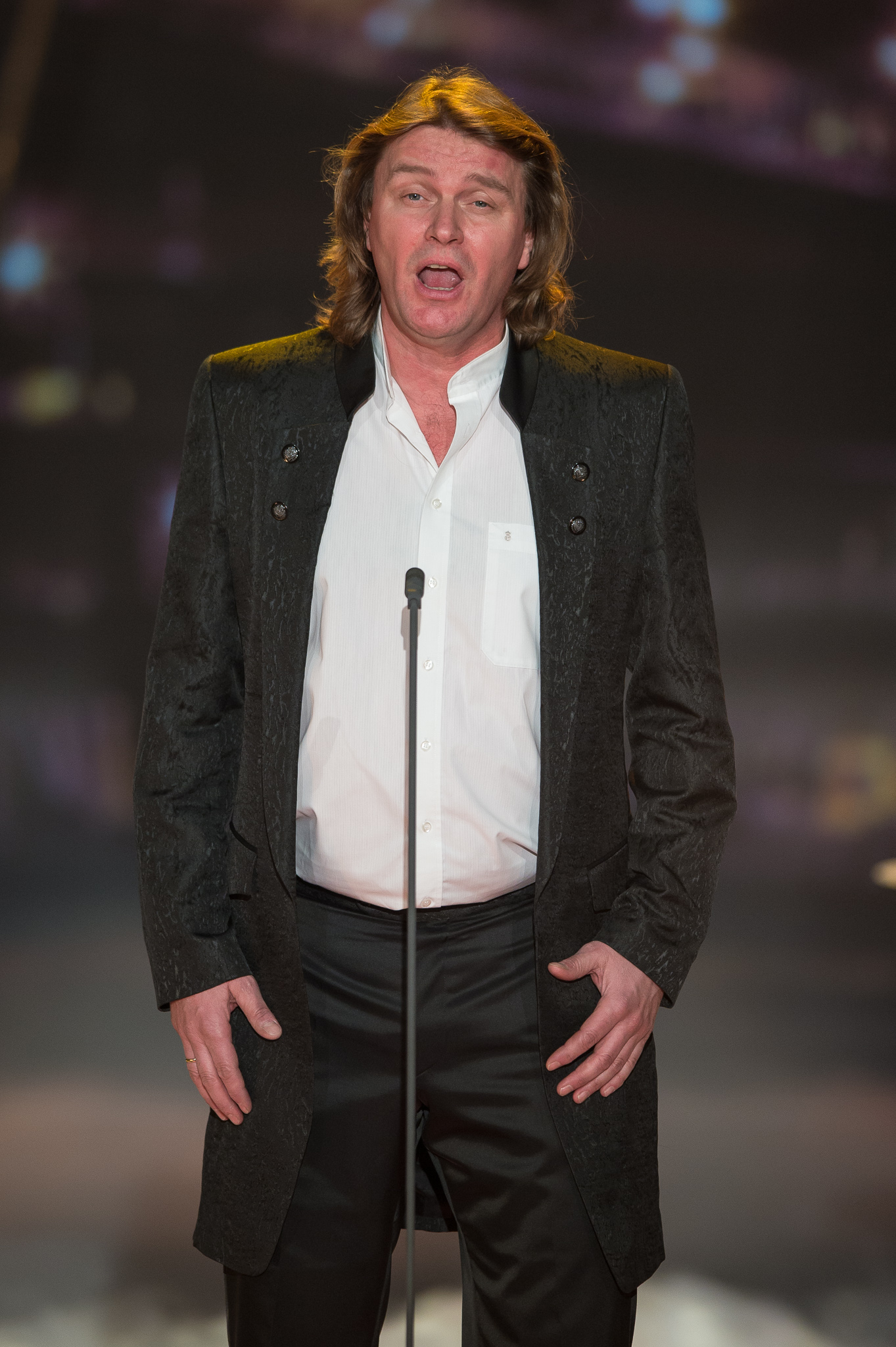
- Vogt in 2015
- Born: 12 April 1970 (age 56); Heide, Schleswig-Holstein, West Germany
- Education: Lübeck Academy of Music
- Occupation: Classical operatic tenor
- Organization: Semperoper

Klaus Florian Vogt (born 12 April 1970) is a German operatic tenor. He has often sung roles written by Richard Wagner.

== Career ==
Klaus Florian Vogt was a hornist first and played for several years with the Hamburg Philharmonic. He studied voice at the Lübeck Academy of Music and was first engaged at the Landestheater in Flensburg.

In 1998 he moved to the Semperoper in Dresden, where he worked with Giuseppe Sinopoli and Colin Davis. He started as a lyrical tenor, singing Tamino in Mozart's Die Zauberflöte, then also Hans in Smetana's The Bartered Bride and Matteo in Strauss' Arabella.

He sang Wagner's Lohengrin first at the Theater Erfurt in 2002, followed by international appearances in this part and also as Stolzing in Die Meistersinger von Nürnberg, his debut part at the Bayreuther Festspiele in 2007, and Parsifal. Furthermore, in 2026, Vogt undertook the marathon task of singing roles in each of the four operas in Der Ring des Nibelungen: Loge (for the first time as the character) in Das Rheingold, Siegmund in Die Walküre, and Siegfried in the titular opera as well as Götterdämmerung.

In the concert repertoire, he recorded Mahler's Das Lied von der Erde, with Christian Gerhaher and the Montreal Symphony Orchestra, conducted by Kent Nagano in 2009.

Several reviewers have characterized Vogt's voice as "reedy".
