= Laura Sarti =

Italian operatic singer (1929-2026)

- Born: 1 June 1924; Trieste, Italy
- Died: 21 August 2026 (aged 102); Lewes, U.K.
- Occupation: Operatic singer

Laura Sarti (1 June 1924 – 21 August 2026) MBE was an Italian operatic mezzo-soprano. She began her career at the Glyndebourne Festival Opera and subsequently taught at the Guildhall School of Music and Drama.
