= Peter Kajlinger =

Swedish operatic baritone (born 1964)

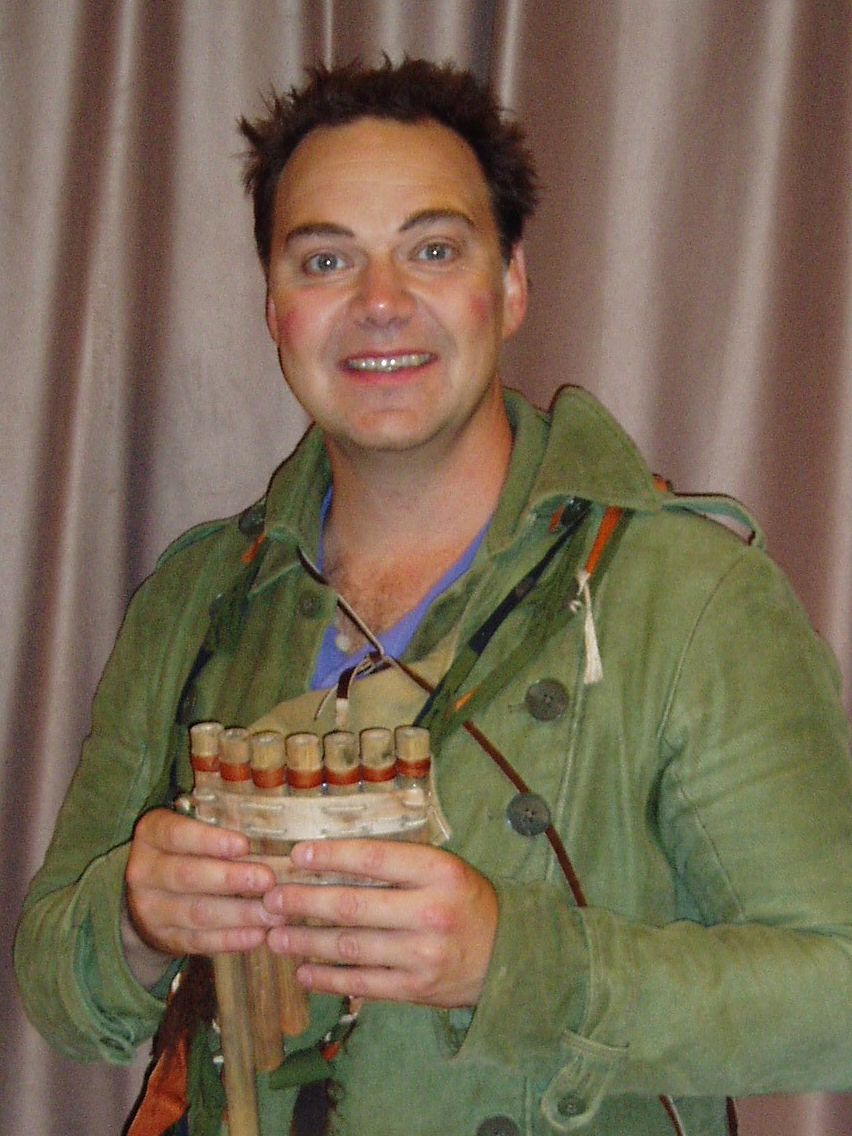
Peter Kajlinger performed as Papageno in 2009

Peter Kajlinger (born 2 December 1964) is a Swedish operatic baritone. Kajlinger grew up in a family of musicians. He made his debut in La Bohème at the Royal Swedish Opera in Stockholm at the age of 11.

== Career ==
He entered the University College of Opera in Stockholm in 1989 and performed as Moralés (Carmen) and Leporello (Don Giovanni) at the Royal Swedish Opera. Upon graduation in 1992, he sang the role of Falstaff by Salieri at Drottningholm Court Theatre. Pamela Rosenberg, then casting director of Staatsoper Stuttgart, noticed his performances as Leporello and Figaro and invited him to join the company. At Staatsoper Stuttgart, he sang more than twenty roles.

He performed as Figaro at GöteborgsOperan in 2000. He became a freelance singer in 2003 with recitals as Masetto (Don Giovanni), Michelotto (Die Gezeichneten), Antonio (Le Nozze di Figaro) at Staatsoper Stuttgart and as Don Carlo (La forza del Destino) at Södertäljeoperan. Kajlinger originated the role of Mr. Verloc in Simon Wills' opera, (The Secret Agent), in 2006 at Feldkircher Musikfestival.

He sang Amonasro (Aida) at Opera på Skäret in 2007 and Major Domo in Tjajkovskij's Pique Dame at Oper der Stadt Bonn. He performed as Scarpia (Tosca) in 2008 and as Rigoletto at Värmlandsoperan in 2009. He was Marcello (La Bohème) at Opera på Skäret in 2010. He was praised as Dr. Treves in the worldpremiere of The Elephant Man at Norrlandsoperan 2012. At Wermland Opera he sang Bartolo and Pizarro in the Trilogy directed by Tobias Kratzer 2014-2015. In 2017 he portrayed the Captain in Bohuslav Martinu´s The Greek Passion. He played the main character in The Emperor´s New Clothes at Norrlandsoperan 2021

== Opera ==
=== Roles ===
Year	Role	Production	Direction	Opera
1996	Grimbald	King Arthur; Henry Purcell	Martin Kusej	Staatsoper Stuttgart
1998	Fidel/ Gramsci	Al gran sole carico d´amore Luigi Nono	Martin Kusej	Staatsoper Stuttgart
2000	Taddeo	L´italiana in Algeri; Gioachino Rossini	Jossi Wieler	Staatsoper Stuttgart
2001	Eustachio	I pazzi per progetto Gaetano Donizetti	Martin Kusej	Staatsoper Stuttgart
2008	Zlatogor	Pique Dame; Pjotr Tjajkovskij	Johannes Schaaf	Oper Bonn
2014	Dr. Bartolo	Il barbiere di Siviglia; Gioachino Rossini	Tobias Kratzer	Wermland Opera
2018	Frank	Die Fledermaus; Johann Strauss	Sam Brown	Wermland Opera
2023	Bottom	A Midsummer Night's Dream; Benjamin Britten	Tobias Theorell	Kungliga Operan

== Discography ==
- Jan-Åke Hillerud: Slaget om Dungen
- Luigi Nono: Al gran sole carico d'amore
- Staffan Odenhall: Purpurbit

== Filmography ==
- Christina, 1988, Directed by Göran Järvefelt

== Sources ==
- Brüggemann, Axel, Stuttgart entdeckt „Masaniello furioso“, Die Welt, 12 February 2001 (in German)
- Dahlberg, Mats, Tysk trio skapar banbrytande Verdiopera i Karlstad, Nya Wermlands-Tidningen, 23 October 2009 (in Swedish)
- Wermland Operan biography (Wermland Opera),, (in Swedish)
- Wurzel, Christoph, , Online Musik Magazin (in German)
