= Die Deutsche Bühne =

German theatre magazine

Die Deutsche Bühne is the oldest German theatre magazine and reports on the fields of acting, music theatre and dance. It first appeared under this title in 1909. The publisher is the Deutscher Bühnenverein. The editorial team consists of Detlef Brandenburg (Editor-in-Chief), Detlev Baur (Deputy Editor-in-Chief), Ulrike Kolter and Andreas Falentin.

The magazine is published monthly by Inspiring Network Verlag in Hamburg. The circulation is of 7,000 copies. The Deutsche Bühne is available in newsstands and can be subscribed to.

An offshoot of the Deutsche Bühne is the youth theatre magazine die junge bühne, which first appeared in 2007. The free magazine is aimed at audiences and active people aged 15 and over and is published every year in September.

Once a year after the end of the theatre season, Die Deutsche Bühne publishes its critics' survey, which covers all genres of contemporary German-speaking theatre: drama, opera, dance and "experimental forms". Fifty nine authors of the journal took part in the 2020 survey, choosing the Münchner Kammerspiele under the outgoing artistic director Matthias Lilienthal. In 2020, the Landestheater Schwaben in Memmingen directed by Kathrin Mädler was considered the most "convincing" theatre work "away from the big centres". According to the critics, the "outstanding directing contribution to the current development of acting" was made by Johan Simons with Hamlet at the Schauspielhaus Bochum. In the new section "Format in Shutdown" the streaming programme of the Schaubühne in Berlin was considered excellent.

== Topics ==
Topics include: reports from German municipal and state theatres, reviews of new productions, reports and trends. As the magazine is published by the Deutschen Bühnenverein, the reporting is mainly concentrated on theatres members of the Association.
