= Kathrin Mädler =

German dramaturge

Kathrin Mädler (born 1976) is a German dramaturge, theatre director and artistic director.

== Life ==
Born in Osnabrück, Mädler studied dramaturgy as well as theatre and literature at LMU Munich and the Bayerische Theaterakademie August Everding. Further studies in Cincinnati, Ohio and at the University of California, Irvine followed before she graduated and received her doctorate in Munich.

After teaching at the LMU Munich and the WWU Münster, she was a guest assistant director at the Staatstheater Karlsruhe and the Burgtheater Vienna.

In 2005, she was hired at the Staatstheater Nürnberg as a dramaturge and director. From there, she went to the Münster Theatre in 2012 as a senior dramaturge. In 2016, she left Münster and went to the Landestheater Schwaben in Memmingen as artistic director. In July 2020, it was announced that the Zweckverband des Landestheaters Schwaben had extended Intendant Mädler's contract by five years. At the 2019 Federal Theatre Award, the Landestheater Schwaben had been one of the eleven prize winners.

Since June 2019, Mädler has been, together with Hasko Weber, chairwoman of the Intendants' Group at the Deutscher Bühnenverein.

In 2022, she will take over as artistic director of the Theater Oberhausen in the Rhineland.
