= Klaus Zehelein =

German dramaturge (born 1940)

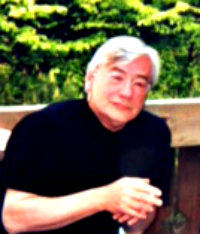
- Born: 5 September 1940 (age 85); Frankfurt, Germany
- Education: Goethe University Frankfurt
- Occupation: Dramaturge
- Spouse: Marianne Weigmann

Klaus Zehelein (born 5 September 1940) is a German dramaturge. He was president of the Munich Bayerische Theaterakademie August Everding. Zehelein is also president of the association of German theatres, Deutscher Bühnenverein. For fifteen years, from 1991 until 2006, Zehelein was artistic director of the Staatsoper Stuttgart. Critic Gerhard Rohde, summing up Zehelein's theatre work at the Stuttgart opera, says "Zehelein does not view opera as a culinary phenomenon. For him opera is an extremely complex matter, where all arts – as well as social, philosophical, historic, utopic and other aspects – unite. This complexity of opera merits being perceived, being seen, being experienced; thus all works that end up performed on stage, are rigorously analyzed beforehand. He who says this results in thinned-out, merely sophisticated opera performances, missed out substantially in the Zehelein-Era in Stuttgart."

== Education and professional activity ==
Zehelein studied German literature, musicology and philosophy in the Goethe University Frankfurt. Among his teachers were the philosophers Max Horkheimer and Theodor W. Adorno. Although not a composer himself, Zehelein participated in the Darmstädter Ferienkurse from 1959 to 1966. Here he met composers Luigi Nono and Karlheinz Stockhausen, which would influence Zehelein's future artistic development. Zehelein began his professional activity at the Theater Kiel in 1967, then became chief dramaturge at the Oldenburgisches Staatstheater.

From 1977 to 1987 he worked at the Oper Frankfurt, starting as chief dramaturge and becoming opera director. In Frankfurt Zehelein developed a practical but intellectually supported manner of interpreting and staging opera. He worked with the stage director Hans Neuenfels on Busoni's Doktor Faust and Neuenfels' production of Verdi's Aida – known as "Aida as cleaning-lady production". With director Ruth Berghaus and her designer Axel Manthey, he worked on Wagner's Parsifal and Ring. Zehelein moved to Hamburg in 1989 as artistic director of the Thalia Theater before being offered the position of artistic director at the Stuttgart opera.

== Stuttgart Opera 1991–2006 ==
During Zehelein's directorship, the Opernwelt magazine awarded the title Opera House of the Year to the Stuttgart Opera. Six awards were given, in the years 1994, 1998, 1999, 2000, 2002, and 2006. Zehelein's era in Stuttgart is documented in the book Anders, ein Arbeitsbericht.

Zehelein brought in Pamela Rosenberg as co-opera Intendant between 1991 and 2000 and Eytan Pessen as casting director from 2001 to 2006. His chief dramaturge was Juliane Votteler.

Zehelein worked with stage directors Ruth Berghaus, Martin Kušej, Nicolas Brieger, Christof Nel, Neuenfels, Peter Konwitchny, Joachim Schlömer, Jossi Wieler and Sergio Morabito.

Under Zehelein's direction the Stuttgart Opera was an ensemble based opera company. The sopranos Catherine Naglestad and Eva-Maria Westbroek were members of his permanent ensemble, tenor Jonas Kaufmann a frequent guest artist. Music directors were Gabriele Ferro and Lothar Zagrosek. Nicola Luisotti conducted frequently during Zehelein's era.

In his fifteen years Zehelein explored most of the 20th century's opera standard repertoire, such as Berg's Wozzeck and Lulu, Shostakovich's Lady Macbeth of Mtsensk, Schreker's Die Gezeichneten, Busoni's Doktor Faust, and Nono's Al gran sole carico d'amore and Intolleranza 1960. The work was performed over numerous seasons in a total of 29 performances. Zehelein performed works of the composers Lachenmann, Jungy Pagh Pan, Hans Zender and Rolf Riehm.

Zehelein argued that as Richard Wagner wrote the four music-dramas of the Ring over many years, changing dramaturgical ideas in the process, each opera could be treated as a stand-alone work. Zehelein invited four directors for his Ring, thus giving each opera dramatic independence. The resulting Stuttgarter Ring brought much discussion and recognition to the Stuttgart Opera.

Zehelein created the Forum Neues Musiktheater, an institute attached to the Stuttgart Opera. "Here new compositions were not only studied and presented," sayd the critic Gerhard Rohde, "but more important was the work-nature of the institute: a laboratory, in which young, and not so young composers develop their ideas, and together with musicians, singers, dancers, and new media realize these ideas into a scenic reality" Zehelein also founded the Junge Oper (an institute dedicated to performing opera for young audiences).

Numerous CD and DVD productions document Zehelein's interest in modern works and new staging concepts. Stuttgart CD productions include Nono's Intolleranza 1960(1995) and Al Gran Sole Carico D'Amore (2001), as well as Lachenmann's Das Mädchen mit den Schwefelhölzern (2003); Zehelein's productions on DVD: Handel's Alcina (1999), Hartmann's Simplicius Simplicissimus (2005), Mozart's La finta giardiniera (2006) and Wagner's Der Ring des Nibelungen (2003).

== Teaching ==
Zehelein taught Sociomusicology at the Oldenburg University. He was also guest professor at the Minnesota State University, the Collège international de philosophie in Paris, the Institute for theatre arts at the University of Giessen and from 1986 to 1992 in the University of Applied Arts Vienna. As of 2006, he has directed the dramaturgy division of LMU Munich and the Bavarian Academy of Theatre in Munich. His ideas about music theater dramaturgy are published in the book Music theater today

== Other activities ==
As of May 2003, Zehelein is president of the association of German theatres (Deutscher Bühnenverein). His political and moral influence is crucial in times of heavy cuts in public financing of the arts. As of August 2006, Zehelein is also president of the Munich Bayerische Theaterakademie August Everding (Bavarian theatre academy) located in the Prinzregententheater. The Theaterakademie is a university level academy offering BA and MA courses in directing, acting, musical theatre, singing, opera, make up, dramaturgy, theatre- film- and television criticism, set and costume design.

== Awards ==
Zehelein received the German critics prize for his dramaturgical work at the Oper Frankfurt in 1983. He also received the Order of Merit of Baden-Württemberg in 2001, for his work in the state. The Officer's Cross of the Order of Merit of the Federal Republic of Germany was granted to him in the summer of 2006. In 2007, he became a member of the Bayerische Akademie der Schönen Künste. In 2023, he received Der Faust award for lifetime achievement.
