= Claus Guth =

German theatre director (born 1964)

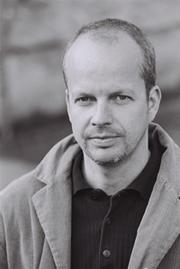
- Claus Guth in 2006
- Born: 3 February 1964 (age 62); Frankfurt, Germany
- Education: LMU Munich; University of Music and Theatre Munich
- Occupation: Opera director
- Organizations: Theater Basel; Opernhaus Zürich; Salzburg Festival
- Awards: Der Faust

Claus Guth (born 3 February 1964) is a German theatre director, focused on opera. He has directed operas at major houses and festivals, including world premieres such as works of the Munich Biennale, and Berio's Cronaca del luogo at the Salzburg Festival in 1999. Guth is particularly known for his opera productions of the works of Richard Wagner and Richard Strauss. He has received two Faust awards, for Daphne by Richard Strauss in 2010, and for Debussy's Pelléas et Mélisande, both at the Oper Frankfurt.

== Life and career ==
=== Early life ===
Born in Frankfurt on 3 February 1964, Claus Guth first studied philosophy, German studies and theatre studies at LMU Munich, and later theatre and opera directing with Cornel Franz at the University of Music and Theatre Munich.

=== Contemporary opera ===
Guth has focused on contemporary opera. He has staged several world premieres, some in the context of the Munich Biennale, such as Hanna Kulenty's The Mother of Black Winged Dreams (in a co-production with the Hamburg State Opera) in 1996, Chaya Czernowin's Pnima...ins Innere, and Johannes Maria Staud's Berenice, to a libretto by Durs Grünbein based on Edgar Allan Poe in a 2004 co-production with the Staatstheater am Gärtnerplatz.

In 1995, he directed Henze's El Cimarrón at the Atlanta Opera. He staged the world premiere of Berio's Cronaca del luogo at the Salzburg Festival in 1999, which is regarded as his international break-through. He went on to direct the premieres of Klaus Huber's Schwarzerde at the Theater Basel in 2001, of Unsichtbar Land with music by Helmut Oehring and Henry Purcell there in 2006. He directed the world premieres of Peter Ruzicka's Celan at the Semperoper in Dresden in 2001, and of Avet Terterian's The Earthquake in Chile at the Staatstheater am Gärtnerplatz in 2020. The collaboration with Oehring continued with his SehnSuchtMEER oder Vom Fliegenden Holländer at the Deutsche Oper am Rhein in 2013, and with AscheMOND oder The Fairy Queen at the Staatsoper Unter den Linden, performed at Schiller-Theater in Berlin the same year. He directed the world premieres of Beat Furrer's Violetter Schnee at the Staatsoper Berlin, and of Czernowin's Heart Chamber at the Deutsche Oper Berlin, both in 2019.

=== Other operas ===
Guth directed Verdi's La traviata at the Nationaltheater Mannheim, Otello at the Opernhaus Dortmund, and Stravinsky's The Rake's Progress at the Staatstheater Nürnberg. At the Prinzregententheater in Munich, he staged Purcell's King Arthur as a joint project of all courses of the Bayerische Theaterakademie August Everding in 2001. At the Staatstheater am Gärtnerplatz, he directed there Lortzing's Der Wildschütz in 1998, recorded for television by Bayerischer Rundfunk. In 2001, he directed Werner Egk's Der Revisor, and in 2002 Wagner's Das Liebesverbot (in another co-production with the Everding Academy), and in 2007 an operetta survey, In mir klingt ein Lied. Eine Operetten-Topographie., in his first encounter with the genre.

Guth directed at the Theater Basel Wagner's Tannhäuser, Weber's Der Freischütz in 2003, and Rossini's Il barbiere di Siviglia in 2004 which was also presented in Düsseldorf and Munich. In 2005, he interpreted Mozart's Lucio Silla for the Wiener Festwochen, played at the Theater an der Wien. He first worked at the Bavarian State Opera in Verdi's Luisa Miller in 2007. Guth worked continuously with manager Alexander Pereira at the Opernhaus Zürich, on Gluck's Iphigénie en Tauride in 2001), Schubert's Fierrabras conducted by Franz Welser-Möst in 2003, Ariane et Barbe-bleue by Paul Dukas in 2005, Ariadne auf Naxos by Richard Strauss in 2006, and Wagner's Tristan und Isolde in 2008 and Parsifal in 2011.

Guth has worked regularly for the Salzburg Festival since the Berio premiere in 1999. It was followed by Gluck's Iphigénie en Tauride in 2001, In the Mozart year 2006, he directed a new production of Le nozze di Figaro, conducted by Nikolaus Harnoncourt, and Zaide, the latter combined with Czernowin's Adama in its world premiere. He directed Don Giovanni in 2008 and Così fan tutte in 2009. All three Da Ponte productions were kept on the festival program for several years.

In 2003, Guth staged Wagner's Der fliegende Holländer at the Bayreuth Festival. He staged all works of the Bayreuth canon: in 2007 Die Meistersinger von Nürnberg at the Semperoper, from 2008 to 2010 Der Ring des Nibelungen with Hamburg's Generalmusikdirektor Simone Young, in 2010 Tannhäuser at the Vienna State Opera; in 2011 Parsifal in a production of the Liceu in Barcelona with the Opernhaus Zürich, conducted by Daniele Gatti, and finally Lohengrin for the inaugurazione of the new season at la Scala in Milan on 7 December 2012, conducted by Daniel Barenboim.

Guth staged Daphne by Richard Strauss at the Oper Frankfurt in 2010, which earned him the award Der Faust. He directed Die Frau ohne Schatten at la Scala in 2012, and in 2014 at the Royal Opera House in London conducted by Semyon Bychkov.

In a regular collaboration with the Theater an der Wien, he brought Handel's Messiah to the stage in 2008. The biblical texts of the oratorio were combined with an invented plot; the choirs (sung by the Arnold Schoenberg Choir) were combined with a stylised choreography, and a dancer and a deaf performer who expressed herself in sign language) were added as further layers. The performance was recorded by ORF and has also been released on DVD. Guth began a cycle of Monteverdi's operas in 2011 with L'Orfeo, continued in 2012 with Il ritorno d'Ulisse in patria and concluded in 2015 with L'incoronazione di Poppea. In December 2013, he worked on another oratorio in a staged version, Schubert's Lazarus, supplemented with further vocal works by Schubert as well as instrumental works by Charles Ives.

In November 2012, Guth staged Debussy's Pelléas et Mélisande at the Oper Frankfurt, which earned him the Faust award again. For years, Guth has collaborated with the stage and costume designer Christian Schmidt. He also often works with the choreographer Ramses Sigl. In 2021, he staged Poulenc's Dialogues des Carmélites at the Oper Frankfurt, conducted by Giedrė Šlekytė.

== Awards ==
- 2010: Der Faust for Strauss' Daphne, Oper Frankfurt
- 2013: Der Faust for Debussy's Pelléas et Mélisande, Oper Frankfurt
- 2018: International Opera Awards (nomination)
- 2025/2026: 'Stage director of the year' by the opera magazine Opernwelt.
