= Aleksandar Denić =

Serbian scenograph

Aleksandar Denić (born 31 October 1963, in Belgrade) (outside Serbia frequently spelt Aleksandar Denic) is a Serbian visual artist, stage designer and film production designer. He is known as a scenographer of feature films, as well as for his work at major theatres including Berlin, Hamburg, Stuttgart, Bayreuth, Paris, Zurich, Wien, Salzburg, Köln and Munich.

== Life ==
Denić graduated from the Academy of Applied Arts of the University of the Arts in Belgrade in painting, film and set design. He worked after graduation mainly as a production designer for film projects, including the film Underground by Emir Kusturica. He was also production designer for over 100 television commercials, for clients including Renault, SAS and Lucky Strike.

In 2011 he met with the German theatre director Frank Castorf, who came to Belgrade for a cooperation project. For his stage set at Castorf's production of Louis-Ferdinand Céline's Journey to the End of the Night in 2013 at the Munich Residenztheater he won the 2014 theatre critics' poll of Theater heute magazine as "Set designer of the year."

In the year 2013 he worked with Castorf in staging Richard Wagner's Ring Cycle at the Bayreuth Festival.

In 2015, Denić worked at the Deutsches Schauspielhaus Hamburg, and also at the Residenz Theatre, Munich.

== Awards ==
- 1996: Nominee Primetime Emmy Awards Outstanding Art Direction for a Miniseries or a Special "Rasputin"
- 2014: Nominated for Best Designer at International Opera Awards
- 2014: "Set designer of the year" (Theater heute magazine) for Journey to the End of Night, Residenztheater, Munich
- 2014: Der Faust in the category "Staging and costume".
- 2014: "Stage designer of the year" (Opernwelt magazine) for Der Ring des Nibelungen, Bayreuth Festival
- 2015: "Set designer of the year" (Theater heute magazine) for Baal, Residenztheater, Munich
- 2020: Nominated for Best Designer at International Opera Awards

== Filmography ==
- 1995: Underground
- 1996: Rasputin: Dark Servant of Destiny
- 2001: Boomerang
- 2001: Super 8 Stories
- 2002: Deathwatch
- 2004: Falling into Paradise
- 2006: Guca!
- 2008: Die Rote Zora
- 2009: Zone of the Dead
- 2012: Cat Run
- 2012: Chernobyl Diaries
- 2014: Travelator
