= Kaczmarczyk =

Kaczmarczyk is a Polish surname. Notable people with the surname include:

- Adrienne Kaczmarczyk Hungarian musicologist
- Anna Karczmarczyk (born 1991), Polish actress
- André Kaczmarczyk (born 1986), German actor and director
- Bogusław Kaczmarczyk (born 1974), Polish television actor and comedian
- Jarosław Kaczmarczyk (1885–1944), head of the Lemko-Rusyn Republic
- Judith Kaczmarczyk Nerat (1948–2012), Democratic politician and member of the Michigan State House of Representatives
- Norbert Kaczmarczyk (born 1989), Polish politician serving as a member of the Sejm
- Rafał Kaczmarczyk (born 1972), Polish footballer
- Wanda Fukała-Kaczmarczyk (born 1935), Polish fencer
- Zdzisław Kaczmarczyk (1911–1980), Polish historian
