= Slovenian Youth Theatre =

Coordinates: 46°3′39.82″N 14°30′34.28″E

Mladinsko Theatre
- Interactive map of Mladinsko Theatre
- Address: Vilharjeva 11; Ljubljana; Slovenia
- Designation: Slovensko mladinsko gledališče

Construction
- Opened: 1955
- Rebuilt: 1989
- Architect: Jože Plečnik

Website
- en.mladinsko.com/home

The Slovenian Youth Theatre or Mladinsko Theatre (Slovene: Slovensko mladinsko gledališče) was founded in Ljubljana in 1955 as the first professional theater for children and youth in Slovenia. It is situated in the Baraga Seminary, which was built by architect Jože Plečnik in the center of Ljubljana. In the 1980s, it became a center of theatrical research and politically-engaged theater. It is known for a wide range of innovative poetics of different directors and an ensemble energy, a Peter Brook-like approach to acting with a laboratory for theatre research for actors, directors, choreographers and musicians to research, develop, and create.

== History ==
=== Introduction ===
Mladinsko Theatre was founded in 1955 by Balbina Baranovič, the directress who also founded the first experimental theatre company in Slovenia. Throughout its history, the theatre has collaborated with the theatre reformers that shaped the Slovenian theatre during the second half of the 20th century.

The Mladinsko Theatre's development progressed with contemporary theatre practices of the reformers of the Slovenian theatre during the second half of the 20th century, including directors Žarko Petan, Mile Korun, Dušan Jovanović, Ljubiša Ristić, Meta Hočevar, Paolo Magelli, Janez Pipan, Vito Taufer, Tomaž Pandur, Eduard Miler, Matjaž Pograjc, Martin Kušej, Dragan Živadinov, Emil Hrvatin, Tomi Janežič, Matjaž Berger, Jan Decorte, Diego de Brea, Jernej Lorenci, Ivica Buljan, Silvan Omerzu, Oliver Frljić, Borut Šeparović and Damjan Kozole.

=== 1970s ===
In the early 1970s, Slovenian playwright Dominik Smole became managing director of the theatre and ensured that the Mladinsko presented artistically demanding youth performances. The Mladinsko was on the theatre margin, which allowed many different creative energies to congregate there. The political powers deemed the theatre unimportant, which enabled organizational and programmatic changes to be made. The 1970s also marked a time of crisis at the Drama Ljubljana (the Slovene National Theatre, Ljubljana), where circumstances prevented the development of the kind of contemporary theatre which Mladinsko started developing with the arrival of Dušan Jovanović.

=== 1980s ===
During the next decade – when Petar Jović became the managing director and Dušan Jovanović the artistic director (with the help of the dramaturg Marko Slodnjak), followed by Ivo Svetina – was marked by the projects by Ljubiša Ristić, especially Missa in a minor, which began the series of projects that marked the Mladinsko as the nexus of the political and at experimental theatre. Around the mid-1980s, poetics that were not bound to "actual political" began to appear, first with the projects by Vito Taufer, then the performances by Janez Pipan and Scheherezade by Ivo Svetina, directed by Tomaž Pandur, and Dragan Živadinov's projects. This line has continued from the 1990s through the present in the form of diversity and auto-poetics in performances such as those by Eduard Miler, Matjaž Pograjc, Emil Hrvatin, Tomi Janežič, Matjaž Berger, Diego de Brea and a wide range of contemporary theatre artists.

=== 1990s ===
Under the leadership of Eduard Miler, Tomaž Toporišič, Matjaž Berger, and, in the last few seasons of the current director of the theatre Uršula Cetinski, Mladinsko became a setting for the wealth of diversity, while remaining the Slovenian centre of theatre research. The accents of Martin Kušej (Scandal after Cankar), Meta Hočevar (A Family Album), Matjaž Pograjc (Roberto Zucco, Fragile!), Emil Hrvatin (Male Fantasies), Eduard Miler (Susn, The Mission), Tomi Janežič (Oedipus Rex, Utva), Matjaž Berger (Galileo Galilei, Interpretacija sanj), Diego de Brea (The Damned, Crime and Punishment), Ivica Buljan (Young Flesh), Jernej Lorenci (Gilgamesh), Vinko Möderndorfer (Blasted), Barbara Novakovič, Vlado Repnik, Ivan Peternelj, Jan Decorte, Sebastijan Horvat, Damjan Kozole, Silvan Omerzu, and many others, have, together with Taufer's research of a wide territory of theatre function (such as the performances Silence Silence Silence, Pippi, and Midsummer Night's Dream) and the projects of Dragan Živadinov resulted in the aesthetically most diverse period in the history of the theatre that the critical machinery in Slovenia – due to the limited tools with which it was operating, and ideological altercations of the political left, connected to the so-called independent or "dependent" production – didn't know to contextualize or couldn't analyse.

== Activities ==
Together with several representatives of the so-called independent scene, the Mladinsko Theatre of the last two-and-a-half decades has been a place of creation which has brought strong impulses into the more institutional Slovenian theatre. The impulses moved in the direction of Richard Kostelanetz's "theatre of combined ways of expression for the post-literary age". On the one hand, it emphasises "meta-theatricality" as defined by Bonnie Marranca, (for instance, the focusing upon the third paradigm of the spectator and their perception and, on the other hand, the double coding of theatre springing from the tactics of the historical neo-avant-gardes, post-avant-gardes and political performances of the second half of the 20th century.

The tactics of epicization, formalist and energy theatre, the stage of the landscape, of parataxis, simultaneity, play with the density of signs, musicalization, visual dramaturgy, intrusions of the real, the scenic essay, heterogeneity, metonymic space, framing, scenic montage, aesthetics of speed, aesthetics vs. the real body, intermediality – to use the terminology used by Hans-Thies Lehmann for the analysis of the postdramatic – have taken the Mladinsko Theatre into the heterogeneous spheres of contemporary performing arts at the meeting points of various artistic mediums.

The placement of these phenomena into the international and festival theatre space was extremely important. Today, when audience members are ensconced in the post post-socialist era of the so-called transition period in Slovenia, the historic distance enables them to claim that without this support from abroad, Mladinsko as an example of contemporary theatre wouldn't have survived. The positive response in Europe and the Americas was critical for the continuation of the research. Thus, the duality occurred: Mladinsko was relatively marginalized in Slovenia, while abroad it represented Slovenian art, culture and even the country.

== Awards ==
In 1969, the city of Ljubljana gave the theatre the Župančič Award for special achievements as an “exceptional example of communal creative will for quality conveying theatre art to wider circles”. In 2008, the European Commission awarded the theatre the honorary title of European Cultural Ambassador, on the grounds of its international activity and the quality of its performances.

== See also ==
- Diego de Brea
- Matjaž Pograjc
- Dragan Živadinov
- Dušan Jovanović
- Tomi Janežič
- Vinko Möderndorfer

== Bibliography ==
- Has the Future Already Arrived? 50 Years of Mladinsko Theatre (Slovensko mladinsko gledališče, Ljubljana, 2007)
- Tomaž Toporišič: The spatial machines and Slovene (no longer-) theatre, Maska, Spring 2008.
- Tomaž Toporišič: Artaud's Theatre of Cruelty and Subversive Strategies of Today's Art, Polona Tratnik (ed.): Art, Resistance, Subversion, Madness, Monitor, Koper, Annales, 2009.
- Spatial machines and Slovene (no longer-) experimental theatre in the second half of the 20th century, in Occupying spaces: experimental theatre in Central Europe: 1950–2010, I. Svetina, T. Toporišič, T. Rogelj (ed.), SGM: Ljubljana, 2011: 418–468.
