= Der Faust =

German theatre award

- Awarded for: Excellence in German theatre
- Country: Germany
- Presented by: Deutscher Bühnenverein
- First award: 2006
- Website: derfaust-theaterpreis.de

Der Faust, officially Deutscher Theaterpreis Der Faust, is a German theatre prize, a national prize from 2006. It is awarded annually by the organizations Deutscher Bühnenverein, Kulturstiftung der Länder, Deutsche Akademie der Darstellenden Künste and the state in which the award ceremony is held. The trophy was designed by the Austrian stage designer Erich Wonder.

A jury of mostly members of the Bühnenverein considers proposals from theatres which may not name their own productions. The Jury selects three nominations per category, from which members of the Deutschen Akademie der Darstellenden Künste elect the winners. The prize is awarded in eight categories:

- Regie Schauspiel (direction play)
- Darstellerin/Darsteller Schauspiel (performer play)
- Regie Musiktheater (direction opera)
- Sängerdarstellerin/Sängerdarsteller Musiktheater (performer opera)
- Choreografie (choreography)
- Darstellerin/Darsteller Tanz (dancer)
- Regie Kinder- und Jugendtheater (direction children's and youth theatre)
- Bühne/Kostüm (stage / costumes)

Additional optional awards are a prize for a life's work (Lebenswerk) and Preis der Präsidentin (prize of the [female] president).

== Award ceremonies ==
The award ceremonies have taken place at alternating locations, presented by notable actors:

- Der Faust 2006 in Essen, Nordrhein-Westfalen, moderation: Rufus Beck
  - Evelyn Herlitzius (performer opera)
  - Meg Stuart (choreography)
- Der Faust 2007 in Munich, Bavaria, moderation: Peter Jordan and Bernd Moss
  - Angela Denoke (performer opera)
- Der Faust 2008 in Stuttgart, Baden-Württemberg, moderation: Wiebke Puls and Bernd Moss
  - Christof Loy (direction opera)
  - Iris Vermillion (performer opera)
  - William Forsythe (choreography)
- Der Faust 2009 in Mainz, Rheinland-Pfalz, moderation: Inga Busch and Gustav Peter Wöhler
  - Barrie Kosky (direction opera)
  - Michael Volle (performer opera)
- Der Faust 2010 in Essen, moderation: Samuel Finzi and Wolfram Koch
  - Claus Guth (direction opera)
  - Sophie Rois (performer play)
  - Eva-Maria Westbroek (performer opera)
- Der Faust 2011 in Frankfurt, Hesse, moderation: Michael Quast
  - Martin Wuttke (performer play)
  - Claudia Barainsky (performer opera)
  - Neco Celik (direction children's and youth theatre)
- Der Faust 2012 in Erfurt, Thuringia, moderation: Dominique Horwitz
  - Martin Kušej (direction opera)
- Der Faust 2013 in Berlin, moderation: Peter Jordan
  - Claus Guth (direction opera)
  - Christian Gerhaher (performer opera)
  - Bridget Breiner (choreography)
- Der Faust 2014 in Hamburg, moderation: Ulrich Matthes
  - Evelyn Herlitzius (performer opera)
  - Aleksandar Denić (stage)
- Der Faust 2015 in Saarbrücken, moderation: Bernd Moss
  - Ulrich Matthes (performer drama)
  - Andrea Breth (direction opera)
  - Barbara Hannigan (performer opera)
  - Bridget Breiner (choreography)
- Der Faust 2016 in Freiburg, moderation: Milan Peschel
  - Frank Castorf (direction drama)
  - Peter Konwitschny (direction opera)
  - Nicole Chevalier (performer opera)
- Der Faust 2017 in Leipzig, moderation: Christian Friedel
  - Christoph Marthaler (direction opera)
- Der Faust 2018 in Regensburg, Bavaria, moderation: Genija Rykova
  - Tobias Kratzer (direction opera)
- Der Faust 2019 in Kassel, Hesse, moderation: Wiebke Puls
  - Johannes Martin Kränzle (performer opera)
  - Anne Teresa De Keersmaeker (choreography)
- Der Faust 2022 in Düsseldorf, moderation: André Kaczmarczyk
  - Marlis Petersen (performer opera)
- Der Faust 2023 in Hamburg
  - Fritzi Haberlandt (performer drama)
  - David Hermann (direction opera)
- Der Faust 2024 in Gera, moderation: Maria Popov, Vidina Popov
  - Asmik Grigorian (performer opera)
- Der Faust 2025 in Stuttgart
  - William Forsythe (choreography)

== Lifetime achievement ==
- 2006: George Tabori
- 2007: Michael Gielen
- 2008: Volker Ludwig
- 2009: Pina Bausch (posthumous)
- 2010: Wilfried Minks
- 2011: Wolfgang Engel
- 2012: Tankred Dorst, Ursula Ehler
- 2013: Inge Keller
- 2014: Maria Müller-Sommer
- 2015: Franz Mazura
- 2016: Hans Neuenfels
- 2017: Elfriede Jelinek
- 2018: Aribert Reimann
- 2019: Roberto Ciulli
- 2020: William Forsythe
- 2021: Nicole Heesters
- 2022: Achim Freyer
- 2023: Klaus Zehelein
- 2024: Nele Hertling
- 2025: Brigitte Dethier
- 2026: Brigitte Fassbaender
