= Tena Štivičić =

Croatian playwright

- Born: 5 September 1977 (age 48); Zagreb, Croatia
- Education: Academy of Drama Art, Zagreb; Goldsmiths College
- Occupations: Playwright, screenwriter, professor lecturer
- Spouse: Douglas Henshall (m. 2010)
- Children: 1
- Writing career
- Notable awards: Susan Smith Blackburn Prize; Order of Danica Hrvatska

Tena Štivičić (pronounced [tɛ̝̌ːna ʃtîv̞itʃitɕ]; born 1977) is a Croatian playwright and screenwriter. She won the 2014-2015 Susan Smith Blackburn Prize.

== Early life and education ==
She was born in Zagreb where she studied at the Academy of Dramatic Art. She completed an MA in Writing for Performance at Goldsmiths College, University of London.

== Career ==
She has taken part in theatre events such as Future Perfect, the Paines Plough Young Writers Programme and the Royal Court's 50th Anniversary season. Štivičić has written plays both in her native Croatian and in English.

Her major works in English include: Can't Escape Sundays, Perceval, Psssst, Two of Us, Goldoni Terminus, Fragile!, and Fireflies. Her plays have been produced in at least ten European countries. Fragile!, directed by Matjaž Pograjc and produced by Mladinsko Theatre, has won several awards at festivals in Croatia and Slovenia. In 2007, she co-wrote the play Pijana noć 1918 (Drunken Night 1918) with her father Ivo Štivičić for the Ulysses Theatre, Zagreb. Her project Goldoni Terminus was shown at the 2007 Venice Biennale.

Her play 3 Winters premiered at National Theatre in London, and won Štivičić the 2015 Susan Smith Blackburn Prize.

== Family ==
Tena Štivičić lives in London and is married to Scottish actor Douglas Henshall.
