= Tanju Girişken =

Turkish theatre director

Tanju Girişken (born 1989) is a Turkish theatre director, writer and actor. Born in İzmir, Turkey, he has worked at various theatres in Turkey and Germany.

== Early life and education ==
Girişken was born in 1989 in İzmir, Turkey. He studied acting at Istanbul University and graduated in 2012. From 2020 to 2023, he studied directing in the master's programme at the Theaterakademie August Everding in Munich.

== Career ==
While studying directing in Munich, Girişken staged ruhen in resistance. antigone and befristet / für immer at the Theaterakademie August Everding. befristet / für immer, a documentary theatre work, was later presented at the Münchner Kammerspiele and won the audience award at the Körber Studio Junge Regie in Hamburg in 2023.

In 2024, he directed Georg Büchner's Leonce and Lena at Deutsches Theater Göttingen. In 2025, he directed the devised theatre work Null Zucker at Schauspiel Dortmund. Reviewing the production for Die Deutsche Bühne, Sarah Heppekausen described it as an exploration of multilingual everyday life and of language as both barrier and bridge.

Also in 2025, Girişken directed a stage adaptation of Emine Sevgi Özdamar's novel Die Brücke vom Goldenen Horn at Theater Osnabrück, with a theatre adaptation by Girişken and dramaturg Sophie Hein. A review in taz described the production as telling a story of transit between two worlds and noted its focus on identity, transcultural experience, language and political violence.

In 2026, Girişken directed Felicia Zeller's Der Fiskus at Theater Trier. He also directed Ibrahim Amir's Das Opferfest at Stadttheater Gießen. His work Mutter dili – alle Farben meiner Sprachen was premiered at Nationaltheater Mannheim. In 2026, he directed Stefan Wipplinger's Kri as part of the Salzburg Festival's youth programme jung & jede*r.

Several of Girişken's productions have addressed migration, multilingualism and belonging.

== Selected productions ==
=== Directing and writing ===
- ruhen in resistance. antigone, Bayerische Theaterakademie August Everding, director and writer
- befristet / für immer, Bayerische Theaterakademie August Everding and Münchner Kammerspiele, director
- Leonce und Lena, by Georg Büchner, Deutsches Theater Göttingen, director, 2024
- Null Zucker, Schauspiel Dortmund, director, 2025
- Die Brücke vom Goldenen Horn, after Emine Sevgi Özdamar, Theater Osnabrück, director and co-adapter, 2025
- Wolf, after Saša Stanišić, Residenztheater München, director
- Der Fiskus, by Felicia Zeller, Theater Trier, director, 2026
- Das Opferfest, by Ibrahim Amir, Stadttheater Gießen, director, 2026
- Mutter dili – alle Farben meiner Sprachen, Nationaltheater Mannheim, writer and director, 2026
- Kri, by Stefan Wipplinger, Salzburg Festival, director, 2026

=== Acting ===
- Lö Grand Bal Almanya, directed by Nurkan Erpulat, Maxim Gorki Theater, Berlin, actor
- Cyrano de Bergerac, Istanbul City Theatre, actor
- The Glass Menagerie, Istanbul City Theatre, actor

== Awards and recognition ==
- 2023: Audience Award, Körber Studio Junge Regie, for befristet / für immer
