= Janežič =

Janežič is a Slovene surname. Notable people with the surname include:

- Anton Janežič (1828–1869), Carinthian Slovene linguist and philologist
- Luka Janežič (born 1995), Slovenian sprinter
- Tomi Janežič (born 1972), Slovenian theatre director
