= Ivo Svetina =

Slovene poet, playwright and translator (born c. 1948)

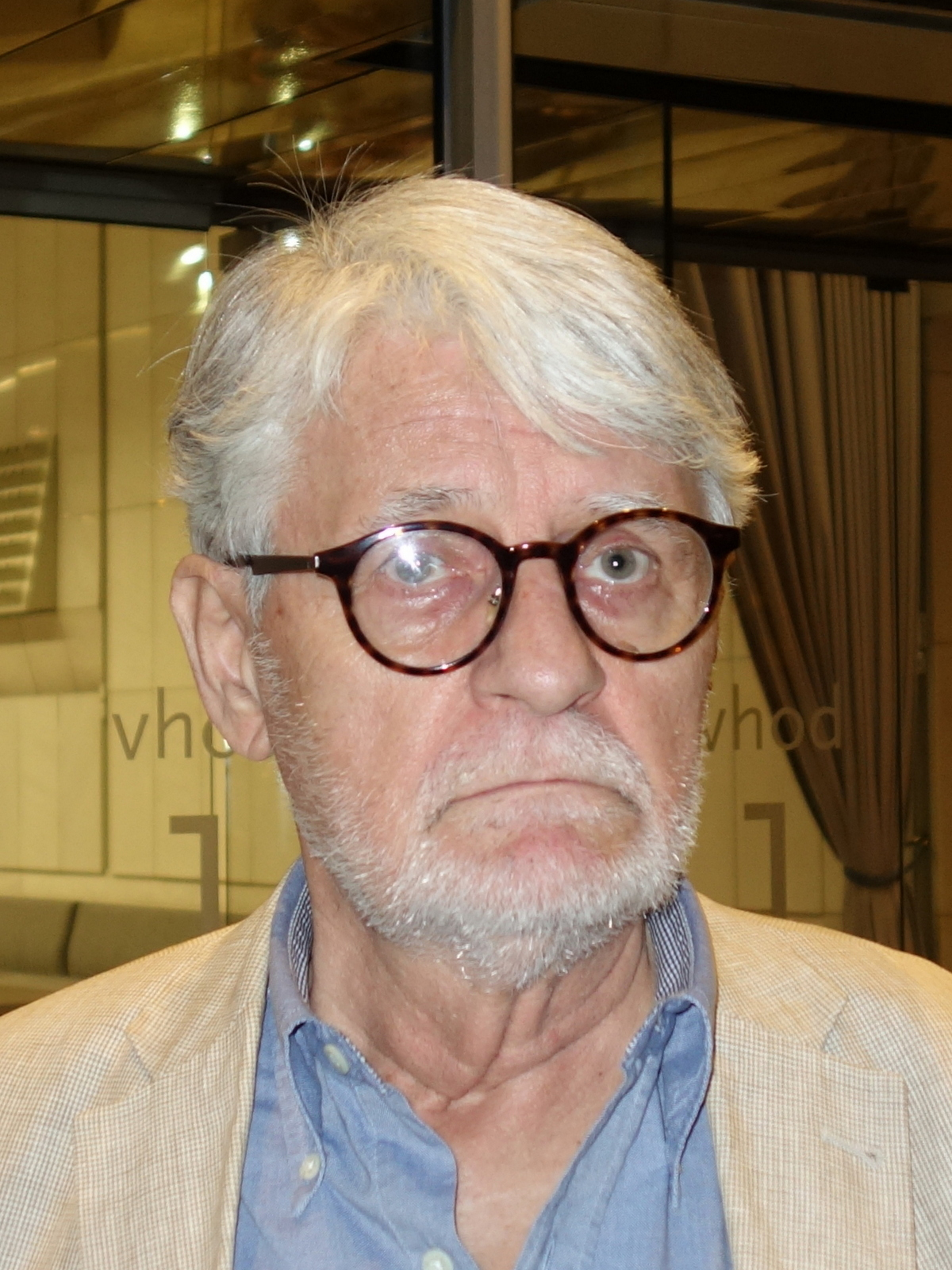
- Ivo Svetina
- Born: 9 September 1948 (age 77); Ljubljana, Socialist Federal Republic of Yugoslavia (now in Slovenia)
- Occupations: poet, playwright, translator
- Writing career
- Notable works: Botticelli, Peti rokopisi, Sfingin hlev, Lesbos
- Notable awards: Prešeren Foundation Award; 1988 for Peti rokopisi Jenko Award; 2001 for Sfingin hlev Veronika Award; 2005 for Lesbos

Ivo Svetina (born 9 September 1948) is a Slovene poet, playwright and translator. He has won numerous awards for his plays and poetry collections. In 1998 he was appointed the Director of the National Theatre Museum of Slovenia. In 2014 he was elected President of the Slovene Writers' Association.

Svetina was born in Ljubljana in 1948. He studied comparative literature at the University of Ljubljana and worked in numerous experimental theatre companies in the late 1960s and 1970s. He worked at RTV Slovenia and the Mladinsko Theatre.

He won the Prešeren Foundation Award in 1988 for his poetry collection Peti rokopisi and in 2010 the Jenko Award for his poetry collection Sfingin hlev.

== Selected works ==
=== Poetry collections ===
- Plovi na jagodi pupa magnolija do zlatih vladnih palač (1971)
- Heliks in Tibija (1973)
- Botticelli (1975)
- Vaša partijska ljubezen, Očetje! Herojska smrt življenje (1976)
- Joni (1976)
- Dissertationes (1977)
- Bulbul (1982)
- Marija in živali (1986)
- Péti rokopisi (1987)
- Knjiga očetove smrti: videnja, izreki 1989 (1990)
- Almagest (1991)
- Disciplina bolečine: stance praznine (1993)
- Glasovi snega (1993)
- Disciplina bolečine (1993)
- Zakoni vode in lesa: 1993-1995 (1997)
- Svitanice (1998)
- Svit (2000)
- Stihi, videnja, izreki (2001)
- Oblak in gora (2003)
- Pesmi nevednosti (2004)
- Lesbos (2005)
- Vrt pozabe (2005)
- Na obali oceana tovarna poezije (2008)
- Pes in Perzijci (2008)
- Stimmen slowenischer Lyrik 2 (2008)
- Sfingin hlev (2010)

=== Plays ===
- Lepotica in zver ali Kaj se je zgodilo z Danico D.? (1985)
- Biljard na Capriju/Šeherezada (1989)
- Zgodba iz južnega gozda ali Kdo je ubil sonce (1989)
- Tibetanska knjiga mrtvih (1992)
- Kamen in zrno (1993)
- Vrtovi in golobica (1994)
- Zarika in sončnica (1995)
- Tako je umrl Zaratuštra (1996)
- Babilon (1996)
- Ojdip v Korintu (1999)

=== Children's literature ===
- Aves, ptičji kralj (1990)
- Pravljica o jari kači (1990)
- Deček in muha (1990)
- Kozel vrtnar (1993)
- Belin (1997)
