= Dušan Jovanović (theatre director) =

Slovene theatre director (1939–2021)

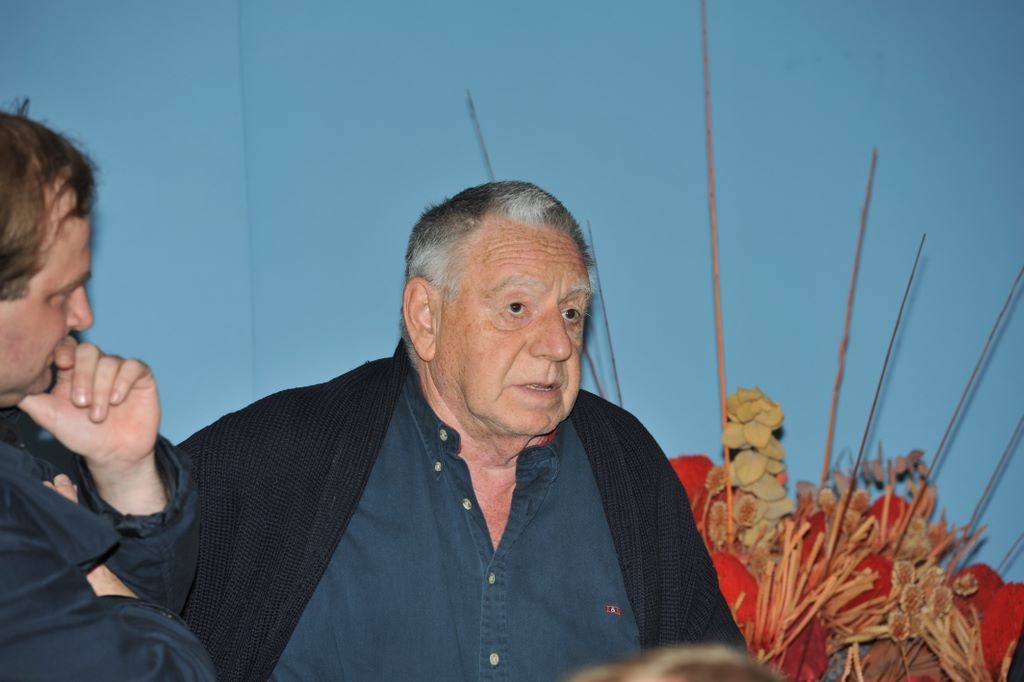
- Dušan Jovanović in 2010
- Born: 1 October 1939; Belgrade, Kingdom of Yugoslavia (now in Serbia)
- Died: 1 January 2021 (aged 81); Ljubljana, Slovenia
- Occupations: Theatre director, playwright and essayist
- Writing career
- Notable awards: Prešeren Foundation Award; 1979 for his direction of Kralj na Betajnovi; Prešeren Award; 1990 for his theatrical opus of recent years Rožanc Award; 2008 for Svet je drama

Dušan Jovanović (1 October 1939 – 1 January 2021) was a Slovene theatre director, playwright and essayist, known for his experimental and grotesque satirical theatre. Since 2005 he was also the president of the Prešeren Foundation.

Jovanović was born in Belgrade in 1939, just before the outbreak of the Second World War. After the war he moved to Ljubljana with his father and went on to study English and French at the University of Ljubljana and also graduated in stage direction from the Academy for Theatre, Radio, Film and Television. In the late 1960s and 1970s he participated in numerous experimental theatre groups and was artistic director at the Mladinsko Theatre between 1978 and 1985. Since 1989 he was also assistant professor at the Academy for Theatre, Radio, Film and Television. He was also author of numerous film and TV scripts.

Since the late 1990s Jovanović became also an acclaimed columnist and essayist. In 2008 he received the Rožanc Award for his essay collection Svet je drama (The World is a Drama).

== Published works ==
=== Prose ===
- Don Juan na psu ali Zdrav duh v zdravem telesu, 1969

=== Plays ===
- Predstave ne bo, 1963
- Norci, 1968
- Znamke, nakar še Emilija, 1969
- Igrajte tumor v glavi in onesnaževanje zraka, 1971
- Življenje podeželskih plejbojev po drugi svetovni vojni ali tuje hočemo, svojega ne damo, 1972
- Žrtve mode bum bum, 1975
- Generacije, 1977
- Vojaška skrivnost, 1983
- Osvoboditev Skopja, 1977
- Karamazovi, 1980
- Viktor ali dan mladosti, 1989
- Jasnovidka ali Dan mrtvih, 1989
- Zid, jezero, 1989
- Antigona, 1996
- Uganka korajže, 1994
- Kdo to poje Sizifa, 1997
- Karajan C/Klinika Kozarcky/Ekshibicionist, 1999
- Ekshibicionist, under the pseudonym O. J. Traven, 2001

=== Essay collections ===
- Paberki, 1996
- Moški, ženska, 2000
- Sobotna knjiga, 2005
- Svet je drama, 2007
