= Tobias Kratzer =

German stage director

- Born: 17 January 1980 (age 46); Landshut, Bavaria, Germany
- Education: Bayerische Theaterakademie
- Occupation: Stage director
- Awards: Österreichischer Musiktheaterpreis; Oper! Award

Tobias Kratzer (born 17 January 1980) is a German stage director, especially of opera, who has worked internationally after winning a competition in Graz with two entries in 2008. He has staged works by Verdi and Wagner, but also contemporary music. He directed Wagner's Tannhäuser for the opening of the 2019 Bayreuth Festival.

== Career ==
Born in Landshut, Kratzer studied art history in Munich and Bern. After completion, he turned to studying direction of plays and musical theatre at the Bayerische Theaterakademie August Everding. His first productions were at the Akademietheater, Munich, in 2006 Brecht/Weill's Die sieben Todsünden and in 2008 Werner Egk's Die Verlobung in St. Domingo. Also in 2006, he staged at the Reaktorhalle of the University of Music and Theatre Munich Verdi's La traviata, working for the first time with stage designer Rainer Sellmaier from Regensburg and the conductor Martin Wettges with whom he has frequently collaborated.

The team, called ATEF, won prizes at the competition "Ring Award" in Graz with productions of Verdi's Rigoletto. Kratzer had nominated two stagings under two pseudonyms, as Ginger Holiday, an American female director, and as Pedrak Topola from Bulgaria. Following the attention at the competition, the team received commissions from several opera houses; they directed in 2009 at the Bavarian State Opera Mozart's Così fan tutte, at the Theater Heidelberg his Die Zauberflöte, at the Wermland Opera in Karlstad, Sweden again Rigoletto, and in 2010 at the Leipzig Opera Handel's Admeto, and at the Graz Opera Bellini's La sonnambula.

In the 2010/11 season, Kratzer staged Der Rosenkavalier by Richard Strauss at the Theater Bremen, Donizetti's Anna Bolena at the Lucerne theatre, which was nominated as "Opera of the Year" by Opernwelt, and Telemaco at the Schwetzingen Festival and the Theater Basel. The following season, Kratzer staged Wagner's Tannhäuser at the Theater Bremen, a scenic version of Bach's St John Passion at the Wermland Opera, and Erkki-Sven Tüür's Wallenberg at the Staatstheater Karlsruhe.

His staging of Lehar's Die Csárdásfürstin at the Stadttheater Klagenfurt was nominated for the 2015 Österreichischer Musiktheaterpreis in the category "Beste Regie" (Best direction). His production of Wagner's Die Meistersinger von Nürnberg at the Badisches Staatstheater Karlsruhe was nominated for the award Der Faust. In 2018, he directed a new production of Meyerbeer's L'Africaine – Vasco da Gama at the Oper Frankfurt as an interstellar drama of colonialism ("interstellares Kolonialismusdrama"). Conducted by Antonello Manacorda, with Michael Spyres, Claudia Mahnke and Kirsten MacKinnon in leading roles, the story was told as a combination of directing the characters, visionary images and sound magic ("Personenregie, Bildvision und Klangzauber"). He earned the Der Faust award for Wagner's Götterdämmerung, again in Karlsruhe.

Kratzer directed Wagner's Tannhäuser for the opening performance of the 2019 Bayreuth Festival. It earned him the 2020 Oper! Award, regarded by the jury as a "clever, interpretative piece of entertainment" because he included the history of the Bayreuth Festival in a play within a play.

He directed Die ersten Menschen, the only opera by Rudi Stephan, premiered at the Oper Frankfurt in 1920, there in 2023, with Andreas Bauer Kanabas as Adam, Ambur Braid as Eve, Iain MacNeil as Cain and Ian Koziara as Abel, conducted by Sebastian Weigle; a reviewer described the production as of "archaic force, biblical depth and even a pinch of humour".

Kratzer is the designated Intendant of the Hamburg State Opera in the 2025/26 season. He directed Monster's Paradise, a satire/horror opera about a king-president in an oval office.
