= Ingrid Figur =

German soprano and singing teacher

- Born: Ingrid Eleonore Auguste Manns; October 1, 1936; Berlin, Germany
- Died: July 15, 2025 (aged 88) Berlin, Germany
- Cause of death: Natural causes
- Genres: Lied, Oratorio
- Occupations: Soprano, singing teacher
- Years active: 1960s–2025

Ingrid Figur (born as Ingrid Eleonore Auguste Manns; October 1, 1936 in Berlin; July 15, 2025) was a German soprano and singing teacher.

== Career ==
Born in Berlin, Figur studied in her hometown, first German studies, then music at school to become a teacher, finally followed by her singing studies. She then began a career, both in the repertoire of the lied and the oratorio, in and outside Germany.

Since 1974, she has been teaching singing at the Berlin University of the Arts, and as a professor from 1980 to 1999. Figur trained many of the singers known today at national and international level. Among her students are in particular Claudia Barainsky, Merav Barnea, Stella Doufexis, Ursula Hesse, Andrea Long, Sebastian Noack, Gundula Hintz, Christine Schäfer, Mojca Erdmann, Stefanie Kunschke and Tim Severloh.

Particularly noteworthy is her long collaboration and membership to the Internationale Bachakademie Stuttgart, as well as the Berlin nichi-doku Liederkreis (Deutsch-japanische Sommerakademie für Gesang und Liedbegleitung). In addition, she gives numerous master classes in Germany and other countries. Figur died of natural causes on July 15, 2025, in her native Berlin, Germany, at the age of 88.
