= Evelyn Herlitzius =

German opera singer (born 1963)

- Born: 27 April 1963 (age 63); Osnabrück, West Germany
- Education: Musikhochschule Hamburg
- Occupation: Operatic dramatic soprano
- Organizations: Semperoper; Bayreuth Festival
- Awards: Gramophone Classical Music Awards; International Opera Awards; Deutscher Theaterpreis Der Faust

Evelyn Herlitzius (born 27 April 1963) is an internationally leading German high dramatic soprano, who performs in concert and opera alike. She is a foremost interpreter in the principal roles of works by Richard Strauss and Richard Wagner, singing Dyer's Wife, Elektra, Salome, Brünnhilde, Sieglinde, Ortrud, Kundry, Elisabeth, Venus, Isolde Bayreuther Festspiele, Festival d'Aix-en-Provence, Salzburger Festspiele and all internationally leading opera houses.

== Career ==
Born in Osnabrück, Herlitzius first trained to be a dancer. She then studied voice with Hans Kagel and Eckart Lindemann at the Musikhochschule Hamburg. Her debut on the opera stage was as Elisabeth in Wagner's Tannhäuser at the Landestheater Flensburg. After a year she became a member of the Hamburgische Staatsoper.

=== Semperoper ===
Herlitzius was a member of the Semperoper in Dresden from 1997 to 2000, singing major parts such as Janáček's Jenůfa, both Elisabeth and Venus in Tannhäuser, Sieglinde and Brünnhilde in Wagner's Der Ring des Nibelungen, Kundry in his Parsifal, the dyer's wife in Die Frau ohne Schatten by Richard Strauss, his Salome and Puccini's Turandot. The title role in Strauss' Elektra earned her a second Faust award for excellent acting as a singer. In 2014/15 she appeared as Leonore in Beethoven's Fidelio.

=== Bayreuth ===
Her debut at the Bayreuth Festival was in 2002 the part of Brünnhilde in Wagner's Ring, repeated in the following years. In 2006 and 2007 she was Kundry in Parsifal, in 2010 Ortrud in Lohengrin. In 2015 she stepped in as Isolde in Tristan und Isolde for the opening of the festival, staged by Katharina Wagner and conducted by Christian Thielemann. Martin Kettle wrote in The Guardian of her "radiant account of the scene" closing the work.

=== Guest performances ===
Herlitzius performed as a guest at the major opera houses: Gutrune in Wagner's Götterdämmerung at the Badisches Staatstheater Karlsruhe, Marie in Berg's Wozzeck and Leonore in Beethoven's Fidelio at the Saarländisches Staatstheater in Saarbrücken, Leonore also at the Bregenzer Festspiele of 1996, Venus in Henze's Venus und Adonis at the Bayerische Staatsoper, Sieglinde in Wagner's Die Walküre, conducted by Giuseppe Sinopoli at the Accademia di Santa Cecilia in Rome, and Isolde at the Aalto Theatre in Essen. In 2010 she performed the title role in Janáček's Katja Kabanowa at the Théâtre de la Monnaie. She appeared as Elektra at the Aix-en-Provence 2013, in the last production of stage director Patrice Chéreau. A reviewer called her Elektra "a creature of mesmerising intensity", and wrote "Singing tirelessly and trenchantly – her top notes searing, her delivery of the text pellucid – Herlitzius nails all the character's lithe foxy intelligence and never sinks to histrionic ham or rant." In 2018, she made her long-awaited US debut as Kundry in Parsifal at the Metropolitan Opera.

=== Teaching ===
Herlitzius has also worked as a voice teacher. Her students have included Mojca Erdmann.

== Personal life ==
Since 1999, Evelyn Herlitzius has been living in Dresden. She has two sons.

== Awards ==
• 2024: Gramophone Classical Music Awards
• 2024: Induction into Sächsische Akademie der Künste
• 2024: International Classical Music Awards
• 2017: Premios de la Crítica de Amics del Liceu
• 2015: Gramophone Classical Music Awards
• 2015: International Opera Awards
• 2015: Nomination for Grammy Awards

• 2014:Rudi Häussler Prize
• 2014: Diapason d’or de l’année
• 2014: Deutscher Theaterpreis Der Faust
• 2014: Prix Caecilia
• 2013: Franco Abbiati Prize
• 2010: Prix du Syndicat de la critique
• 2006: Deutscher Theaterpreis Der Faust
• 2002: Sächsische Kammersängerin
• 1999: Christel-Goltz Prize
• 1993: First Prize at the International Vocal Competition Die Meistersinger von Nürnberg
• 1990s: Induction into Deutsche Akademie der Darstellenden Künste

== Repertoire ==
=== Opera ===
Over the course of her career, Evelyn Herlitzius has sung the following opera roles:

- Bartók: A kékszakállú herceg vára (Judith)
- Beethoven: Fidelio (Leonore)
- Berg: Wozzeck (Marie)
- Berlioz]]: Les Troyens (Cassandre)
- Henze: Venus und Adonis (Primadonna)
- Hindemith: Cardillac (Die Dame)
- Adriana Hölszky: Giuseppe e Sylvia (Sylvia)
- Humperdinck: Hänsel und Gretel (Die Knusperhexe)
- Janáček:
  - Jenůfa (Jenůfa and Kostelnička Buryjovka)
  - Káťa Kabanová (Káťa and Marfa Ignatěvna Kabanová)
  - Věc Makropulos (Emilia Marty)
- Mascagni: Cavalleria rusticana (Santuzza)
- Penderecki: Die Teufel von Loudon (Jeanne)
- Poulenc: Dialogues des Carmélites (Madame de Croissy)
- Prokofiev: Ognenny angel (Renata)
- Puccini: Turandot (Turandot)
- Torsten Rasch: Die andere Frau (Sarai)
- Reimann: Lear (Goneril und Regan)
- Schönberg: Erwartung (The Woman)
- Shostakovich: Lady Macbeth of the Mtsensk District (Katerina Lvovna Izmailova)
- Johann Strauss: Die Fledermaus (Rosalinde)
- Richard Strauss:
  - Die Frau ohne Schatten (Die Amme and the Wife)
  - Elektra (Elektra and Klytämnestra)
  - Salome (Herodias and Salome)
- Manfred Trojahn: Orest (Elektra)
- Tchaikovski: Pikovaya dama (Grafinya)
- Verdi:
  - Macbeth (Lady Macbeth)
  - Oberto (Leonora)
- Richard Wagner|Wagner, Richard]]: Der fliegende Holländer (Senta)
- Wagner:
  - Die Walküre (Brünnhilde, Ortlinde, Sieglinde)
  - Götterdämmerung (Brünnhilde, Gutrune)
  - Lohengrin (Ortrud)
  - Parsifal (Kundry)
  - Siegfried (Brünnhilde)
  - Tannhäuser (Elisabeth and Venus)
  - Tristan und Isolde (Isolde)
- Weber: Euryanthe (Eglantine)
- Kurt Weill: Aufstieg und Fall der Stadt Mahagonny (Leokadja Begbick)

== Discography ==
• Beethoven, Ludwig van: Fidelio [Excerpts] (World Orchestra for Peace, Sir Georg Solti) [1995]
• Janáček, Leoš: Jenůfa (Staatskapelle Berlin, Sir Simon Rattle) [2022]
• Janáček, Leoš: Káťa Kabanová (Wiener Philharmoniker, Jakub Hrůša) [2023]
• Schoenberg, Arnold: Erwartung (Berliner Philharmoniker, Sir Simon Rattle) [2009]
• Schoenberg, Arnold: Erwartung (Wiener Philharmoniker, Giuseppe Sinopoli) [1998]
• Strauss, Richard: Die Frau ohne Schatten (Orchester der Wiener Staatsoper, Christian Thielemann) [2020]
• Strauss, Richard: Die Frau ohne Schatten (Wiener Philharmoniker, Christian Thielemann) [2012]
• Strauss, Richard: Elektra (Staatskapelle Dresden, Christian Thielemann) [2014]
• Strauss, Richard: Elektra (Orchestre de Paris, Esa-Pekka Salonen) [2014]
• Strauss, Richard: Elektra (Nederlands Philharmonisch Orkest, Marc Albrecht) [2012]
• Verdi, Giuseppe: Oberto (Orchestra Sinfónica del Principado de Asturias, Yves Abel) [2007]
• Wagner, Richard: Die Walküre (Magyar Rádió Szimfonikus Zenekara, Ádám Fischer) [2017]
• Wagner, Richard: Die Walküre (Berliner Philharmoniker, Sir Simon Rattle) [2012]
• Wagner, Richard: Lohengrin (Staatskapelle Dresden, Christian Thielemann) [2017]
• Wagner, Richard: Tristan und Isolde (Bayreuther Festspielorchester, Christian Thielemann) [2016]
