= Cronaca del luogo =

Opera by Luciano Berio

- Opera by Luciano Berio
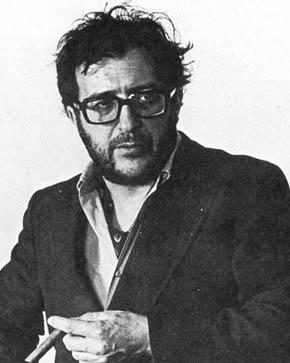
- The composer in the 1970s
- Description: azione musicale
- Translation: Chronicle of the Place
- Librettist: Talia Pecker Berio
- Language: Italian
- Based on: Rabbinic literature and poetry by Paul Celan and Marina Tsvetayeva
- Premiere: 24 July 1999; Felsenreitschule, Salzburg

Cronaca del luogo (Chronicle of the Place) is an opera by Luciano Berio. The Italian libretto was compiled by his wife, Talia Pecker Berio, incorporating excerpts from Rabbinic literature and the poetry of Paul Celan and Marina Tsvetayeva. Berio himself described the work as an azione musicale (musical action) rather than an opera. It falls into five scenes and a prologue. The work received its premiere at the Felsenreitschule, Salzburg, on 24 July 1999, directed by Claus Guth. Sylvain Cambreling conducted the soloists, the Tölzer Knabenchor and Arnold Schoenberg Chor, Centro Tempo Reale for the live electronics and the ensemble Klangforum Wien.

== Roles ==
Role	Voice type	Premiere cast, 13 August 1999 (Conductor: Sylvain Cambreling)
R	soprano	Hildegard Behrens
General	baritone	Frode Olsen
Phanuel	tenor	Matthias Klink
Nino	baritone	David Moss
Orvid	mezzo-soprano	Monica Bacelli
A man without age	baritone	Urban Malmberg
Sindaco	baritone	Martin Blasius
3 Construction workers	tenor	Fritz Steinbacher
	baritone	Martin Haltrich
	baritone	Tore Denys
Woman in labor	soprano	Carolina Astanel
Saphir	trumpet	Gabriele Cassone
Abulafia	trombone	Christian Lindberg
