= Bayerische Theaterakademie August Everding =

German theatre school

Coordinates: 48°08′20″N 11°36′20″E

The Bayerische Theaterakademie August Everding (Bavarian Theatre Academy August Everding) at the Prinzregententheater in Munich, was founded by August Everding in 1993. The academy offers theatrical students eight different programs and through the cooperation of three professionally equipped theaters (Prinzregententheater, Akademietheater, and Akademiestudio), it is the largest training center for stage professions in Germany.

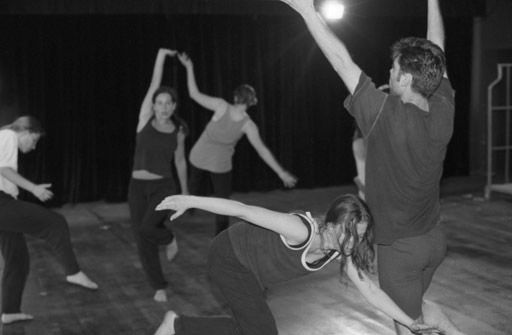
Students of the Bayerische Theaterakademie August Everding, 1998

== Education ==
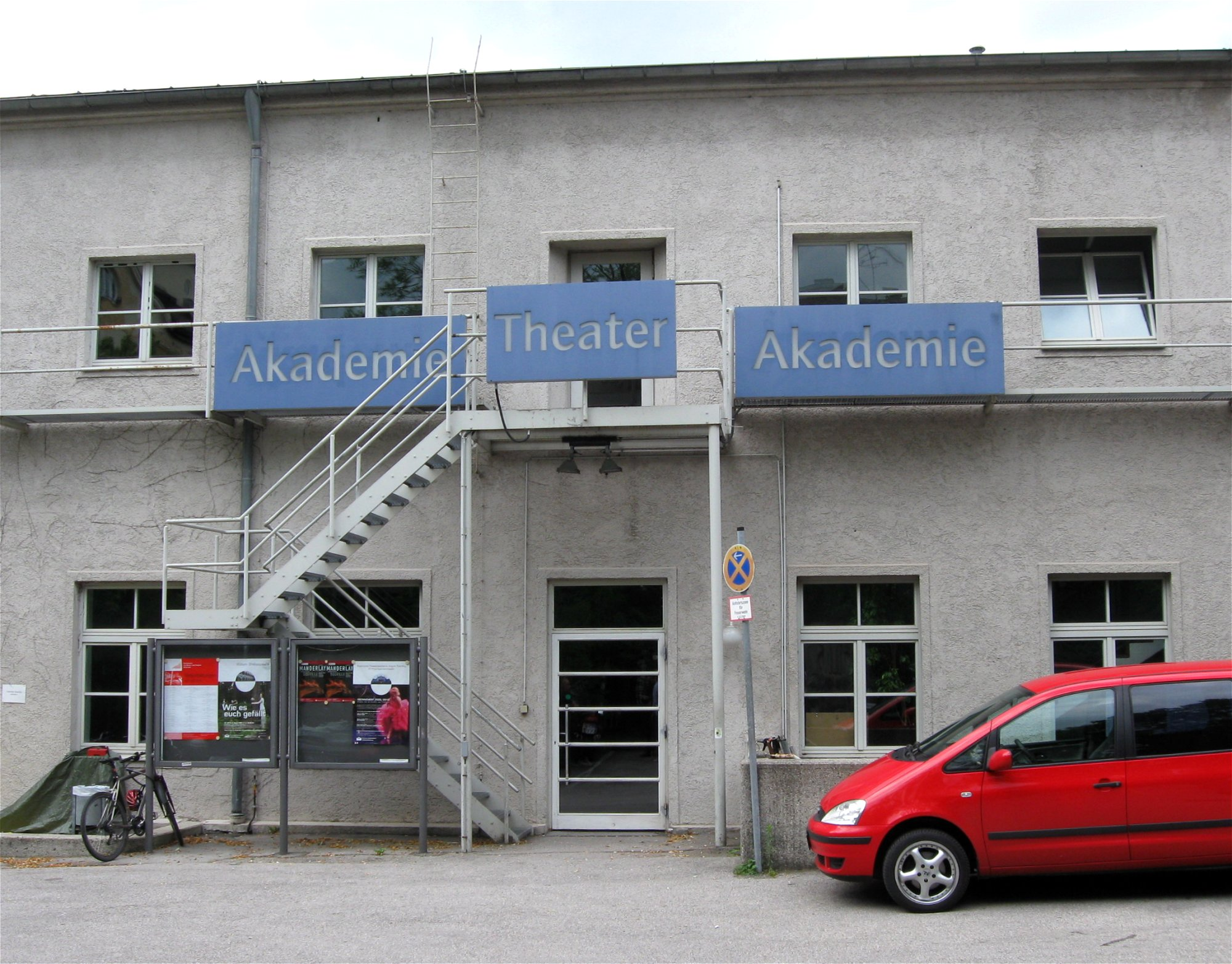
Akademietheater

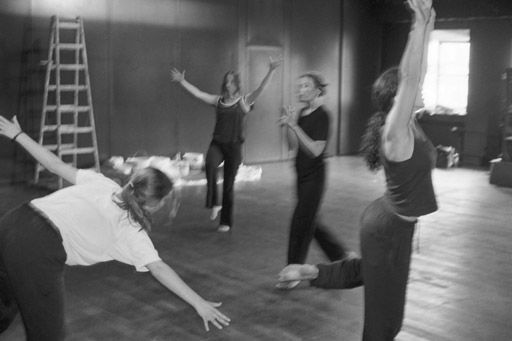
Students of the Theaterakademie performing exercises for body and spatial awareness, 1998

In this theater for teaching and learning combinations of both theoretical and practical methods make up the courses for acting, directing, singing/musical theater, musicals, drama, stage presence and costume design, makeup and cultural journalism. The students complete their studies, depending on the various courses, with a Bachelor, Master or Diploma.

Cooperation partners are the Hochschule für Musik und Theater München, LMU Munich and the Academy of Fine Arts, Munich in which students are enrolled depending on the course.

Moreover, there are production partnerships with the three state theaters in Munich (Residenz Theatre, Bavarian State Opera, and Staatstheater am Gärtnerplatz), the Bayerischer Rundfunk, the Munich Radio Orchestra, the Munich Chamber Orchestra, the Neue Hofkapelle München and Bavarian, national and international theaters and festivals.

On average, the students participate in over 50 productions per academic year. Tickets for performances are available through the central ticket office of the Bavarian state theaters.

The Theatre Academy is a member of the Standing Conference of Acting Training because of its course in acting.

== Support and funding ==
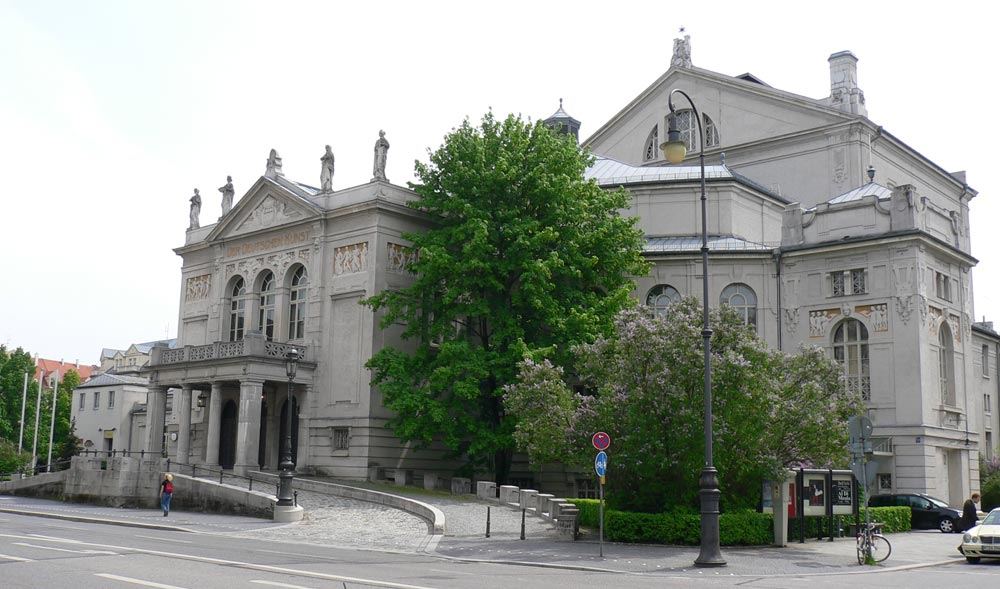
Prinzregententheater

When the Prinzregententheater is not being used for its own productions, the Theaterakademie rents the building to cooperation partners and Munich concert promoters. The income from renting finances about 12 percent of the academy’s total budget. Supporter of the Bayerische Theaterakademie August Everding is the Free State of Bavaria, represented by the Bavarian State Ministry of Education.

== Presidents ==
- August Everding (1993–1999)
- Klaus Schultz (acting, 1999)
- Peter Ruzicka (1999–2000)
- Hellmuth Matiasek (2000–2003)
- Christoph Albrecht (2003–2006)
- Klaus Zehelein (2006–2014)
- Hans-Jürgen Drescher (2014–2022)
- Barbara Gronau (2022–today)

== Former students ==
- Benjamin Appl
- Susanne Berckhemer
- Julian David
- Alen Hodzovic
- Birthe Wolter
- Tobias Kratzer
