= Al gran sole carico d'amore =

Opera

- Opera by Luigi Nono
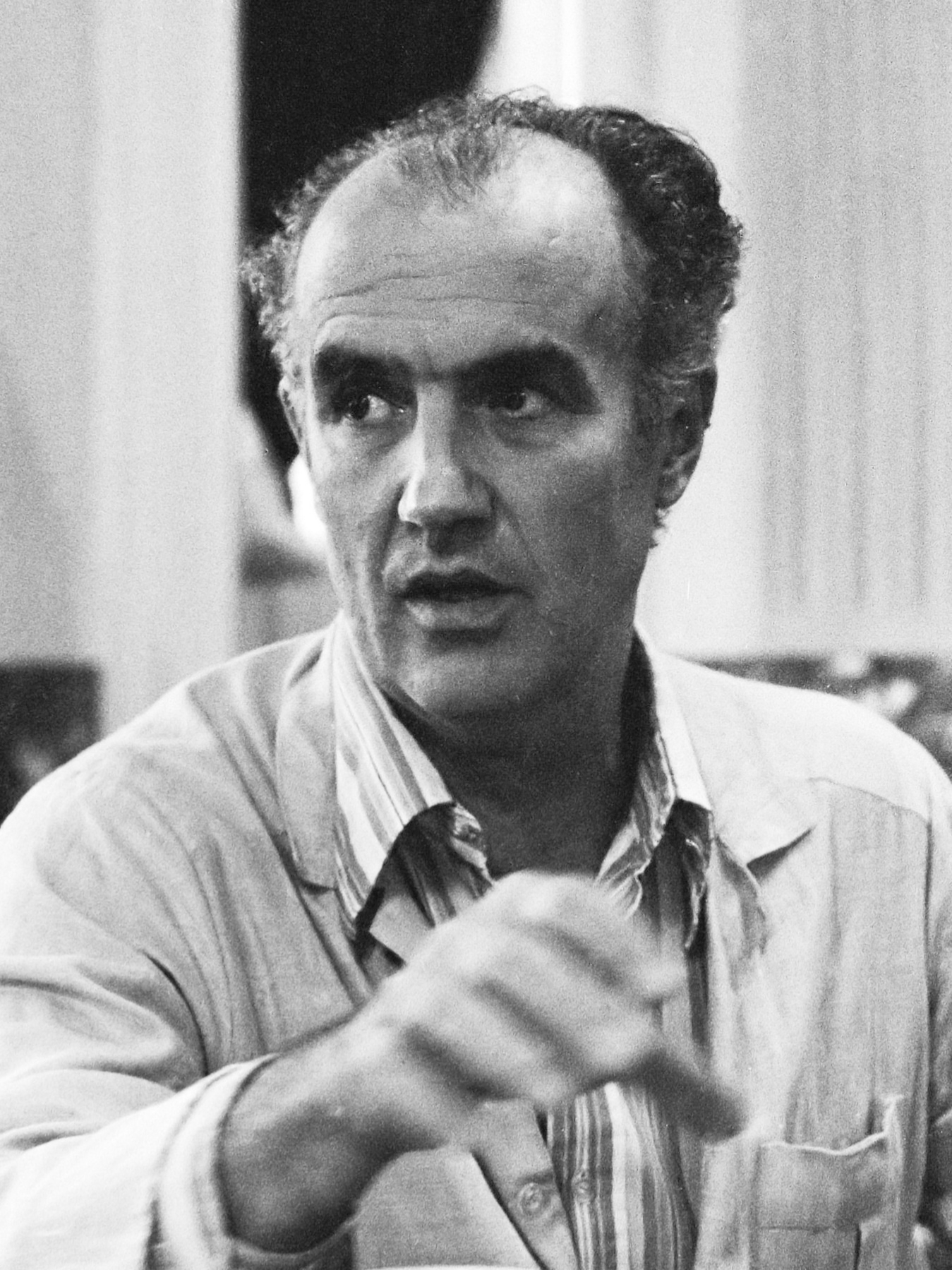
- The composer in 1979
- Librettist: Luigi Nono; Yuri Lyubimov
- Language: Italian, French, German, Spanish
- Based on: Plays by Bertolt Brecht, among others
- Premiere: 4 April 1975; Teatro alla Scala

Al gran sole carico d'amore (In the Bright Sunshine Heavy with Love) is an opera (designated as an 'azione scenica') with music by Luigi Nono, based mainly on plays by Bertolt Brecht, but also incorporating texts of Fidel Castro, Che Guevara, Karl Marx, and Vladimir Lenin. Nono himself and Yuri Lyubimov wrote the libretto. It premiered at the Teatro alla Scala on 4 April 1975, conducted by Claudio Abbado. Lyubimov directed the original production. The UK premiere was at the 32nd Edinburgh Festival in 1978. In addition to vocal soloists, chorus and orchestra, the work incorporates taped sounds. This work is a product of Nono's strong political activism through the mid-1970s.

== Roles ==
- Tania (soprano)
- Thiers (tenor)
- Favre (bass)
- Louise Michel (4 sopranos)
- L'ufficiale, the official (tenor)
- Il soldato, the soldier (tenor)
- Bismarck (bass)
- La madre, the mother (alto)
- Deola (4 sopranos)
- Pavel (baritone)
- Il direttore di una fabbrica russa del 1905, the manager of a Russian factory in 1905 (tenor)
- Il delatore, the police informer (tenor)
- Haydée (soprano)
- Una madre e donne vietnamite, a mother and Vietnamese women (soprano)
- Gramsci (baritone)
- Dimitrov (2 basses)
- Castro (bass)
- Male and female communards, guerillas, comrades, the people of Paris, modern workers, mothers, Sicilian immigrants, Cuban women, prisoners

== Synopsis ==
The story is without conventional linear narrative, and comments in its two parts on the 1871 Paris Commune and the 1905 Russian Revolution. The principal characters are women from those periods, who perish in an attempt to stop the violence of their times.

== Recordings ==
- Teldec New Line (2-CD set) 8573-81059-2: Claudia Barainsky, Maraile Lichdi, Melinda Liebermann, Stella Kleindienst, Lani Poulson, Roderic Keating, Markus Marquardt, Peter Kajlinger, Urs Winter, Helmut Holzapfel, Mark Munkittrick, Carsten Wittmoser; Chorus and Orchestra of the Staatsoper Stuttgart; Lothar Zagrosek, conductor. Recorded June–July 1999 in the Staatstheater Stuttgart.
