= Claudia Barainsky =

German operatic soprano

- Born: 30 September 1965 (age 59); Berlin
- Education: Hochschule der Künste
- Occupation: Operatic soprano
- Awards: Preis der deutschen Schallplattenkritik; Der Faust
- Website: www.claudiabarainsky.de

Claudia Barainsky (born 30 September 1965) is a German operatic soprano. She has performed internationally, and won awards for her roles in contemporary operas such as Bernd Alois Zimmermann's Die Soldaten and Aribert Reimann's Medea.

== Career ==
Born in Berlin, Barainsky studied at the Hochschule der Künste with Ingrid Figur. She took classes with Dietrich Fischer-Dieskau and Aribert Reimann. At the beginning of her career, she appeared in concerts at festivals such as Sommerliche Musiktage Hitzacker, Internationale Maifestspiele Wiesbaden, the Schubertiade in Feldkirch, and the Wittener Tage für neue Kammermusik. She made her stage debut in 1993 at the Stadttheater Bern as Konstanze in Mozart's Die Entführung aus dem Serail. A year later, she sang there the title role of Alban Berg's Lulu. She appeared in the title role of Aribert Reimann's Melusine at the Semperoper in Dresden.

She performed at the Deutsche Oper am Rhein in 1995 the parts of Sophie in Der Rosenkavalier by Richard Strauss, Musetta in Puccini's La Bohème and Blonde in Die Entführung. She appeared at the Bayreuth Festival first in 1998 as a flower maiden in Parsifal, and again in 2000 as the Forest Bird (Waldvogel) in Siegfried.

Barainsky participated in the 2000 premiere of Aribert Reimann's Bernarda Albas Haus at the Bayerische Staatsoper as Martirio, and performed the same part at the Komische Oper Berlin. In 2001, she appeared as Anna in Heinrich Marschner's Hans Heiling at the Deutsche Oper Berlin. She was awarded the Preis der deutschen Schallplattenkritik in the category "best singer" in 2007 for her interpretation of Marie in Bernd Alois Zimmermann's Die Soldaten.

She performed at Handel Festival Karlsruhe, and at the opera houses in Amsterdam, Avignon, Brussels and Tokyo, among others. In 2009, she appeared at the Semperoper as Badi'at in Henze's L'Upupa.

She appeared in the title role of Reimann's Medea at the Frankfurt Opera in the German premiere in September 2010, and was awarded the 2011 German theater prize Der Faust for her performance. She repeated the role in 2017 at the Vienna State Opera, conducted by Michael Boder.

In 2014, she performed the title role of Daphne by Strauss at the Théâtre du Capitole in Toulouse. She performed at the 2017 premiere of Uri Caine's song cycle on texts from Des Knaben Wunderhorn, conducted by Kristjan Järvi. Composers have written works for her; for example, Aribert Reimann's Tarde for soprano and orchestra in 2003, after a poem by Juan Ramón Jiménez.

She collaborated with conductors such as Gerd Albrecht, Herbert Blomstedt, Sylvain Cambreling, Christoph Eschenbach, Michael Gielen, Hartmut Haenchen, Daniel Harding, Zubin Mehta, Ingo Metzmacher, Christian Thielemann and Lothar Zagrosek.

== Recordings ==
She was the soprano soloist in a 2008 recording of Bern Alois Zimmermann's Requiem für einen jungen Dichter by Cybele Records, with the Czech Philharmonic Choir Brno, the Slovak Philharmonic Choir, EuropaChorAkademie, Eric Vloeimans Quintet and the Holland Symfonia, conducted by Bernhard Kontarsky.
