= Diego de Brea =

Slovenian theatre director

Diego de Brea (born 1969 in Šempeter pri Gorici) is a Slovenian theatre director.

== Life and work ==
Diego de Brea grew up in Nova Gorica and studied comparative literature and art history at the Faculty of Arts in Ljubljana. In 1995 he began studying theatre direction at the Academy for Theatre, Radio, Film and Television in Ljubljana.

In 1999 his graduation piece, The Birth of Light, won an award at the International Student Production Theatre Festival in Brno.

His work has been performed in Belgrade, at the Varna Festival in Bulgaria, at the Mladi levi and Exodos Festivals, in London, Paris, Antwerp, Mons, Dortmund and at the Iberoamericano Festival in Bogotá, Colombia.

== Major works ==
- Pilot – hommage to Srečko Kosovel, AGRFT, 1996/7
- Federico – poetry by Federico García Lorca, MGL, 1999
- Oton Župančič: Veronika of Desenice, Šentjakobsko Theatre, 2000
- Eugène Ionesco: Exit the King, PDG Drama Theatre Nova Gorica, 2000
- Bob Fosse: Chicago, SGL Celje, 2002
- Duel, GLEJ Theatre, 2002
- Roland Schimmelpfenning: Arabian Night, SNG Nova Gorica, 2005
- Alfred de Vigny: Chatterton, Slovene National Theatre (SNG) Drama Ljubljana, 2004
- Ivan Cankar: A Scandal in Saint Florian's Valley, SNG Nova Gorica, 2005
- Alexandre Dumas: Queen Margot, Mladinsko theatre, Ljubljana, 2005
- Christopher Marlowe: Edward II, SNG Drama Ljubljana, 2005
- Christopher Marlowe: Doctor Faustus, SNG Nova Gorica, 2006
- Luchino Visconti: The Damned, Mladinsko Theatre, Ljubljana, 2006
- Jean Genet: The Maids, SNG Drama Ljubljana, 2007
