= Christine Schäfer =

German operatic soprano

- Born: 3 March 1965 (age 61); Frankfurt, Hesse, West Germany
- Education: Hochschule der Künste Berlin
- Occupations: Soprano singer; academic
- Years active: 1992–present

Christine Schäfer (born 3 March 1965) is a German operatic soprano.

== Biography ==
Schäfer was born in Frankfurt. She studied from 1984 until 1991 at the Hochschule der Künste Berlin, where her teachers were Ingrid Figur, Aribert Reimann and Dietrich Fischer-Dieskau. She also took master classes with Arleen Augér and Sena Jurinac.

After finishing her studies in 1992, Schäfer began singing at the opera house in Innsbruck. The next year she made her debut in the United States, singing Sophie in Der Rosenkavalier in San Francisco. In 1995, she performed to great acclaim during the Salzburg Festival as the title role in Berg's Lulu, a part she would later sing at the Metropolitan Opera and at Glyndebourne. Other notable opera roles were Alcina at the Drottningholm Palace Theatre, Donna Anna in a production of Don Giovanni in the Palais Garnier, directed by Michael Haneke and Gilda in a 2000 BBC production of Rigoletto at Covent Garden.

In June 2007, she interpreted Violetta in Christoph Marthaler's new production of La traviata alongside Jonas Kaufmann as Alfredo at the Palais Garnier. She was also featured in the same role when the production reprised in autumn. She then starred in the Met premiere of Richard Jones's production of Hansel and Gretel in the role of Gretel, against Alice Coote's Hansel. In 2008, she presented Schubert's Winterreise at the Rose Theater, accompanied by Eric Scheider, her regular pianist.

In late summer 2014, she announced taking a sabbatical in the 2014/15 season for private reasons. In May 2015, it was announced that the sabbatical would be extended indefinitely. Since 2011/12 she has been a guest professor at the Hochschule für Musik Hanns Eisler Berlin. From 2015/16 winter semester, she became professor of singing at the school.

== Repertoire ==
Her repertoire contains several baroque operas, Bach cantatas, and many of the great Mozart roles, such as Konstanze (Die Entführung aus dem Serail), Cherubino (The Marriage of Figaro), Pamina (The Magic Flute) and Servilia (La clemenza di Tito). But Schäfer also sings modern pieces like Pierrot Lunaire and Pli selon pli, both of which she recorded with Pierre Boulez conducting. Other recordings include Lieder by Robert Schumann, which won Gramophone Magazine's solo vocal award in 1997; lieder of Franz Schubert including his Winterreise; and songs by Ernest Chausson and Claude Debussy. She also recorded a recital program of arias by Mozart and songs by Richard Strauss (1998, Claudio Abbado conducting); and a disc of arias from Alcina by Handel (2009, Rainer Kussmaul conducting).

== Personal life ==
Schäfer has two children from her relationship with the film director Oliver Herrmann, who died in 2003. Schäfer and Herrmann collaborated on a film project of Robert Schumann's Dichterliebe and Arnold Schoenberg's Pierrot Lunaire.
