= Ivica Buljan =

Croatian theatre director

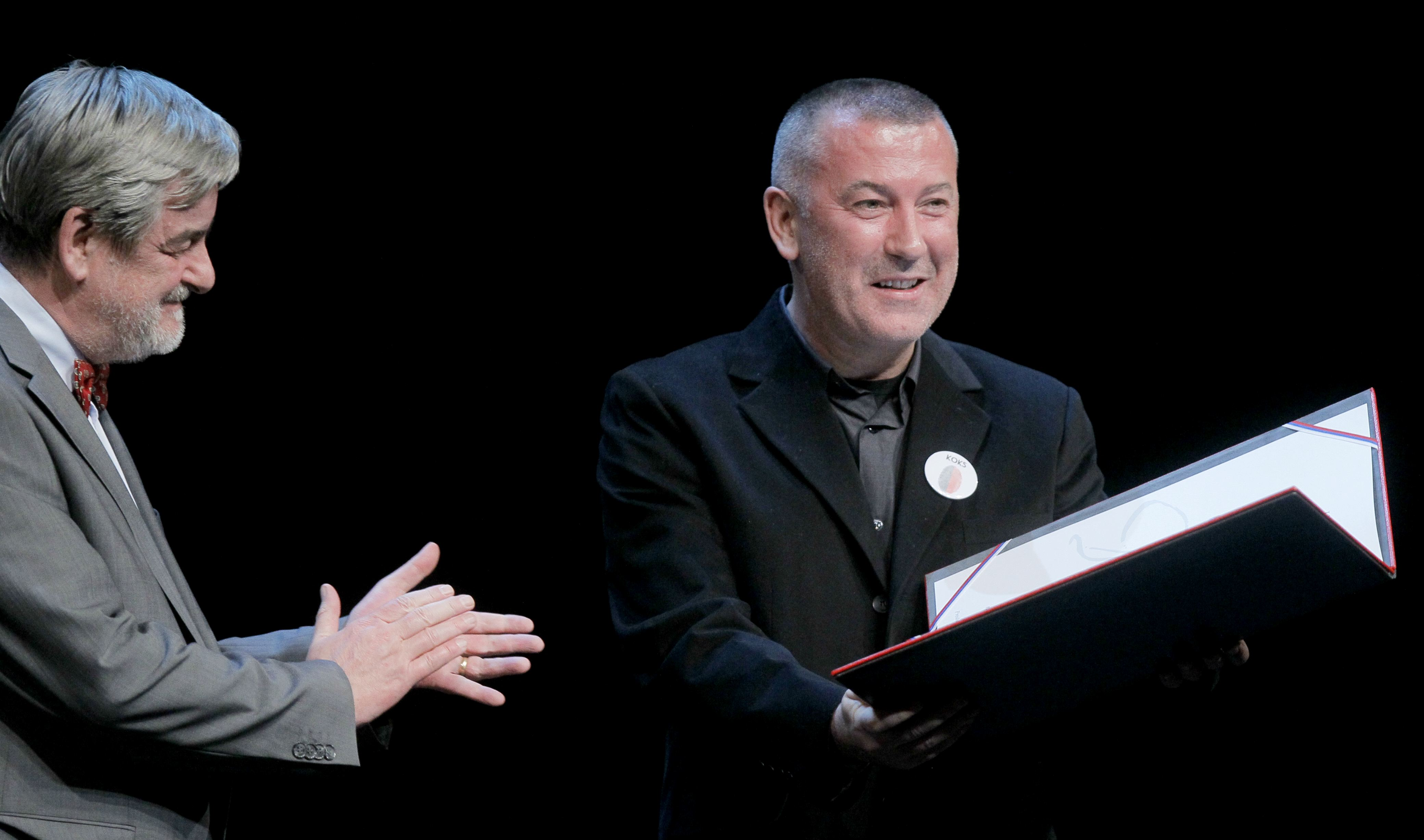
- Born: 29 March 1965 (age 60); Sinj, SR Croatia, SFR Yugoslavia
- Occupation: Theater director
- Years active: 1990s-present

Ivica Buljan (born 29 March 1965) is a Croatian theater director, playwright, theater critic, and educator whose work is widely known in Croatia and performed around the globe.

== Career ==
Buljan studied political science, French, and comparative literature at the University of Zagreb. During his studies, worked as a writer for magazines including Polet and Start. He has served as a regular theater critic for Slobodna Dalmacija, a daily newspaper published in Split, Croatia. He is also a member of the editorial boards of the theater show Novi Prolog and the theoretical theater journal Frakcija (English: Fraction). Buljan is also associated with the international theater magazines Primer Acto (Madrid), Ubu (Paris, London), Mask (Ljubljana).

Buljan's work as a theater director includes both directing works and running multiple groups and festivals. Buljan's work has been performed at international festivals in more than 30 different countries. Drawing on Antonin Artaud, his theater focuses on the actor's presence.

Buljan served as the director of the Croatian National Theatre in Split from 1998 to 2002. In 1999, during his tenure, the Croatian National Theatre joined the European Theater Convention. Buljan is also the co-founder and artistic director of the Mini theater in Ljubljana as well as the founder and director of the New Theatre in Zagreb.

Together with Dubravko Vrgoč, Buljan founded the World Theatre Festival in Zagreb in 2003, and both serve as co-curators and artistic directors.

As an educator, Buljan has taught in Paris, Brussels, and Moscow, and as a guest lecturer at La MaMa in New York. He is a professor at the National Theatre Academy in Saint-Étienne, France.

As a playwright, he worked in Croatia, France, Slovenia and collaborated on more than twenty international projects with directors such as Vito Taufer, Matjaž Pograjc, Christian Colin, Pierre Diependaele, Jean-Michel Bruyere, Krizstof Warlikowski, Eduard Miler, Ivan Popovski and Robert Waltl.

He is a member of International Association of ETC in Brussels, the Institute of Mediterranean Theatre in Madrid, and the International Theatre Institute (ITI-UNESCO) in Paris.

== Awards ==
- Borštnik Award (best play in Slovenia, multiple-time winner)
- Sterija Award
- Vjesnik Award
- Dubravko Dujšin Award, 1997, for Phaedra
- Branko Gavella Award
- Petar Brečić Award
- City of Havana Award, 2005, for Medea Material
- Prešern Foundation Award
- Member of Republic of France's Order of Arts and Letters

== Selected publications ==
- Antologija novije francuske drame. Zagreb : Hrvatski centar ITI-UNESCO, 2006.
- Buljan, Ivica, Petra Pogorevc, Polona Petek. "The actorʹs inteptness and my own are the inevitable : an interview with Ivica Buljan." Maska 19: 91-93.
- "Iconoclasm: A View on Theatre." Frakcija 15 (1999): 8–13.
- "Koltes[!] & Succo : love at first sight" Slovensko mladinsko gledališče. Ljubljana, (1995): 4-8.
- "Carmen: ah, Carmen ali nekritcni hedonizem Tomaza Pandurja." Maska 2: 8-9.
