= Sylvain Cambreling =

French conductor

Sylvain Cambreling (born 2 July 1948 in Amiens, France) is a French conductor.

== Biography ==
Trained as a trombone player, Cambreling studied at the Paris Conservatoire. He joined l'Orchestre Symphonique de Lyon (OSL) as a trombonist in 1971. In 1974, he took second prize in the International Besançon Competition for Young Conductors. His conducting debut was with the OSL in 1975, leading Robert Schumann's Scenes from Goethe's Faust. At the invitation of Pierre Boulez, he began to guest-conduct the Ensemble Intercontemporain regularly from 1976.

Cambreling was the music director of the Théâtre de la Monnaie, Brussels from 1981 to 1991, during Gerard Mortier's tenure. He served as artistic director and general music director of the Frankfurt Opera from 1993 to 1997. During his Frankfurt tenure, he encountered controversy over proposed budget cuts from the city of Frankfurt and the director for opera and ballet, Martin Steinhoff. From 1997 to 2004, he served as principal guest conductor of Klangforum Wien, with whom he premiered Luciano Berio's final opera, Cronaca del luogo. He also made several commercial recordings with Klangforum Wien. He was a frequent conductor at the Opéra National de Paris during Mortier's tenure there, from 2004 to 2009, holding the title of "principal conductor" for the first season of that duration, a title shared with six other conductors.

From 1999 to 2011, Cambreling was chief conductor of the SWR Sinfonieorchester Baden-Baden und Freiburg, and made several commercial recordings with the orchestra. In April 2010, he was named Generalmusikdirektor (GMD) of the Stuttgart State Opera, effective with the 2012–2013 season. He concluded his Stuttgart tenure at the close of the 2017–2018 season. Cambreling had been offered the post of chief conductor of the newly-formed SWR Symphonieorchester, but declined on principle, in protest at the merger of the two precursor orchestras into the new ensemble. In February 2018, the Symphoniker Hamburg announced the appointment of Cambreling as its next chief conductor, effective with the 2018–2019 season. In June 2022, the Symphoniker Hamburg announced the extension of Cambreling's contract through the summer of 2028.

Outside of Europe, Cambreling became principal conductor of the Yomiuri Nippon Symphony Orchestra in April 2010, with an initial contract of 3 years. He concluded his tenure as principal conductor on 31 March 2019, and now has the title of conductor laureate of the orchestra.

Cultural offices
Preceded by John Pritchard	General Music Director, Théâtre de la Monnaie, Brussels; 1981–1991	Succeeded by Antonio Pappano
Preceded by Gary Bertini	General Music Director, Frankfurt Opera; 1993–1997	Succeeded by Paolo Carignani
Preceded by Michael Gielen	Chief Conductor, Southwest German Radio Symphony Orchestra; 1999–2011	Succeeded by François-Xavier Roth
Preceded by Stanislaw Skrowaczewski	Principal Conductor, Yomiuri Nippon Symphony Orchestra; 2010–2019	Succeeded by Sebastian Weigle
Preceded by Manfred Honeck	General Music Director, Staatsoper Stuttgart; 2012–2018	Succeeded by Cornelius Meister
Preceded by Jeffrey Tate	Chief Conductor, Symphoniker Hamburg; 2018–present	Succeeded by incumbent
