= Matjaž Pograjc =

Matjaž Pograjc (born 1967 in Ljubljana) is a Slovenian theatre director and one of Slovenia's most prominent theatre artists.

== Life and work ==
Studies in theatre and radio direction (AGRFT, Ljubljana). In 1990, he founded the Betontanc group, with which he develops and researches choreographical and physical forms of stage expression, employing ideologically oriented themes – especially from the world of urban adolescence. Another important part of his research is dedicated to verbal theatrical structure; with the aid of the Mladinsko Theatre ensemble, Pograjc explores a directional concept based on original interpretations of contemporary dramatic texts or the contributions of the acting team. His method of interpretation involves different genres of pop culture, under which he discovers modern archetypal models of a lost civilization, chaos, violence and cruelty.

== Major works ==
- Mladinsko Theatre:
- Bernard-Marie Koltès: Roberto Zucco, 1996
- Butterendfly (based on M. Butterfly by David Henry Hwang, 1995).
- A Place I've Never Been, 1996.
- D. Z. Frey: Tirza, 1997.
- Who's Afraid of Tennessee Williams?, 1999.
- The House of Bernarda Alba (based on Federico García Lorca, 2000.
- J. M. Barrie – M. Pograjc: Peter Pan, 2001.
- Peter Weiss: The Persecution and Assassination of Jean-Paul Marat, 2002.
- Play it Again, Caligula (based on Albert Camus: Caligula), 2003.
- Daša Doberšek, Branko Jordan, Nataša Matjašec: Luluby, 2004.
- Tena Štivičić: Fragile!, 2005.
- Fabio Rubiano O.: The Whale’s Belly, 2006.
- Love to Death (A concert for a chef, six apprentices and three dishwashers), 2007.
- Betontanc:
- Poets without Pockets, Ljubljana, 1990.
- Romeo and Juliet, Ljubljana, 1991.
- Every Word a Gold Coin Worth, Ljubljana, 1992.
- Wet Hanky Thieves, Ljubljana, Angers, 1993.
- Know Your Enemy!, Ljubljana, 1995.
- On Three Sides of Heaven, Ljubljana, 1997.
- The Secret Sunshine Schedule, Bunker Productions, Ljubljana, 1999.
- Midnight Meat Flight, 2000.
- Maison des rendez-vous, Ljubljana, Rennes, 2002.
- Wrestling Dostoievsky, Vienna, 2004.
- Everybody for Berlusconi, Junghollandia and Betontanc, 2004.
- Show Your Face!, Betontanc and Umka.LV, 2006.

== Honours, awards and recognitions ==
- Grand prix Bagnolet '92, Paris, 1992
- Borštnik Award for special achievements, Maribor, Slovenia, 1992
- Prešeren Fund Award for directions in Mladinsko Theatre and Betontanc, Ljubljana, Slovenia, 1997
- Best breakthrough choreographer-director in the »Top Five in New York 2000« section of the New York Times (after the tour in La MaMa with The Secret Sunshine Schedule), New York, USA, 2000
- The Villanueva Award to the performance Who's Afraid of Tennessee Williams? as one of the best foreign productions in Cuba, 2003
- Marul Award for best direction for Fragile!, Days of Marulić Festival, Split, Croatia, 2006
- Grand Prix of the Borštnik Drama Meeting for Fragile!, Maribor, Slovenia, 2006
