= André Kaczmarczyk =

German actor

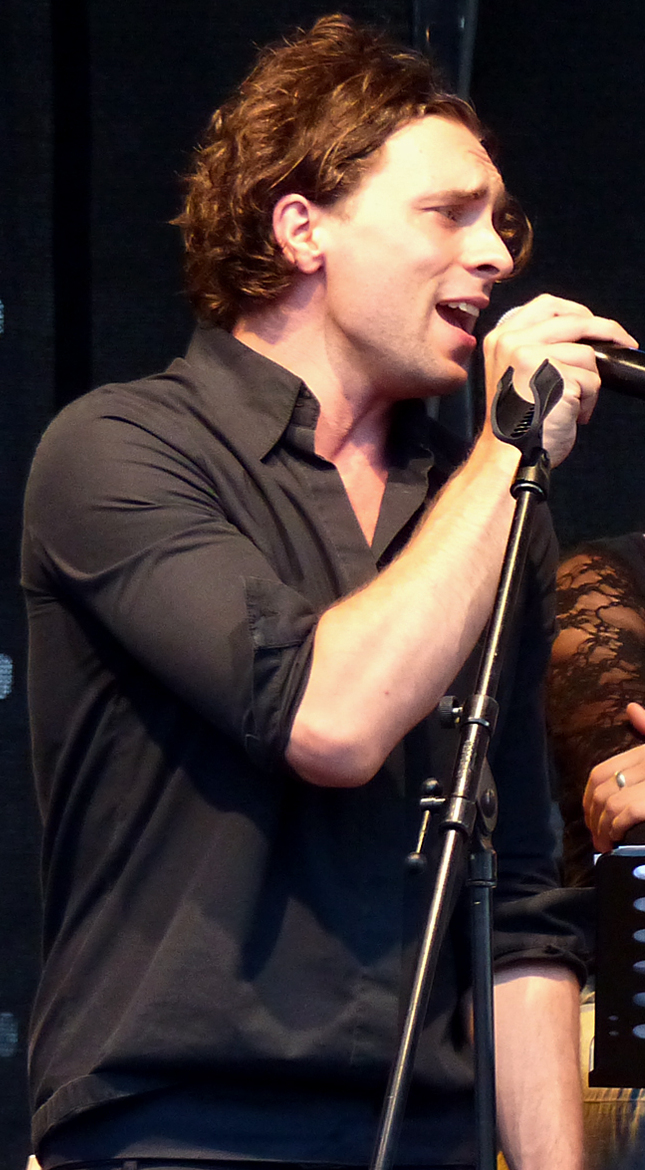
- André Kaczmarczyk (2016).
- Born: March 11, 1986 (age 40); Suhl, Germany
- Occupation: Actor
- Years active: 2005-present

André Kaczmarczyk (born 11 March 1986) is a German actor and director.

== Life ==
=== Early life and theatre ===
Kaczmarczyk is from Eisenach. He attended the musical and artistic branch at the local Elisabeth-Gymnasium, where he also did his Abitur. He started acting in theatre as a teenager and was active in various youth theater projects. He was initially a member of the youth club at the "Freien Eisenacher Burgtheater" and, after it closed, in the Landestheater Eisenach. In the summer of 2005, after graduating from high school, he played the young Martin Luther in the historical medieval spectacle Luther - the Eisenach open-air stage festival. He also appeared again later at the Luther Festival, in 2007 as Luther's famulus Georg Rörer and in 2009 as the devil.

He began his professional theatre career in 2004 at the Landestheater Eisenach, even before he actually trained as an actor, and in 2005 he moved to the Hans Otto Theater in Potsdam, where he was a member of the ensemble until 2007. He also completed his voluntary social year at the Hans Otto Theater. There in 2006 he took on the role of the young soldier in the premiere of David Salz, a scenic collage based on an idea by Lea Rosh about the Auschwitz survivor David Salz, directed by Uwe Eric Laufenberg. In September 2006, he also played the role of André, the new partner of the female protagonist, in the German premiere of the play Safety Distance by Franco-Canadian Frédéric Blanchette at the Hans Otto Theater.

André then studied acting at the Ernst Busch Academy of Dramatic Arts in Berlin from 2006 to 2009. Between 2007 and 2010 he appeared regularly at the bat-Studiotheater at the Ernst Busch Academy during his studies, including as a writer in Die Jagdgesellschaft and as Lenz in a stage version of the story Lenz by Georg Büchner. From 2007 he was already working as a freelance actor alongside his training. In 2008 he played Rosencrantz in Hamlet at the Maxim Gorki Theater in Berlin directed by Tilmann Köhler. In 2010 he had an engagement at the Volkstheater Rostock and he also acted in Orfeo – Love will tear us apart, a production of the Kunstfestspiele Herrenhausen in Hanover, and in a stage version of the novel Berlin Alexanderplatz at the Berlin Schaubühne, directed by Volker Loesch.

He has worked at the Staatsschauspiel Dresden since 2011, from the 2013/14 season he was also a permanent member of the ensemble there until 2016. There he appeared as Jessica in an all-male cast of Shakespeare's tragic comedy The Merchant of Venice, as Spelunken-Jenny in Brecht/Weill's The Threepenny Opera, as Goylbastard Nerron in the world premiere of the children's and family theater play Reckless II - Vivid Shadows by Cornelia Funke and as Kevin "Princess" Marley in the world premiere of the play Fast ganz nah (euer Krieg ist unser Krieg) by Pamela Carter. In Dresden, he also played "Hallodri" Alfred in Horváth's play Tales from the Vienna Woods, Nikolai in Dostoyevsky's Demons and the fool Touchstone in Shakespeare's As You Like It.

In the 2014/15 season André took on the title character in Danton's Death in a new production by director Friederike Heller at the Dresden Staatsschauspiel. In the 2015/16 season he played the role of the impoverished Prince Myschkin in a stage version of Dostoevsky's novel The Idiot in a production by the former Burgtheater director Matthias Hartmann. In the 2015/16 season, Kaczmarczyk was back on stage in a travesty role as he played the opera diva Ildebranda Cuffari in a stage adaptation of Fellini's And the Ship Sails On. He was also in Dresden for several seasons, alongside Lea Ruckpaul as Isa, as "Tschick" in the stage adaptation of the novel of the same name by Wolfgang Herrndorf. He also played this role in 2015–2016, his last season as a permanent member, at the Staatsschauspiel Dresden.

Since the 2016/17 season he has been a permanent member of the ensemble at the Düsseldorfer Schauspielhaus under the new artistic director Wilfried Schulz. There he played the role of Enkidu in the epic play of Gilgamesh, a stage adaptation by Raoul Schrott in 2016–2017.

Kaczmarczyk also wrote his own pieces, often musical. In the 2016/17 season he staged the ensemble recital Heart of Gold. In 2017/2018 he premiered the production Jeff Koons, a scenic installation based on the play of the same name by Rainald Goetz, which he created together with Felix Krakow. His stage version of Alice based on Lewis Carroll had its premiere as a musical in October 2020 at the Düsseldorf Schauspielhaus.

In September 2024 he was nominated was nominated for a Faust award for his role in the Faust in Düsseldorf. In December he was involved in the project "Tatort Mittelmeer", a scenic reading of eyewitness reports and stories of those rescued as well as the documentation of violations of law on the Mediterranean, witnessed and recorded by the rescue crew of SOS Humanity.

Kaczmarczyk lives in Düsseldorf-Flingern.

=== Film, television and radio ===
Kaczmarczyk also took part in film and television productions and in several short films. In the episode Ludwig II and the Bavarians (Season 2; Part 8), first broadcast on 4 December 2010 as part of the ZDF television documentary series Die Deutschen, he embodied the fairytale king Ludwig II of Bavaria. In 2011 he had a small role (as Titania) in the historical thriller Anonymus by Roland Emmerich. He played the poet Nathanael in the 2010 short film The Sandman, which was based on the story of the same name by E. T. A. Hoffmann and had its TV premiere in April 2012.

In 2012 he had an episode role in the ARD crime series Heiter bis tödlich: Akte Ex as a young artist Tobias Krüger. In the same year, Kaczmarczyk was also seen in two fairy tale films: as the young King Jakob in Allerleirauh (Das Erste, December 2012) and as Prince Markus in The Six Swans (ZDF, December 2012), he gave both roles "complex character traits".

In November 2015, Kaczmarczyk appeared in the ARD serie In aller Freundschaft – Die jungen Ärzte as Heiko "Ralle" Rallburg. He played the criminal best friend of assistant doctor Elias Bähr (Stefan Ruppe) from their school days together. In the ZDF television thriller München Mord: Wo bist Du, Feigling?, first broadcast in September 2016 he was seen in the role of Niklas Bernhard. In the 9th season of the crime serie Die Chefin first broadcast from August 2018 he had a leading role as Anton Berger, he embodied the owner of a Munich software and IT company and brother of a psychopathic multiple murderer alongside Franz Pätzold.

Since January 2022, Vincent Ross, has been the first gender-fluid Polizeiruf 110 commissioner and successor to Maria Simon (Olga Lenski). Together with Lucas Gregorowicz (Adam Raczek), he formed a Polish-German investigative duo until 2022. Then pairing with Karl Rogov (Frank Leo Schröder).

André Kaczmarczyk has also worked as a radio play speaker in various radio play productions by Rundfunk Berlin-Brandenburg, Deutschlandfunk Kultur and BBC Radio.
