= Residence Theatre =

Drama theatre in Munich, Germany

Coordinates: 48°08′24″N 11°34′44″E

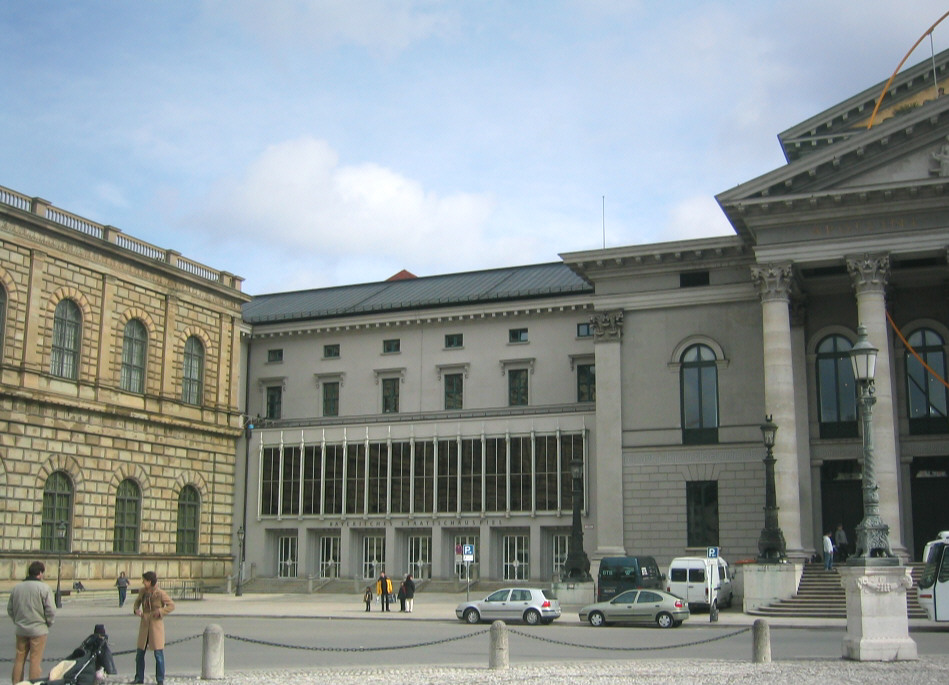
Residenztheater

The Residence Theatre (in German: Residenztheater) or New Residence Theatre (Neues Residenztheater) of the Residence in Munich was built from 1950 to 1951 by Karl Hocheder. A renovation of 1981 by Alexander von Branca removed the decoration which had been done in the typical style of the early 1950s.

== History ==
Elector of Bavaria Maximilian III Joseph ordered in 1751 to construct a new theatre outside the palace after a fire in the St. George's Hall of the Residence which had served as before as a theatre room. This theatre was also destroyed during World War II and replaced by the New Residence Theatre. Since the decoration of the Old Residence Theatre had been rescued, it was moved into a wing of the Residence and re-opened as Cuvilliés Theatre (Old Residence Theatre).

The New Residence Theatre houses the Bavarian State Theatre (Bavarian Staatsschauspiel), one of the most important German language theatres in the world.

== Directors of the Staatsschauspiel ==
- 1938 to 1945 Alexander Golling
- 1945 to 1948 Paul Verhoeven
- 1948 to 1953 Alois Johannes Lippl
- 1953 to 1958 Kurt Horwitz
- 1958 to 1972 Helmut Henrichs
- 1972 to 1983 Kurt Meisel
- 1983 to 1986 Frank Baumbauer
- 1986 to 1993 Günther Beelitz
- 1993 to 2001 Eberhard Witt
- 2001 to 2011 Dieter Dorn
- since 2011 Martin Kušej
