= Landestheater Schwaben =

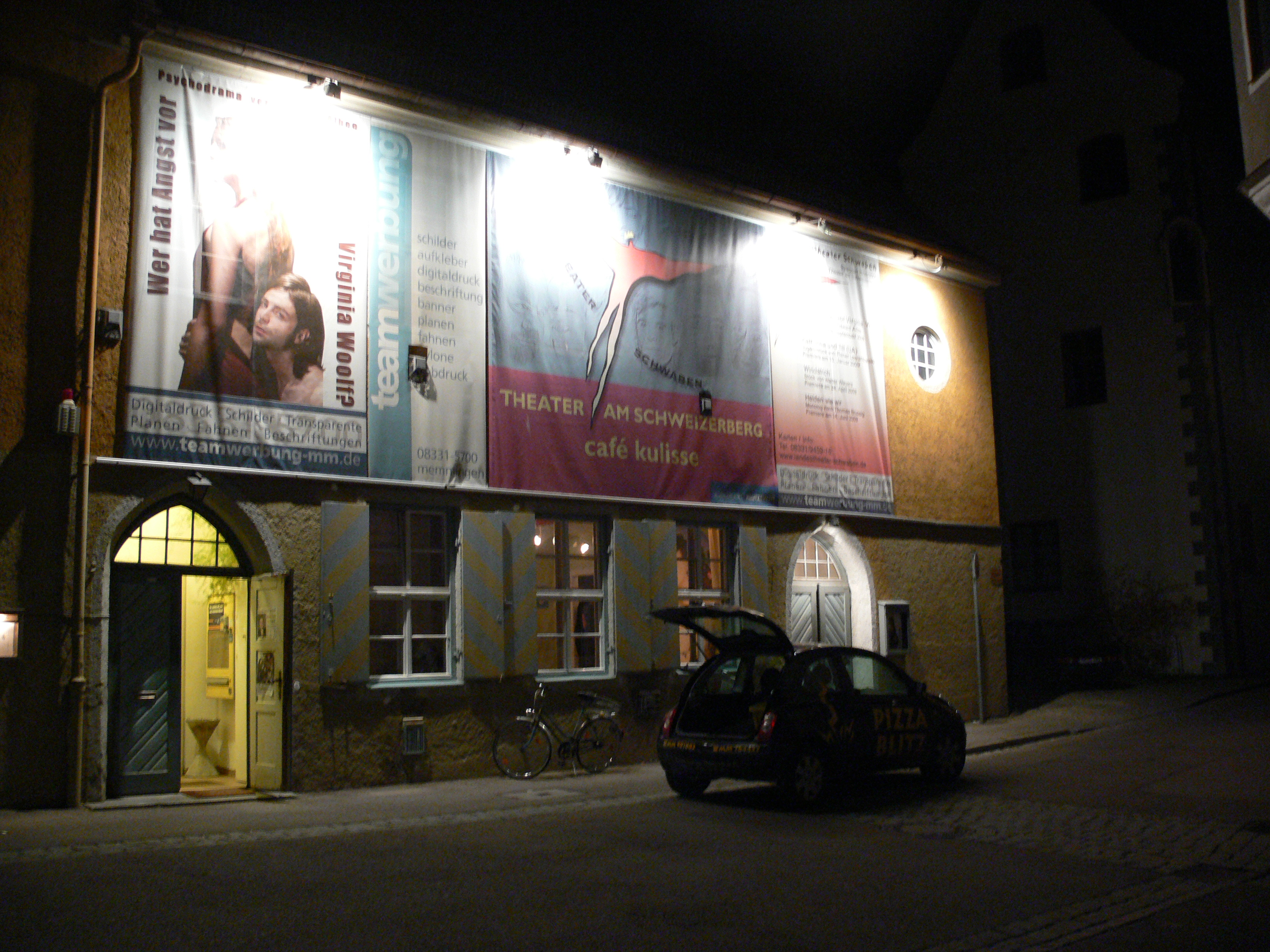
Landestheater Schwaben building

The Landestheater Schwaben is an ensemble based in Memmingen in Upper Swabia. The ensemble's main venue is the Stadttheater Memmingen. The artistic director of the ensemble has been Kathrin Mädler since 2016. As a state theater, the Landestheater Schwaben is supported by a special- purpose association consisting of 21 cities, municipalities and districts. Thus, the ensemble not only plays at the headquarters in Memmingen, but also fulfills its cultural mission beyond that. With its guest performances, the Landestheater Schwaben is not only in Bavaria, but also, for example, in Baden-Württemberg, Hesse, but also in Austria and Switzerland.
