= Akademietheater (Munich) =

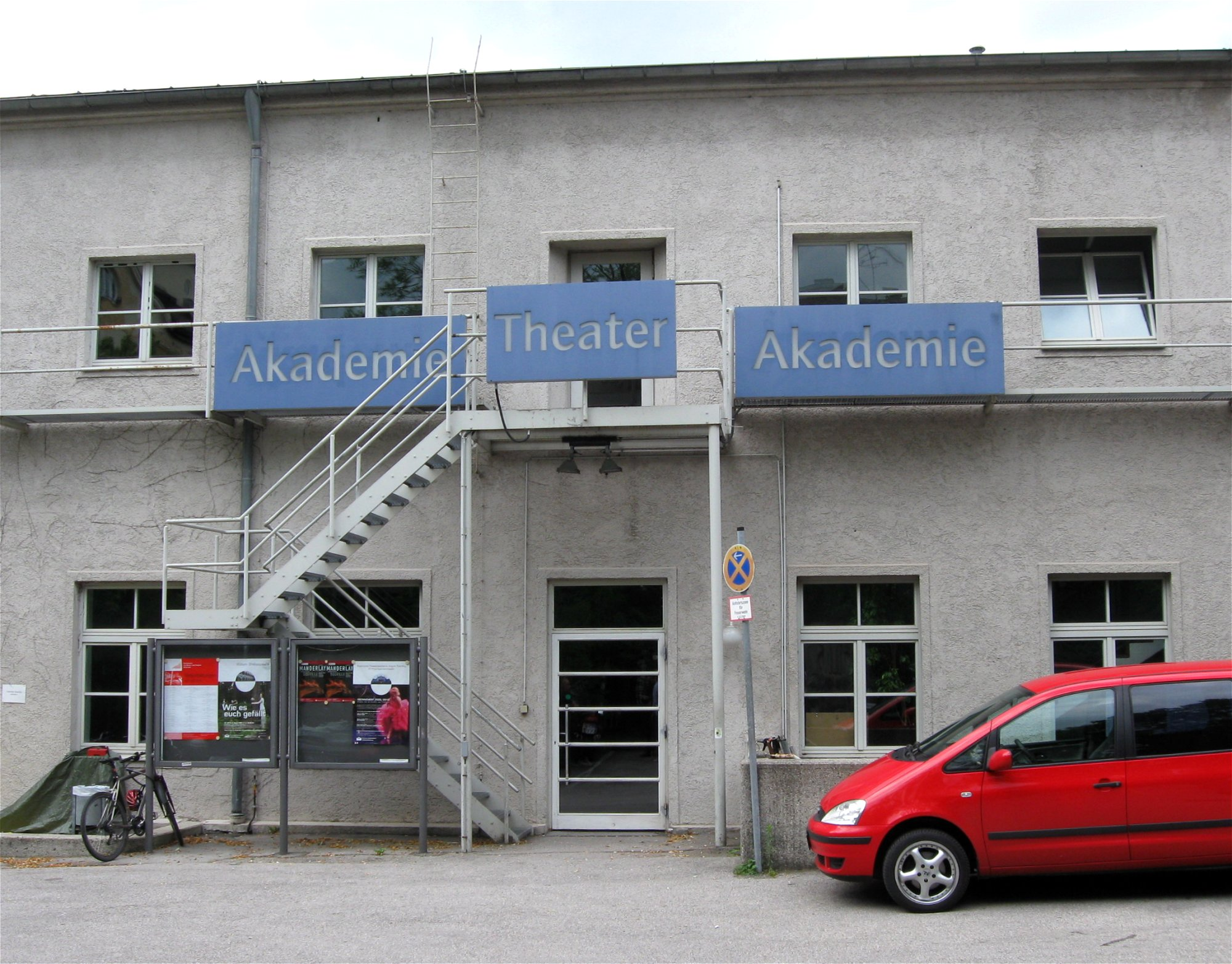
- Akademietheater (Munich)
- Interactive map of Akademietheater
- Address: Prinzregentenplatz 12; 81675 Munich; Germany
- Coordinates: 48°08′19″N 11°36′20″E
- Capacity: 250 seats

Construction
- Opened: 11 November 1996

Website
- www.theaterakademie.de/en/spielstaetten/akademietheater

The Akademietheater in the Bogenhausen district of Munich, Germany, is a venue for the August Everding Bavarian Theatre Academy for directing, acting and musical productions. It was opened on November 11, 1996, and is located on the first floor in the rear section of the Prinzregententheater and can be entered via the garden or from Zumpestraße. The Akademietheater consists of a three-aisled room, which can be divided into three theatre rooms (East/Central/West) that are simultaneously playable. As an independent workshop theatre, it has a separate entrance, its own cloakrooms and its own foyer. Furthermore, it can accommodate up to 250 spectators depending on the (variable) seating. An elevator and a disabled toilet are available for visitors with reduced mobility, and two wheelchair spaces are allowed.
