= Tomi Janežič =

Slovenian theatre director and professor

Tomi Janežič is a Slovenian theatre director, a professor at the Academy of Theatre, Radio, Film and Television (AGRFT) in Ljubljana, and a psychodrama psychotherapist. He is the founder and artistic director of the Studio for Research on the Art of Acting, which carries out most of its activities at the Krušče Workcenter for Artistic Research, Creation, Residency, and Education in Krušče, Slovenia.

== Education ==
Janežič obtained his Bachelor of Arts and Master of Arts degrees in theatre directing from the AGRFT in Ljubljana. He continued his education in Slovenia and abroad, focusing on acting techniques and psychodrama. He completed introductory studies in group analysis at the Institute for Group Analysis in Ljubljana.

He obtained a psychodrama psychotherapist certificate after completing the International Psychodrama Education program at the Belgrade Institute of Psychodrama and the Zagreb Center for Psychodrama.

== Career ==
In addition to working extensively in the former Yugoslavia, Janežič has directed productions and lectured in Bulgaria, Slovakia, Romania, Italy, Norway, Portugal, and Russia.

His performances have been featured at dozens of international festivals around Europe, in Russia, and in the United States, as well as many important regional theatre festivals in the countries of the former Yugoslavia. These festivals include:

- Wiener Festwochen (Vienna, Austria)
- Kunstenfestivaldesarts (Brussels, Belgium)
- BITEF – Belgrade International Theatre Festival (Serbia)
- Fabbrica Europa (Florence, Italy)
- Budapest Spring Festival (Hungary)
- Nitra International Theatre Festival (Slovakia)
- Sarajevo International Theatre Festival MESS and International Sarajevo Winter Festival (Bosnia and Herzegovina)
- Eurokaz International Theatre Festival Zagreb
- Rijeka International Small Scenes Theatre Festival
- Dubrovnik Summer Festival (Croatia)
- Paradise Regained (Rotterdam and other cities, the Netherlands)
- Tanzwerkstatt Europea München and Tanzhaus NRW Düsseldorf (Germany)
- Balkan Theatre Space International Theatre Festival St. Petersburg and Moscow Footlights – International Festival of Contemporary Dance (Russia)
- MOT Skopje International Theatre Festival and International Ohrid Festival (Macedonia)
- Exodos International Theatre Festival Ljubljana (Slovenia)
- Piatra Neamt, Timișoara and Sfântu Gheorghe International Theatre Festivals (Romania)

Janežič has received the Borštnik Award, four Sterija awards, two MESS Golden Laurel Wreath awards, two Ardalion awards, two Grand Prix Golden Lion awards, the Golden Mask, Golden Bird, and Judita awards, two Dr. Đuro Rošić awards, and several other Grand Prix, international critics' and audience awards (including the BITEF audience award for best performance), as well as awards for directing.

Janežič teaches acting and theatre directing at the Academy of Theatre, Radio, Film and Television in the University of Ljubljana (Slovenia). He is also a visiting professor at the University of Novi Sad (Serbia), at the Academy of Arts (Acting Master Class) and Faculty of Technical Sciences (Art applied to Architecture, Technique and Design). He lectured at the University of Arts in Belgrade (Serbia) within the interdisciplinary doctoral studies program (Space in Dramatic Art and Architecture of the Scenic Space), at the Academy of Arts (Acting) of the University of Osijek (Croatia), the Faculty of Humanistic Studies of the University of Primorska (Slovenia), within the postgraduate programs at the Faculty of Cognitive Sciences and the Faculty of Pedagogy (Psychodrama) of the University of Ljubljana (Slovenia), at the Oslo National Academy of Arts (Norway) and Nordic Institute of Stage and Studio – The Arts University College of Oslo (Norway), at Act – Escola de Actores – Lisbon (Portugal), in the frame of Metodi Festival (International Meeting of Acting Methods and Approaches) – Tuscany (Italy), and several other international theatre festivals (BITEF, NITRA, Desire Central Station, TESZT, MIT Fest, FIST, etc.).

== Stage productions ==
- 2015 The Man (based on the book by Viktor Frankl – "Say 'Yes' to Life: A Psychologist Experiences the Concentration Camp" ), Tovstonogov Bolshoi Drama Theater, Saint Petersburg, Russia
- 2015 Leo Tolstoy, The Death of Ivan Ilyich, Serbian National Theatre, Novi Sad, Serbia
- 2014 B. Brecht, The Threepenny Opera, Montenegrin Royal Theater Zetski dom, Cetinje, Montenegro and Serbian National Theatre, Novi Sad, Serbia
- 2013 Plato, The Apology, Dubrovnik summer festival, Dubrovnik, Croatia
- 2012 A. P. Chekhov, The Seagull, Serbian National Theatre, Novi Sad, Serbia
- 2011 John The Second, Fičo balet and Studio for Research on the Art of Acting, Bunker, Ljubljana, Slovenia
- 2009 Tatjana Gromača, The Negro, Croatian National Theatre Ivan Zajc, Rijeka, Croatia,
- 2009 Mikhail Bulgakov, Molière – The Cabal of Hypocrites, Slovenian National Theatre, Ljubljana, Slovenia
- 2008 Romeo and Public, "En-knap" and Studio for Research on the Art of Acting, Ljubljana, Slovenia
- 2008 Milena Marković, The Forest is glowing, Atelier 212 theatre, Belgrade, Serbia
- 2008 John Janez Ivan, Fičo ballet and Studio for Research on the Art of Acting, Glej theatre, Slovenia, New Dance Alliance, New York, ZDA, Moscow ballet, Moscow, Russia
- 2008 W. Shakespeare, The King Lear, Koper theatre and Presern theatre, Kranj, Slovenia
- 2007 Ljubomir Simović, The travelling troupe Šopalović, Atelier 212 theatre, Belgrade, Serbia
- 2006 Acting study 29.7.1993 – work in progress, part of the project Acting Please!, Studio for Research on the Art of Acting and Glej theatre, Ljubljana, Slovenij
- 2006 Milena Marković, Simeon the Foundling, Serbian National Theatre and Sterijino pozorje, Novi Sad, Serbia
- 2006 Peter Shaffer, Amadeus, Croatian National Theatre Ivan Zajc, Rijeka, Croatia
- 2005 No words – ("When I left, I was reminded of those scenes from Bergman"), Studio for Research on the Art of Acting and Experimental theatre Glej, Ljubljana, Slovenia, CSS Udine, Videm, Italy
- 2005 M. Maeterlinck, The Blind, Macedonian National theater, Skopje, Macedonia
- 2005 W. Shakespeare, King Lear, Atelier 212 theater, Belgrade, Serbia
- 2004 Conor McPherson, Dublin carol, Koper theater, Slovenia
- 2004 No Acting Please! – acting research, second part of the Trilogy on acting, Teatar ITD, Zagreb, Croatia
- 2003 Paula Vogel, The Baltimore waltz, Ptuj city theater, Slovenia
- 2003 Untitled, Studio for Research on the Art of Acting, Ljubljana, Slovenia
- 2003 No Acting Please! – acting research, first part of the Trilogy on acting: Norec, Slovenian youth theater, Ljubljana, Slovenia
- 2002 F. M. Dostoyevsky, Crime and Punishment, Croatian National Theatre Ivan Zajc, Rijeka, Croatia
- 2002 Theatre production of acting research program "House of peace... is like going across a field of poppies and do not think of picking a flower or What color is laugh?", Studio for Research on the Art of Acting and Slovenian youth theater, Ljubljana, Slovenia
- 2001 The Dybbuk (based on Ansky), Academy for Theatre, Radio, Film, and Television (AGRFT), Ljubljana, Slovenia
- 2001 A.P. Chekhov, The three sisters, Slovenian youth theater, Ljubljana, Slovenia
- 2001 Acting project "To act", Studio for Research on the Art of Acting, Ljubljana, Slovenia
- 2000 E. Rostand, Cyrano de Bergerac, Croatian National Theatre, Split, Croatia
- 2000 Stalker – based on the novel by Strugatsky brothers and movie by Andrei Tarkovsky, Studio for Research on the Art of Acting and Zagreb Actors Studio, Croatia, in coproduction with Festival estivo del Litorale, Kopar, Sečovlje, Croatia/Slovenia
- 1999 A.P. Chekhov, The Seagull, Slovenian youth theater, Ljubljana, Slovenia
- 1998 G. Buchner, Woyzeck, Slovenian National Theater, Nova Gorica, Slovenia
- 1998 Sophocles, Oedipus Rex, Slovenian youth theater, Ljubljana, Slovenia
- 1997 T. Janežič, We sing to thee or Emptines no. 2, Studio for Research on the Art of Acting, Ljubljana, Slovenia
- 1997 T. Janežič, Emptiness, old story from my village, Ptuj City Theater, Slovenia
- 1996 P. Shaffer, Equus, Ljubljana City Theater, Ljubljana, Slovenia
- 1995 J. Genet, The Maids, Academy for Theatre, Radio, Film, and Television (AGRFT), Ljubljana, Slovenia
- 1994 Euripides, The Phoenician Women (with scenes from Antigone by Sophocles), Academy for Theatre, Radio, Film, and Television (AGRFT), Ljubljana, Slovenia
- 1993 Sketches – research and acting sketch, art colony in Šmartno v Goriških brdih, Slovenia
- 1992 Klabund Chalk circle, SAGS, Slovenia
