= Martin Kušej =

Austrian theatre and opera director (born 1961)

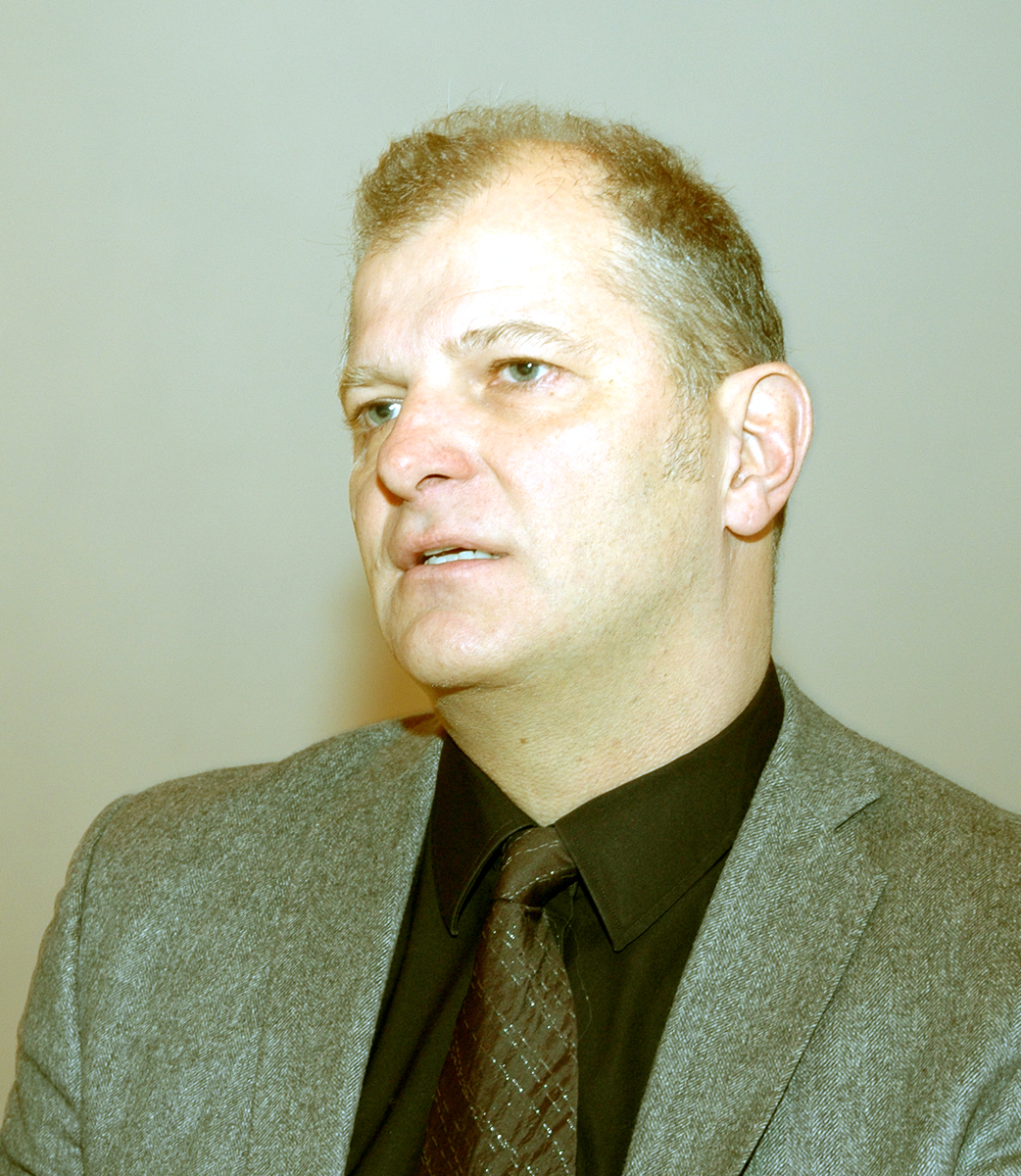
- Born: 14 May 1961 (age 65); Wolfsberg, Austria
- Occupations: theatre director, artistic director
- Website: www.martinkusej.de

Martin Kušej (born 14 May 1961) is an Austrian theatre and opera director, and was director of the Burgtheater Vienna. According to German news magazine Focus, Kušej belongs to the ten most important theatre directors who have emerged in the German-speaking world since the millennium. He is considered one of the most important directors working today, acclaimed for his dark and incisive productions.

Born into the Slovene-speaking minority in the Austrian state of Carinthia he studied German, Literature and Sport Sciences at the University of Graz from 1979 to 1982. He then moved to the local University of Music and Performing Arts and graduated from the MA course in theatre directing in 1984. His final showcase production was Ultramarine by David Brett; his Master thesis was on Robert Wilson.

In 1986, after his alternative civil service, he became an assistant director at the State Theatre in Salzburg from where he moved to the Slovenian National Theatre in Ljubljana in the same role.

Since 1990, he has been working freelance in Slovenia, Austria, Italy and Germany. Together with Austrian set designer Martin Zehetgruber and dramaturge Sylvia Brandl, he founded the independent group ’’my friend martin’’. They produced various plays for international festivals, including Franz Falsch F Falsch Dein Falsch Nichts Mehr Stille Tiefer Wald based on works by Franz Kafka.

In the 1993/1994 season he became a resident director at the Staatstheater in Stuttgart, Germany. He received the Gertrud Eysoldt Prize for young directors for his version of Intrigue and Love by Friedrich Schiller which he had directed earlier that year at Stadttheater Klagenfurt in Austria, and which had produced a major scandal with audiences leaving the theatre within the first few minutes.

In 1996 he debuted as an opera director in Stuttgart with King Arthur by Henry Purcell and John Dryden. Since then he has directed operas in the opera houses of Stuttgart, Verona, Zurich, Berlin, Munich, Vienna, Amsterdam and at the Salzburg Festival. Towards the end of his time as resident director in Stuttgart he also worked at the Burgtheater in Vienna and at Thalia Theater in Hamburg.

In 1999, he was invited to the Berliner Theatertreffen festival with his Hamburg production of Tales from the Vienna Woods by Ödön von Horváth. Since the 2000/2001 season, he has been working as a freelance director, again at the Burgtheater and at Hamburg’s Thalia Theatre, amongst others.

From 2004–06, he was the artistic director of the drama section at the Salzburg Festival, then moved on to work as a freelance opera and theatre director again in the 2006/2007 season. From 2011 to 2019, he was the artistic director of the Residenz Theatre ("Bayerisches Staatsschauspiel").

From 2019 to 2024, Kušej was director of the Burgtheater Vienna.

== Selected stage productions ==
=== Theatre ===
- 1988: Play – K-Werk, Graz
- 1988: The Sinking of the Titanic – Schauspielhaus, Graz
- 1990: Faith, Hope and Charity – Mladinsko Theatre, Ljubljana
- 1991: Scandal after Cankar – Mladinsko Theatre, Ljubljana
- 1992: The Dream as a Life – Schauspielhaus, Graz
- 1993: Intrigue and Love – Stadttheater, Klagenfurt and Staatstheater Stuttgart
- 1993: Herzog Theodor von Gotland – Staatstheater, Stuttgart
- 1994: The Prince of Homburg – Staatstheater, Stuttgart
- 1995: Die Unbekannte aus der Seine – Staatstheater, Stuttgart
- 1995: Clavigo – Staatstheater, Stuttgart
- 1996: Richard III – Volksbühne am Rosa-Luxemburg-Platz, Berlin
- 1997: Oedipus Rex – Staatstheater, Stuttgart
- 1998: Tales from the Vienna Woods – Thalia Theater, Hamburg
- 1999: Cleansed – Staatstheater, Stuttgart
- 2000: Hamlet – Salzburg Festival and Staatstheater, Stuttgart
- 2000: The Ghost Sonata – Thalia Theater, Hamburg and Stadttheater, Klagenfurt
- 2001: Belief and Home – Burgtheater, Vienna
- 2001: Edward II (play) – Thalia Theater, Hamburg
- 2002: Faith, Hope and Charity – Burgtheater, Vienna
- 2004: A Flea in Her Ear – Thalia Theater, Hamburg and Stadttheater, Klagenfurt
- 2005: König Ottokars Glück und Ende – Burgtheater, Vienna
- 2006: The Belle Vue – Thalia Theater, Hamburg and Stadttheater, Klagenfurt
- 2007: Woyzeck – Residenz Theatre, Munich
- 2009: The She-Devil – Burgtheater, Vienna
- 2011: The Vast Domain – Residenz Theatre, Munich
- 2012: Hedda Gabler – Residenz Theatre, Munich
- 2012: The Anarchist – Residenz Theatre, Munich
- 2012: The Bitter Tears of Petra von Kant – Residenz Theatre, Munich (German theatre prize Der Faust for Best Direction of a stage play)
- 2013: In Agony – Residenz Theatre, Munich and Vienna
- 2014: Goethe's Faust – Residenz Theatre, Munich
- 2015: Eugène Labiche's ICH ICH ICH – Residenz Theatre, Munich
- 2016: The Crucible by Arthur Miller – Burgtheater, Vienna
- 2017: Phädra’s Night, a project by Albert Ostermaier and Martin Kušej – Residenz Theatre, Munich
- 2018: Noises Off by Michael Frayn – Residenz Theatre, Munich
- 2025: Medea by Simone Stone & Heiner Müller – Dubrovnik Summer Festival, HNK Varaždin & SNG Maribor, Dubrovnik

=== Opera ===
- 1998: Fidelio – Staatsoper Stuttgart
- 1999: Salome – Graz Opera House
- 2001: Le convenienze ed inconvenienze teatrali – Staatsoper Stuttgart
- 2002: Don Giovanni – Salzburg Festival
- 2004: Carmen – Staatsoper, Berlin
- 2006: Shostakovich: Lady Macbeth of Mtsensk -- De Nederlandse Opera
- 2007: The Magic Flute – Zurich Opera
- 2010: The Flying Dutchman – Het Muziektheater, Amsterdam
- 2010: Rusalka - Bavarian Staatsoper, Munich
- 2012: Macbeth – Bavarian Staatsoper, Munich
- 2013: La forza del destino – Bavarian Staatsoper, Munich
- 2022: Tosca – Theater an der Wien, Vienna
