= Deutscher Bühnenverein =

Logo

The Deutscher Bühnenverein is an organization representing 430 theatres, opera houses, drama, ballet and opera companies and orchestras in Germany. It is involved in artistic, legal, organisational and political questions relevant to its members and publishes annual reports. The Deutscher Bühnenverein is based in Cologne.

== History ==
It was started in Oldenburg in 1846 under its first president Karl Theodor von Küstner, of the Königliches Schauspiel in Berlin. The Nazi Propaganda Ministry banned it in 1935 and it was not re-founded until 1947. In 1990, the East German Deutscher Bühnenbund merged with the Bühnenverein.

== Functions ==
As an association of artists' employers, the Bühnenverein negotiates with trade unions about both pay and working conditions and is involved in arbitration. It also looks after the interests of German arts organizations at international level and with regard to European Union legislation. The President since 2003 is Klaus Zehelein, currently director of the Bayerische Theaterakademie. The director and chief executive officer since 1992 is Rolf Bolwin. There are eight federal state associations.

The Bühnenverein publishes annual reports which include exhaustive statistics, not only on German theatre organizations, but also those of Austria and Switzerland.

== See also ==
- Opera America for the equivalent organization in the United States.
