= InterHarmony International Music Festival =

Music Festival

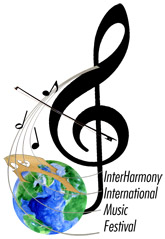

The InterHarmony International Music Festival is a summer Music Festival in Germany and Italy. The Festival is an annual intensive summer performance festival, which includes a concert series of international solo musicians and young performers, and an institute for students of solo, chamber music, and orchestral playing. The festival hosts three sessions in two locations: Acqui Terme, in the Province of Alessandria in Piedmont, Italy, and Sulzbach-Rosenberg, Germany in Bavaria.

== History ==
The InterHarmony International Music Festival was conceived in 1997, when cellist Misha Quint, the music director and founder, started his first international music festival in Blonay, Switzerland. This festival, the Intensive Cello Studies Abroad, was held at the Hindemith Foundation in Chalet de lacroix. Quint then opened the Soesterberg International Music Festival in Soesterberg, Netherlands in 1998. His festival in the Netherlands was a success and lasted for nine years. In the midst of the location in Soesterberg in 2000, the name, "InterHarmony", was born.

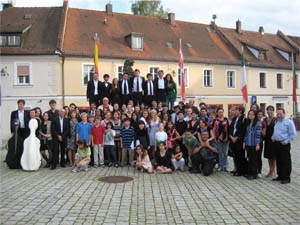
InterHarmony International Music Festival in Sulzbach-Rosenberg, Germany 2012

The festival in 2000 in Geneva, Switzerland was the first to bear this name. Other locations later took it up. Some locations, such as Soesterberg and Sulzbach-Rosenberg also retained the location name within the city as a subsidiary of InterHarmony. The Sulzbach-Rosenberg location of InterHarmony opened in 2005 and was an immediate success with local audiences. The Hinterzarten, Germany locale in the Black Forest lasted from 2008 – 2011. There were two locations in the United States: The Berkshires, Massachusetts from 2007- 2008, and San Francisco, California, at San Francisco State University in 2009.

InterHarmony remains one of the only festivals of its kind to move around the world. Many students and artists-in-residence end up traveling to all the locations, and in the case of 2012, spending nearly six weeks at the festivals.

The Festival has gained renown in Germany and brings international culture and artistry to its locations. For example, The U.S. Consul General spoke at the final concert where Misha Quint performed in 2008, and a Young Artist Showcase was given in the offices of the German Consulate in New York City in 2012. In 2010, Caitlin Hulcup, a soloist from the Vienna Staatsoper, and Christa Mayer from the Bayreuther Festspiele, performed with the InterHarmony Festival Orchestra and the Forchheimer Kammerorchester, a Symphony Orchestra in Germany.

== InterHarmony Concert Series in New York City ==
In 2015 InterHarmony International Music Festival opened the InterHarmony Concert Series with three concerts at the Weill Recital Hall at Carnegie Hall in New York City each year. The series showcases artist performers and advanced young artists who have previously performed at InterHarmony International Music Festivals in Europe.

== InterHarmony Outstanding Guest Artist series ==
In 2015 InterHarmony International Music Festival opened the InterHarmony Outstanding Guest Artist Series in its sessions in Italy and Germany. Famous musicians are invited to perform and give a master class to young artists. In 2015 the guest artists were violinist Vadim Repin and pianist Bruno Canino in Italy, and pianist Alfred Brendel gave a lecture in Sulzbach-Rosenberg, Germany. The 2017 guest artists were Nikolaj Znaider, Vadim Repin, Shlomo Mintz, Bruno Canino, Alfred Brendel, Christa Mayer, and Boris Kuschnir. In 2018, guest artists were the conductors Gerard Korsten, Christian Vasquez, and Nicoletta Conti, pianist Alfred Brendel, and violinists Nikolaj Znaider, Sergey Khachatryan, Boris Kuschnir, and mezzo-soprano Christa Mayer. The 2019 guest artists included Dmitry Sitkovetsky, Saleem Ashkar, Alfred Brendel, Guy Braunstein, Alexei Volodin, Boris Kuschnir, Lubov Stuchevskaya, Nikolaj Znaider, Christa Mayer, and Christian Vásquez.

== Artist Performers ==
Each session of InterHarmony has at least forty guest artists. Previous guest artist faculty have included the following performers:

- Guy Braunstein, Violin
- Alexei Volodin, Piano
- Dmitry Sitkovetsky, Conductor
- Christian Vásquez, Conductor
- Saleem Ashkar, Pianist
- Vadim Repin, Violin
- Alfred Brendel, Piano
- Bruno Canino, Piano
- Julian Rachlin, Violin
- Jean-Bernard Pommier, Piano
- Bella Davidovich, Piano
- Sidney Harth, Violin and Conductor
- Caitlin Hulcup, Mezzo-Soprano
- Oleh Krysa, Violin
- Boris Kuschnir, Violin
- Christa Mayer, Mezzo-Soprano
- Misha Quint, Cello
- Philippe Quint, Violin
- Nikolaj Znaider, Violin
