= Kopelman Quartet =

Russian string quartet

- Origin: Moscow, Russian Federation
- Genres: Classical
- Occupation: Chamber ensemble
- Years active: 2002–present
- Labels: Nimbus, Wigmore Live
- Members: Mikhail Kopelman (1st violin); Boris Kuschnir (2nd violin); Igor Sulyga (viola); Mikhail Milman (cello)
- Website: http://kopelmanquartet.com/

The Kopelman Quartet is a Russian string quartet founded in 2002 by Mikhail Kopelman (violin), Boris Kuschnir (violin), Igor Sulyga (viola) and Mikhail Milman (cello). They studied at the Moscow Conservatory in the 1970s, but pursued individual careers for twenty-five years before founding the quartet.

The quartet has played at many major international venues, including the Musikverein, Vienna, and the Dom Muzyki, Moscow, and appears regularly at venues such as the Concertgebouw, Amsterdam and the Wigmore Hall, London. Chamber music partners have included Elisabeth Leonskaja, Mischa Maisky and Julian Rachlin.

Festival appearances have included the Edinburgh International Festival, the Valladolid Festival, the Zürich Festival, the Colmar Festival, Prague Spring Festival, the Wimbledon Music Festival and the Ravinia Festival in the United States.

== Founder Members ==
Mikhail Kopelman, first violin, (born 1947, Uzhhorod, Ukrainian SSR, USSR), a former member of the Bolshoi Theatre orchestra and concertmaster of the Moscow Philharmonic Orchestra, was appointed first violin of the Borodin Quartet in 1976, and remained with them for twenty years. He was with the quartet in 1994 when it was awarded a Royal Philharmonic Society Music Award. From 1980-1993, Kopelman was on the faculty of the Moscow Conservatory teaching both solo violin and string quartet. He emigrated with his family to the United States in 1993, joining the Tokyo String Quartet as first violinist in 1996. From 1996-2002 he was a professor at the Yale School of Music, coaching chamber music. In 2002, he was appointed Professor of Violin at the Eastman School of Music in Rochester, New York.

Boris Kuschnir, second violin, (born 1948, Kyiv, Ukraine) is a professor at the Konservatorium Wien and also at the Universität für Musik und darstellende Kunst, Graz. His pupils have included Julian Rachlin and Nikolaj Znaider. He worked with Dmitri Shostakovich and David Oistrakh (with whom he also studied). He was a founder member of a founder member of the Moscow String Quartet (1970), the Vienna Schubert Trio (1984), and the Vienna Brahms Trio (1993). He was awarded the use of the "Rouse-Boughton" violin by Antonio Stradivari (c. 1698), belonging to Austria's central bank Oesterreichische Nationalbank, in recognition of his services to music in Austria. He is a regular jury member of a number of major international music competitions.

Igor Sulyga, viola, (born 1951, Lviv, Ukraine) was a founder member of the Moscow String Quartet (together with Boris Kuschnir) and worked with Dmitri Shostakovich on the composer's late quartets. He subsequently played in the Moscow Virtuosi Chamber Orchestra, under the directorship of Vladimir Spivakov, for twenty years and also played in Spivakov's string quartet. Sulyga moved to Spain in 1990 and teaches both viola and chamber music at the La Escuela Internacional de Música de la Fundación Príncipe de Asturias, Oviedo.

Mikhail Milman, cello, studied with Natalia Gutman and Mstislav Rostropovich and was principal cellist of the Moscow Virtuosi for twenty years. He collaborated frequently with the Borodin Quartet in concerts and recordings. After settling in Spain, he spent some years as principal cello of the Orquesta Sinfónica del Principado de Asturias, Oviedo, and is currently principal cello of the Orquesta de Córdoba.

== Discography ==
The Kopelman Quartet is recording a Shostakovich series for Nimbus Records and has also been captured on Wigmore Hall Live, the Wigmore Hall's own label.

- Shostakovich, String Quartet Nos. 3 and 7 and Prokofiev, String Quartet No. 2, Nimbus NI5762, 2006
- Shostakovich, String Quartet Nos. 1 and 8 and Myaskovsky, String Quartet No. 13, Nimbus NI5827, 2008
- Shostakovich, String quartet No. 10 and Weinberg, Piano Quintet, with Elizaveta Kopelman, Nimbus NI5865, 2009
- Tchaikovsky, String Quartet No. 3, in E flat minor and Schubert, String Quartet in D minor, "Death and the Maiden", Wigmore Hall Live WHLIVE0010, 2006
