= Warwick Fyfe =

Australian operatic heldenbaritone (born 1969)

- Born: 27 September 1969 (age 56); Canberra, Australian Capital Territory
- Occupation: Operatic baritone
- Spouse: Ruth Frances Fyfe
- Awards: Helpmann Award 2014 for Best Supporting Actor
- Website: warwickfyfe.com

Warwick Olney Fyfe (born 27 September 1969) is an Australian operatic heldenbaritone. He is known for his performance in the Wagnerian repertoire. In 2015, Fyfe was awarded a Churchill Fellowship to study Wagnerian vocal technique with coaches in Germany, US and UK.

== Education and early career ==
Born in Canberra, Fyfe attended Narrabundah College and the Canberra School of Music (ANU) between 1986 and 1987. Fyfe is an alumnus of the Victorian College of the Arts (Melbourne University) Opera Studio and a fellow of the Winston Churchill Memorial Trusts. Subsequently, he was a member of the Victoria State Opera (VSO, 1995), and Opera Australia (OA, 1998) Young Artist Programs.

On graduating, Fyfe's first professional work was with the Victoria State Opera Schools Company in 1992. Following that, he was a principal and senior principal member of the Opera Australia ensemble for many years, performing regularly at the Sydney Opera House, and the Melbourne Arts Centre.

== Career ==
Internationally, he has worked with New Zealand Opera, English Touring Opera, Welsh National Opera and Finnish National Opera. Fyfe has also performed in Singapore, Vietnam, Japan and China.

Warwick has performed Hans Sachs (for Melbourne 2025), Scarpia (for Opera Australia 2024); Alberich in Wagner's Ring cycle (in Brisbane 2023) for Opera Australia; Wotan in the Ring cycle (in Bendigo 2023) for Melbourne Opera Company, The Speaker in Gurre-Lieder (Sydney Symphony Orchestra, 2024), Vodnik (The Water King), in Rusalka, for West Australian Opera 2024 and Scarpia in Tosca for Opera Australia in Sydney.

Concert work includes performances with the Japan Philharmonic Orchestra, the Tianjin Symphony Orchestra, the Melbourne Symphony Orchestra, Sydney Symphony Orchestra, Adelaide Symphony Orchestra, Tasmanian Symphony Orchestra, Queensland Symphony Orchestra, West Australian Symphony Orchestra; the Auckland Philharmonia, New Zealand Symphony Orchestra, Warsaw National Philharmonic Orchestra, Singapore Symphony Orchestra, and the Orchestra of the Music Makers (Singapore).

== Repertoire ==
Roles performed by Warwick Fyfe

- Alberich – Das Rheingold / Siegfried / Götterdämmerung (Richard Wagner)
- Amonasro – Aida (Giuseppe Verdi)
- Athanaël – Thaïs (Jules Massenet)
- Barone di Trombonok – Il viaggio a Reims (Gioachino Rossini)
- Dr. Bartolo – The Barber of Seville (Gioachino Rossini)
- The Dutchman – Der fliegende Holländer (Richard Wagner)
- Falstaff – Falstaff (Giuseppe Verdi)
- Geronio – Il turco in Italia (Gioachino Rossini)
- Hans Sachs Die Meistersinger von Nürnberg (Richard Wagner)
- Herald – Lohemgrin (Richard Wagner)
- Klingsor – Parsifal (Richard Wagner)
- Mandryka – Arabella (Richard Strauss)
- Narrator – Gurre-Lieder (Arnold Schoenberg)
- Paolo – Simon Boccanegra (Giuseppe Verdi)
- Peter – Hansel and Gretel (Engelbert Humperdinck)
- Pizarro – Fidelio (Ludwig van Beethoven)
- Rigoletto – Rigoletto (Giuseppe Verdi)
- Sancho Panza – Don Quichotte (Jules Massenet)
- Scarpia – Tosca (Giacomo Puccini)
- Dr Schön – Lulu (Alban Berg)
- Sixtus Beckmesser – Die Meistersinger von Nürnberg (Richard Wagner)
- Water King – Rusalka (Antonín Dvořák)
- Wotan – Das Rheingold / Die Walküre / Siegfried (Richard Wagner)

== Discography ==
- Mozart, The Marriage of Figaro, Opera Australia (Opera Australia CD/DVD) EPC Distribution
- Prokofiev, The Love for Three Oranges, (Chandos CD)
- Strauss, Der Rosenkavalier, (Opera Australia CD/DVD) EPC Distribution

== Awards ==
- McDonald's Aria Sydney 1998
- Bayreuth Scholarship 2007
- Helpmann Award for Best Male in an Operatic Feature Role for his performance as Alberich in Opera Australia's 2013 bi-centenary cycles of Der Ring des Nibelungen in Melbourne
- Green Room Awards 2005 (Schaunard in La bohème, for Opera Australia)
  - 2023 (Heerrufer in Lohengrin
- Winston Churchill Fellowship 2015
