= War and Peace (disambiguation) =

War and Peace is a novel by Leo Tolstoy.

War and Peace may also refer to:

== Film and television ==
=== Adaptations of Tolstoy's novel ===
- War and Peace (1915 film), a Russian film written and co-directed by Vladimir Gardin
- War and Peace (1956 film), an American-Italian film directed by King Vidor
- War and Peace (film series), a 1966-67 Soviet film in four parts directed by Sergei Bondarchuk
- War and Peace (1972 TV series), a British series
- War and Peace (2007 miniseries), a French-Italian-German miniseries
- War & Peace (2016 TV series), a British series

=== Other ===
- War and Peace (1947 film), a Japanese film with cinematography by Yoshio Miyajima
- War and Peace (1982 film), a German film co-directed by Volker Schlöndorff
- War and Peace (2002 film) (Jang aur Aman), an Indian documentary film
- "War and Peace" (Greek), a 2008 television episode
- "War and Peace" (Northern Exposure), a 1991 television episode
- "War and Peace" (Reba), a 2003 television episode
- "War and Peace" (Roseanne), a 1993 television episode

== Music ==
- War and Peace (opera), a 1946 opera by Sergei Prokofiev, based on Tolstoy's novel
- War & Peace Vol. 1 (The War Disc), a 1998 album by Ice Cube
- War & Peace Vol. 2 (The Peace Disc), a 2000 album by Ice Cube
- War & Peace (Edwin Starr album), 1970
- War and Peace (Syd Straw album), 1996
- War and Peace, a progressive metal band led by Jeff Pilson
- "War and Peace", a song by Godsmack from The Oracle
- "War and Peace", a song by The Nice from The Thoughts of Emerlist Davjack
- "War and Peace", a song by Running Wild from The Rivalry
- War and Peace (musical), a 2013 proposed musical by Alexey Rybnikov released as a preview as "Hallelujah of Love"

== Other uses ==
- Analog's War and Peace, a 1983 anthology of science fiction stories
- War and Peace (game), a 1980 board wargame simulating Napoleonic warfare
- War and Peace (Portinari), a pair of paintings by Candido Portinari
- War and Peace: 1796–1815, a 2002 video game
- War and Peace Nebula, NGC 6357, a nebula in the constellation Scorpius
- War and Peace show, a military vehicles and collectors fair in Beltring, Kent, England
- War and Peace, an 1861 book by Pierre-Joseph Proudhon

== See also ==
- War and Pieces (disambiguation)
- War and Peas, webcomic
- "Chore and Peace", a 2016 episode of The Loud House
