= Ludmila Berlinskaya =

Russian pianist and actress

Ludmila Berlinskaya Людмила Валентиновна Берлинская
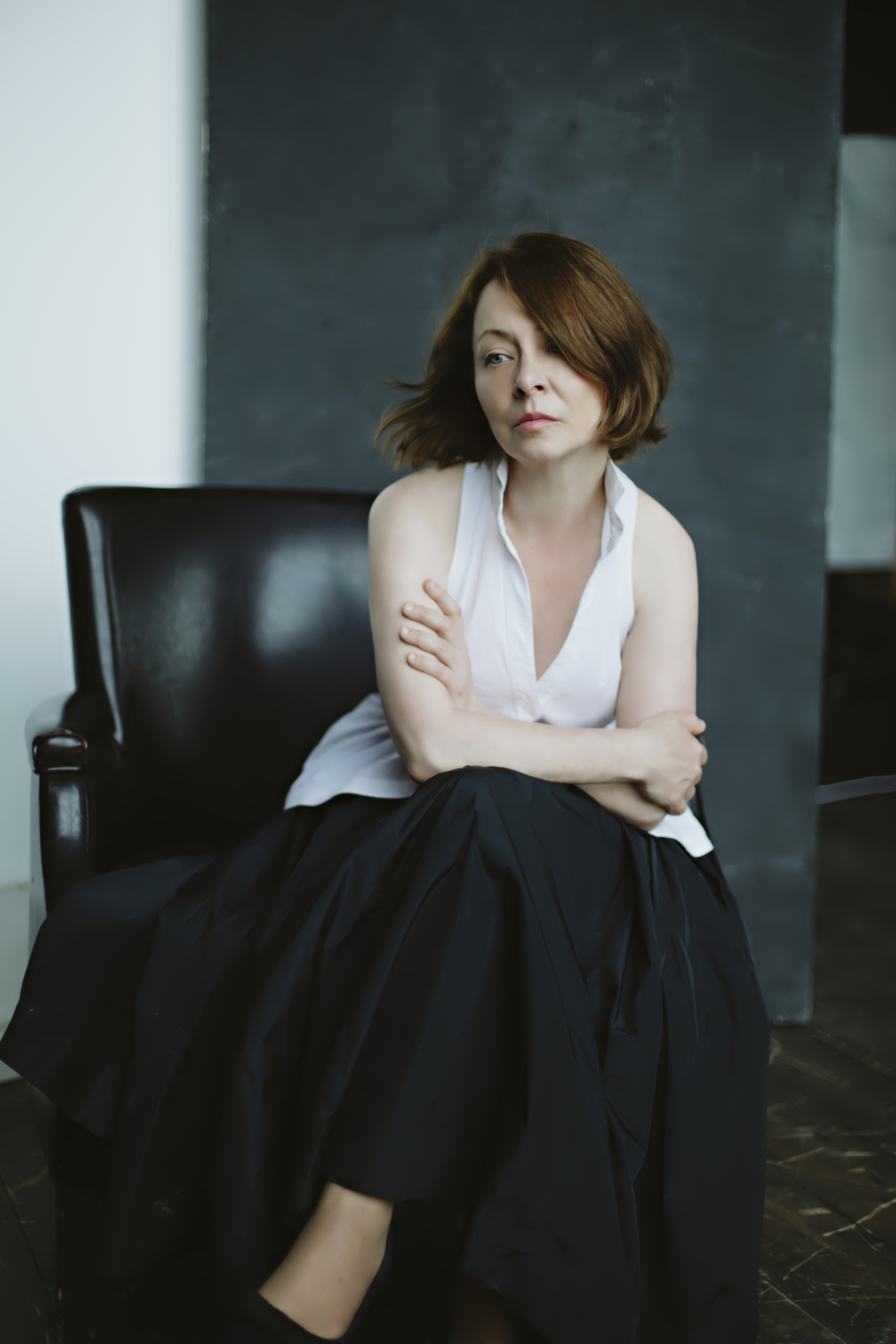
- Ludmila Berlinskaïa in 2017 © Ira Polyarnaya

Background information
- Born: Ludmila Valentinovna Berlinskaya; 1960 (age 65–66); Moscow, RSFSR; Soviet Union
- Genre: classical
- Occupation: Concert Pianist

Ludmila Valentinovna Berlinskaya (Russian: Людмила Валентиновна Берлинская; 1960, Moscow) is a Russian pianist and actress born in 1960 in Moscow. She is the daughter of cellist Valentin Berlinsky, founder of the Borodin Quartet.

== Life ==
Berlinskaya is the daughter of a lawyer mother, Zoya Ivanova, and musician father cellist Valentin Berlinsky, founder of the Borodin Quartet.

== Childhood and education ==
Her childhood was spent in the presence of the many artists and figures in the Russian intelligentsia who surrounded her parents such as composers Mieczysław Weinberg, Dmitri Shostakovich, Alfred Schnittke, Sofia Gubaidulina; instrumentalists Mstislav Rostropovich, David Oistrakh, Daniil Shafran, Yakov Zak, Aleksandr Goldenweiser, Yakov Flier; conductors Yuri Temirkanov, Yevgeny Svetlanov, Gennady Rozhdestvensky, Dmitri Kitayenko; artists Anatoly Zverev, Nikolai Silis, Vadim Sidur, Vladimir Lemporte, Rustam Khamdamov, Dmitry Krasnopevtsev, author Aleksandr Solzhenitsyn and academic Andrei Sakharov.

Ludmila Berlinskaya began playing piano at the age of five and a year later enrolled at the Gnessin Musical College in Anna Kantor's class, best known for teaching Evgeny Kissin and Nikolai Demidenko. At the age of 17 she enrolled at the Moscow Conservatory in Mikhail Voskressensky's class.

She began performing on stage with the Borodin Quartet at the age of 14; she made her orchestra debut at 15 and began touring the USSR giving solo or chamber music performances everywhere from the Baltics and Kamchatka to Ukraine and Siberia with other young talented musicians. 17‑year-old Ludmila began performing with famous musicians such as Yuri Bashmet and Viktor Tretiakov. By the age of 19 she had already performed on the greatest stages in the Soviet Union in Moscow, Saint Petersburg, Nizhny-Novgorod and other cultural capitals.

== Cinema ==
A key stage in her life came during her musical career: 13‑year-old Ludmila Berlinskaya played one of the three lead roles in the film A Great Space Voyage by Valentin Selyanov which was a phenomenal success and became the symbol of a generation. She performed the two main songs for the film (Ты мне веришь или нет; млечный путь) both composed by Alexey Rybnikov; these pop songs were and are still played on Russian radio stations on a regular basis. Ludmila Berlinskaya was then offered several roles but turned them all down in favour of music.

== The Richter years ==
15‑year-old Ludmila Berlinskaya entered the privileged circle that was the entourage of Sviatoslav Richter. Chosen and protected by him, she saw him as a spiritual father and soaked up the creative atmosphere that surrounded the artist. From the end of the 70s to the start of the 80s, she was the pianist's page turner. Besides Sviatoslav Richter's personal influence which greatly affected her future decisions, Ludmila Berlinskaya made the most of the relationship to befriend numerous artists: Yuri Borissov, Yevgeny Mravinsky, Galina Ulanova, Boris Pokrovsky, Ivan Kozlovsky, Dietrich Fischer-Dieskau, Peter Schreier, Christoph Eschenbach, Vladimir Vasiliev, Stanislav Neuhaus, Natalia Gutman, Oleg Kagan, Innokenty Smoktunovsky and others.

She made numerous appearances at Richter's festival at the Pushkin Museum of Fine Arts: the December Nights festival whose annual schedule takes the theme of an exhibition hosted by the museum in the room in which the concerts take place.

Among her many performances at the festival, she played piano four hands with Sviatoslav Richter at the event in 1985 and she replaced him at the last minute for the piano section of the Britten opera The Turn of the Screw.

Well known for his reluctance regarding competitions, Richter encouraged Ludmila Berlinskaya not to go down this route. In spite of some appearances, in which she won the top prize (top prizes in chamber music competitions in Paris and Florence; Leonardo prize), she followed his advice and stopped competing in the top international competitions.

She met the young conductor Vladimir Ziva whilst with Richter. They got married and had a son, Dmitri Berlinsky, not to be confused with the violinist of the same name. Dmitri Berlinsky is now a professional cello player.

== Paris, the festivals years ==
In 1989, Ludmila Berlinskaya moved to Paris with her second husband, Anton Matalaev, first violinist in the Anton Quartet, who had just won the Grand Prix at the Concours d'Évian. Ludmila Berlinskaya began performing with Mstislav Rostropovich in Europe on a regular basis whilst in Paris. Following their first concert at the Paris Town Hall, the then mayor's wife, Mrs Chirac, offered Ludmila Berlinskaya the chance to create a festival: the Salon Musical Russe.

Anton Matalaev and Ludmila Berlinskaya have a daughter, Macha Matalaev, born in 1991. Anton Matalev died in 2002.

The 90s were a decade of partnerships and concert performances. Ludmila Berlinskaya performed recitals and chamber music in known international venues such as Wigmore Hall and Barbican Hall in London, Concertgebouw in Amsterdam, Théâtre des Champs-Élysées and Salle Gaveau in Paris, the Moscow Conservatory, the Fenice in Venice, the Royal Academies of Brussels and Madrid plus a large number of festivals.

She specialises in chamber music and has performed with a range of musicians and ensembles, including Gautier Capuçon, Henri Demarquette, David Geringas, Alain Meunier, Pavel Gomziakov, Philippe Muller, Dominique de Williencourt, Gérard Poulet, Sarah Nemtanu, Gérard Caussé, Jean-Marc Luisada, François-René Duchâble, Paul Meyer, as well as the Modigliani Quartet, the Orlando Quartet, the Danel Quartet, the Fine Arts Quartet, the Saint Petersburg Quartet, and the Ardeo and Moraguès Quintets.

Ludmila Berlinskaya specialises in Shostakovich music having played all his chamber music for piano with partners and some of the rare pieces.

In 2001 she founded her second festival, "Printemps Musical à Paris", which was taking place in different venues in Paris. It hosted Alexandre Scriabine's Parisian creation Prométhée and for the first time in Paris after George Balanchine, Aubade by Poulenc with a dancer.

Alongside her concert performances, Ludmila Berlinskaya has been teaching at the École Normale de Musique de Paris "Alfred Cortot" since 2006.

In June 2009, she founded the Association Berlinsky following the death of Valentin Berlinsky on December 15, 2008.

== Piano-duo Berlinskaya-Ancelle ==
In 2011, she created a piano duo with her husband and French pianist Arthur Ancelle. Their recordings have received multiple awards from the international press, and they are invited by both festivals (Tokyo Spring Festival, Sommets Musicaux de Gstaad, etc.) and prestigious orchestras (Saint Petersburg Philharmonic Orchestra, Freiburg Philharmonic Orchestra, etc.).

Together, they founded the music festival “La Clé des Portes” in the setting of the Loire castles, as well as the Rungis Piano-Piano Festival [archive], entirely dedicated to the repertoire for 2 pianos and 4 hands. In 2022, they founded the Piano-Piano Academy intended for young people from around the world, and in 2023 they held a class specializing in piano duets at the Ecole Normale de Musique de Paris.

== Recordings ==
Ludmila Berlinskaya has recorded works by Rachmaninov, Glinka, Schnittke, Mendelssohn, Janáček, Strauss, Tchaikovsky, Prokofiev, Scriabin, Liszt, Schumann, Beethoven, Medtner, Ravel. Her recordings have received numerous awards, including Classica's Choc and Gramophone's Editor's Choice.

== Discography ==
Schumann: December Nights 1985 - Sviatoslav Richter, Borodin Quartet, Ludmila Berlinskaya - Melodiya (Мелодия)

Rachmaninoff: Sonata for cello, Vocalise, Trio Elegiaque - Valentin Berlinsky, Anton Matalaev, Ludmila Berlinskaya

Glinka: Piano pieces, Grand Sextet - Ludmila Berlinskaya, Borodin Quartet, Grigori Kovalevski - 2003 - Europe Arts

Schnittke: Quartet n°3, Quintet, Piano Quartet - Borodin Quartet, Ludmila Berlinskaya - Virgin Classics

Mendelssohn, Janáček, Strauss: Sonatas for violin and piano - Gérard Poulet, Ludmila Berlinskaya - 2009 - Saphir Productions

Tchaikovsky: Francesca da Rimini, Casse-Noisette - Ludmila Berlinskaya, Arthur Ancelle - 2011 - Saphir Productions

Prokofiev: Romeo & Juliet, Cinderella - Ludmila Berlinskaya, Arthur Ancelle – 2014 - Melodiya

Scriabin: Preludes, Sonatas 4 & 9, Towards the Flame, Julian Scriabin, Boris Pasternak - Ludmila Berlinskaya - 2015 - Melodiya
