= Misha Quint =

Russian-born classical cellist and music director

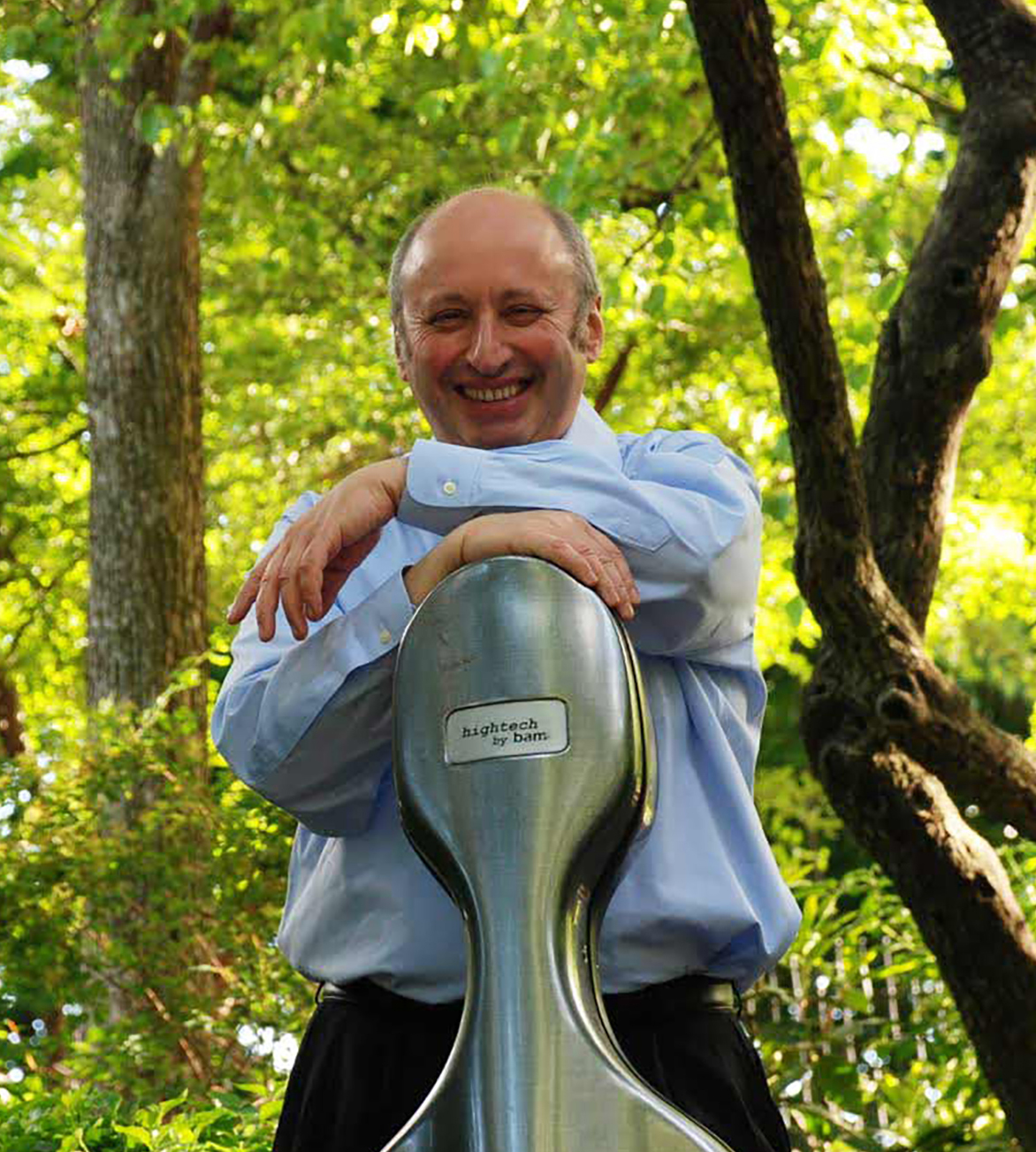
- Quint in 2019
- Born: April 27, 1960 (age 66); Leningrad
- Occupations: Cellist, music director
- Website: www.mishaquintcello.com

Misha Quint (born April 27, 1960) is a Russian-born classical cellist and music director.

== Career ==
Quint was born in Leningrad. He began cello at the age of nine and debuted with his first orchestra at the age of thirteen after winning the Boccherini Competition in St. Petersburg. He then won the International Competition in Prague and the Russian National Competition. His career as a solo cellist blossomed and he performed with renowned Russian Orchestras, such as the Moscow State Symphony, the Leningrad Philharmonic Orchestra, the Leningrad State Orchestra, the Orchestra of Classical and Contemporary Music, and the Symphony Orchestras of Latvia and Georgia.

Quint arrived in the United States in 1989. He made his New York debut at the 92nd Street Y and his orchestral debut in Avery Fisher Hall at Lincoln Center. He often performs with the Brooklyn Philharmonic. Other solo appearances include the Metropolitan Symphony, the New York Chamber Orchestra, National Irish Symphony, New York Chamber Symphony and the London Soloists Chamber Orchestra at Queen Elizabeth Hall. Quint has performed under conductors Maxim Shostakovich, Paul Lustig Dunkel, Colman Pierce, Sidney Harth, Ravil Martinov, Camilla Kolchinsky, Yakov Bergman, and Ira Levin.

Critics describe him as "a master of probing sentiment, shaded phrasing and flawless technique." Daniel Webster of the Philadelphia Inquirer writes: "[his] virtuosity provided a fresh voice" and "the Russian school of string playing has taken on a different light with Quint." Quint's radio broadcasts include appearances on WQXR's In the Listening Room and live recitals on WGBH (Boston), WMNB (NJ), WNYC (NY).

Quint has performed and premiered new pieces by famous contemporary composers such as Schnittke, Basner and Gubaidulina. He was the 2009 winner of the CRS Competition for Contemporary Music, and won three gold medals for Artist, New Release, and Album in the 2016 Global Music Awards.

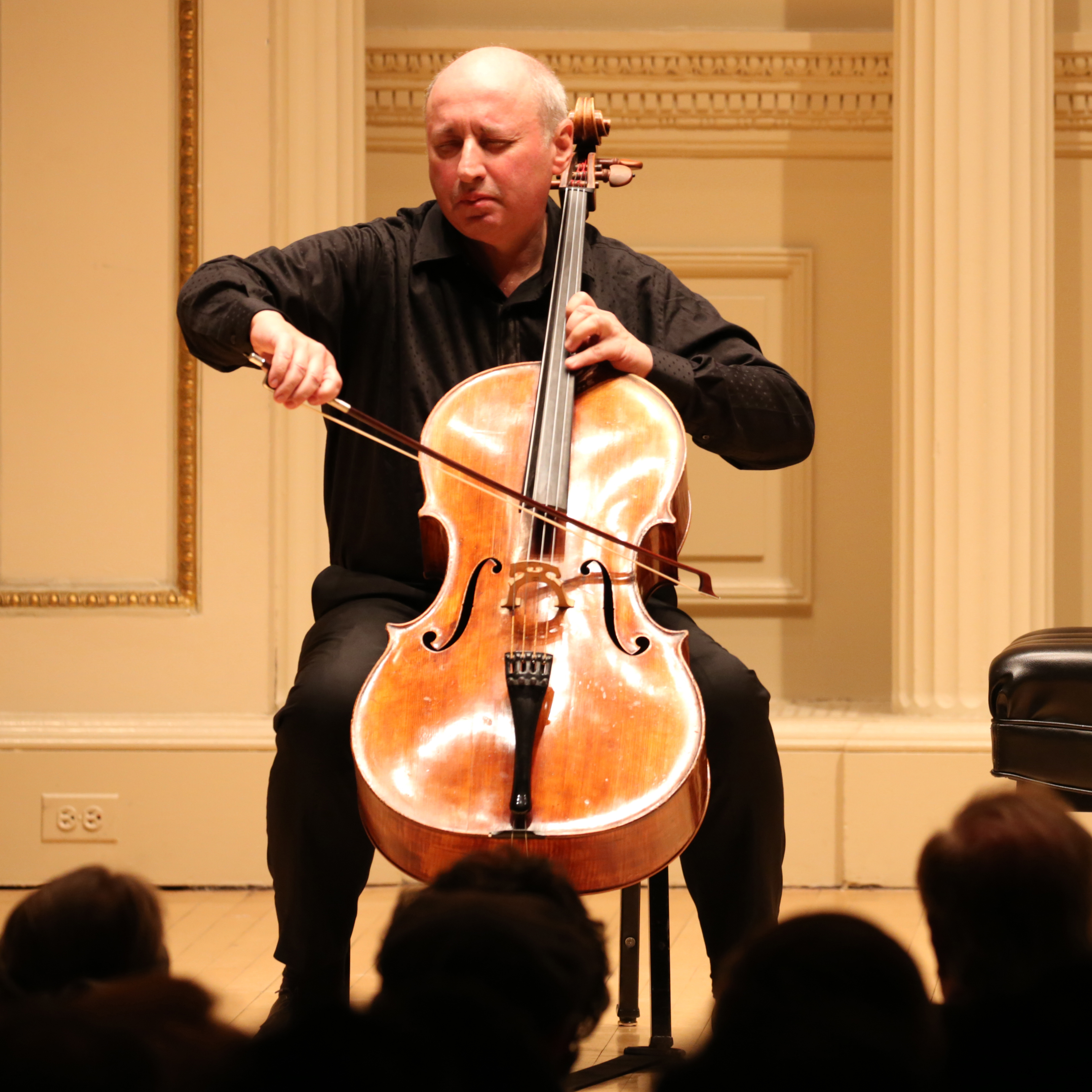
Quint in 2018

== Pedagogue ==
He is music director, founder, and teacher at the InterHarmony International Music Festival in Italy and Germany. He has been on the faculty of the International Institute of Music in Marktoberdorf, Germany, and was the music director and founder of the International Cello Festival in Blonay and Interharmony Music Festival in Geneva, Switzerland. He has given numerous concerts and master classes in England, Germany, Switzerland, Ireland and the United States.

Currently, Quint is faculty member of the Mannes College of Music Preparatory Division in New York City.

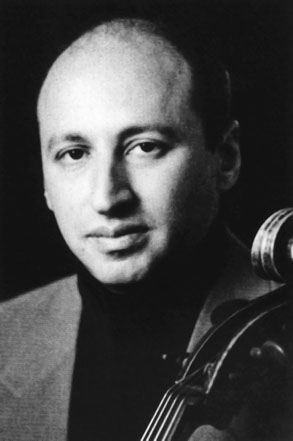
Quint in 1990

== InterHarmony International Music Festival ==
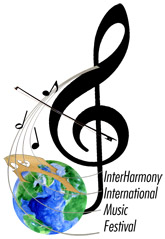
InterHarmony International Music Festival logo

Quint is the founder and music director of the InterHarmony International Music Festival. The festival is held in Acqui Terme, Piedmont, Italy, and Sulzbach-Rosenberg, Bavaria, Germany, and 2020 will be the 15th year of the festival in Sulzbach-Rosenberg and the 4th year in Acqui Terme. InterHarmony was formerly in Tuscany, Italy; Hinterzarten, Germany; San Francisco, California; and The Berkshires, Massachusetts. These are intensive performance festivals, which include public performances and master classes. InterHarmony has programs in orchestral instruments (including strings, woodwinds, brass, and percussion), piano, and voice. In 2014, InterHarmony opened an opera program with orchestra in its location in Sulzbach-Rosenberg.

The InterHarmony International Music Festival has gained renown in Germany and the U.S. Consulate General spoke at the final concert where Quint performed in 2008. Quint performed with Caitlin Hulcup, mezzo-soprano from the Vienna State Opera, and Christa Mayer, mezzo-soprano from the Bayreuther Festspiele in 2010.

In 2015, Quint and InterHarmony International Music Festival started the Outstanding Guest Artist Series, where famous musicians are invited to perform and give a master class to the young artists at InterHarmony. The most recent artists to be invited were violinist Vadim Repin, violinist Nikolaj Znaider, pianist Bruno Canino, pianist Alfred Brendel for a lecture.
