= Herbert Schachtschneider =

German operatic tenor

- Born: 5 February 1919; Allenstein, East Prussia, Weimar Republic
- Died: 26 October 2008 (aged 89); Stuttgart, Baden-Württemberg, Germany
- Education: Musikhochschule Berlin
- Occupations: Operatic tenor; Academic voice teacher
- Organizations: Cologne Opera; Hochschule für Musik Saar

Herbert Schachtschneider (5 February 1919 – 26 October 2008) was a German operatic tenor and voice teacher.

== Career ==
Born in Allenstein, East Prussia (Olsztyn, Poland), Schachtschneider grew up in Berlin and began his private singing studies in 1936, one year before graduating from high school. From 1937 to 1939 he was a student of Julius von Raatz-Brockmann at the Musikhochschule Berlin.

After the Second World War began, he was drafted into the Wehrmacht. He was captured by the British during the Allied landing in Normandy in 1944 and was not released until New Year's Eve 1948. He remained in England to study voice with Hans Nachod, a cousin of Arnold Schoenberg.

On return to Germany he appeared in revues and musicals, in television productions at NDR and at the Eutiner Festspiele. Engagements on the stages in Flensburg, Mainz and Essen followed. Finally, in 1959 he came to the Cologne Opera, directed by Oscar Fritz Schuh, where he interpreted a repertoire of German, Slavic, French and Italian operas for over 25 years. He participated in the world premiere of Nicolas Nabokov's Der Tod des Grigori Rasputin in 1959, staged by Schuh and conducted by Joseph Rosenstock. Guest performances took him to Vienna, Buenos Aires, La Scala in Milan and London. He worked with conductors such as Siegfried Köhler, Hans Swarowsky, Rafael Kubelík, Joseph Keilberth, Nello Santi and Wolfgang Sawallisch. He appeared in the first performance in the UK of Schoenberg's Von heute auf morgen, in a concert performance in 1963, conducted by Antal Doráti, and took part in the first recording of that opera, conducted by Robert Craft.

Schachtschneider's broad repertoire of roles included the Duke in Verdi's Rigoletto, the title role of his Otello, Samson in Samson et Dalila and the title role in Wagner's Tannhäuser. He sang in Wieland Wagner's staging of his grandfather's The Ring of the Nibelung in Cologne, with George London as Wotan. In Berlin he sang Mephistopheles in Busoni's Doktor Faust.

From 1972, Schachtschneider was a lecturer at the Hochschule für Musik Saar, and from 1975 he held a professorship there.

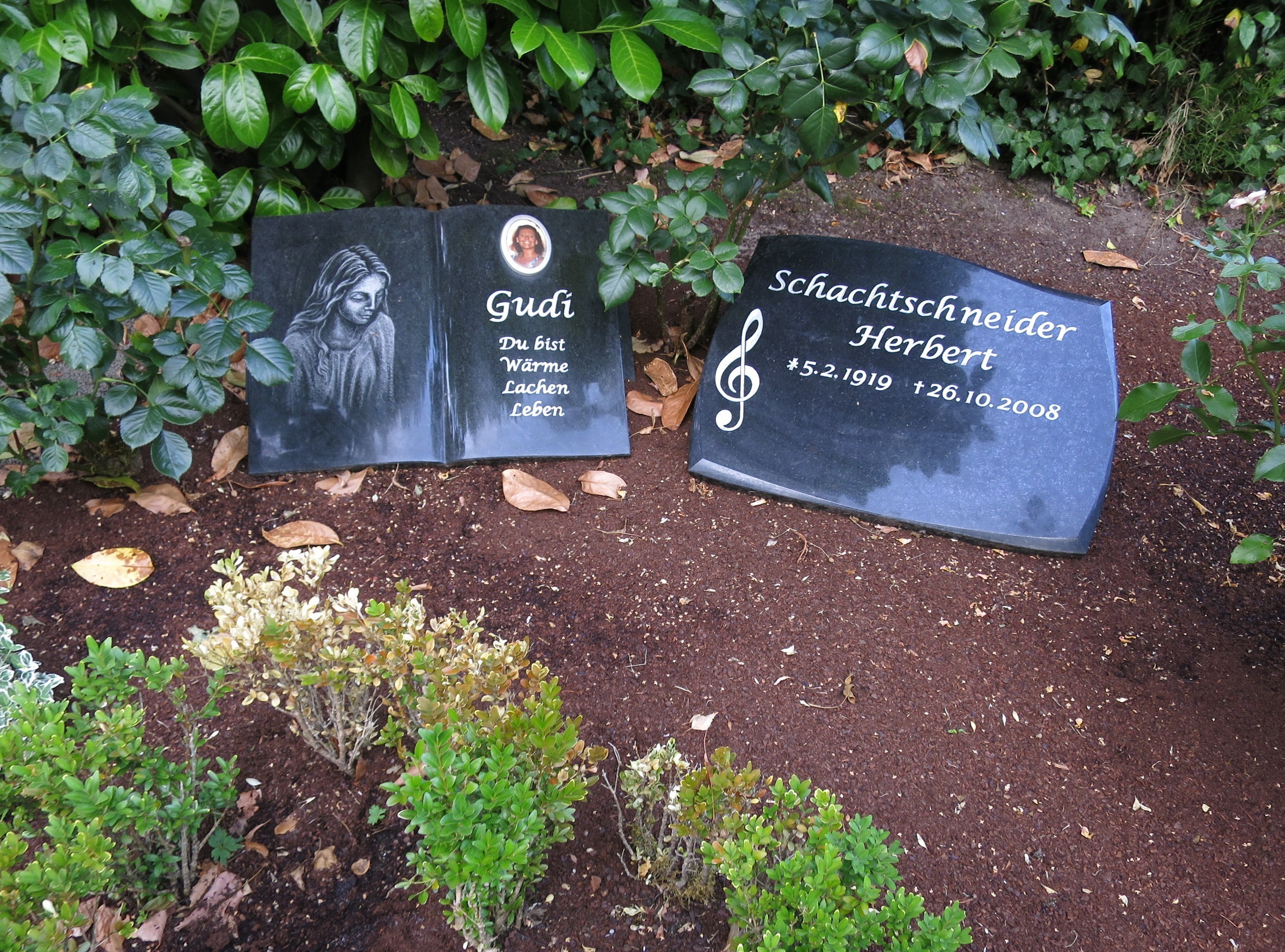
Grave in Melaten-Friedhof

Schachtschneider died in Cologne in 2008, aged 89, and was buried in the Cologne Melaten-Friedhof.

== Recordings ==
- Arnold Schönberg: Gurre-Lieder, with Inge Borkh, Herbert Schachtschneider and Kieth Engen, Rafael Kubelík, live 1965
- Richard Wagner: Lohengrin, complete recording, Hans Swarowsky, 1968, (CD Weltbild Classics, 24 April 1996)
- Hans Ulrich Engelmann: Der Fall van Damm, excerpts, Michael Gielen, 1968

== Literature ==
- Ekkehard Pluta: Die vier Tenöre – in einem. In Opernwelt September/October 2004, p. 92
