= The Big Space Travel =

1975 film directed by Valentin Selivanov

A Great Space Voyage
- Directed by: Valentin Selivanov
- Written by: Sergey Mikhalkov; Valentin Selivanov
- Based on: The First Three, or the Year of 2001 ... by Sergey Mikhalkov
- Starring: Ludmila Berlinskaya; Sergei Obrazov; Igor Sakharov; Lyusyena Ovchinnikova
- Cinematography: Vladimir Arkhangelskiy
- Music by: Alexey Rybnikov
- Production company: Gorky Film Studio
- Release date: November 5, 1975 (USSR)
- Running time: 66 minutes
- Country: Soviet Union
- Language: Russian

The Big Space Travel (Russian: Большое космическое путешествие, romanized: Bolshoe kosmicheskoye puteshestvie) is a Soviet 1975 children's science fiction film directed by Valentin Selivanov based on Sergey Mikhalkov's play The First Three, or the Year of 2001 ... (1970). The film premiered in the USSR on November 5, 1975.

== Plot ==
Three teenagers — Sveta Ishenova from Bukhara, Sasha Ivanenko from Donetsk and Muscovite Fedya Druzhinin — win the All-Union Children's Space Competition and after completing the special training course, go to the first ever children's flight on the Astra spacecraft. During the flight the only adult on the ship, Captain Egor Kalinovsky, gets sick and is placed in the isolation ward.

A series of short-term emergencies that arise shortly after this force the child astronauts to make independent decisions in conditions when erroneous actions threaten to destroy the crew and the ship.

With the honor of withstanding all the tests, the film's characters suddenly discover that the Astra is an underground simulator, and the expedition of the "first three", which has never really left Earth, is a psychological experiment designed to find out the prospects of a real children's space flight. At the same time it turns out that Fedya, who accidentally learned about the real mission of the Astra shortly before the start, hid it from Sveta and Sasha, with the objective of preventing failure of the important experiment.

Despite the fact that the "big space travel" turns out to be just a training session, all three of its participants, who at the given time find a way out of the simulator and get to the surface at the main entrance to the Flight Control Center, are met as real space heroes.

== Cast ==
- Ludmila Berlinskaya — Sveta Ishenova
- Sergei Obrazov — Fedya Druzhinin
- Igor Sakharov — Sasha Ivanenko
- Lyusyena Ovchinnikova — Fedya's mother
- Pavel Ivanov — Egor Kalinovsky, ship commander
- Ninel Myshkova — Katerina, employee of the airplane control department
- Zinaida Sorochinskaya — doctor and boy's mother
- Alexei Leonov — cameo

== Production ==
The film was shot over a period of approximately two years.

Cosmonaut Alexei Leonov served as technical advisor and as casting director. He also had a cameo role in the picture.

The film's soundtrack by beginning composer Alexey Rybnikov proved to be quite popular — it received significant airplay in the Soviet Union.
