= Gurre-Lieder =

1910 oratorio by Arnold Schoenberg

- Oratorio by Arnold Schoenberg
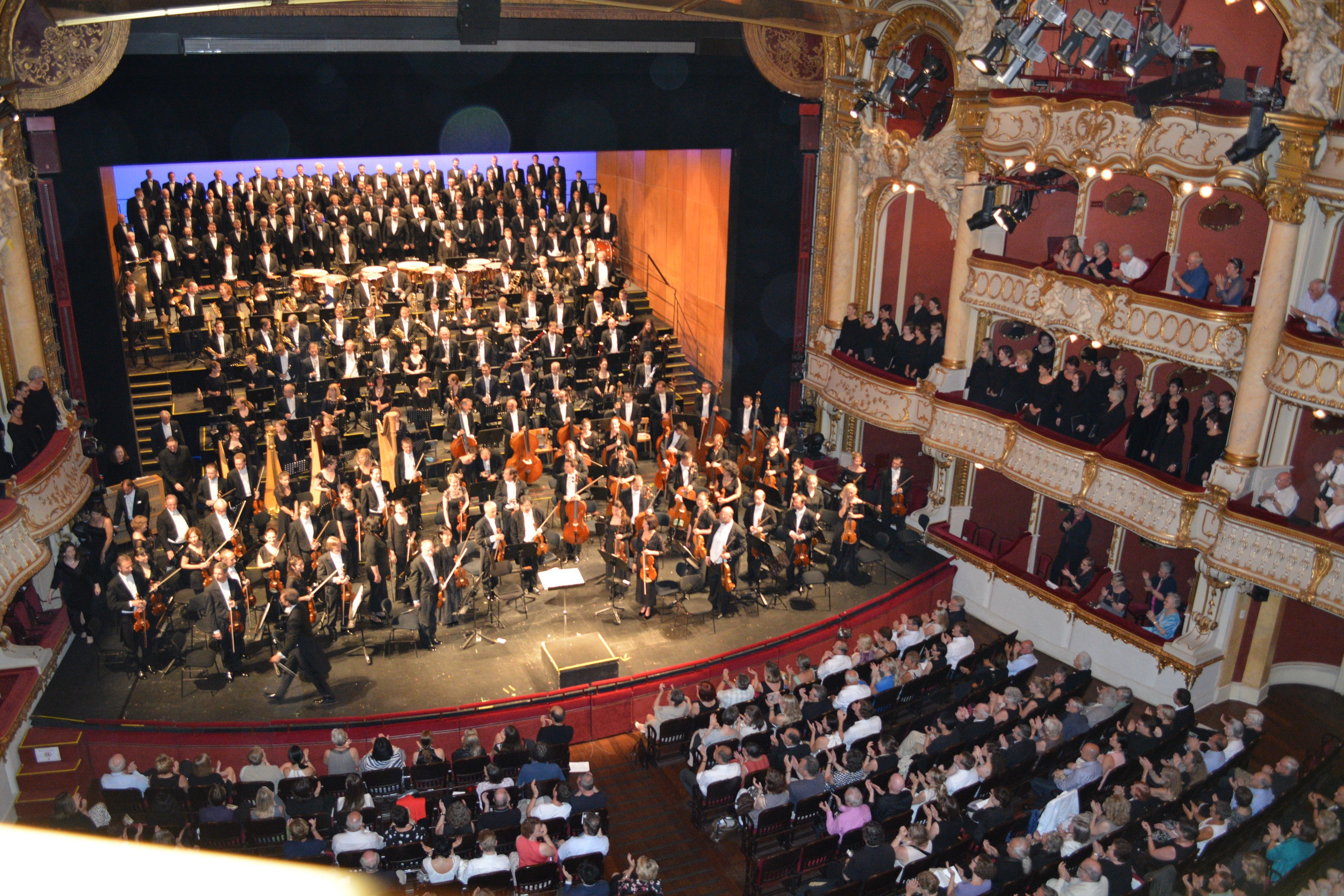
- A performance at the Graz Opera in 2013, conducted by Dirk Kaftan
- English: Songs of Gurre
- Full title: Gurre-Lieder von Jens Peter Jacobsen, Deutsch von Robert Franz Arnold, für Soli, Chor, und Orchester
- Other name: Gurrelieder
- Style: Romantic
- Text: poems by Jens Peter Jacobsen
- Language: German
- Composed: 1900–1903, 1910–1911
- Performed: 23 February 1913: Vienna
- Published: Vienna, 1920
- Publisher: Universal Edition
- Duration: at least 90 minutes
- Movements: I: 11; II: 1, III: 7; Epilogue: 3
- Scoring: 5 solo singers; narrator; mixed choir; symphony orchestra

Premiere
- Date: 23 February 1913
- Location: Musikverein
- Conductor: Franz Schreker

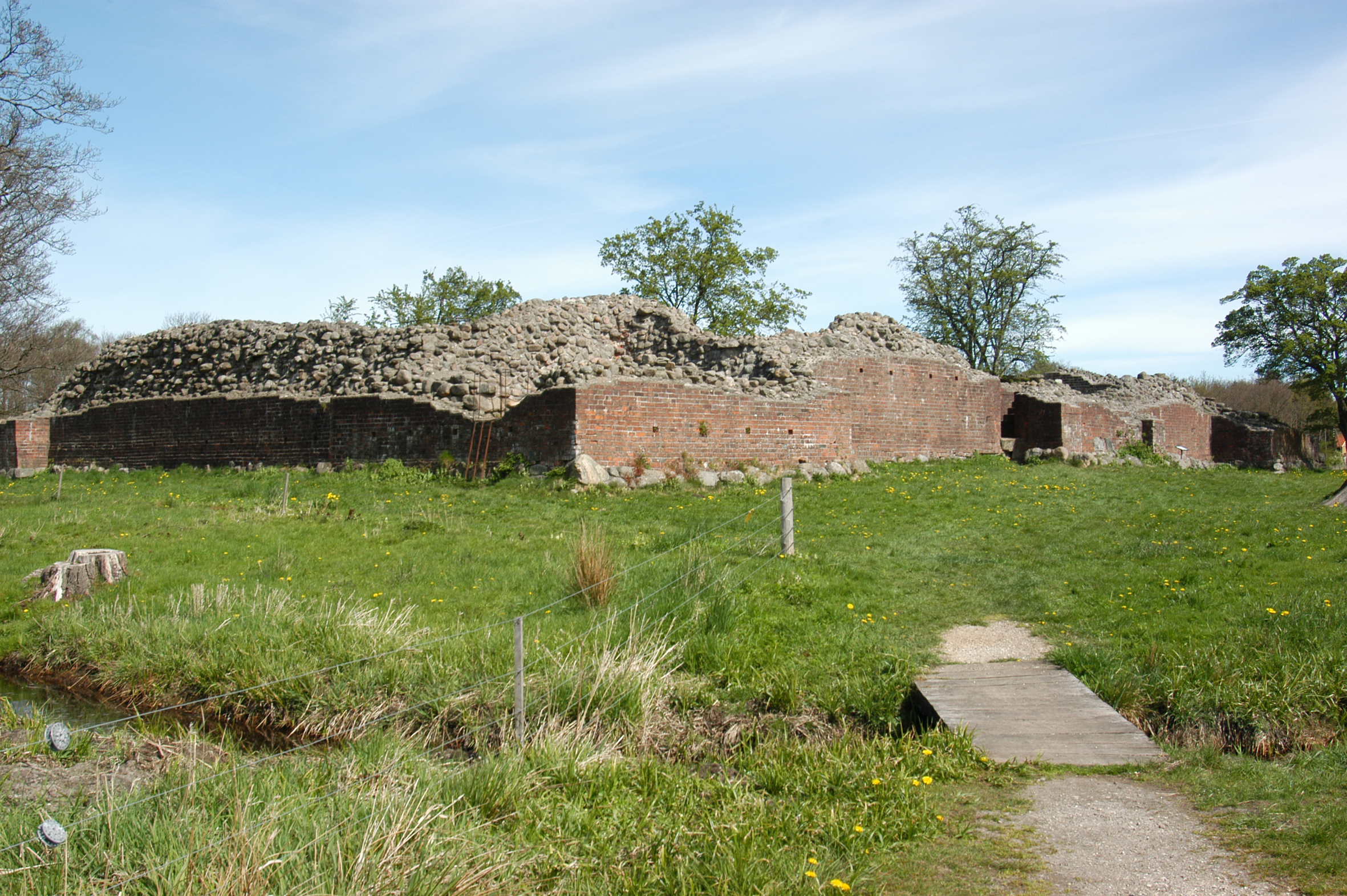
Ruins of Gurre Castle, 2007

Gurre-Lieder (Songs of Gurre) is a tripartite oratorio followed by a melodramatic epilogue for five vocal soloists, narrator, three choruses, and grand orchestra. The work, which is based on an early song cycle for soprano, tenor and piano, was composed by the then-Austrian composer Arnold Schoenberg from 1900 to 1903. After a break, he resumed orchestration in 1910 and completed it in November 1911. It sets to music the poem cycle Gurresange by the Danish writer Jens Peter Jacobsen (translated from Danish to German by Robert Franz Arnold).

The Gurre Castle and its surrounding areas in Denmark are the settings of the plot, which involves the mediæval love-tragedy (related in Jacobsen's poems) revolving around a legend of the love of king Valdemar Atterdag (Valdemar IV, 1320–1375, German: Waldemar) for his mistress, Tove, and her subsequent murder by Valdemar's jealous wife, Queen Helvig of Schleswig, (a legend which is historically more likely connected with his ancestor Valdemar I).

It is the most important tonal work of the composer, alongside Verklärte Nacht.

== Composition ==
In 1900, to enter a competition run by the Wiener Tonkünstler-Verein (Vienna Composers' Association), Schoenberg began composing Gurre-Lieder as a song cycle scored for soprano, tenor, and piano. It was written in a lush, late-Romantic style heavily influenced by Richard Wagner and Richard Strauss. According to Schoenberg, however, he "finished them half a week too late for the contest, and this decided the fate of the work." Later that year, he radically expanded his original conception, composing links between the first nine songs as well as adding a prelude, the Wood Dove's Song, and the whole of Parts 2 and 3.

By the time he returned to the piece in 1910, he had already written his first acknowledged atonal works, such as the Three Pieces for Piano, Op. 11, Five Pieces for Orchestra, Op. 16, and Erwartung, Op. 17. He had also come under the spell of Gustav Mahler, whom he had met in 1903 and whose influence may be discernible in the orchestration of the latter parts of the Gurre-Lieder. Whereas Parts 1 and 2 are clearly Wagnerian in conception and execution, Part 3 features the pared-down orchestral textures and kaleidoscopic shifts between small groups of instruments favoured by Mahler in his later symphonies. In Des Sommerwindes wilde Jagd, Schoenberg also introduced the first use of sprechgesang (or sprechstimme), a technique he would explore more fully in Pierrot lunaire of 1912. The orchestration was finally completed in November 1911.

== Premieres ==
Franz Schreker conducted the premiere of the work in Vienna on 23 February 1913. By this time, Schoenberg was disenchanted with the style and character of the piece and was even dismissive of its positive reception, saying "I was rather indifferent, if not even a little angry. I foresaw that this success would have no influence on the fate of my later works. I had, during these thirteen years, developed my style in such a manner that to the ordinary concertgoer, it would seem to bear no relation to all preceding music. I had to fight for every new work; I had been offended in the most outrageous manner by criticism; I had lost friends and I had completely lost any belief in the judgement of friends. And I stood alone against a world of enemies." At the premiere, Schoenberg did not even face the members of the audience, many of whom were fierce critics of his who were newly won over by the work; instead, he bowed to the musicians, but kept his back turned to the cheering crowd. Violinist Francis Aranyi called it "the strangest thing that a man in front of that kind of a hysterical, worshipping mob has ever done."

It would be wrong to assume that Schoenberg considered Gurre-Lieder a composition of no merit, however. A few months after the premiere he wrote to Wassily Kandinsky, "I certainly do not look down on this work, as the journalists always suppose. For although I have certainly developed very much since those days, I have not improved, but my style has simply got better ... I consider it important that people give credence to the elements in this work which I retained later."

The first Dutch performance, directed by Schoenberg himself, was in March 1921 in the Amsterdam Concertgebouw. Schoenberg's champion and former pupil, the BBC programme planner Edward Clark, invited the composer to London to conduct the first British performance on 27 January 1928, in a translation by David Millar Craig. Clark had tried to have the premiere the previous year, on 14 April 1927, but these plans fell through. Leopold Stokowski conducted the American premiere on 8 April 1932, with the Philadelphia Orchestra, soloists and chorus.

== First recording ==
Stokowski's performances on 8, 9 and 11 April 1932 were recorded 'live' by RCA Victor (see below). The 8 April performance was afflicted with ensemble and vocal errors, and the recording was never issued. The 9 April performance was recorded to 33 1/3 rpm discs and pressed at that speed in the very short-lived series of "RCA Performance Transcriptions," The company issued the 11 April performance on the conventional 78 rpm format, on 27 sides, and this remained the only recording of the work in the catalogue until the advent of the modern Long Play record. RCA Victor eventually reissued the 11 April recording on LP and CD; the 9 April performance was reissued on Pearl CDs. (Two 1961 Stokowski performances of the work would also be recorded live, though neither has been given an official release. The March 1961 recording, with the Philadelphia Orchestra, is in stereo.)

== Other performances ==
A performance of Gurre-Lieder without intermission runs over an hour and a half. Riccardo Chailly's 1990 Decca recording, for example, lasts more than 100 minutes and takes two compact discs. In 2014 the Dutch National Opera in Amsterdam was the first company to perform the Gurre-Lieder as a stage presentation, in a production directed by Pierre Audi.

== Structure ==
The cantata is divided into three parts. Whereas the first two parts are scored for solo voices and orchestra only, the third part introduces a further two soloists, a narrator, three four-part male choruses as well as a full mixed chorus.

=== Plot ===
In the first part of the work (approx. 1 hour), the love of Waldemar for Tove and the theme of misfortune and impending death are recounted in nine songs for soprano and tenor with orchestral accompaniment. A long orchestral interlude leads to the Wood Dove's Song, arguably the most famous part of the work, which tells of Tove's death and Waldemar's grief.

The brief second part (5 mins) consists of just one song in which the bereft and distraught Waldemar accuses God of cruelty. As punishment for this, God curses Waldemar and his dead men to ride across Gurre lake each night.

In the third part (approx. 45 mins), Waldemar summons his dead vassals from their graves. The undead's restless roaming and savage hunt around the castle at night is thunderously depicted by the male chorus. During this, a peasant sings of his fear of the eerie army. Waldemar then proclaims that Tove may be watching his actions from heaven. There is a humorous interlude in the grotesque song of the fool Klaus who is forced to ride with the macabre host when he would rather rest in his grave. As the sun begins to rise, the undead begin to recess back into their graves.

A gentle orchestral interlude depicting the light of dawn leads into the melodrama The Summer Wind's Wild Hunt, a narration about the morning wind, which flows into the mixed-choral conclusion Seht die Sonne! ("See the Sun!").

=== Part 1 ===
1. Orchestral Prelude
2. Nun dämpft die Dämm'rung (tenor = Waldemar)
3. O, wenn des Mondes Strahlen (soprano = Tove)
4. Ross! Mein Ross! (Waldemar)
5. Sterne jubeln (Tove)
6. So tanzen die Engel vor Gottes Thron nicht (Waldemar)
7. Nun sag ich dir zum ersten Mal (Tove)
8. Es ist Mitternachtszeit (Waldemar)
9. Du sendest mir einen Liebesblick (Tove)
10. Du wunderliche Tove! (Waldemar)
11. Orchestral Interlude
12. Tauben von Gurre! (mezzo-soprano = Wood Dove)

=== Part 2 ===
Herrgott, weißt du, was du tatest (Waldemar)

=== Part 3 ===
1. Erwacht, König Waldemars Mannen wert! (Waldemar)
2. Deckel des Sarges klappert (bass-baritone = Peasant, men's chorus)
3. Gegrüsst, o König (men's chorus = Waldemar's men)
4. Mit Toves Stimme flüstert der Wald (Waldemar)
5. Ein seltsamer Vogel ist so'n Aal (Klaus the Jester)
6. Du strenger Richter droben (Waldemar)
7. Der Hahn erhebt den Kopf zur Kraht (men's chorus)

Des Sommerwindes wilde Jagd / The Summer Wind's Wild Hunt

8. Orchestral Prelude
9. Herr Gänsefuss, Frau Gänsekraut (speaker)
10. Seht die Sonne! (mixed chorus)

== Scoring ==
Gurre-Lieder calls for exceptionally large forces: some 200 singers and 150 instrumentalists.

Voices
Narrator
Soprano (Tove)
Mezzo-Soprano (Waldtaube)
2 Tenors (Klaus-Narr and Waldemar)
Bass (Peasant)
3 4-part male choruses
8-part mixed chorus

Woodwinds
4 Piccolos (doubling Fl. 5–8)
4 Flutes
3 Oboes
2 English Horns (doubling Ob. 4, 5)
3 Clarinets in B♭ & A
2 E♭ clarinets (doubling A Cl. 4, 5)
2 Bass clarinets (doubling A Cl. 6, 7)
3 Bassoons
2 Contrabassoons

Brass
10 Horns (Hns. 7–10 doubling Wagner tubas in B♭ and F)
6 Trumpets in F, B♭ & C
Bass trumpet in E♭
Alto trombone
4 Tenor trombones
Bass trombone
Contrabass trombone
Contrabass tuba

Percussion
6 Timpani (2 players)
Tenor drum
Snare drum
Bass drum
1 pair of crash Cymbals
Suspended cymbal
Triangle
Ratchet
2 Large Iron Chains
Tam-tam
Glockenspiel
Xylophone

Keyboard
Celesta

Strings
4 Harps
Violins I, II (20 for each section)
Viola (16)
Violoncello (16)
Double bass (12)

== Recordings ==
- Leopold Stokowski (1932), with soloists Paul Althouse (Waldemar), Jeanette Vreeland (Tove), Rose Bampton (Wood Dove), Robert Betts (Klaus the Jester), Abrasha Robofsky(Peasant), Benjamin de Loache (Narrator) and choirs Princeton Glee Club, Fortnightly Club, Mendelssohn Club, Philadelphia Orchestra Chorus. Recorded live by RCA Victor at the Metropolitan Opera House in Philadelphia, in two distinct versions with the same personnel, on 9 and 11 April 1932.

Stokowski (1949) recorded the Song of the Wood-Dove in Erwin Stein's edition in 1949, with Martha Lipton, mezzo-soprano, and the New York Philharmonic (Columbia Records; reissued on Cala Records).
Stokowski (1961) returned to Gurre-Lieder in 1961 for performances in Philadelphia and again in Scotland, where he and the London Symphony Orchestra opened that year's Edinburgh International Festival with the work. Recordings of the Philadelphia and Edinburgh radio broadcasts have survived, with the 1961 Edinburgh Festival performance having been issued in 2012 on the Guild Historical label. The soloists in that performance were James McCracken (Waldemar), Gré Brouwenstijn (Tove), Nell Rankin (Wood Dove), Forbes Robinson (Peasant), John Lanigan (Klaus the Jester) and Alvar Lidell (Narrator) and chorus was Edinburg Royal Choral Union. (GHCD 2388/89).

- René Leibowitz, Chorus and Orchestra of the New Symphony Society, Paris, Richard Lewis (Waldemar), Ethel Semser (Tove), Nell Tangeman (Wood Dove), John Riley (Peasant), Ferry Gruber (Klaus the Jester), Morris Gesell (Narrator). Vox Records 222943-311 (rec. 1953, CD issue 2005, mp3 issue August 2011).
- Rafael Kubelík, Symphonie-Orchester des Bayerischen Rundfunks, Herbert Schachtschneider (Waldemar), Inge Borkh (Tove), Hertha Töpper (Wood Dove), Kieth Engen (Peasant), Lorenz Fehenberger (Klaus the Jester), Hans Herbert Fiedler (narrator), Bavarian Radio Chorus. DGG 431 744-2 (1965).
- János Ferencsik, Danish State Radio Symphony and Concert Orchestra, with Alexander Young (Waldemar), Martina Arroyo (Tove), Janet Baker (Wood Dove), Odd Wolstad (Peasant), Niels Møller (Klaus the Jester), Julius Patzak (Narrator), Chorus of Danish Radio. EMI 7243 5 74194 2 (1968; CD issue 2000).
- Pierre Boulez, BBC Symphony Orchestra, Jess Thomas (Waldemar), Marieta Napier (Tove), Yvonne Minton (Wood Dove), Siegmund Nimsgern (Peasant), Kenneth Bowen (Klaus the Jester), Günter Reich (Narrator), BBC Symphony Chorus. Columbia M2 33303 (1975).
- Gunther Schuller, New England Conservatory Orchestra, Henry Grossman (Waldemar), Phyllis Bryn-Julson (Tove), D'Anna Fortunato (Wood Dove), Keith Kibler (Peasant), Kim Scown (Klaus the Jester), Michael Steinberg (Narrator), New England Conservatory Chorus. GM Recordings GM2078 (rec. 1977).
- Seiji Ozawa, Boston Symphony Orchestra, James McCracken (Waldemar), Jessye Norman (Tove), Tatiana Troyanos (Wood Dove), David Arnold (Peasant), Kim Scown (Klaus the Jester), Werner Klemperer (Narrator), Tanglewood Festival Chorus. Philips 412 511-2 (1979).
- Herbert Kegel, Dresden Philharmonic augmented by members of the Leipzig Radio Symphony, Manfred Jung (Waldemar), Eva-Maria Bundschuh (Tove), Rosemarie Lang (Wood Dove), Ulrik Cold (Peasant), Wolf Appel (Klaus the Jester), Gert Westphal (Narrator), Berlin Radio Chorus, Leipzig Radio Chorus and Prague Male Chorus (rec. Berlin 1986: Berlin Classics 0090172BC, 1986; CD issue 1997).
- Eliahu Inbal, Radio-Sinfonie-Orchester Frankfurt am Main, Paul Frey (Waldemar), Elizabeth Connell (Tove), Jard van Nes (Wood Dove), Walton Grönroos (Peasant), Volker Vogel (Klaus the Jester), Hans Franzen (Narrator), NDR Chor, Bavarian Radio Chorus, Frankfurt Opera Chorus. Denon CO 77066-67 (1990).
- Riccardo Chailly, Radio Symphonie-Orchester Berlin, Siegfried Jerusalem (Waldemar), Susan Dunn (Tove), Brigitte Fassbaender (Wood Dove), Hermann Becht (Peasant), Peter Haage (Klaus the Jester), Hans Hotter (Narrator), Chor der St. Hedwigs-Kathedrale Berlin, Städtischer Musikverein, Düsseldorf. Decca 473 728-2 (1985).
- Zubin Mehta, New York Philharmonic, Gary Lakes (Waldemar), Éva Marton (Tove), Florence Quivar (Wood Dove), John Cheek (Peasant), Jon Garrison (Klaus the Jester), Hans Hotter (Narrator), New York Choral Artists. Sony Classical 48077 (1992).
- Claudio Abbado, Vienne Philharmonic, Siegfried Jerusalem (Waldemar), Sharon Sweet (Tove), Marjana Lipovšek (Wood Dove), Hartmut Welker (Peasant), Philip Langridge (Klaus the Jester), Barbara Sukowa (Narrator), Vienna State Opera Chorus, Arnold Schoenberg Chorus, Slovak Philharmonic Choir Bratislava. DG 439 9442 (1995)
- Giuseppe Sinopoli, Staatskapelle Dresden, Thomas Moser (Waldemar), Deborah Voigt (Tove), Jennifer Larmore (Wood Dove), Bernd Weikl (Peasant), Kenneth Riegel (Klaus the Jester), Klaus Maria Brandauer (Narrator), Dresden State Opera Chorus, MDR Radio Chorus of Leipzig, Prague Men's Chorus. Teldec 4509-98424-2 (1995).
- Robert Craft, Philharmonia Orchestra, Stephen O'Mara (Waldemar), Melanie Diener (Tove), Jennifer Lane (Wood Dove), David Wilson-Johnson (Peasant), Martyn Hill (Klaus the Jester), Ernst Haefliger (Narrator), Simon Joly Chorale. Naxos 8.557518-19 (2001).
- Simon Rattle, Berliner Philharmoniker, Thomas Moser (Waldemar), Karita Mattila (Tove), Anne Sofie von Otter (Wood Dove), Thomas Quasthoff (Peasant & Narrator), Philip Langridge (Klaus the Jester), Berlin Radio Chorus, MDR Radio Chorus of Leipzig, Ernst Senff Choir. EMI 5 5730302 (2002)
- Michael Gielen, SWR Sinfonieorchester Baden-Baden und Freiburg, Robert Dean Smith (Waldemar), Melanie Diener (Tove), Yvonne Naef (Wood Dove) Ralf Lukas (Peasant), Gerhard Siegel (Klaus the Jester), Andreas Schmidt (Narrator), Bavarian Radio Chorus, MDR Radio Chorus of Leipzig. Hänssler, Art.-Nr.: 093.198.000, 2 SACDs (rec. 2006, released 2007.).
- Esa-Pekka Salonen, Philharmonia Orchestra, Stig Andersen (Waldemar), Soile Isokoski (Tove), Monica Groop (Wood Dove), Ralf Lukas (Peasant), Andreas Conrad (Klaus the Jester), Barbara Sukowa (Narrator), Philharmonia Voices-City of Birmingham Symphony Chorus. Sigmund Records SIGCD173, 2 SACDs (Live recording 2009)
- Josep Pons, National Youth Orchestra of Catalonia and Spanish National Youth Orchestra, Nikolai Schukoff (Waldemar), Melanie Diener (Tove), Charlotte Hellekant (Wood Dove), José Antonio López (Peasant), Francisco Vas (Klaus the Jester), Barbara Sukowa (Narrator), Cor Lieder Càmera, Cor Madrigal de Barcelona, Orfeó Català, Polifònica de Puig-Reig. Deutsche Grammophon 0044007627891, 2 DVDs (rec. 2008, released 2011)
- Mariss Jansons, Symphonie-Orchester des Bayerischen Rundfunks, Stig Andersen (Waldemar), Deborah Voigt (Tove), Mihoko Fujimura (Wood Dove), Michael Volle (Peasant), Herwig Pecoraro (Klaus the Jester), Bavarian Radio Chorus, NDR Chorus, MDR Radio Chorus of Leipzig, BR-KLASSIK DVD 900110 DVD (rec. 2009, released 2010)
- Markus Stenz, Gürzenich-Orchester Köln, Brandon Jovanovich (Waldemar), Barbara Haveman (Tove), Claudia Mahnke (Wood Dove), Thomas Bauer (Peasant), Gerhard Siegel (Klaus the Jester), Johannes Martin Kränzle (Narrator), Domkantorei Köln, Männerstimmen des Kölner Domchores, Vokalensemble Kölner Dom, Chor des Bach-Vereins Köln, Kartäuserkantorei Köln. Hyperion Records CDA68081/2 (2015).
- Marc Albrecht, Netherlands Philharmonic Orchestra, Burkhard Fritz (Waldemar), Emily Magee (Tove), Anna Larsson (Wood Dove), Markus Marquardt (Peasant), Wolfgang Ablinger-Sperrhacke (Klaus the Jester), Sunnyi Melles (Narrator), Chorus of the Dutch National Opera, Pierre Audi (Director). Opus Arte OA1227D DVD & Blu-ray (2016).
- Edward Gardner, Bergen Philharmonic Orchestra and members of the Gothenburg Symphony Orchestra, Stuart Skelton (Waldemar), Alwyn Mellor (Tove), Anna Larsson (Wood Dove), James Creswell (Peasant), Wolfgang Ablinger-Sperrhacke (Klaus the Jester), Sir Thomas Allen (Narrator), Bergen Philharmonic Choir, Choir of Collegiûm Mûsicûm Bergen, Edvard Grieg Kor, Orphei Drängar, and Students from the Royal Northern College of Music, Håkon Matti Skrede (Director). Chandos 5172(2) Hybrid SA-CD (2016)
- Simon Rattle, London Symphony Orchestra, Simon O'Neill (Waldemar), Eva-Maria Westbroek (Tove), Karen Cargill (Wood Dove), Christopher Purves (Peasant), Peter Hoare (Klaus the Jester), Thomas Quasthoff (Speaker), London Symphony Chorus, CBSO Chorus, Orfeó Català. Recorded live, August 2017, Royal Albert Hall, BBC Proms; a Unitel/BBC co-production. Carnegie Hall+ streaming HD video (2017)
- Christian Thielemann, Staatskapelle Dresden and members of the Gustav Mahler Youth Orchestra, Stephen Gould (Waldemar), Camilla Nylund (Tove), Christa Mayer (Wood Dove), Markus Marquardt (Peasant), Wolfgang Ablinger-Sperrhacke (Klaus the Jester), Franz Grundheber (Narrator), MDR Radio Chorus of Leipzig, Dresden State Opera Chorus. Profil PH20052 (2020)

== See also ==
- Hans Nachod
