= Lyusyena Ovchinnikova =

Soviet actress

- Born: 10 September 1931; Olevsk, Ukrainian SSR
- Died: 8 January 1999 (aged 67); Moscow, Russia
- Occupation: Actress
- Years active: 1957—1997

Lyusyena Ivanovna Ovchinnikova (Russian: Люсье́на Ива́новна Овчи́нникова; 10 September 1931 – 8 January 1999) was a Soviet film actress. She appeared in more than 30 films between 1959 and 1993. She is an Merited Artist of the Russian Federation (1973).

== Selected filmography ==
- A Home for Tanya (1959) as Nyurka
- The Girls (1961) as Katya
- Nine Days in One Year (1962) as Nura
- An Easy Life (1964) as Masha
- The Hockey Players (1965) as Nadia Kudrichi
- Faithfulness (1965) as widow
- The Journalist (1967) as Tamara
- Strong with Spirit (1967) as Galya
- Adventures of Mowgli (1967) as Raksha
- Mama Married (1969) as Zinaida
- Big School-Break (1972) as Valya
- A Great Space Voyage (1975) as Fedya's mother
- Twenty Days Without War (1976) as Xenia Sergeevna
- Valentin and Valentina (1985) as Rita
