= Boris Kuschnir =

Ukrainian violinist (born 1948)

Boris Isaakovich Kuschnir (Russian: Борис Исаакович Кушнир; born 28 October 1948) is a Soviet-Austrian violinist.

== Background and early life ==
Born in Kiev in 1948, he studied violin with Boris Beleňkiy at the Moscow Conservatoire and chamber music with Valentin Berlinsky of the Borodin Quartet.

== Career ==
His many encounters with Dmitri Shostakovich (working on his last quartets) and David Oistrakh, with whom he also studied, had a lasting influence on his artistic development. His career started in 1969 when he was one of the three winners of the Allunions-Competition in Leningrad where, in the final, he performed the Beethoven Violin Concerto with the Leningrad Symphony Orchestra under the baton of Yuri Temirkanov. In 1970 he founded the Moscow String Quartet and remained a member until 1979.

In 1982 he became an Austrian citizen and was the first concertmaster of the Bruckner Orchestra in Linz until 1983. He was appointed professor at the Konservatorium Wien University in 1984 and became a distinguished professor at the University of Music in Graz in 1999.

In 1984 Boris Kuschnir founded the Wiener Schubert Trio.

Kuschnir founded the Vienna Brahms Trio in 1993.

He was co-founder of the Kopelman Quartet in 2002.
