= Wolfgang Ablinger-Sperrhacke =

Austrian operatic tenor

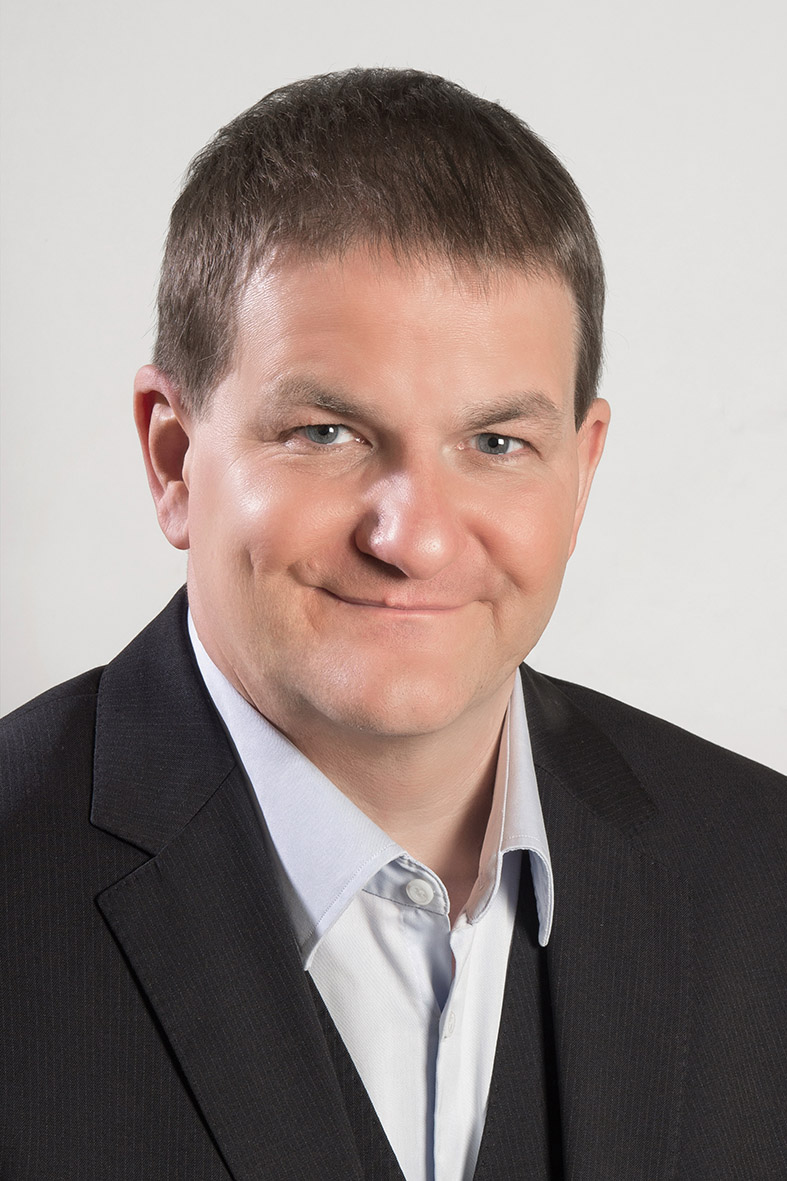
Wolfgang-Ablinger-Sperrhacke

Wolfgang Ablinger-Sperrhacke (born 1967 in Zell am See, Salzburg) is an Austrian operatic tenor.

== Life ==
Ablinger-Sperrhacke studied at the University of Music and Performing Arts, Vienna with Gerhard Kahry (voice) and Kurt Equiluz (Lied/oratorio). After first fest-contracts at Landestheater Linz (1993–1995), Theater Basel (fest-contract during season 1995/96, afterwards as guest singer till 1999/2000) and Staatstheater am Gärtnerplatz Munich (1996–1998) he has worked as a free-lance artist since 1998.

In 1997 he made his début at the Opéra National de Paris and subsequently was invited to do roles such as Goro in Madama Butterfly, Monostatos as well as First Armed Man in The Magic Flute, Capito in Mathis der Maler, Shabby Peasant in Lady Macbeth of the Mtsensk District, Mime in Der Ring des Nibelungen and also participated in the world premiere of Philippe Manoury's opera K....

At the Glyndebourne Festival Opera he sang in more than 130 performances including roles such as Vašek in The Bartered Bride, Reverend Horace Adams in Peter Grimes, Arnalta in L'incoronazione di Poppea, the Witch in Hänsel und Gretel – the two last also semistaged at the BBC Proms in the Royal Albert Hall, Tanzmeister in Ariadne auf Naxos and Podestà in La finta giardiniera.

Further important engagements:

- Valzacchi in Der Rosenkavalier (La Monnaie/Brussels, Festspiel Baden-Baden, Royal Opera House, Metropolitan Opera, Bayerische Staatsoper)
- Monostatos in The Magic Flute (Bayerische Staatsoper, De Nationale Opera)
- Dr. Cajus in Falstaff (Festival d'Aix-en-Provence, Théâtre des Champs-Elysées, Teatro Real Madrid)
- Mime in Das Rheingold (Semperoper Dresden, Teatro alla Scala, Staatsoper Unter den Linden, Salle Wilfrid-Pelletier/Montreal, De Nederlandse Opera, Tokyo Bunka Kaikan, Vienna State Opera, Bavarian State Opera)
- Mime in Siegfried (Capitole de Toulouse, Teatro Real, La Fenice, Bavarian State Opera, Munich Opera Festival, Staatsoper Stuttgart, De Nederlandse Opera, Canadian Opera Company, Vienna State Opera)
- Pedrillo in Die Entführung aus dem Serail (Festival La Coruna, Teatro Real, Teatro di San Carlo/Naples)
- Trimalchio in Maderna's Satyricon, Josef in Wiener Blut and the world-premiere of Giorgio Battistelli's Divorzio all'italiana (Opéra national de Lorraine)
- the title-role in Offenbach's Barbe-bleue (Bregenz Festival, Oper Leipzig, Komische Oper Berlin)
- Loge in Das Rheingold (Opéra national du Rhin, Lucerne Festival, Opera North)
- Aegisth in Elektra (Opéra national du Rhin, Verbier Festival, Vienna State Opera)
- Hauptmann in Wozzeck (La Scala, Bavarian State Opera, Zurich Opera, Southbank Centre, Théâtre du Capitole, Opéra national de Lorraine)
- Piet in Ligeti's Le Grand Macabre (English National Opera, Berliner Philharmonie)
- Witch (Opéra national de Lyon, Bavarian State Opera)
- Herod in Salome (Vienna Volksoper, Vienna State Opera, Zurich Opera, Opéra national du Rhin, Munich Opera Festival, Bayerische Staatsoper, Bolshoi Theatre)
- Pirzel in Die Soldaten (Salzburg Festival, Scala)
- Prinz/Kammerdiener/Marquis in Lulu (State Opera Berlin, Bavarian State Opera)
- Klaus the Fool in scenic world-premiere of Gurre-Lieder at Nederlandse Opera, Pollux in Die Liebe der Danae at Salzburg Festival,
- Ivan in The Nose at Covent Garden
- Franz I. in Krenek's Karl V. at Bavarian State Opera
- Vašek in The Bartered Bride (Bayerische Staatsoper, Münchner Opernfestspiele)
- Pluton/Aristée in Orphée aux enfers (Komische Oper)

Concerts: at Concertgebouw in Amsterdam, at Philharmonie am Gasteig, in São Paulo (Mahler's Das Lied von der Erde), Gurre-Lieder in Melbourne, Bergen, Lille, Hannover, Gothenburg, Elbphilharmonie Hamburg, Saint-Denis-Festival, Royal Festival Hall, Semperoper, and Helsinki Festival, Das Rheingold (Loge) at Leeds Town Hall, Southbank Centre, The Lowry/Manchester, The Sage/Newcastle, Royal Concert Hall, Nottingham and Symphony Hall, Birmingham.

Ablinger-Sperrhacke has worked with conductors such as Kirill Petrenko, Simone Young, Daniel Barenboim, Ingo Metzmacher, Franz Welser-Möst, Kent Nagano, Marc Albrecht, Philippe Jordan, Emmanuelle Haïm, James Conlon, Christian Thielemann, Jeffrey Tate, Robin Ticciati, Hartmut Haenchen, Antonio Pappano, Fabio Luisi, Susanna Mälkki and Vladimir Jurowski.

== Cultural-political activism ==
During the Coronavirus pandemic Ablinger-Sperrhacke lobbied for compensation-payments for freelance artists, the safe reopening of cultural institutions and respecting the freedom of the arts.

Co-founder of the Austrian initiative "Anwaltspetition für Freischaffende/Lawyer's Petition for free-lance-artists" together with Elisabeth Kulman, Tomasz Koniecny, Georg Nigl and lawyer Georg Streit, among others, he demanded a round-table for the compensations for free-lance-artists in April 2020, which took place on April 27 with representatives of the government and the biggest cultural institutions in Austria. On 05.05.2020, in a press-conference together with cultural politicians of the Austrian opposition, Thomas Drozda (SPÖ) and Sepp Schellhorn (NEOS), he criticized the lack of compensations for freelancers and that the opening perspectives for cultural venues are insufficient and violating the freedom of the arts. Public pressure initiated by this press conference and ongoing criticism from other branches of the arts, such as the cabaret scene, led to the resignation of Austrian Secretary of State for Culture, Ulrike Lunacek ten days later. Her successor, Andrea Mayer, developed, in collaboration with the Ministry of Health, the opening-steps for the Salzburg Festival which then became a role-model for theatre-openings world-wide. In June 2020 he helped negotiate the compensations at the Austrian State-theaters (Bundestheater) together with lawyer Georg Streit, Georg Nigl and Ulrike Kuner (IG Freie Theater)

From autumn 2020 onwards he intensified his cultural-political engagement in Bavaria and Germany. Through an interview he helped launch a discussion about artistic freedom in Bavaria and Germany as well and in November 2020 co-founded the German initiative "Aufstehen für die Kunst" ("Standing Up for Arts"), together with Christian Gerhaher, Hansjörg Albrecht and Kevin Conners, Ensemble-speaker of the Bavarian State-Operahouse, which is supported by international artists unions, such as the French Unisson, the Spanish ALE and the American Guild of Musical Artists (AGMA). He co-organized 2 press-conferences and gave several interviews on the matter.

In March 2021 together with other co-founders of "Aufstehen für die Kunst", as well as Anne-Sophie Mutter and Thomas Hengelbrock, he filed a Popular Lawsuit ("Popularklage") to the Bavarian Constitutional Court against the undifferentiated closures of cultural venues in Bavaria. This lawsuit is still undecided.

With 22 other applicants he filed an urgent application to the Bavarian Administrative Court, which was rejected in April 2021. In April 2021 he also participated in an urgent application to the German Constitutional Court against the German "emergency-break- law" ("Notbremsegesetz") ordering the complete closure of theaters, operahouses and concert-halls at a 7-day incidence-level of more than 100 Coronavirus cases per 100,000 people. This urgent application was postponed and then not considered by the Constitutional Court, as due to rapidly sinking incidence-levels and the successive re-openings of cultural venues the concerned fundamental rights were no longer directly affected by this law.

== Awards ==
- 2016: Nomination Dora Mavor Moore Award, outstanding performance- male/Opera division for Siegfried-Mime, Canadian Opera Company
- 2017: International Classical Music Awards, best video performance for Wozzeck (DVD, accentus music, 2017)
- 2021: Bayerischer Kammersänger
- 2022: Chevalier des Arts et des Lettres
- 2022: Österreichisches Ehrenkreuz für Wissenschaft und Kunst

== Recordings ==
DVDs:

- Alban Berg: Lulu, Prince/valet, cond.: Daniel Barenboim, dir.: Andrea Breth, Staatsoper Unter den Linden (Deutsche Grammophon, 2015)
- Alban Berg: Lulu, Prince/valet/Marquis, cond.: Kirill Petrenko, dir.: Dmitri Tcherniakov, Bavarian State Opera (Bel Air, 2017)
- Alban Berg: Wozzeck, Captain, cond.: Fabio Luisi, dir.: Andreas Homoki, Opernhaus Zürich (accentus, 2016)
- Engelbert Humperdinck: Hänsel and Gretel, Witch, cond.: Kazushi Ono, dir.: Laurent Pelly, Glyndebourne Festival (Decca, 2009)
- Claudio Monteverdi: L'incoronazione di Poppea, Arnalta, cond.: Emmanuelle Haïm, dir.: Robert Carsen, Glyndebourne Festival (Decca, 2009)
- Wolfgang Amadeus Mozart: The Magic Flute, Monostatos, cond.: Marc Albrecht, dir.: Simon McBurney, De Nationale Opera (Opus arte, 2015)
- Arnold Schoenberg: Gurre-Lieder, Klaus Narr, cond.: Marc Albrecht, dir.: Pierre Audi, De Nationale Opera (Opus arte, 2017)
- Richard Strauss: Der Rosenkavalier, Valzacchi, cond.: Christian Thielemann, dir.: Herbert Wernicke. Baden-Baden Festival (Decca, 2009)
- Richard Strauss: Ariadne auf Naxos, Dancing Master, cond.: Vladimir Jurowski, dir.: Katharina Thoma, Glyndebourne Festival (Opus arte, 2014)
- Richard Strauss: Die Liebe der Danae, Pollux, cond.: Franz Welser-Möst, dir.: Alvis Hermanis, Salzburg Festival (Euroarts, 2017)
- Giuseppe Verdi: Falstaff, Dr. Cajus, cond.: Enrique Mazzola, dir.: Herbert Wernicke, Festival d'Aix-en-Provence (arthaus musik, 2001)
- Richard Wagner: Das Rheingold, Mime, cond.: Daniel Barenboim, dir.: Guy Cassiers, Teatro alla Scala (arthaus musik, 2013)
- Bernd Alois Zimmermann: Die Soldaten, Pirzel, cond.: Ingo Metzmacher, dir.: Alvis Hermanis, Salzburg Festival (Euroarts, 2013)

CDs:

- Benjamin Britten: Peter Grimes, Reverend Horace Adams, cond.: Mark Wigglesworth, Glyndebourne Festival (Glyndebourne Label, 2010)
- Arnold Schoenberg: Gurre-Lieder, Klaus Narr, cond.: Edward Gardner, Bergen Philharmonic Orchestra (Chandos Records, 2016)
- Arnold Schoenberg: Gurre-Lieder, cond.: Christian Thielemann, Staatskapelle Dresden (Edition Staatskapelle, 2020)
- Engelbert Humperdinck: Hänsel und Gretel, Witch, cond.: Robin Ticciati, London Philharmonic Orchestra (Glyndebourne Label, 2012)
