= Yvonne Naef =

Swiss operatic singer (1957–2025)

- Born: November 9, 1957; Schaffhausen, Switzerland
- Died: December 18, 2025 (aged 68); Arlesheim, Switzerland
- Occupation: Operatic mezzo-soprano

Yvonne Naef (November 9, 1957 – December 18, 2025) was a Swiss operatic mezzo-soprano. She performed for the Zurich Opera, and later at the Royal Opera House in London and the Metropolitan Opera in New York City.

== Biography ==
Naef studied in Zürich, Basel, and Mannheim, among others with Kurt Widmer and Barbara Martig-Tüller. After making her stage debut in 1989, she held early engagements at the Stadttheater St. Gallen (1990–1993) and the Hessisches Staatstheater Wiesbaden (1993–1995).

Her international breakthrough came in 1994 in a new production of Anna Bolena by Gaetano Donizetti as Giovanna Seymour at the Opéra de Monte-Carlo. In 1995 she appeared as Giulietta in The Tales of Hoffmann by Jacques Offenbach at La Scala in Milan.

She made further debuts in Arnold Schoenberg's Moses und Aron in 1995 at the Nederlandse Opera in Amsterdam and in 1996 at the Salzburg Festival. She later returned to Salzburg as Eboli in Giuseppe Verdi’s Don Carlos (1998, 2001) and as Anna in Hector Berlioz’s Les Troyens (2000).

Naef maintained a long association with the Opernhaus Zürich. There she performed roles including Branghien in Frank Martin’s Le vin herbé (1997), Ulrica in Verdi’s Un ballo in maschera (1999), Herodias in Richard Strauss’ Salome (2000), Marfa in Modest Mussorgsky’s Khovanshchina (2002), Kundry in Richard Wagner’s Parsifal (2011), Mrs. Quickly in Verdi’s Falstaff (2011), and Geneviève in Claude Debussy’s Pelléas et Mélisande (2016).

She appeared at the Bayreuth Festival in 1997 in Wagner’s Götterdämmerung and Die Walküre.

In 2000 she made her debut at the Vienna State Opera as Eboli in Verdi’s Don Carlos. She also debuted at the Hamburg State Opera, appearing as Venus in Wagner’s Tannhäuser and the following year as Marina in Mussorgsky’s Boris Godunov.

Naef first appeared at the Théâtre des Champs-Élysées in Paris in 2002 as Adriano in Wagner’s Rienzi. In the same year she made her debut at the Royal Opera House in Covent Garden as Azucena in Verdi’s Il trovatore, followed in 2003 by Gertrude in Ambroise Thomas’ Hamlet.

In 2004 she made her debut at the Metropolitan Opera in New York City as Fricka in Wagner’s Das Rheingold. She sang there a total of 38 performances until 2009, including further Wagner roles such as Fricka in Die Walküre and Waltraute in Götterdämmerung, as well as Amneris in Verdi’s Aida.

She first appeared at the Opéra Bastille in 2005 as Brangäne in Wagner’s Tristan und Isolde, directed by Peter Sellars. Further appearances there included Don Carlos (2006), Les Troyens (2008), and Die Walküre (2010).

In addition to opera, Naef performed internationally as a concert, oratorio, and Lied singer, appearing in works such as Gustav Mahler’s Das Lied von der Erde, Johann Sebastian Bach’s Mass in B minor, Felix Mendelssohn’s Elijah, and Schoenberg’s Gurre-Lieder. During her career she collaborated with conductors including Gerd Albrecht, Sylvain Cambreling, Christoph von Dohnányi, Christoph Eschenbach, Vladimir Fedoseyev, Michael Gielen, Bernard Haitink, Mariss Jansons, James Levine, Lorin Maazel, Marc Minkowski, Roger Norrington, Nello Santi, Jeffrey Tate, Christian Thielemann, and Franz Welser-Möst.

From 2014 she taught voice as a lecturer at the Zurich University of the Arts.

== Recordings (selection) ==
- Sinfoniekonzert, Gürzenich Orchestra, 2009
- Messa da Requiem, Verdi, SWR Media, 2009
- Gurre-Lieder, Schoenberg, Hänssler, 2007
- Zaïde, Hector Berlioz, Klassik-Center Kassel, 2003
- Christmas Oratorio, Bach, Universal Music, 2000
- Petite messe solennelle, Gioachino Rossini, Edel, 2000
- Moses und Aron, Schoenberg, Polygram, 1996
