= Mikhail Kopelman =

Russian-American violinist

Mikhail Kopelman is a Russian-American violinist.

He was born in 1947 in Uzhhorod and studied at the Moscow Conservatory with professors Maya Glezarova and Yuri Yankelevich. In 1973, he was awarded 2nd prize in the Long-Thibaud-Crespin Competition.

He was a member of the Bolshoi Theatre Orchestra, and was a concertmaster of the Moscow Philharmonic Orchestra. He played first violin in the Borodin Quartet for 20 years starting in 1976. He played first violin in the Tokyo String Quartet.

Kopelman taught at the Moscow Conservatory from 1980 to 1993. He emigrated to the United States with his family in 1993. He currently is a first violin in the Kopelman Quartet, and a professor of violin at the Eastman School of Music, (Rochester, New York).
