= David Millar Craig =

English radio technician (1878–1965)

David Millar Craig (10 September 1878 – 1965) was an English radio technician.

== Background ==
Craig was born in Edinburgh. His father, John Millar Craig, was the first conductor of the Edinburgh Bach Choir and for 20 years conductor of the Glasgow Select Choir. His brother, Marshall Millar Craig, K.C., was legal secretary and chief parliamentary draftsman to the Lord Advocate.

David Millar Craig had considerable knowledge of musical and educational affairs. He was educated at Edinburgh University and studied for three and a half years at the Leipzig Conservatoire of Music in Germany, where he was awarded a diploma.

He served as a Captain in the 5th Royal Scots during the First World War, but after being gassed and wounded he took on other duties at the front. He was commanding officer in charge of the service which spread propaganda in the enemy lines by paper balloons which had such a remarkable effect on the enemy's morale in the latter stages of the war.

He had a child, Hamish Millar Craig, who was born on 25 September 1918.

== BBC career ==
Craig joined the BBC on 4 February 1924 as Assistant Controller (Scotland), to co-ordinate the work of the Glasgow (5SC) and Aberdeen (2BD) stations, and of the new Edinburgh relay station (2EH) when it opened three months later. His responsibilities also included the supervision of the Belfast Station in Northern Ireland. The Glasgow Herald described his duties:

When the new station in Edinburgh has been established it will be Mr Craig's duty to ensure that the best use is made of the programme resources of the three Scottish stations. His primary business will be to arrange for co-operation between them so that when any one station has a particularly attractive item to offer it will be made available by means of simultaneous broadcasting for the two others. In addition he is to exercise a general control over broadcasting in Scotland and to ensure that, while all possible advantage is taken of services offered by the London station, the importance of meeting national tastes is duly considered.

In April 1926, he was moved to the music department at head office.

In October 1928, he was appointed music editor of the Radio Times. He moved in 1932 to become programme editor at World-Radio, the BBC's weekly foreign and technical journal, sifting through programme listings from radio stations across the world and picking out highlights for listeners.

== Musical activities ==
David Millar Craig was well known among Edinburgh music audiences for his violoncello playing. Immediately prior to joining the BBC he was writing the analytical notes for Scottish orchestral concerts in Glasgow and Edinburgh. He published translations of songs and choruses from German, some of these were for BBC performances, including Schoenberg's Gurrelieder (27 January 1928) and Hauer's Wandlungen (3 December 1928). He also wrote libretti for ballet, as well as biographical sketches of concert celebrities.

In 1938, his translation of Das stillvernügte Streichquartett by Bruno Aulich and Ernst Heimeran (Munich, 1936) appeared in New York with H. W. Gray Co., Inc. under the title The Well-Tempered String Quartet. It is a guide to the world of string quartets intended to give counsel to players in a humorous style, sorted alphabetically by composer. It had numerous reprints until well into the 1960s. However, Craig not only translated the German text but omitted a few German composers and added a number of composers from the English-speaking world.
