= Hallelujah of Love =

Russian-language musical

Living Pictures - "War and Peace" (Russian: Zhiviye kartiny Voyna i Mir, Живые картины - Война и мир) is a Russian-language musical composed by Russian film music composer Alexey Rybnikov based upon the eponymous novel by Leo Tolstoy. The musical has yet to be produced. Scenes from the forthcoming musical were presented by the Alexey Rybnikov Theatre Company in the musical show Hallelujah of Love («Аллилуйя любви») on the stage of the Moscow International House of Music in September 2012.

Hallelujah of Love is a stage show made of old and new songs by Rybnikov. It begins with the well-known theme "I believe you" («Я тебе, конечно, верю») from the children's sci-fi movie "Great Space Journey" (ru:Большое космическое путешествие) then an "incendiary" flamenco. Then a duet by Munchhausen and Martha from the TV-film The Very Same Munchhausen, then the centre-piece, the advance excerpts from the musical Living Pictures - War and Peace. The show continues with a scene by Joaquin and Rosita, and then Rezanov and Conchita based on the love story of Nikolai Rezanov. The show continues with stylized duet in the style of French chanson, and love songs based on poems by Anna Akhmatova. The show concludes with passionate hymn to love with all the artists of the show based on the Hallelujah chorus of Handel's Messiah.

== Living pictures from War and Peace ==
The full title of the unproduced musical is Living pictures of the time of Alexander I and Napoleon Bonaparte after the novel "War and Peace" by Count Leo Tolstoy. ("Живые картины времен Александра I и Наполеона Бонапарта по роману графа Льва Толстого "Война и мир."). The shorter title Living Pictures - "War and Peace" distinguishes it from the classical opera War and Peace of Prokofiev, a central work of the Russian opera repertory. Living pictures (Zhiviye kartiny, Живые картины) is the usual term for tableaux vivants in Russian.

== Libretto ==
The staged version of the novel is a libretto written by the composer Rybnikov. The classical story of the prince Andrey Bolkonsky involved in the war of Russian Emperor Alexander the First against the French Emperor Napoleon Bonaparte, Bolkonsky's High Society life, love of young and joyful Natasha Rostova is heavily featured. The play features Moscow High Society, balls and small talks, war with cruel battles, gossips and intrigues of the Masonic lodge, Moscow beauties, warriors, Furies of war in all the huge devil merry-go-round.

== Characters ==
- Prince Andrey Bolkonsky
- Natasha Rostova
- Pierre Bezukhoff
- Anatol Kouragine
- Sonya
- Napoleon
- Alexander the First
- Helen Kouragina
- Maria
- Pelageya
- Natasha Rostova's mother
- A priest
- A deacon
- A doctor
- Liza Bolkonsky
- Dolohoff
- An Italian singer
- Rastopchin
- Vereschagin
- Others: insane people, guests, officers, soldiers, servants etc.

== Show ==
Special transforming sets with video screen installation and special screen effects are planned as well as colourful suits of the Napoleonic Era. The soloists with vocal parts, the ballet and the symphonic orchestra will take part in the performance.

Parts from the modern opera will appear on YouTube beforehand so “War and Peace” becomes the first Internet opera available worldwide before being put on stage.
