= Christa Mayer =

German operatic mezzo-soprano

Christa Mayer is a German operatic mezzo-soprano. She is particularly known for her portrayal of Erda in Richard Wagner's Ring Cycle; a role which she has performed several times at the Bayreuth Festival and recorded on the BBC Legends Record Label.

== Life and career ==
Mayer was born in Sulzbach-Rosenberg, Bavaria. After graduating from the Bavarian Academy of Singing, she pursued further studies at the Munich Academy of Music where she was a pupil of tenor Thomas Moser. She won several notable singing competitions, including prizes in the ARD International Music Competition in Munich (third prize) and the Robert Schumann International Competition for Pianists and Singers (second prize).

Upon completing her education, Mayer joined the Semperoper, Dresden. At that opera house she has performed in roles such as: Erda in the Der Ring des Nibelungen, Fenena in Nabucco, Suzuki in Madama Butterfly, Adelaide in Arabella, and Mistress Quickly in Falstaff. She portrayed the role of Schwertleite in Die Walküre at the Berlin State Opera and has also made appearances at the Deutsche Oper Berlin. She has performed at many international festivals including Rheingau Musik Festival, Schleswig-Holstein and Bad Kissingen festivals as well as Schubertiade at Schwarzenberg.

In 2001 she sang in the premiere of Rudi Spring's Heimkunft, his Chamber Symphony No. 3, after Friedrich Hölderlin in Tettnang. She performed Mahler's Kindertotenlieder at the Septembre Musical in Montreux, Switzerland in 2004 and on the request of Zubin Mehta, she sang Erda and Schwertleite at the Palau de les Arts Reina Sofía in Valencia. She also performed Maddalena in Verdi's Rigoletto in Dresden in 2008, along with Diana Damrau and Juan Diego Florez. Mayer's future roles will be Ottavia in L'incoronazione di Poppea and Gaea in Daphne. She will be singing as a guest at the InterHarmony International Music Festival in Sulzbach-Rosenberg, Bavaria with Cellist Misha Quint in 2010.

Mayer was awarded the title Sächsische Kammersängerin (Staatsoper Dresden) in 2020.
