= Tokyo String Quartet =

1969–2013 musical group

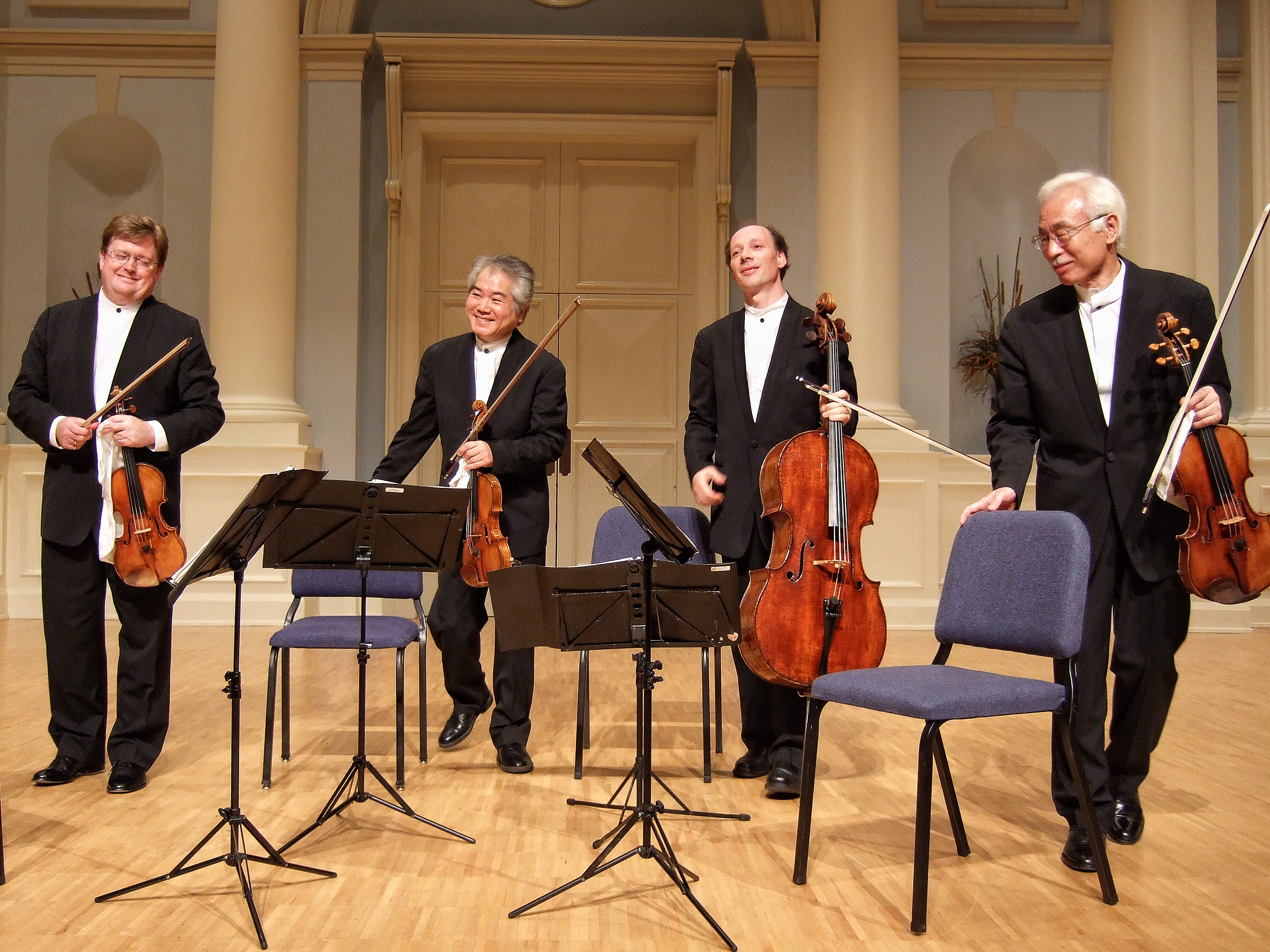
Tokyo String Quartet

The Tokyo String Quartet (東京クヮルテット) were an international string quartet that operated from 1969 to 2013.

== History ==
The group formed in 1969 at the Juilliard School of Music. The founding members attended the Toho Gakuen School of Music in Tokyo, where they studied with Professor Hideo Saito. Soon after its formation the Quartet won First Prizes at the Coleman Competition, the Munich Competition and the Young Concert Artists International Auditions. This resulted in a recording contract with Deutsche Grammophon.

The quartet recorded over 40 albums, covering a wide range of classical music. They won the Grand Prix du Disque Montreux, "Best Chamber Music Recording of the Year" awards from both Stereo Review and Gramophone magazines, and seven Grammy nominations. In addition to Deutsche Grammophon, for many years they recorded for RCA Victor Red Seal, also for Angel-EMI, CBS Masterworks, and for the last decade for Harmonia Mundi.

During their 25th anniversary international tour in 1994, the quartet performed the complete Beethoven String Quartets.

On television, the quartet appeared on "Sesame Street," "CBS Sunday Morning," PBS's "Great Performances," "National Arts," and a national broadcast from the Corcoran Gallery of Art.

The members of the quartet served on the faculty of the Yale School of Music from 1976.

The group played on a collection of instruments made by the famous luthier, Stradivari. The collection is known as the Paganini Quartet.

The quartet disbanded at the end of the 2013 season, following the decision by the violist Kazuhide Isomura, an original member, and the 2nd violinist Kikuei Ikeda to retire.

== Members ==
=== First violin ===
- 1969 Koichiro Harada
- 1981 Peter Oundjian
- 1995 Andrew Dawes
- 1996 Mikhail Kopelman
- 2002 Martin Beaver

=== Second violin ===
- 1969 Yoshiko Nakura
- 1974 Kikuei Ikeda

=== Viola ===
- 1969 Kazuhide Isomura

=== Cello ===
- 1969 Sadao Harada
- 2000 Clive Greensmith

== Discography ==
=== Studio albums ===
Year	Album details
1989	Quartet No.15 in G: Release date: 14 August 1989; Label: RCA Victor Red Seal
2013	Quartet No. 12, Op. 96, American / Quartet No. 1, From My Life: Release date: 14 May 2013; Label: Harmonia Mundi
