= Alexey Rybnikov =

Russian composer

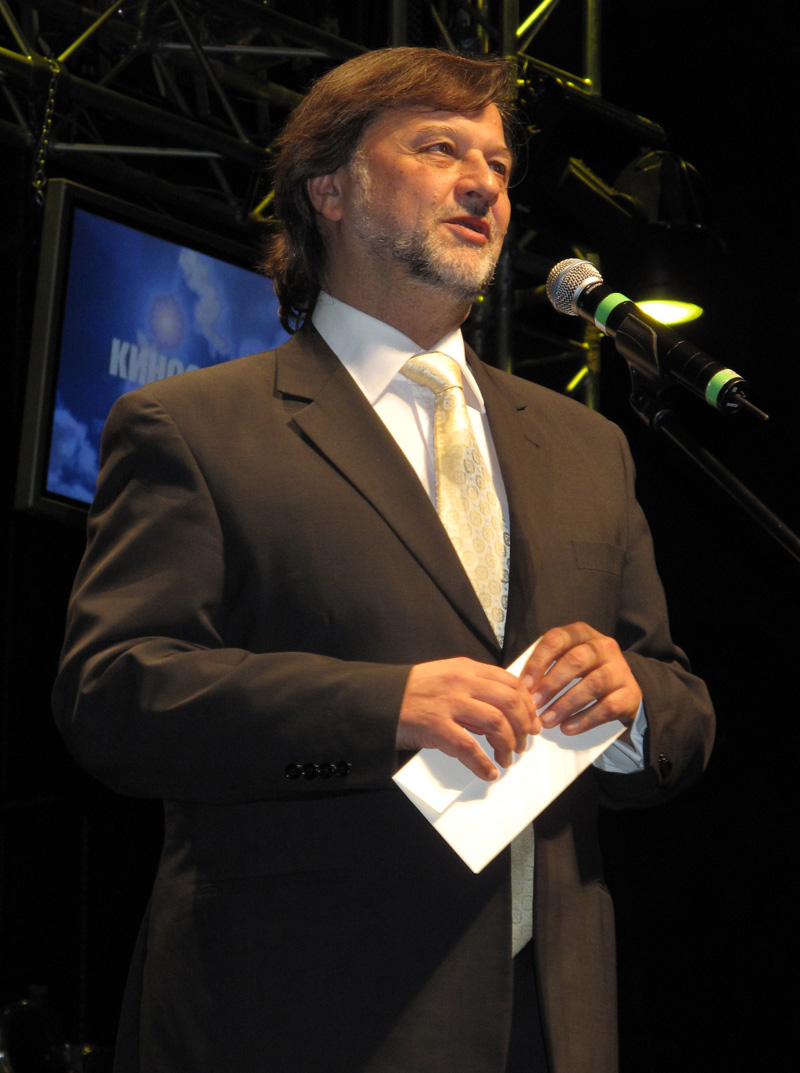
Alexey Rybnikov (2008)

Alexey Lvovich Rybnikov (Russian: Алексей Львович Рыбников; born July 17, 1945) is a modern Russian composer.

He is the author of music for Soviet and Russian musicals (rock operas) The Star and Death of Joaquin Murieta (Звезда и смерть Хоакина Мурьеты, 1976) and Juno and Avos (Юнона и Авось, 1981, shown more than 700 times), for numerous plays and operas, for more than 80 Russian movies. More than 10 million discs with his music have been sold to 1989.

== Biography ==
Alexey Rybnikov was born in Moscow on July 17, 1945. In 1962 he graduated from the Central Music School at the Moscow Conservatory. In 1967 he graduated from the Tchaikovsky Moscow Conservatory in the composition class of Aram Khachaturian.

Alexey composed one of his first works, "The Thief of Baghdad", being influenced by a very popular at those times trophy film under the same name. In 1969 Rybnikov was admitted to the Union of Soviet Composers.

In 1999, by decree of the Moscow Government, the Alexey Rybnikov Theater was established under the Moscow Committee for Culture.

In 2005 Alexey Rybnikov celebrated his 60th Anniversary by a special concert conducted by Mark Gorenstein at Chaikovsky Concert Hall. Years 2005-2008 were marked by presentations of Children Musicals composed by Alexey Rybnikov.

The entire life of Alexey Rybnikov is associated with music. But music is not the only field of activity — he has been contributing to some public projects.

Rybnikov is a President of the National Festival “The Musical Heart of the Theatre” and Russian Family Festival “Our Buratino”.

Rybnikov is a member of the United Russia party; in 2022, he supported the Russian invasion of Ukraine.

== Movie soundtracks ==
Since 1965 Alexey has already started composing movie music. Since 1979 Rybnikov has been a member of the Union of Cinematographers.

Working over the past four decades in cinematograph Rybnikov has written music for more than 100 films. Despite the huge total number of the movie works, some of them have become important milestones in Rybnikov's creative work. Among them there are soundtracks to such movies as:

- The Treasure Island (1971) by director Eugene Fridman;
- A Great Space Voyage (1975) by director Valentin Selivanov;
- The Adventures of Buratino (1975) and “About the Little Red Riding Hood. The Continuation of the Old Fairy Tale” (1977) by director Leonid Nechayev. After showing of the movie about Buratino, a musical album was released. No sooner had the records gone on sale as they were bought in a moment. A million of vinyl discs were sold out for just a year.
- Mustached Nanny (1977) by director Vladimir Grammatikov
- Per Aspera Ad Astra (film) (1981) by director Richard Viktorov
- Could One Imagine? (1981) by director Ilya Frez;
- The Very Same Munchhausen (1981) by Mark Zakharov;
- Chance (1984) by Aleksandr Mayorov;
- Hello, can you hear us? (1990) — is a filmby a Latvian director-documentalist Juris Podnieks. It produced an effect of an exploded bomb with its straightness and the truth about the modern world. The film won the Golden Lion at the festival in Venice in 1991;
- Children from the Abyss (2000) by director Pavel Chukhray.
- Star by director Nikolai Lebedev is the movie that brought to the composer all possible home awards for music in cinema and also the National Prize of the Russian Federation.
- Andersen by Eldar Ryazanov
- Rabbit Over the Abyss by Tigran Keosayan
- TV series The Case of the Dead Souls by Pavel Loungin
- Wolfhound (2006) by Lebedev
- 1612 by Vladimir Khotinenko and others.

== Rock-operas ==
Rock-opera “The Star and Death of Joaquin Murieta” with the libretto by Pavel Grushko, telling a story about life, struggle, and death of the legendary Chilean hero became the composition that opened a new — theatrical era in Rybnikov's life.

“The Star” rose on Lenkom's stage in 1976. Its director was Mark Zakharov, who had offered this project to Rybnikov. On one hand, musical innovation, strength and conviction of the young composer, his subtle perception of alien melodic culture, and bringing the world of rock-music with its hard rhythms to the home drama (!) stage provoked a prolonged reject from censors (the performance had been banned 11 times for political reasons; finally it was released). Originally, the musical sphere was closely connected with the texts from the Orthodox Prayer Book and Psalms. Rybnikov's third musical-scenic composition — “The Liturgy of the Heathens” was created during almost ten years.

== Orchestral works ==
- Fifth Symphony — “The Resurrection of the Dead”. It premiered in spring of 2005.
- Concerto grosso for soloists and chamber orchestra — “L’Oiseau bleu” and “The Northern Sphinx”, both recorded and performed by famous musicians. The first piece was written under the impression of the plays by Maeterlinck — “L’Oiseau Bleu” and “Les Fiancailles”, and became a musical embodiment of images, turned the classic drama of the beginning of the 20th century. And the second — “The Northern Sphinx” is dedicated to the personality of the Russian Emperor — Alexander the First. The historical context of the period of his rein — the beginning of the 19th century defined the musical style of composer's work.

== Theater performances and operas ==
The year 2013 is marked by the work on the stage version of the "Live Pictures of the time of Alexander I and Napoleon Bonapart" getting the new shorter name - modern opera "War and Peace".

== Awards ==
- Honored Artist of the RSFSR (1989)
- People's Artist of Russia (1999)
- State Prize of the Russian Federation (2002)
- Order of Holy Prince Daniel of Moscow (2005)
- Order of Friendship (2006)
- Russian Prize "Triumph" for the Encouragement of the highest achievements of Literature and Art (2007)
- Order of Honour (2010)
- Honorary prize "For his Contribution to the Development of Science, Culture and Art" by the Russian Authors' Society (2010)
- Order "For Merit to the Fatherland", IV degree (2016)
- Order "For Merit in Culture and Art" (2022)

Nika (2003), Golden Aries, Golden Eagle (2003), and Kinotavr cinematic awards.
