= Hans Nachod =

Austrian opera singer

Hans Nachod (1883–1965) was an Austrian operatic tenor for whom his cousin Arnold Schoenberg created the role of Waldemar in his cantata Gurre-Lieder.

Nachod was born in Vienna to a family of Jewish cantors. He made his stage debut at the Volksoper in 1907 and remained a member of the ensemble to 1910. He worked at theatres in Germany and in Prague.

In 1939, Nachod escaped the Nazi regime to London. His plans to move to the U.S. failed because of visa problems. He was interned for five months on the Isle of Man in 1940. He was a voice teacher in London until around 1950.

== Sources ==
- Arnold Schoenberg - Hans Nachod library.unt.edu
- Arnold Schoenberg - Hans Nachod Collection University of North Texas
