= Caitlin Hulcup =

Australian mezzo-soprano

- Born: Melbourne, Australia
- Education: UWA Conservatorium of Music; University of Melbourne
- Occupations: Operatic mezzo-soprano; Academic teacher
- Organizations: Royal Academy of Music; Berlin University of the Arts
- Awards: ABC Symphony Australia Young Performers Awards
- Website: www.caitlinhulcup.com

Caitlin Hulcup is an Australian mezzo-soprano, who has performed both in Australia and internationally, particularly in Europe. Beginning as a violinist, she switched to studying voice and won the ABC Symphony Australia Young Performers Awards in 2001. She gained international recognition in 2007 with her performance as Handel's Ariodante at the Barbican Centre in London and the Teatro Real in Madrid. Along with her ongoing performing career she has taught voice in London and from 2021 at the Berlin University of the Arts.

== Life and career ==
Hulcup was born in Melbourne and grew up in Perth. At age eleven she took up the violin, which she went on to study at the UWA Conservatorium of Music. She received scholarships to the UK and Canada, the latter at the Banff Center for the Arts, with her string quartet. After it broke up, she returned to Perth, switched to viola which she played in the West Australian Symphony Orchestra in 1999 and 2000, while taking up vocal studies with Molly McGurk and singing in the West Australian Opera Chorus. She earned a PhD in voice from the University of Melbourne.

=== Opera and concert ===
Hulcup was chosen by West Australian Opera as Young Artist in 2000, where she performed as Kate Pinkerton in Puccini's Madama Butterfly and as Cherubino in Mozart's The Marriage of Figaro by Mozart. She then studied voice with Anna Connolly at the Victorian College of the Arts, where she won prizes in lieder competitions. As the winner of the ABC Symphony Australia Young Performers Awards, she sang Lieder by Richard Strauss with the Tasmanian and Sydney Symphony Orchestra, broadcast on national television. Hulcup won Opera Foundation Australia's 2002 scholarship to study at the National Opera Studio in the UK at aged 28. She performed there in productions including Dorabella in Mozart's Così fan tutte and Meg Page in Verdi's Falstaff. As the winner of the Opera Foundation Australia Award, she had a residency of four months at the Vienna State Opera in 2004, making her professional European debut there as Enrichetta in Bellini's I Puritani.

Hulcup achieved international recognition in 2007, when she stepped in for Angelika Kirchschlager, who had laryngitis, as Handel's Ariodante at both the Barbican Centre in London and the Teatro Real in Madrid. She then portrayed Meg Page at the Théâtre des Champs-Élysées and reprised Ariodante at the Handel Festival in Halle, where Handel was born, and at the Theater an der Wien.

She performed in Vivaldi's Griselda in Sydney for Pinchgut Opera. In 2012 she performed in two new productions, as Donna Elvira in Mozart's Don Giovanni in Valencia and the title role of R. Strauss's Der Rosenkavalier in Florence, both conducted by Zubin Mehta. She appeared as Cyrus in Handel's Belshazzar with Les Arts Florissants conducted by William Christie in a tour of France, the UK and Spain.

In 2013, she performed as Calbo in Rossini's Maometto II at Garsington Opera, conducted by David Parry, which was recorded, and then appeared as Rosenkavalier at the Bolshoi Theatre in Moscow, conducted by Vassily Sinaisky. She portrayed Sesto in Mozart's La Clemenza di Tito in Taipei, in a new Justin Way production conducted by Benjamin Bayl.

Hulcup reprised Ariodante in 2016 with Scottish Opera conducted by Nicholas Kraemer, and also portrayed Dido in Purcell's Dido and Aeneas in 2018 with the Academy of Ancient Music conducted by Richard Egarr. She made her debut as a Wagnerian singer in the role of Fricka with the Orchestra of the Music Makers in Singapore, performing in Die Walküre in 2020 and in Das Rheingold in 2023. In 2024 she had her first engagement with Opera Australia as Idamante in Mozart's Idomeneo.

=== Teaching ===
Hulcup taught voice at the Royal Academy of Music in London from 2017 to 2020, and took up a position as professor of voice at the Berlin University of the Arts in 2021. She has given masterclasses internationally.

=== Personal life ===
Hulcup is married to Florian Thomas, an Austrian tenor. She was previously married to Malte Ebach, a paleontologist.
