= War and Pieces (disambiguation) =

War and Pieces is a 1964 Looney Tunes cartoon.

War and Pieces may also refer to:

- "War and Pieces", a 1970 animated short in the Roland and Rattfink series
- "War and Pieces", an episode of the TV series Robotboy
- "War and Pieces", a segment of The Simpsons episode "Treehouse of Horror XXI"
- War and Pieces, a story arc, and collected edition, in the comic-book series Fables
- War and Pieces, an opera by Kraig Grady
- "War and Pieces", an essay by Nicholson Baker
- War and Pieces: John Howard's Last Election, a book by Mungo Wentworth MacCallum

== See also ==
- In War and Pieces, an album by Sodom
