= Valentin Berlinsky =

Russian cellist

Valentin Aleksandrovich Berlinsky (Russian: Валентин Александрович Берлинский; January 19, 1925 – December 15, 2008) was a Russian cellist. He was a member of the Borodin Quartet in 1945 and was a member until 2007. By that time, he was the only member to have played in the Borodin Quartet from the beginning. Berlinsky played for the group for 60 years, making him the longest-serving member of what The New York Times described as being "by all accounts the longest continuously playing" string quartet in the world.

The group originally came together in 1945 as the Moscow Conservatoire Quartet with Mstislav Rostropovich on cello, Rostislav Dubinsky and Nina Barshai on first and second violins and Rudolf Barshai on viola, all members of a class taken by Mikhail Terian, the viola player of the Comitas Quartet. However, after a couple of weeks Rostropovich found he was too busy and nominated Berlinsky in his place. They signed an oath of allegiance in their own blood which Berlinsky retained. He also maintained a complete log of their many performances.

The quartet first met Dmitri Shostakovich in 1946 and became his interpreter. The group was known for its performances of all 15 quartets in the Shostakovich quartet cycle at concert halls around the world, including in 1994 at Alice Tully Hall in New York City.

The quartet was one of the Soviet Union's best known in the West during the Cold War era, through concert performances in the United States and Europe and through distribution of their recordings. As one of the most revered groups during the Communist era, the quartet performed at the funerals of both Joseph Stalin and Sergei Prokofiev, who both died on March 5, 1953.

After 20 years with the same line-up difficult times followed in the 1970s: Dubinsky emigrated to the West in 1976 and the second violinist, Jaroslav Alexandrov, retired through ill-health. Having recruited replacements, Berlinsky insisted that the ensemble spend two years out of sight until the Borodin sound had been fully recreated.

Berlinsky was a very loyal Russian. In 2000 he said: "I have never condemned those who left. It's difficult to describe in words why I stayed, but for me it was nothing to do with cheap patriotism. It was just that Russia is my fatherland; I couldn't imagine living anywhere else." For much of his life he taught at the Gnessin School of Music in Moscow, nurturing many talented young players.

Berlinsky was born in Irkutsk, Siberia, on January 19, 1925. He took violin lessons from his father, who had been a pupil of Leopold Auer and who, with his three brothers, played as the Berlinsky Quartet in that part of the Soviet Union. He was soon sent to Moscow to study at the Moscow Conservatory. He had one daughter, Ludmila Valentinovna Berlinskaya.

Valentin Berlinsky retired from the Borodin Quartet in September 2007, and was succeeded by his protégé, Vladimir Balshin, but he still remained the group's mentor.

Berlinsky died at age 83 on the night of December 15, 2008, in Moscow, after a long illness.

The quartet's oath and the complete list of their performances together with chronological events taken from his own diaries were compiled and edited by his granddaughter, Maria Matalaev, and his biography published in Valentin Berlinsky: A Quartet for Life (2018).

== Discography ==
Berlinsky, V.A. Concert Master-Class: Beethoven/Shostakovich String Quartets performed by the Dominant Quartet. Rusico DVD (NTSC) 2002
