= Nikolaj Szeps-Znaider =

Danish violinist and conductor (born 1975)

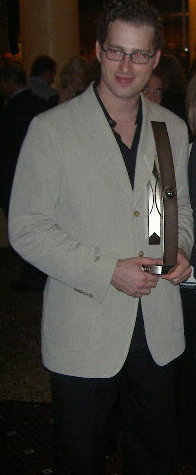

Background information
- Born: Nikolaj Szeps-Znaider; 5 July 1975 (age 51); Copenhagen, Denmark
- Genre: Classical
- Occupations: Conductor, soloist
- Instrument: Violin

Nikolaj Szeps-Znaider (Note: Szeps-Znaider has also used the name 'Nikolaj Znaider' professionally in the past.) (born 5 July 1975) is a Danish violinist and conductor.

== Biography ==
Szeps-Znaider was born in Copenhagen, Denmark to Polish-Jewish parents. His father had originally emigrated from Poland to Israel, and his mother's family had settled in Denmark before World War II. His teachers have included Milan Vitek and Boris Kuschnir.

In June 1992, Szeps-Znaider won the first prize of the 4th International Carl Nielsen International Music Competition. In 1995, he was awarded 3rd prize at International Jean Sibelius Violin Competition. In 1997, he became a 1st prize winner of the Queen Elisabeth Music Competition in Brussels. He continued his violin studies with Dorothy DeLay at the Juilliard School of Music.

In his conducting career, Szeps-Znaider counted Sir Colin Davis among his mentors. Szeps-Znaider has held principal guest conductor posts with the Swedish Chamber Orchestra and the Mariinsky Theatre Orchestra. In December 2017, Szeps-Znaider first guest-conducted the Orchestre national de Lyon. In December 2018, the orchestra announced the appointment of Szeps-Znaider as its next music director, effective September 2020, with an initial contract of 4 seasons, which has been extended through 2027.

He regularly conducts the Chicago Symphony Orchestra, New York Philharmonic, Philadelphia Symphony Orchestra, St. Louis Symphony Orchestra, Detroit Symphony Orchestra, Stockholm Philharmonic, Oslo Philharmonic, Helsinki Philharmonic, Hr-Sinfonieorchester Frankfurt, Vienna Symphony Orchestra, Cleveland Orchestra, and Los Angeles Philharmonic, as well as also frequently appearing as soloist with major orchestras.

Szeps-Znaider spent ten years as Founder and Artistic Director of the annual Nordic Music Academy summer school. He is also Viotti Visiting Professor of Music at the Royal Academy of Music, London.

Szeps-Znaider plays a Guarneri "del Gesu" violin, built in 1741, on extended loan to him by The Royal Danish Theater through the generosity of the VELUX Foundations, the Villum Fonden and the Knud Højgaard Foundation. Previously played by Fritz Kreisler, the violin is thus known as the "Ex-Kreisler Guarnerius".

== Discography ==
Szeps-Znaider has made commercial recordings for such labels as RCA Victor Red Seal and LSO Live. His discography includes the following works:

- The complete Mozart Violin Concertos with the London Symphony Orchestra, directed from the violin
- Nielsen: Violin Concerto with Alan Gilbert and the New York Philharmonic
- Elgar: Violin Concerto in B minor, with Sir Colin Davis and the Staatskapelle Dresden
- Brahms and Korngold: violin concertos, with Valery Gergiev and the Vienna Philharmonic
- Beethoven and Mendelssohn: violin concertos, with Zubin Mehta and the Israel Philharmonic
- Prokofiev, Violin Concerto No. 2, and Glazunov, Violin Concerto, with Mariss Jansons and the Bavarian Radio Symphony
- Felix Mendelssohn: Violin Concerto (DVD) with Riccardo Chailly and the Gewandhaus Orchestra
- Brahms: chamber music for violin and piano, with Yefim Bronfman

== Notes ==
Cultural offices
| Preceded by Leonard Slatkin | Music Director, Orchestre National de Lyon; 2020–present | Succeeded by incumbent |
