= Orchestra of the Music Makers =

- Orchestra
- Founded: 2008
- Location: Singapore
- Music director: Chan Tze Law
- Website: www.orchestra.sg

The Orchestra of the Music Makers (OMM) is a Singaporean symphony orchestra composed of both volunteer and professional young musicians. It performed its first concert in August 2008 in the Victoria Concert Hall and has been hailed as one of "Singapore's greatest musical glories" and was the recipient of the 2009 HSBC Youth Excellence Award. It has since performed at the Singapore Arts Festival, Lichfield Music Festival and the Cheltenham Music Festival in the United Kingdom.

== History ==
The Orchestra of the Music Makers' name is derived from the poem Ode by Arthur O'Shaughnessy, which reads:

We are the music makers,
And we are the dreamers of dreams,
Wandering by lone sea-breakers,
And sitting by desolate streams

The poem was chosen because of its inspiring message, expressing well the group's 'ambition and desires', and it implicitly identified itself with the goals of a new orchestra composed of youthful musicians in support of others like them.

The orchestra was formed after a period of discussion in early 2008 and was established as the Orchestra of the Music Makers in August 2008. Its first performance was a major benefit concert held in Singapore's Victoria Concert Hall and supported by the Singapore branch of HSBC, a considerable accomplishment for an orchestra without a proven track record. In this inaugural concert it accompanied Gabriel Ng, Clare Yeo, and Janani Sridhar, three of Singapore's young talented soloists in concerti and arias. Among other high-profile guests at the event was the President of Singapore. However, the orchestra's first concert on its own was in January 2009, when it performed at the Yong Siew Toh Conservatory of Music Concert Hall.

During these initial months and throughout most of its first year it faced considerable monetary challenges relating to its operating costs, in particular, concerning the rental of performance venues. rehearsal spaces, and instruments. In August 2009, the month of the first anniversary of its inaugural concert, the orchestra was guerdoned with the prestigious HSBC Youth Excellence Award, carrying a cash value of S$200,000, a very significant achievement given that the group had been in existence for only slightly over one year. The award was received shortly after the highly praised (and sold out) third concert of that year, Rach^{2}. The cost problems, and the 'tough' financial 'balancing act', however, were not alleviated due to the money being held in trust for the orchestra by the National Arts Council. Its landmark performance of Gustav Mahler's Second Symphony in its second year of existence was considered to be "one that marked a definitive coming of age of classical music in Singapore."

The orchestra has also released a recording of its live performance of Gustav Mahler's First Symphony on its own 'OMMLive' Label, it received a rating of 4 1/2 stars (out of five) by the Straits Times, and was lauded for "homogeneous unity in string passages, lovingly crafted woodwind solos and a brass section any orchestra should be proud of".

The subsequent release of its ground-breaking performance of Gustav Mahler's Second Symphony was regarded as "[having] virtually everything going for it: technical perfection, unstinting energy, assured musicians not afraid of dynamic extremes, a percussion section that gives new meaning to the word 'awesome'" and this was also the first recording by a non-professional orchestra to be featured on the Singapore Airlines KrisWorld Entertainment System.

Future releases featuring Holst's The Planets and Mahler's Eighth Symphony are anticipated.

The orchestra is composed of approximately 140 members, most of whom are students in tertiary education, conscripts (as an avocation), and working professionals, and it is led by its music director, conductor Chan Tze Law, who is also an associate director at the Yong Siew Toh Conservatory, National University of Singapore. It was also the first orchestra of its kind in Singapore to introduce a comprehensive leader-mentor system allowing for the tutelage of its musicians by reputable professionals in the industry. The orchestra, in collaboration with the School of the Arts, has also revived the previously dormant Combined Schools String Camp, with its members, leader-mentors and music director contributing to nurture and develop the musical abilities of string musicians in secondary schools.

A focus on philanthropy has also been one of the orchestra's founding principles and defining features, enunciated as a vision to "pursue philanthropy through the medium of music". Nicknamed the "charity" orchestra in the press, its eleemosynary efforts have already benefited Habitat for Humanity, the Straits Times School Pocket Money Fund, and the Children's Cancer Foundation.

In May 2011, the orchestra achieved Institution of Public Character (IPC) status, which allows all donations made to it to be eligible for 250% tax-exemption.

== Awards and critical reception ==
The critical reception of the new orchestra by the press was warm and largely positive. A Straits Times review of the August 2008 HSBC concert praised the orchestra for its "instrumental prowess" and "infectious zeal", as well as for having a "unanimity of purpose" in its performance of Dvořák's Carnival Overture. A separate critical article in the January 2009 concert commended the orchestra's interpretation of Rimsky-Korsakov's Scheherazade as "impressive", and also remarked on the quality of its soloists:

The pace also flexed ever so supplely, allowing wonderful solos by guest concertmaster Chan Yoong Han (violin) and Laura Peh (harp) – depicting the seductive storyteller – to shine through.

— Chang Tou Liang, "New Orchestra Living its Dream", The Straits Times, 5 January 2009

The maturing orchestra's stature has been further confirmed by its receipt of the 2009 HSBC Youth Excellence Award, an honor created to recognize and support 'outstanding young Singaporeans' and 'serve as a catalyst to promote the pursuit of excellence'. The HSBC Awards Ceremony Gala concert in which the orchestra performed next was noted for its high level of technical precision by a reviewer from the Times, the national newspaper: '[a]gain, it was the precision of execution and sheer passion that impressed.' Concurrently, Chwee Seng Lim, a director at the National Arts Council of Singapore, has also approbated the orchestra for having "plug[ged] the leakage of music talent by providing a platform to sustain the passion of young musicians", demonstrating its success in achieving one of its major goals.

More recently, continuing a trend of critically acclaimed performances of Mahler's symphonies, the performance of the 5th Symphony was regarded as "being characterised by force of will and an overall sweep that was totally captivating" and "a totally absorbing and at times electrifying performance...the famous Adagietto floated along ethereally, completely devoid of excess pathos...and among the more memorable live performances I have attended in my time have been those from Horenstein and Bernstein, neither of which, I can honestly say, quite matched what Chan produced with his dedicated bunch of amateurs."

The orchestra's debut CD release of Mahler's 1st Symphony was praised in the international press,

With somewhere around a hundred recordings of Mahler’s First Symphony on the market ...this Mahler First can stand up to nearly any of them in brilliance, enthusiasm, and sheer visceral excitement.

...One senses this is going to be a performance worthy of attention right from the opening bar, played truly softly (seldom the case in other performances). The first three movements are very well done, but it is the finale that really glows with excellence, unfolding in a seamless arc of controlled intensity. Seldom have I heard an orchestra tear into that finale with the fierce determination of the OMM. It truly roars and rages, yet also brings all the consoling sweetness and tenderness one could wish for in the ensuing Sehr gesangvoll passage.

...Singaporean conductor Tze Law Chan obviously has the pulse of the Mahler idiom and is fully in control at all times, demanding and obtaining from his forces every sforzando, dynamic bulge, and subito forte and piano. One would need to search hard to find an orchestra that gives more.

— Robert Markow, Review of Mahler Symphony No. 1, Tze Law Chan, cond; Orchestra of the Music Makers, OMM Live!, Fanfare Issue 34:2 (November/December 2010)]]

Furthermore, its landmark release of Mahler's 2nd Symphony garnered the following comments,

The very first bars serve notice that this is going to be a performance radiating fierce energy and laser-like intensity. Those opening salvos from the cellos and basses, tossed off with technical bravado, strike a note of sheer terror that does not abate until the sublime second theme arrives. Throughout, conductor Chan paces the climaxes so adroitly that, when they arrive, the listener is nearly swept out of the room on tidal waves of sound. The percussion section, though never out of control, is so powerful that I can recall no other, even from the greatest orchestras, that makes a more magnificent contribution to this symphony. Never, in half a century listening to dozens of performances of this work, have I heard that long, agonizing crescendo from the percussion in the finale build to such a deafening roar.

...there is nothing to suggest that OMM is not a full-time professional orchestra. Ensemble is tight, balances are well judged, rhythms are precise.

This “Resurrection” can stack up to any other on disc you care to name. It has virtually everything going for it: technical perfection, unstinting energy, assured musicians not afraid of dynamic extremes, a percussion section that gives new meaning to the word “awesome,” a conductor with the full measure of the Mahlerian idiom securely in hand and, above all, the thrill of a live performance brought vividly to life.

— Robert Markow, Review of Mahler Symphony No. 2, Tze Law Chan, cond; Orchestra of the Music Makers, OMM Live!, Fanfare, Issue 34:5 (May/June 2011)]]
