= Borodin Quartet =

String quartet

- Origin: Moscow, USSR
- Genres: Classical
- Occupation: Chamber ensemble
- Years active: 1944–present
- Members: Nikolai Sachenko (1st violin); Sergey Lomovsky (2nd violin); Igor Naidin (viola); Vladimir Balshin (cello)
- Past members: Rostislav Dubinsky (1st violin, 1945–1975); Mikhail Kopelman (1st violin, 1976–1996); Ruben Aharonian (1st violin, 1996-2022); Vladimir Rabei (2nd violin, 1945–1947); Nina Barshai (2nd violin, 1947–1953); Yaroslav Alexandrov (2nd violin, 1953–1974); Andrei Abramenkov (2nd violin, 1974–2011); Yuri Nikolaevsky (viola, 1945–1946); Rudolf Barshai (viola, 1946–1953); Dmitri Shebalin (viola, 1953–1996); Mstislav Rostropovich (cello, 1945); Valentin Berlinsky (cello, 1945–2007)

The Borodin Quartet is a string quartet that was founded in 1944 in the then Soviet Union. It is one of the world's longest-lasting string quartets, having marked its 70th-anniversary season in 2015.

The quartet was one of the Soviet Union's best known in the West during the Cold War era, through recordings as well as concert performances in the United States and Europe.

The quartet had a close relationship with composer Dmitri Shostakovich, who personally consulted them on each of his quartets. They also performed with the pianist Sviatoslav Richter on many occasions. They have recorded all of Shostakovich's string quartets as well as all of Beethoven's quartets. Their other recordings include works by a wide range of composers on the Melodiya, Teldec, Virgin Records, and Chandos Records labels.

The original Borodin quartet's sound was characterised by an almost symphonic volume and a highly developed ability to phrase while maintaining group cohesion. Although it has seen many personnel changes in its lifespan, all quartet members have been graduates of the Moscow Conservatory.

== History ==
The quartet was formed as the Moscow Conservatoire Quartet with Mstislav Rostropovich on cello, Rostislav Dubinsky and Vladimir Rabei on first and second violins, and Yuri Nikolaevsky on viola, all studying with professor Mikhail Terian, the viola player of the Komitas Quartet (chamber ensemble class). Rostropovich withdrew after a few weeks in favour of Valentin Berlinsky. Vladimir Rabei and Yuri Nikolaevsky were soon succeeded by Nina Barshai and Rudolf Barshai.

The quartet first met Shostakovich in 1946 and became an interpreter of his compositions. In due course they became known for their performances of all of Shostakovich's quartets (eventually numbering 15) at concert halls around the world.

As one of the most revered groups during the Communist era, the quartet performed at the funerals of both Joseph Stalin and Sergei Prokofiev, who died on the same day in 1953.

In 1955 the quartet was renamed after Alexander Borodin, one of the founders of Russian chamber music.

In the Soviet era their concert engagements and repertoire were directed by the state concert organisation Gosconcert on the basis of maximum revenue. This irked the performers and Western concert organisers.

After 20 years with the same lineup, difficult times followed in the 1970s: Dubinsky defected to the West, and second violinist Yaroslav Alexandrov retired due to ill health. Having recruited replacements, Berlinsky insisted that the ensemble spend two years out of public attention until the Borodin sound had been fully recreated.

In his 1989 book Stormy Applause, Dubinsky chronicled disharmony, power struggles and betrayal to the authorities by Berlinsky, who admitted being a Communist Party member. Berlinsky, for his part, dismissed the book as “full of half truths”. Dubinsky formed the Borodin Trio in 1976.

== Discography ==
=== Studio albums ===
Year	Album details
2005	Beethoven: String Quartets, Vol. 4: Release date: 10 January 2005; Label: Chandos Records
2007	Galynin, Prokofiev, Shostakovich: Russian Chamber Works of XX c.: Release date: 14 May 2007; Label: Melodiya
2015	Tchaikovsky: String Quartet No. 2; Sextet "Souvenir de Florence": Release date: 24 July 2015; Label: Alto
