= Sheku Kanneh-Mason =

British cellist (born 1999)

Sheku Kanneh-Mason MBE
- Born: 4 April 1999 (age 27)
- Origin: Bahrain and Nottingham, England
- Genre: Classical
- Instrument: Cello
- Years active: 2015–present
- Label: Decca Classics
- Website: shekukannehmason.com

Sheku Kanneh-Mason MBE (born 4 April 1999) is a British cellist who won the 2016 BBC Young Musician award. He was the first black musician to win the competition since its launch in 1978. He played at the wedding of Prince Harry to Meghan Markle on 19 May 2018 under the direction of Christopher Warren-Green. Also performing at the wedding was the traditional choir of St. George's Chapel led by James Vivian and gospel performers the Kingdom Choir, conducted by Karen Gibson. As of 2021, Kanneh-Mason plays a Matteo Goffriller cello that was made in 1700.

== Early life and education ==
Kanneh-Mason was born in Bahrain and grew up in Nottingham, England. He was born to Stuart Mason, from London, a luxury hotel business manager of Antiguan descent, and Dr. Kadiatu Kanneh, from Sierra Leone, a former lecturer in the University of Birmingham and author of the 2020 book House of Music: Raising the Kanneh-Masons.

The third of seven children, he began learning the cello at the age of six with Sarah Huson-Whyte, having briefly played the violin. His love for the cello started when he saw his sister perform in 'Stringwise', an annual weekend course for young Nottingham string players, run by the local music charity Music for Everyone. He then switched from violin to cello and went on to take part in Music for Everyone's Stringwise courses, impressing their conductors with his ability to play everything from memory. At the age of nine, he passed Grade 8 cello examination with the highest marks in the UK, and won the Marguerite Swan Memorial Prize. Also aged nine he won an ABRSM junior scholarship to join the Junior Academy of the Royal Academy of Music, where he was tutored by Ben Davies.

Kanneh-Mason received his non-specialist education as a pupil at the Trinity School, Nottingham, where he studied for A-levels in Music, Mathematics and Physics. He was a student of Hannah Roberts at the Royal Academy of Music in London. He has cited cellists Jacqueline du Pré and Mstislav Rostropovich as his "musical heroes", alongside Bob Marley. He also listens to jazz, hip-hop from the 1990s and early 2000s, and Brazilian music.

== Career ==
In 2015, he and his siblings were competitors on Britain's Got Talent as The Kanneh-Masons. He won the BBC's Young Musician of the Year contest in May 2016, later telling The Observer that appearing on Britain's Got Talent had been "a good experience for getting used to performing in front of lots of people, with cameras and interviews. When it came to BBC Young Musician there were fewer cameras so I wasn't fazed at all."

In June 2016, Kanneh-Mason signed a deal for worldwide general management with the London-based boutique agency Enticott Music Management, and went on to sign a major recording contract with the classical music label Decca Classics in November 2016. The record deal was signed on board a Nottingham City Transport bus which the local authority had named in his honour after Kanneh-Mason won the BBC Young Musician contest. The label announced that his first recording would feature the piece with which he won the BBC's Young Musician of the Year contest, Shostakovich's Cello Concerto No.1.

Kanneh-Mason was a member of the Chineke! Orchestra, which was founded by Chi-chi Nwanoku for black and minority ethnic classical musicians; his sister Isata Kanneh-Mason and brother Braimah are also members. In 2016, Kanneh-Mason told The Guardian's Tom Service that:

Chineke! is a really inspiring project. I rarely go to a concert and see that kind of diversity in the orchestra. Or in the audience. Having the orchestra will definitely change the culture. It's so important we're celebrating music by black composers, too, like the piece by Chevalier de Saint-Georges we're playing in September.

In November 2016, Kanneh-Mason was the subject of a BBC Four documentary entitled Young, Gifted and Classical: The Making of a Maestro. The following month, he was interviewed for BBC Radio 4's Front Row round-up of the year's major arts and entertainment award winners.

Kanneh-Mason performed at the 2017 British Academy Film Awards (BAFTA) held in London's Royal Albert Hall. In the same year, he was the soloist for the Chineke! orchestra's performance at the BBC Proms, playing Antonín Dvořák's Rondo in G minor.

In January 2018, it was reported that Kanneh-Mason had donated £3,000 to his former secondary school, enabling ten other pupils to continue their cello lessons.

In early February 2018, the BBC reported that Kanneh-Mason's album Inspiration was "the biggest-selling British debut of the year to date", entering the UK Albums Chart at number 18, had become number one on the UK classical albums chart, and had achieved 2.5 million streams on Spotify.

Also in February 2018 Kanneh-Mason became the first artist ever to be re-invited to perform a second time at the British Academy Film Awards, playing "Evening of Roses" by Yosef Hadar in an arrangement by Tom Hodge. For his second BAFTA performance, Kanneh-Mason was joined on stage at the Royal Albert Hall by his siblings Isata, Braimah, Konya, and Jeneba.

On 19 May 2018, Kanneh-Mason performed as part of the musical selections for the wedding of Prince Harry and Meghan Markle. On 11 November 2018, he performed in the presence of the same couple at the Royal Variety Performance which was broadcast on ITV.

With his second album Elgar (2020), he became what the BBC call "the first cellist ever to reach the Top 10 of the UK album chart". The record reached number eight, and with it he also became "the first classical musician to break into the top 10 of the album charts in over 30 years", with violinist/violist Nigel Kennedy's 1989 top three album being the last record by a classical instrumentalist to achieve such a level of British success.

On 26 May 2022, the Royal Academy of Music announced that Kanneh-Mason had been appointed as its first Menuhin Visiting Professor of Performance Mentoring.

After having to postpone a tour to Australia in 2020 and 2021, the whole family toured six Australian cities over 16 days in July/August 2022, including a performance with the Melbourne Symphony Orchestra of Shostakovich's Cello Concerto No. 2 and a wide variety of compositions by Frank Bridge, George Gershwin, Felix Mendelssohn, Maria Theresia von Paradis, Eric Whitacre, Franz Schubert, Samuel Coleridge-Taylor, Franz Liszt, Jerry Bock (Fiddler on the Roof), and Bob Marley ("Redemption Song").

On 9 September 2023, Kanneh-Mason was the instrumental soloist at the Last Night of the Proms, performing alongside soprano Lise Davidsen, and conducted by Marin Alsop.

Kanneh-Mason has lent his support to the organisation Black Lives in Music.

On 21 January 2024, he was a guest on BBC Radio 4's Desert Island Discs. When asked whether "Rule, Britannia!" should be played at the Last Night of the Proms, he replied it should not because it "makes a lot of people feel uncomfortable".

Chronicling his experiences, he published his book The Power of Music in 2025.

Kanneh-Mason was the guest in the episode, broadcast on 1 May 2025, of the BBC Radio 4 programme This Cultural Life, in which guests talk about their formative cultural influences.

In November 2025, Kanneh-Mason was forced to cancel concerts and appearances for late 2025 and early 2026 due to an injury he sustained on a finger on his left hand.

== Honours and awards ==
Kanneh-Mason was the winner of the 2016 BBC Young Musician competition, following which his home town of Nottingham named a bus in his honour. In that year he also won the Royal Philharmonic Society Young Instrumentalist Duet Prize.

In June 2017, he won the Classical category of the South Bank Sky Arts Award The Times Breakthrough prize.

In June 2018, he won both the Male Artist of the Year and the Critics' Choice Award at the Classic BRIT Awards.

Kanneh-Mason was appointed Member of the Order of the British Empire (MBE) in the 2020 New Year Honours for services to music.

In March 2020, Kanneh-Mason won the public vote for Best Classical Artist at the Global Awards.

== Charitable work ==
Kanneh-Mason was diagnosed with Type 1 diabetes at the age of 12. In September 2018, the Juvenile Diabetes Research Foundation (JDRF) announced that it had appointed him as a global ambassador. He is also an ambassador for the charities Music Masters and Future Talent.

== Discography ==
Kanneh-Mason released his debut EP in February 2017 to coincide with his performance at the BAFTAs. The three tracks on the EP were recorded at the Abbey Road Studios.

- Pablo Casals, "Song of the Birds", acc. Isata Kanneh-Mason
- Ernest Bloch, "Abodah", arr. Sheku Kanneh-Mason
- Gabriel Fauré, "Après un rêve"

These tracks followed the viral success of his video of Leonard Cohen's "Hallelujah", arranged by Tom Hodge. Kanneh-Mason performed this arrangement at the BAFTAs in February 2017. He has also recorded Gaspar Cassadó's "Requiebros".

Kanneh-Mason appears as a guest artist on the album Tecchler's Cello: from Cambridge to Rome by cellist and fellow BBC Young Musician winner Guy Johnston, released in September 2017.

On 26 January 2018 Kanneh-Mason's first full-length album, Inspiration, was released by Decca. The recording includes the Shostakovich Cello Concerto No. 1 (accompanied by the CBSO conducted by Mirga Gražinytė-Tyla) as well as shorter works by Shostakovich, Saint-Saëns, Offenbach, Casals and Kanneh-Mason's own arrangement of Bob Marley's "No Woman, No Cry". On 2 February 2018, the Official UK Charts Company announced that Inspiration's success had made Kanneh-Mason "the UK's youngest cellist to break into the Official Albums Chart Top 20 with his debut album" (the previous holder of the accolade being cellist Julian Lloyd Webber, who was 39 when he released Lloyd Webber Plays Lloyd Webber in 1990). As well as being the highest-charting BBC Young Musician on the UK's Official Albums Chart, Kanneh-Mason is also the first BBC Young Musician to break into the albums Top 40 with their debut record.

Kanneh-Mason's second album Elgar was released by Decca Classics on 10 January 2020. It features a recording of the Elgar Cello Concerto in E minor, Op. 85, with the London Symphony Orchestra conducted by Sir Simon Rattle. The album also includes arrangements of traditional melodies, along with works by Bloch, Bridge, Elgar, Fauré, and Julius Klengel.

Kanneh-Mason and his sister Isata together released the album Muse in November 2021. It features Samuel Barber's Sonata for Cello and Piano, transcriptions of songs by Barber and Rachmaninov, and Rachmaninov's Cello Sonata.

Kanneh-Mason's most recent album Hope in Shadow was released on 13 November 2026. It features The Swan from The Carnival of the Animals by Camille Saint-Saëns.

=== Albums ===
Title	Details	Peak chart positions	
Title	Details	UK	AUS
Inspiration	Released: 26 January 2018; Label: Decca Classics	11	—
Elgar	Released: 10 January 2020; Label: Decca Classics	8	61
Muse	Released: 5 November 2021; Label: Decca Classics	—	—
Song	Released: 9 September 2022; Label: Decca Classics	—	—
Shostakovich & Britten	Released: 9 May 2025; Label: Decca Classics	—	—
Hope in Shadow	Released: 13 November 2026; Label: Decca Classics	—	—
