= London Schools Symphony Orchestra =

The London Schools Symphony Orchestra (LSSO) is a youth orchestra whose members are young musicians living or studying in London. The students rehearse and perform with professional conductors and soloists. The LSSO was founded in 1951 by Dr Leslie Russell, Senior Music Inspector for the London County Council. From 1965 to 1990 it was part of the Inner London Education Authority’s (ILEA) music provision and since 1990 has been managed by the Centre for Young Musicians, which in turn is now a part of Guildhall Young Artists, the Guildhall School of Music and Drama under 18 division. The LSSO is considered to be London's premier youth orchestra, giving three concerts annually in the Barbican Centre. Concerts are preceded by intense rehearsal periods during the school holidays. The summer course in July is usually followed by a tour in the UK or abroad with destinations having included Japan, the USA, Argentina, Romania, Czech Republic, Sweden, Germany Spain and Turkey. In the 70+ years of its life the LSSO has been associated with numerous outstanding conductors, composers and soloists, including Sir Simon Rattle, Sir Charles Mackerras, Sir Colin Davis, Sir Malcolm Arnold, Sir George Benjamin, Sir Andrew Davis, Steuart Bedford, Gyorgy Sandor, Myung-Wha Chung, Dudley Moore. More recently in addition to Peter Ash (Artistic Director 2001-2021) guest conductors have included Sian Edwards, Edward Gardner, Christopher Warren-Green, Nicholas Kraemer, Ryan Wigglesworth, Timothy Redmond and Dominic Wheeler, along with soloists such as Lawrence Power, Leia Zhu, Pacho Flores, Louise Hopkins and Matthew Sharp. The LSSO has given several world premieres, including works by composers who are former members of the orchestra, and collaborated with prominent arts organisations in London. In 2022 the orchestra launched a Conductor in-Residence Scheme in association with Black Lives In Music to assist emerging conductors. The current Conductor-In-Residence for the 2024-25 season is Ammal Bhatia, succeeding Enyi Okpara, and previously Bradley Wilson. As well as playing in professional orchestras former members of the LSSO can now be found, conducting, composing, teaching and performing in a range of genres all over the world and over many generations.

== See also ==
- List of youth orchestras
