= Hiawatha Coleridge-Taylor =

English conductor, music publisher and doctor (1900–1980)

Hiawatha Bryan Coleridge-Taylor (15 October 1900 – 20 January 1980) was an English conductor, music publisher and doctor, the son of the composer Samuel Coleridge Taylor. Born in Croydon, he was named after the Longfellow poem that his father set as The Song of Hiawatha between 1898 and 1900, which had made him globally famous. His younger sister was Avril Coleridge-Taylor. From November 1917 he served as a driver in the French Red Cross at the age of 17. In the 1921 census he was listed as a music student. In December 1925 he married the pianist (Sarah) Kathleen Markwell (1896–1973). She had been his accompanist. In the late 1930s they were living at Rodmell in East Sussex, where a neighbour was the sculptor Marjorie Drawbell.

Hiawatha adapted, edited and conducted the ballet music for the 1924 epic staging of The Song of Hiawatha at the Royal Albert Hall on 19 May 1924, as produced by impresario T. C. Fairbairn. These epic stagings were highly popular, and continued on an annual basis until 1939.

In 1938 Hiawatha took legal action against his father's publisher Novello in a bid to secure unpaid royalties generated by his father's music. He won the case, but Novello appealed and the verdict was overturned. The 1939 Census lists Hiawatha's occupation as copyright music agent.

He later worked as a general practitioner in the Wimbledon area, where he lived next door to St Mary's Church. There is a commemorative bench in the churchyard. He died in Merton, aged 79.
