= Staatsoper Stuttgart =

Opera house in Stuttgart, Germany

Staatsoper Stuttgart Stuttgart State Opera
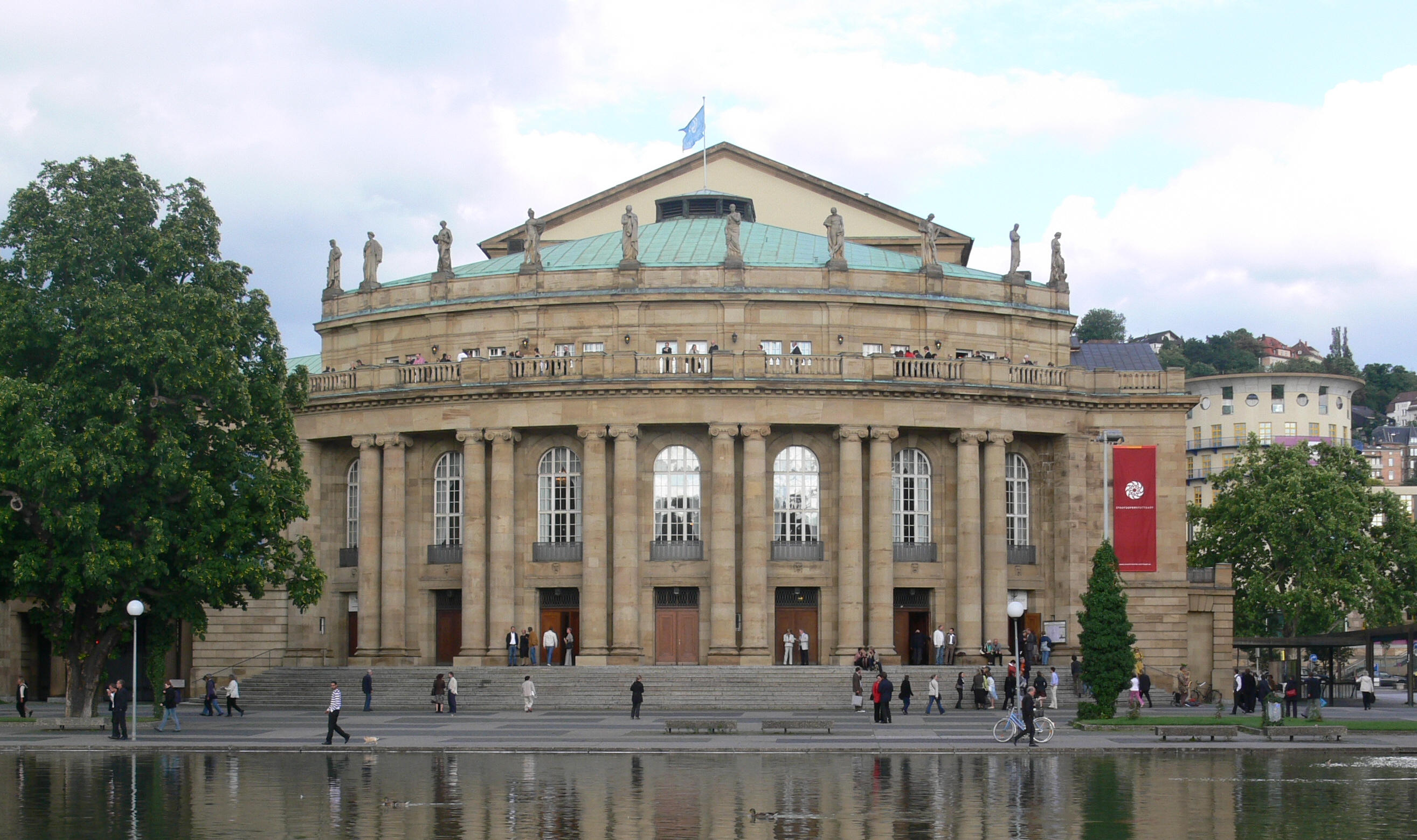
- Opera House of Staatstheater Stuttgart
- Interactive map of Staatsoper Stuttgart; Stuttgart State Opera
- Former names: Königliche Hofoper Stuttgart
- Address: Stuttgart, Baden-Württemberg; Germany
- Coordinates: 48°46′49″N 9°11′06″E
- Capacity: 1404
- Type: Opera house

Construction
- Opened: 1912
- Architect: Max Littmann

Website
- www.staatsoper-stuttgart.de

The Staatsoper Stuttgart (Stuttgart State Opera) is a German opera company based in Stuttgart, the capital of Baden-Württemberg, Germany. The Staatsorchester Stuttgart serves as its resident orchestra.

== History ==
Performances of operas, ballet and plays in Stuttgart took place from the 17th century at the hall of Neues Lusthaus. The probably first opera production was in 1660 the singspiel Der Raub der Proserpina by Hofkapellmeister Samuel Capricornus. Four years later, a permanent stage was established. In 1750, the building was remodeled as Stuttgart's opera house, named Königliches Hoftheater (Royal Court Theatre) in 1811. It burnt down in 1902, and opera was performed in a provisional Interimstheater.

Today's opera house was built from 1909 to 1912 by architect Max Littmann from Munich, with two halls, Großes Haus and Kleines Haus. After the end of the monarchy in 1918, the theatres were named Württembergische Landestheater. The Kleines Haus, site of the world premiere of the first version of Ariadne auf Naxos by Richard Strauss, was destroyed in World War II.

Staatsoper Stuttgart forms part of the Staatstheater Stuttgart, a three-branch theatre organisation for opera, play and Stuttgart Ballet. The house, which has been a listed building since 1924, currently has 1,404 seats and a per-season audience of approximately 250,000. An important centre for opera since the 17th century, Stuttgart has again become an important and influential centre since the war, particularly for contemporary works. Three operas by Carl Orff received their premieres there and the company has been associated with figures such as Wieland Wagner, Günther Rennert, Hans Werner Henze and Philip Glass.

=== Klaus Zehelein era (1991–2006) ===
During the era of Opera Intendant Klaus Zehelein, the company has won the Opera House of the Year award by the German magazine Opernwelt more often than any other company: in 1994 (the inaugural award), 1998, 1999, 2000, 2002 and in 2006. Pamela Rosenberg was co-opera Intendantin between 1991 and 2000, with Eytan Pessen acting as casting director from 2001 to 2006. Klaus Zehelein brought in directors Ruth Berghaus, Christof Nel, Hans Neuenfels, Peter Konwitschny and Jossi Wieler. He created the Junge Oper, dedicated to performing music theatre works for young audiences. Numerous CD and DVD productions document Zehelein's interest in modern works and new staging concepts. Under Zehelein's direction, the Stuttgart Opera was an ensemble-based opera company, with Catherine Naglestad, Tichina Vaughn, Eva-Maria Westbroek were members of his ensemble, and Jonas Kaufmann a frequent guest artist. GMDs of the company were Gabriele Ferro (1992–1997) and Lothar Zagrosek (1997–2006). Albrecht Puhlmann succeeded Zehelein as the company's Intendant.

=== Present ===
Manfred Honeck was Generalmusikdirektor (GMD) from 2007 to 2011. Jossi Wieler was Intendant (artistic director) of the company from 2011 until 2018, succeeding Albrecht Puhlmann. In April 2010, Wieler appointed Sylvain Cambreling as Generalmusikdirektor (GMD) of the company, effective with the 2012–2013 season. Wieler and Cambreling each stood down from their respective posts with the company in 2018.

Since 2018, Viktor Schoner is Intendant of the company. Cornelius Meister became GMD of the company also in 2018. In October 2022, the company announced the extension of Meister's contract as GMD through 2026. In April 2024, Meister announced that he is to stand down as GMD in Stuttgart at the close of his current contract in 2026. In November 2024, the company announced the appointment of Nicholas Carter as its next GMD, effective with the 2026–2027 season.

== General Music Directors ==
- Max von Schillings (1908–1918) (Hofopernorchester)
- Fritz Busch (1918–1922) (Landestheaterorchester)
- Carl Leonhardt (1922–1937) (partly Landestheaterorchester)
- Herbert Albert (1937–1942)
- Ferdinand Leitner (1947–1969)
- Václav Neumann (1970–1972)
- Silvio Varviso (1972–1980)
- Dennis Russell Davies (1980–1987)
- Luis Antonio García Navarro (1987–1991)
- Gabriele Ferro (1992–1997)
- Lothar Zagrosek (1997–2006)
- Manfred Honeck (2007–2011)
- Sylvain Cambreling (2012–2018)
- Cornelius Meister (2018–present)
- Nicholas Carter (from 2026)

== Selected discography ==
Stuttgart CD productions:

- Philip Glass: Akhnaten (1987)
- Luigi Nono:
  - Intolleranza 1960 (1995)
  - Al gran sole carico d'amore (2001)
- Helmut Lachenmann: Das Mädchen mit den Schwefelhölzern (2003)

Stuttgart productions on DVD:

- Philip Glass: Satyagraha (1983)
- Handel: Alcina (1999)
- Karl Amadeus Hartmann: Simplicius Simplicissimus (2005)
- Mozart: La finta giardiniera [2006)
- Wagner: Der Ring des Nibelungen (2003)
- Bernd Alois Zimmermann: Die Soldaten (1989)
