= Black Lives in Music =

Anti-discriminatory musical organisation

Black Lives in Music (BLIM), founded in the UK in 2020, and launched in the UK in 2021, works for equal opportunities for Black, Asian and ethnically diverse people in the jazz and classical music industry, opportunities that include the chance to learn a musical instrument, attend a music school, pursue a career in music and reach senior levels within the sector without facing discrimination.

== Founders ==
Charisse Beaumont, Chief Executive and Women in Music Roll of Honour 2022, and Roger Wilson, Director of Operations, are co-founders.

== Activities ==
BLIM have recorded a five-part digital video series of one-to-one conversations with well-known figures in the music industry such as Paulette Long, OBE and Sheku Kanneh-Mason who was a member of the Chineke! Orchestra, founded by Chi-chi Nwanoku to give opportunities to black and minority ethnic classical musicians as well as to perform pieces by neglected black composers.

BLIM has set up "BLIM Connect", a mentoring scheme designed to support young musicians as, for example, they prepare for conservatoire auditions.

Data on diversity in the music industry exists, such as that only 2% of teachers at conservatoires are from diverse backgrounds. In 2021, however, BLIM published the report of a survey of over 1,700 respondents, entitled "Being Black in the Music Industry". Black professionals in the music industry were encouraged to take part by Dr Kadie Kanneh-Mason so that data could be contributed on how black people experience working in the UK music industry and on the obstacles they face. A large proportion of the black music professionals surveyed stated that they had faced bullying, harassment, micro aggressions and other forms of racism. Many, especially women, believed that their mental health had deteriorated as a result. Key findings highlighted the gender pay disparity, and the pressure on Black women in the music industry to change their behaviour, voice, and appearance to fit in with white expectations. The report can be downloaded from the BLIM web site.

In 2022, Charisse Beaumont gave evidence on behalf of BLIM to the "Misogyny in Music" enquiry of the House of Commons Women and Equalities Select Committee highlighting the gender pay gap between black women and white women and men in the music industry. The session was recorded and can be viewed.

Coinciding with Black History Month in the UK, The Independent newspaper granted free advertising to BLIM.

In 2023, BLIM set up a voluntary UK Music Industry Anti-Racism Code of Conduct designed to tackle lack of employment opportunities, and low pay. The code is backed by the Independent Parliamentary Standards Authority and is supported by several record labels. BLIM hopes to publish an annual report detailing which organisations have done well in terms of the code.

In 2023, BLIM presented research and advocacy work to the House of Commons All-Party Parliamentary Group on Music asking for government action on the Gender and Ethnic pay gap in the music industry.

In 2024 and 2025, BLIM ran 'Classically Black' a one day symposium sponsored by the Associated Board of the Royal Schools of Music (ABRSM). The event commemorated and celebrated the contribution of Black and global majority musicians to classical music.

== Partners ==
BLIM is building partnerships with music departments, conservatoires and others within the UK music industry, examples of these are:

The Musicians Union

Attitude is Everything

British and Irish Modern Music Institute (BIMM)

Trinity Laban
