= Hannah Roberts (cellist) =

British cellist

Hannah Roberts is a British cellist. She performs as a duo with her husband, pianist and composer Simon Parkin, and is also a soloist, chamber musician, principal cellist and teacher. She is currently principal cello of the chamber orchestra Manchester Camerata.

== Teaching ==
Roberts is a cello professor and Fellow at the Royal Northern College of Music in Manchester, and also teaches at the Royal Academy of Music in London. She has taught young cellists including Sheku Kanneh-Mason.
