= Avril Coleridge-Taylor =

British musician and composer (1903–1998)

- Avril Coleridge-Taylor
- Born: Gwendolen Avril Coleridge-Taylor; 8 March 1903; South Norwood, Surrey, England
- Died: 21 December 1998 (aged 95); Seaford, East Sussex, England
- Education: Trinity College of Music
- Spouse(s): Harold Dashwood, m. 1924, div.
- Parent(s): Jessie (née Walmisley) and Samuel Coleridge-Taylor
- Writing career
- Pen name: Peter Riley

Gwendolen Avril Coleridge-Taylor (8 March 1903 – 21 December 1998) was an English pianist, conductor, and composer. She was the daughter of composer Samuel Coleridge-Taylor and his wife Jessie (née Walmisley).

== Personal life ==
Gwendolen Avril Coleridge-Taylor was born in South Norwood, London, the daughter of composer Samuel Coleridge-Taylor and his wife Jessie Walmisley, who had met as students at the Royal College of Music. She had an older brother, Hiawatha.

On 19 April 1924, Coleridge-Taylor married Harold Dashwood, in the Croydon parish church. She initially composed and conducted using her first name and maiden surname. After their divorce she dropped her first name, thereafter going as Avril Coleridge-Taylor professionally. In the 1930s she was living at The Studio, 4A Hill Road in St John's Wood.

Coleridge-Taylor was invited on a tour of South Africa in 1952, during the period of apartheid, arriving on the inaugural flight of de Havilland's Comet passenger jet from Croydon to Johannesburg. Originally she was supportive of, or neutral to the South African apartheid system; she was taken as White and was mostly White-European in ancestry. When the South African government learned that her father was not White (being bi-racial, he would have been considered Coloured under its system), it denied her work as a conductor and composer.

In 1939, she moved to Buxted in East Sussex, where she had views over the South Downs. Coleridge-Taylor died in Seaford on the Sussex coast in late 1998. In 1998 a blue plaque was placed at the nursing home where she spent her last days, Stone's House, Crouch Lane, Seaford.

== Career in music ==
Coleridge-Taylor wrote her first composition, "Goodbye Butterfly", at the age of 12. Later, she won a scholarship for composition and piano at Trinity College of Music in 1915, where she was taught orchestration and composition by Gordon Jacob and Alec Rowley, and conducting by Henry Wood, Ernest Read and Albert Coates.

In 1933, she made her formal debut as a conductor at the Royal Albert Hall. She was the first female conductor of H.M. Royal Marines and a frequent guest conductor of the BBC Symphony Orchestra and the London Symphony Orchestra. In 1938, she was the first female conductor to conduct at the bandstand in London's Hyde Park. She was the founder and conductor of both the Coleridge-Taylor Symphony Orchestra and its accompanying musical society in 1941, intended to give employment to musicians during the depression. The orchestra at its peak consisted of more than 100 musicians made up of 70 professionals and 30 "specially selected" amateur string players, and a choir of 70 voices. She also founded the Malcolm Sargent Symphony Orchestra and the New World Singers.

In 1956, Coleridge-Taylor arranged and conducted the spirituals performed in a BBC radio version of Marc Connelly's 1930 play The Green Pastures. In 1957, she wrote her Ceremonial March for Ghana's independence day celebrations, also attended by Martin Luther King.

She also published compositions under the pseudonym Peter Riley.

In later life she wrote a biography of her composer father, The Heritage of Samuel Coleridge-Taylor (London: Dobson, 1979). The book details her own life and memories of her father.

== Music ==
Her compositions include large-scale orchestral works, as well as songs, keyboard, and chamber music. Her first orchestral work, To April (1929), also marked her first appearance as a conductor when it was performed two years later. There followed the suite Spring Magic (1933), the 12-minute tone poem Sussex Landscape, Op. 27 (1936), a Piano Concerto in F minor (1938), From the Hills, In Memoriam R.A.F., and the Golden Wedding Ballet Suite. Wyndore (Windover) and The Elfin Artist, are both for choir and orchestra. Historical Episode (1941), one of her largest works, is a symphonic impression of war-time events and experiences.

There are signs of a revival in interest in her work in the 21st century. The manuscript of the Impromptu in A minor, Romance de pan, first performed in 1922, was rediscovered in the Royal College of Music Library collection and performed in Brighton in 2018. Sussex Landscape was played in 2019 by the Chineke! Orchestra at a Queen Elizabeth Hall concert on 22 April 2019, with a repeat at the Royal Festival Hall in October 2020. It has since been recorded and was performed at the BBC Proms in 2024. Wyndore, composed in Alfriston in 1936 and inspired by an Aldous Huxley poem ("I have tuned my music to the trees"), is a seven-minute song without words. The first performance was organised by the Birkenhead Philharmonic Society on 16 February 1937, conducted by Coleridge-Taylor. The Royal Philharmonic Concert Orchestra gave its first UK performance for 82 years on 7 March 2020 at Boxgrove Priory, West Sussex.

In 2022 her descendants, the Dashwood family, told the BBC about their rediscovery of archive material. The new material adds around fifty additional compositions to the composer's previously known works. Other manuscripts are held at the Royal College of Music. In 2025 Resonus Classics released the first full CD of her music, including the Piano Concerto, the Comet Prelude, From the Hills, Sussex Landscape and other orchestral works.

== Works ==
=== Chamber music ===
- Rêverie for cello and piano, Op. 26
- Idylle for flute and piano, Op. 21
- Impromptu for flute and piano, Op. 33
- A Lament for flute and piano, Op. 31
- Crépuscule d’une nuit d’éte for flute and piano
- Romance for violin and piano, Op. 176
- Fantasie pastorale for flute and piano
- Fantasie for violin and piano
- Warum? for koto and piano

=== Keyboard music ===
- Interlude
- To H.C.D.
- Valse
- Caprice
- Liebeslied
- Sérènade Romantique Op. 20
- Danse Extatique Op. 24
- Elégie Op. 25
- Un Sonnet d'Amour
- Four Characteristic Waltzes
- Impromptu, Op. 9
- Rhapsody for piano, Op. 174
- Two Short Pieces for Piano: 'Allegro' and 'Lento'
- Just as the Tide was Flowing: Berceuse & Nocturne
- Concert Étude
- Pastorale
- Music for the Red Cross for organ
- All Lovely Things
- Méditations
- The Weeping Flower
- The Garden Pool
- Evening Song
- Wedding March (from The Golden Wedding)
- Threnody for "Brown" (Ada Riddell)
- Nocturne
- Traümerei
- The Snow Goose Suite

=== Orchestral music ===
- Spring Magic: Fairy Ballet Suite (1920)
- To April, poem for orchestra (1933)
- From the Hills (1934)
- Wyndore for choir and orchestra (1936)
- Piano Concerto in F minor (1938)
- Sussex Landscape, (1940) Op. 27
- Suite for String Orchestra
- Historical Episode (1941)
- Symphonic Impression (1942)
- In Memoriam: To the RAF (1945)
- The Peace-Pipe (1949)
- Golden Wedding Ballet Suite
- Comet Prelude (1952)
- Ceremonial March to celebrate Ghana's Independence (1957)
- The Weeping Flower (1964)
- In Memoriam: Largo (1967, rev. 1980)
- Snow Goose Suite
- The Dreaming Water-Lily for voice and orchestra
- The Sea for voice and orchestra

=== Songs ===
- "Goodbye Butterfly", Op. 1
- "Mister Sun", Op. 2
- "Silver Stars", Op. 3
- "Who Knows?", Op. 4
- "April", Op. 5
- "The Dreaming Water Lily", Op. 6
- "The Rustling of Grass", Op. 7 (text: Alfred Noyes)
- "The Entranced Hour", Op. 8
- "Song", Op. 29
- "Nightfall", Op. 43
- "Apple Blossom", Op. 44
- "Sleeping and Waking", Op. 45
