= Centre for Young Musicians =

Coordinates: 51.497878°N 0.109976°W

The Centre for Young Musicians, or CYM, is a specialist Saturday music centre formed in 1970 and based at Morley College in London, England. It offers musical training to students 5 to 18 who play a musical instrument and has seen more than 50,000 students pass through its doors since it first began.

CYM London provides opportunities for students with a special interest in music from absolute beginner to diploma standard. It is currently headed by Bryan Welton and is part of Guildhall School’s network of centres across the country, providing performing arts training for children and young people. CYM employs top practitioners and industry professionals across a variety of styles and genres with accompanists always available for students to practise with prior to concerts and exams.

Extra curricular and lunchtime activities may include master classes with instrumentalists, exam techniques, public performance preparation and departmental concerts.

Departments and Heads:

- Program:Tim Pottier
- Strings: Khac-Uyen Nguyen
- Woodwind and Brass: Julie Beaman
- Percussion: Tony Maloney
- Piano: Cathy Riley
- Guitar: David Parsons
- Singing: Lynda Richardson

CYM also organises the LSSO (London Schools Symphony Orchestra) and its companion ensemble, the LYWB - London Youth Wind Band, formed in 2003, to provide more opportunities for wind, brass and percussion players to work at the high musical levels achieved by the LSSO and to perform in major venues.

Many students are also active with other ensembles and bands such as the London Chinese Children's Ensemble, Kinetika Bloco, Grand Union Orchestra, Tomorrow's Warriors and others.

Former CYM students include:

- Naga Munchetty
- Vashti Hunter
- Guitarist and composer Vincent Lindsey-Clark
- John Lenihan
- Amy Roberts
- Django Bates
- Jonathan Dove
- Violinist and conductor Christopher Warren-Green
- James Jervis. Aquarelle Guitar Quartet
