= Chineke! Orchestra =

British orchestra

Chineke! Orchestra (/ˈtʃɪnɛkeɪ/) is a British orchestra, the first professional orchestra in Europe to be made up of majority Black & ethnically diverse musicians. The word Chineke derives from the Igbo language meaning "God". The orchestra was founded by musician Chi-chi Nwanoku CBE and their debut concert was in 2015 at Queen Elizabeth Hall in London.

== Background ==
Nwanoku, the orchestra's founder, coined its name from the word "Chi" in the Igbo language, which refers to "the god of creation of all good things", or "the spirit of creation". She was inspired by the use of the term in the 1958 novel Things Fall Apart by Nigerian author Chinua Achebe.

Nwanoku has acknowledged that inspiration for founding the orchestra came from a conversation with Ed Vaizey, then the UK Minister of Culture, who noted to her that she was one of the very few musicians of colour on stage in a classical orchestra. She also took inspiration from attending a London concert of the Kinshasa Symphony, from the Democratic Republic of Congo, where the orchestra was all black, but the audience was almost entirely white.

== History ==
The Chineke! Foundation was established in 2015, and its parallel orchestra followed in the same year, with the express purpose of providing "career opportunities to young Black and Minority Ethnic (BAME) classical musicians in the UK and Europe". The ensemble debuted at the Queen Elizabeth Hall, Southbank Centre in London in September 2015, conducted by Wayne Marshall, and highlighting works by Black British composers, such as Samuel Coleridge-Taylor’s Ballade for Orchestra and Elegy: In memoriam – Stephen Lawrence by Philip Herbert. The orchestra for its first two concerts comprised exclusively black, Asian and minority ethnic musicians, but it has since included white musicians. Chineke! became a resident orchestra at the Southbank Centre in 2016. The orchestra made its debut at The Proms in August 2017, conducted by Kevin John Edusei.

In 2017, the orchestra made its first commercial recording for the Signum label, conducted by Edusei.

In November 2019, the Chineke! Foundation became the first-ever recipient of the Royal Philharmonic Society's Gamechanger Award, presented to an individual, group or organisation who in unique and contemporary ways has done inspirational and transformative work breaking new ground in classical music.

Chi-Chi Nwanoku resigned from the orchestra in September, 2026, having been suspended in December, 2024 over "code of conduct" issues.

An organisation with the same purpose as The Chineke! Foundation, and one supported by a member of the orchestra, Sheku Kanneh-Mason, is Black Lives in Music.

== Premieres ==
Chineke! has given world premieres of new works by black composers including:

- James Wilson, The Green Fuse – Pittville Pump Room, Cheltenham, 10 July 2017
- Hannah Kendall, The Spark Catchers – BBC Proms, Royal Albert Hall, London, 30 August 2017
- Daniel Kidane, Dream Song – Queen Elizabeth Hall, London, 9 April 2018
- Julian Joseph, Carry That Sound – Queen Elizabeth Hall, London, 21 July 2018
- Errollyn Wallen, Nnenna – Cambridge Festival, November 2018
- James Wilson, Free-man – St. George's, Bristol, 17 May 2019
- Roderick Williams, Three Songs from Ethiopia Boy – Queen Elizabeth Hall, London, 7 July 2019
- James Wilson, with Yomi Sode, Remnants – Southbank Centre, London, 20 October 2020.
- Ayanna Witter-Johnson, Daniel Kidane, Shirley Thompson, Roderick Williams: Song of the Prophets: Requiem for the Climate – streamed online, June 2021
- Ayanna Witter-Johnson, Blush – Edinburgh Festival, August 2021
- Meena Karimi, Dawn – UK/European premiere Queen Elizabeth Hall, London, October 2021
- Joan Armatrading (also a singer-songwriter), Symphony No. 1 – Southbank Centre, London, November 2023

== Discography ==
- Signum Classics – Sibelius: Finlandia; Dvořák: Symphony No. 9 – Kevin John Edusei, conductor (1 CD, released 7 July 2017)
- Signum Classics – Rachmaninov: Piano Concerto No. 3; Sibelius: Symphony No. 2 – Gerard Aimontche, piano; Roderick Cox, conductor (2 CDs, released 28 September 2018)
- Orchid Classics – Stewart Goodyear: Callaloo, Piano Sonata; George Gershwin: Rhapsody in Blue – Stewart Goodyear, piano; Wayne Marshall, conductor (1 CD, released 31 May 2019)
- NMC – Roderick Williams: Three Songs from Ethiopia Boy – Roderick Williams, baritone; Eduardo Portal, conductor (download only, released 18 October 2019)
- NMC – "Spark Catchers" – Errollyn Wallen: Concerto Grosso; James Wilson: The Green Fuse; Daniel Kidane: Dream Song; Hannah Kendall: The Spark Catchers; Philip Herbert: Elegy: In Memoriam – Stephen Lawrence; Julian Joseph: Carry That Sound – Roderick Williams, baritone; Tai Murray, violin; Chi-chi Nwanoku, double bass; Isata Kanneh-Mason, piano; Anthony Parnther, conductor; Kevin John Edusei, conductor; Wayne Marshall, conductor (1 CD, released 17 January 2020)
- The New Four Seasons composed by Max Richter and performed with soloist Elena Urioste (released 10 June 2022 on Deutsche Grammophon)
- Coleridge-Taylor – Samuel Coleridge-Taylor: "Othello" Orchestral Suite Op. 79, African Suite Op. 35, Ballade in A minor Op. 33, Petite suite de concert Op. 77, Violin concerto Op. 80, Romance in G Op. 39, Nonet in F minor Op. 2, Avril Coleridge-Taylor: Sussex Landscape Op. 27; Elena Urioste, violin; Kalena Bovell, Roderick Cox, Kevin John Edusei, Fawzi Haimor, Anthony Parnther, conductors (October 2022, Decca Records)

== See also ==
- Nu Civilisation Orchestra
