= Daniel Kidane =

British composer (born 1986)

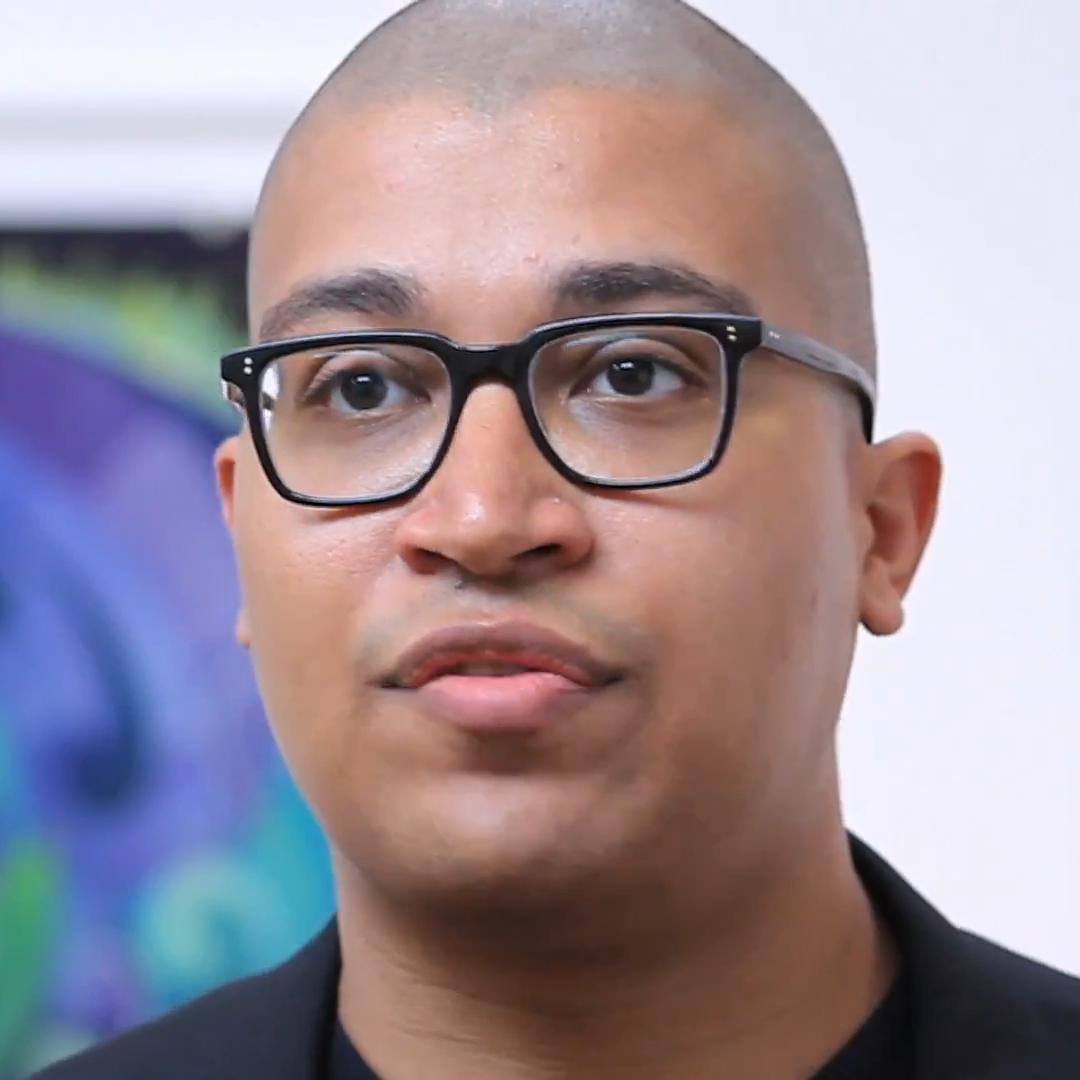
Kidane in 2015

Daniel Kidane (born 1986) is a British composer. His piece "Woke" opened the last night of the 2019 BBC Proms.

In 2016, Kidane's "Sirens" was one of a group of five short works commissioned by the BBC Philharmonic to commemorate the 400th anniversary of Shakespeare's death, and performed in the Bridgewater Hall. The Guardian's reviewer described it as a "propulsive, eclectic piece" which "soaked up influences of jungle, dubstep and R&B sampled from a trawl through the city after dark. "His 2017 work "Zulu" was performed by the Royal Scottish National Orchestra. His "Dream Song" was premiered at the Queen Elizabeth Hall by the Chineke! Orchestra on the re-opening of the hall in 2018 and the 50th anniversary of the funeral of Martin Luther King Jr., and includes words from his "I Have a Dream" speech. The concert was broadcast by BBC Radio 3. The orchestra later recorded the work on their album Spark Catchers.

In 2020, Kidane was commissioned by Huddersfield Choral Society to write "We'll Sing", with words by Simon Armitage, who worked from a list of words sent by choir members to reflect their experience of lockdown during the COVID-19 pandemic. This was released on a music video in autumn 2020.

In 2022, Kidane joined the Schott Music publishing company.

== Early life and education ==
Kidane was born in 1986, the som of a Russian mother and an Eritrean father. From South London, Kidane took Saturday music classes in Tooting. He played the recorder and the violin at school, and sang in the children's chorus of the English National Opera. He went on to study composition at the Royal Northern College of Music, where he graduated with a B.Mus in 2012. He has also studied at the St. Petersburg Conservatoire under Sergei Slonimsky.
