= Nicholas Carter (conductor) =

Australian conductor

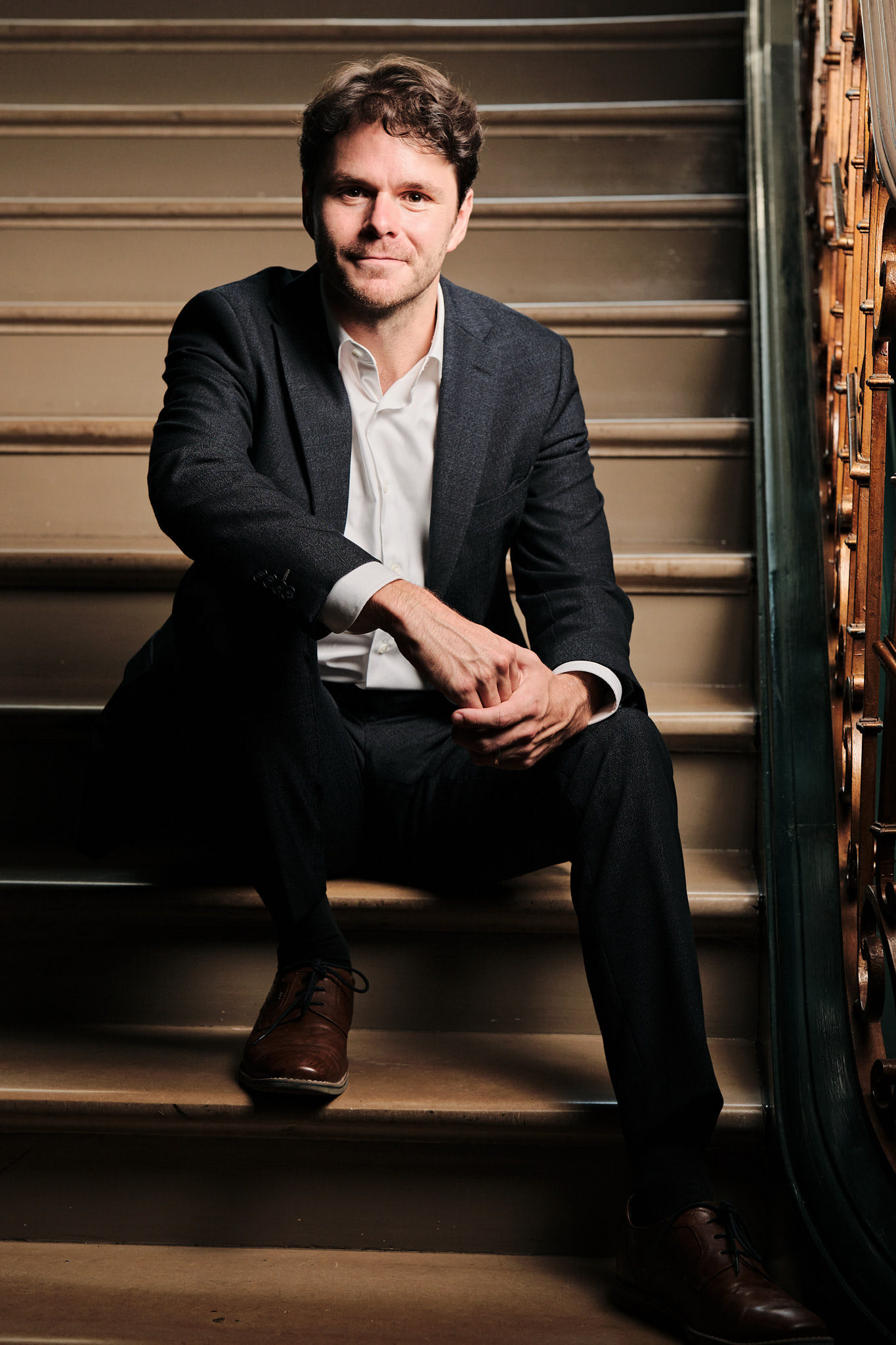
- Carter in 2023
- Born: Melbourne, Australia
- Education: University of Melbourne
- Occupation: Conductor

Nicholas Carter (born 1985) is an Australian conductor.

== Biography ==
=== Early life ===
Carter was born in Melbourne, Australia and began learning the violin and piano at school. Aged nine, he became member of the National Boys Choir of Australia, where he had his first exposure to orchestral music and opera, through involvement in concerts with the Melbourne Symphony Orchestra and Opera Australia.

Carter came under the mentorship of Richard Gill, one of Australia's leading music educators and conductors, and conducted his first opera production, Hans Krása's Brundibar for OzOpera in 2004. Following this and concurrent to his studies at the University of Melbourne, where he studied Piano and Voice, he continued to work with Gill in the newly formed Victorian Opera from 2006.

=== Career ===
In 2009, Vladimir Ashkenazy chose Carter as his assistant conductor with the Sydney Symphony Orchestra. Carter held this post for three seasons, during which time he met Sir Donald Runnicles and Simone Young, who became mentors to Carter.

Young appointed Carter as Kapellmeister and musical assistant at Hamburg State Opera from 2011, which saw him conduct The Magic Flute, Hänsel und Gretel, Lucia di Lammermoor, The Barber of Seville as well as assisting Young on a broad repertoire that including all ten Wagner operas.

From 2014, Carter was appointed Kapellmeister at the Deutsche Oper Berlin, working closely with Sir Donald Runnicles. His repertoire expanded, conducting productions of The Love for Three Oranges, La bohème, Prokofiev's Romeo and Juliet, L'elisir d'amore and Die Entführung aus dem Serail. In 2015, Carter was appointed principal conductor of the Adelaide Symphony Orchestra, becoming the first Australian conductor in 30 years to lead an Australian orchestra. He held the Adelaide post until 2019.

Carter became chief conductor of the Stadttheater Klagenfurt and the Kärntner Symphonieorchester as of the 2018–2019 season. He stood down from both posts in 2021. In 2021, he became chief conductor and co-opera director of Bühnen Bern. His work in Bern has included conducting the company's first production of Wagner's Der Ring des Nibelungen. He stood down from his Bühnen Bern posts at the close of the 2024–2025 season.

In November 2024, Staatsoper Stuttgart announced the appointment of Carter as its next general music director, effective with the 2026–2027 season.

Cultural offices
Preceded by Alexander Soddy	Chief Conductor, Kärntner Sinfonieorchester; 2018–2021	Succeeded by Nicholas Milton
Preceded by Kevin John Edusei	Chief Conductor, Bühnen Bern; 2021–2025	Succeeded by Alevtina Ioffe
