= Surrey Opera =

Surrey Opera is a semi-professional English opera company based in Croydon, providing opera in Surrey, Sussex and Kent. The company offers opportunity to emerging professional opera singers, providing the opportunity to work with professional directors, musicians, designers and the Surrey Opera Chorus. Alumni of Surrey Opera include known singers Peter Sidhom, Russell Smythe, Susan Gritton and David Soar. While opera forms the majority of its repertoire, the company also performs operettas, musicals and soirées.

The company premiered the rediscovered Samuel Coleridge-Taylor opera Thelma in 2012, and in 2017 staged the world premiere of The Life To Come, by Louis Mander and Stephen Fry.

== Company history ==
Surrey Opera was founded by the late Joyce Hooper MBE in 1969. The company's first production was Mozart's The Magic Flute, performed in the Market Hall, Redhill, Surrey in June 1970. Over the years, productions of all Mozart's major operas followed, as well works by other composers. In 1976, conductor Jonathan Butcher took over as Artistic Director, and has been at the helm ever since.

Surrey Opera have gained a reputation for staging new or re-discovered operas such as the world premiere of Thelma by Samuel Coleridge-Taylor and Iernin by George Lloyd, not staged since its premiere in 1934. Their second world premiere production, The Life to Come was staged in September 2017. Composed by Louis Mander to libretto by Stephen Fry, it was based on E.M.Forster's short story "The Life to Come".

Their third world premiere production, Madeleine, was commissioned by Surrey Opera for its 50th anniversary in 2020 from composer David Hackbridge Johnson, based on the true story of Madeleine Smith. Its performance was delayed until 2021 because of the COVID-19 pandemic.

They performed, in May 2023, the UK premiere of Sense & Sensibility, the Musical (book and lyrics by Jeffrey Haddow and music by Neal Hampton), based on the novel Sense_and_Sensibility by Jane_Austen.

In 2016 Surrey Opera performed for the Prince Of Wales and the Duchess of Cornwall at Minack Theatre in Cornwall.

== Past productions ==
Year	-
2025	Don_Pasquale
2024	Sense & Sensibility, The Musical - reprised at the Minack Theatre
2023	Sense & Sensibility, The Musical - UK Premiere
2022	Don_Giovanni
2021	Madeleine - World Premiere
2019	The Barber of Seville
2018	Candide
2017	The Life to Come - World Premiere
2016	A Midsummer Night's Dream
2015	Camelot
2014	Tosca
2013	Iernin
2012	Thelma - World Premiere, Die Fledermaus
2011	The Gondoliers, Albert Herring
2010	My Fair Lady; The Bartered Bride
2009	The Barber of Seville; Madam Butterfly
2008	The Merry Wives of Windsor
2007	The Marriage of Figaro; The Mikado
2006	The Beggar's Opera; A Masked Ball
2005	The Abduction from the Seraglio; Peter Grimes
2004	The Magic Flute; Fiddler on the Roof
2003	Macbeth; The Cunning Little Vixen
2002	The Pearl Fishers; Orpheus in the Underworld
2001	La traviata; La bohème
2000	Carmen
1999	Tosca; L'elisir d'amore
1998	Sweeney Todd; Cavalleria rusticana; Pagliacci
1997	The Flying Dutchman; Aida
1996	The Yeomen of the Guard; The Magic Flute
1995	Cavalleria rusticana; Pagliacci; Don Giovanni
1994	The Marriage of Figaro, Turandot
1993	Hansel and Gretel; Faust
1992	Hansel and Gretel; Die Fledermaus
1991	Così fan tutte; Nabucco
1990	Eugene Onegin; Madam Butterfly
1989	La traviata
1988	Falstaff; The Barber of Seville
1987	The Magic Flute; The Turn of the Screw
1986	Amahl and the Night Visitors; The Zoo; La bohème
1985	Don Giovanni
1984	Peter Grimes
1983	Carmen
1982	Fidelio
1981	The Marriage of Figaro; Dido and Aeneas; Noye's Fludde
1980	The Barber of Seville
1979	Idomeneo
1978	Carmen
1977	The Magic Flute
1976	La clemenza di Tito
1975	The Abduction from the Seraglio
1974	Fidelio
1973	Don Giovanni
1972	Così fan tutte
1971	The Marriage of Figaro
1970	The Magic Flute
