= Kalena Bovell =

American conductor

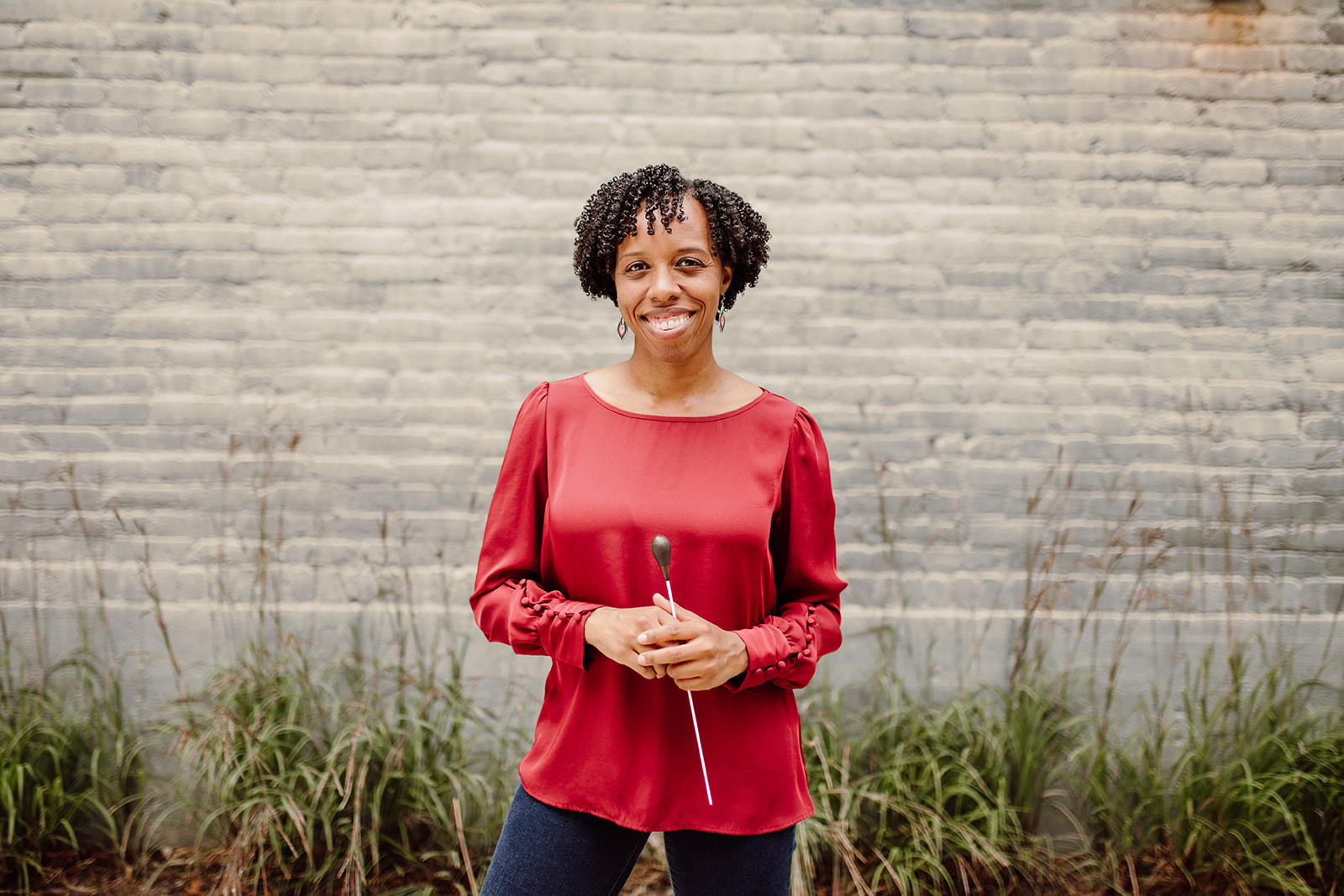
- Bovell in 2021 (photo by Jamie Pratt)
- Education: Chapman University; University of Hartford Hartt School
- Occupation: Conductor
- Awards: Distinguished Alumni Award (2021); Taki Alsop Conducting Fellowship (2022, 2023, 2024); 2024 Sphinx Medal of Excellence
- Website: www.kalenabovell.com

Kalena Bovell is a Panamanian-American conductor and recipient of the 2024 Sphinx Medal of Excellence. In addition to her work as a conductor, she is also active as a speaker and poet.

== Early life and education ==
A native of Los Angeles, Bovell began playing the violin at the age of eleven. She discovered her interest in conducting while pursuing a degree in music education at Chapman University’s College of the Performing Arts. After enrolling in an introductory conducting course, she decided to pursue conducting at the graduate level. Bovell earned both a Master of Music and a Graduate Professional Diploma in Orchestral Conducting from The Hartt School, where she studied under Edward Cumming. She also holds a Bachelor of Music Education from Chapman University, which recognized her as a Distinguished Alumna in 2021.

== Career ==
From 2019 to 2023, Bovell served as assistant conductor of the Memphis Symphony Orchestra and conductor of the Memphis Youth Symphony. As a guest conductor with the MSO, she led highlight events, including a collaboration with Hamilton star Leslie Odom Jr. and served as cover conductor for Music Director Mei-Ann Chen’s farewell concerts.

Bovell made her professional debut conducting the Chicago Sinfonietta at the Symphony Center in Chicago and served as its assistant conductor during the 2015–2016 season. Her guest and cover conducting credits also include the St. Louis Symphony, National Symphony Orchestra, and Hartford Symphony. From 2018 to 2019, she was music director of the Civic Orchestra of New Haven, where she expanded the ensemble’s repertoire and roster and also led Hartford Opera Theater’s two short operas during the 'New in November' festival.

In response to the 2020 COVID-19 pandemic and the Black Lives Matter movement, Bovell joined the #passthebaton challenge with Tony nominee Rob McClure, fostering a virtual community of musicians and vocalists.

Following her BBC Proms debut with the Chineke! Orchestra, she was featured on the ensemble’s 2022 album Coleridge-Taylor, a tribute to the Black British composer Samuel Coleridge-Taylor; reviews in The Arts Desk and the Evening Standard praised her contributions.

She collaborated with the Kennedy Center’s Reframing the Narrative initiative, which celebrates the contributions of Black ballet dancers, conducting Kevin Thomas’s Firebird in 2022 and returning in 2024 for works by Donald Byrd, Kiyon Ross, and Meredith Rainey.

In the 2024–2025 season, Bovell made her Sarasota Orchestra debut with the "Vivaldi Inspired" program, featuring works by Vivaldi, Stravinsky, Coleridge-Taylor, Holst, and Respighi, and made her South African debut with the Johannesburg and KwaZulu-Natal Philharmonic Orchestras during their Early Spring Seasons. The concerts, held in Johannesburg and Durban, highlighted her as part of a celebration of Women's Month and featured a program of Holst, Saint-Saëns, and Mendelssohn.

Bovell also maintained a strong commitment to education and contemporary music. She conducted the premiere of Hear Her Sing by Alexander Malinas with the San Francisco Conservatory of Music Orchestra in November 2024, led the Baltimore Symphony Orchestra’s Link Up program—an initiative designed to engage young audiences through interactive concerts—and, in July 2024, returned to the YOLA National Festival, part of the Los Angeles Philharmonic’s youth education initiative.

== Poetry ==
Outside of conducting, Bovell is also a published poet and has increasingly integrated her literary work into her musical career. Her original poem Tethered Voices was set to music by composer James Lee III and performed by the University of Michigan Symphony Orchestra.

== Honors and awards ==
In 2021, Chapman University recognized Bovell with the Distinguished Alumni Award. Bovell was awarded a Taki Alsop Conducting Fellowship from 2022 to 2024. Bovell has been awarded the 2024 Sphinx Medal of Excellence, the most prestigious honor conferred by the Sphinx Organization.

== Interviews ==
- The Conductor’s Podcast – "Productivity and Time Management Tips with Kalena Bovell"
- Rolling Out – "Chicago Sinfonietta conductor Kalena Bovell talks importance of music education"
- Colorado Music Festival – "Family Concert Conductor Kalena Bovell: 'Come Have Fun & Leave Excited'"
- Chapman University – "Career Q&A with Kalena Bovell ’09"
- Latina Today – "Kalena Bovell: Trailblazing Black Latina Conducts CSO in Tribute to Cincinnati's Latine Community"
- Shattering the Ceiling – "Conversation with Kalena Bovell"
- WKNO-FM 91.1 – "Treemonisha at Toronto's Luminato Festival"
- Sandi Klein’s Conversations with Creative Women
- Memphis Business Journal – "Women Who Lead: Kalena Bovell of the Memphis Symphony Orchestra"
- TO Live – "Backstage with...Kalena Bovell"
- Trilloquy – "Trilloquy Replay – 'Metal!'"
