= Kevin John Edusei =

German conductor (born 1976)

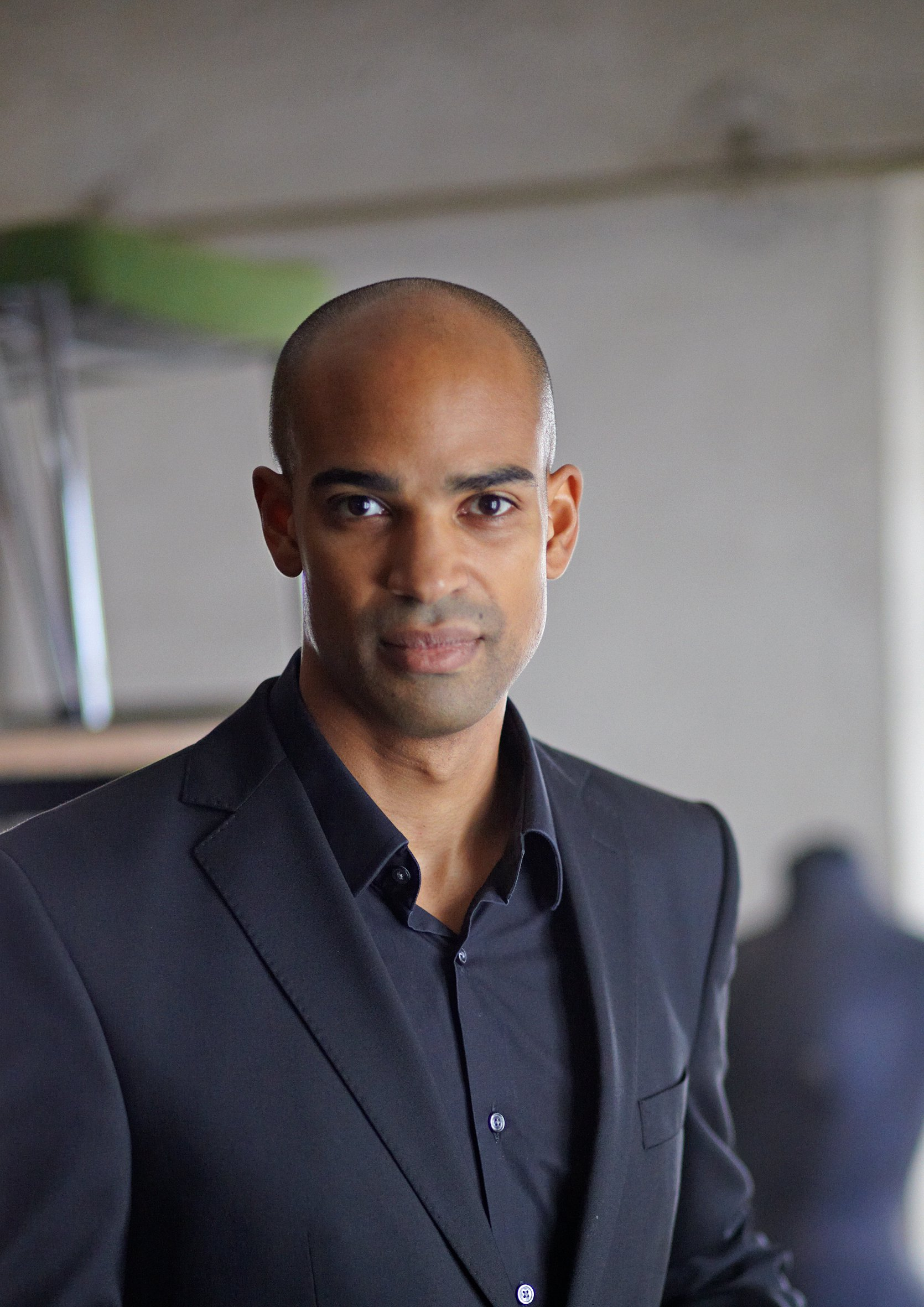
- Edusei in 2012
- Born: 5 August 1976 (age 50); Bielefeld, Germany
- Education: Royal Conservatory of The Hague
- Occupation: Conductor
- Organizations: Münchner Symphoniker; FWSO
- Website: kevinjohnedusei.com

Kevin John Edusei (born 5 August 1976) is a German conductor.

== Biography ==
Born in Bielefeld, Edusei studied orchestral conducting, classical percussion and sound engineering ("Tonmeister") at the Berlin University of the Arts and the Royal Conservatory of The Hague, where his teachers included Jac van Steen and Ed Spanjaard.

Edusei held a conducting scholarship at the 2004 Aspen Music Festival, where he was mentored by David Zinman. His other mentors included Kurt Masur, Péter Eötvös, Marc Albrecht, Peter Gülke and Sylvain Cambreling. In 2004, he became assistant conductor of the Ensemble Modern, Frankfurt, and served on the conducting staff of the Deutsches Nationaltheater Weimar for two seasons.

From the 2004-2005 season, Edusei served as First Kapellmeister and Deputy Generalmusikdirektor at the Theater Bielefeld. From 2007 to 2011, he worked in the same position at the Staatstheater Augsburg. He was a prize-winner at the 2007 Lucerne Festival Academy conducting masterclass, under the guidance of Pierre Boulez and Péter Eötvös and in 2008 he was the first-prize recipient in the Dimitris Mitropoulos Conducting Competition in Athens. Edusei is an alumnus of the Deutsche Bank Stiftung Akademie Musiktheater heute and the Dirigentenforum of the German Music Council.

In 2013, Edusei was named Chief Conductor of the Munich Symphony Orchestra. He continued in this post until the 2021/2022 season.

From 2015 to 2019, Edusei was Chief Conductor of the Konzert Theater Bern, having been named principal guest conductor in 2014. During his tenure, he led new productions of Peter Grimes, Salome, Ariadne auf Naxos, Bluebeard's Castle, Tannhäuser, Tristan und Isolde, Káťa Kabanová and a cycle of the Mozart–Da Ponte operas.

Edusei's guest conducting work has included his debut at the BBC Proms in August 2017 with the Chineke! Orchestra. In 2022, he returned to The Proms for its annual concert of Beethoven's Symphony No. 9, with Chineke! Orchestra.

Edusei first guest-conducted the Fort Worth Symphony Orchestra (FWSO) in September 2021. He subsequently served as the FWSO's principal guest conductor for three seasons, as of the 2022–2023 season.

In the UK, Edusei made his debut with the Royal Ballet and Opera, Covent Garden, in the autumn of 2022, conducting Puccini's La bohème. In September 2025, the Royal Philharmonic Orchestra announced the appointment of Edusei as its conductor-in-residence at Cadogan Hall for the 2025-2026 season.

== Awards ==
- 2007: Prize Winner, Lucerne Festival Academy
- 2008: 1st Prize Dimitri Mitropoulos Conducting Competition

== Recordings ==
Orchestra	Album	Soloist (if any)	Label	Release year
Munich Symphony Orchestra	Einschoch6: Die Stadt springt	Einschoch6	Solo Musica	2015
Munich Symphony Orchestra	Tchaikovsky: Extracts from the Nutcracker		Solo Musica	2016
Tonkünstler Orchestra	Enjott Schneider: Shadows in the Dark		WERGO	2016
Tonkünstler Orchestra	Enjott Schneider: Bach, Dracula, Vivaldi & Co.	Csaba Kelemen, trumpet, Stefan Langbein, trombone	WERGO	2016
Chineke! Orchestra	Dvořák & Sibelius		Signum Records	2017
Munich Symphony Orchestra	Schubert: Symphonies Nos 4 & 7 (four-movement realisation of Symphony No. 7)		Solo Musica	2017
Munich Symphony Orchestra	Schubert Symphonies Nos 5 & 6		Solo Musica	2018
Bern Symphony Orchestra	Korngold & Mozart: Violin Concertos		Claves Records	2018
Bern Symphony Orchestra	Shostakovich, Weinberg & Kobekin	Anastasia Kobekina, cello	Claves Records	2019
Munich Symphony Orchestra	1939	Fabiola Kim, violin	Solo Musica	2019
Munich Symphony Orchestra	Schubert Symphonies Nos 3 & 7		Solo Musica	2020
The Royal Opera	Puccini: La bohème	Ailyn Pérez (Mimì), Danielle de Niese (Musetta), Juan Diego Flórez (Rodolfo), Andrey Zhilikhovsky (Marcello)	RBO Stream	2022
The Royal Opera	Puccini: Madama Butterfly	Asmik Grigorian (Cio-Cio San), Joshua Guerrero (Pinkerton), Lauri Vasar (Sharpless), Hongni Wu (Suzuki), Ya-Chung Huang (Goro), Jeremy White (The Bonze)	Opus Arte	2024
London Symphony Orchestra	Rózsa: Violin Concerto – Bartók: Violin Concerto No. 2	Roman Simovic	LSO Live	2024

Cultural offices
Preceded by Georg Schmöhe	Chief Conductor, Munich Symphony Orchestra; 2014–2022	Succeeded by Joseph Bastian
Preceded by Srboljub Dinić	Chief Conductor, Konzert Theater Bern; 2015–2019	Succeeded by Nicholas Carter
