= Samuel Coleridge-Taylor =

English composer and conductor (1875–1912)

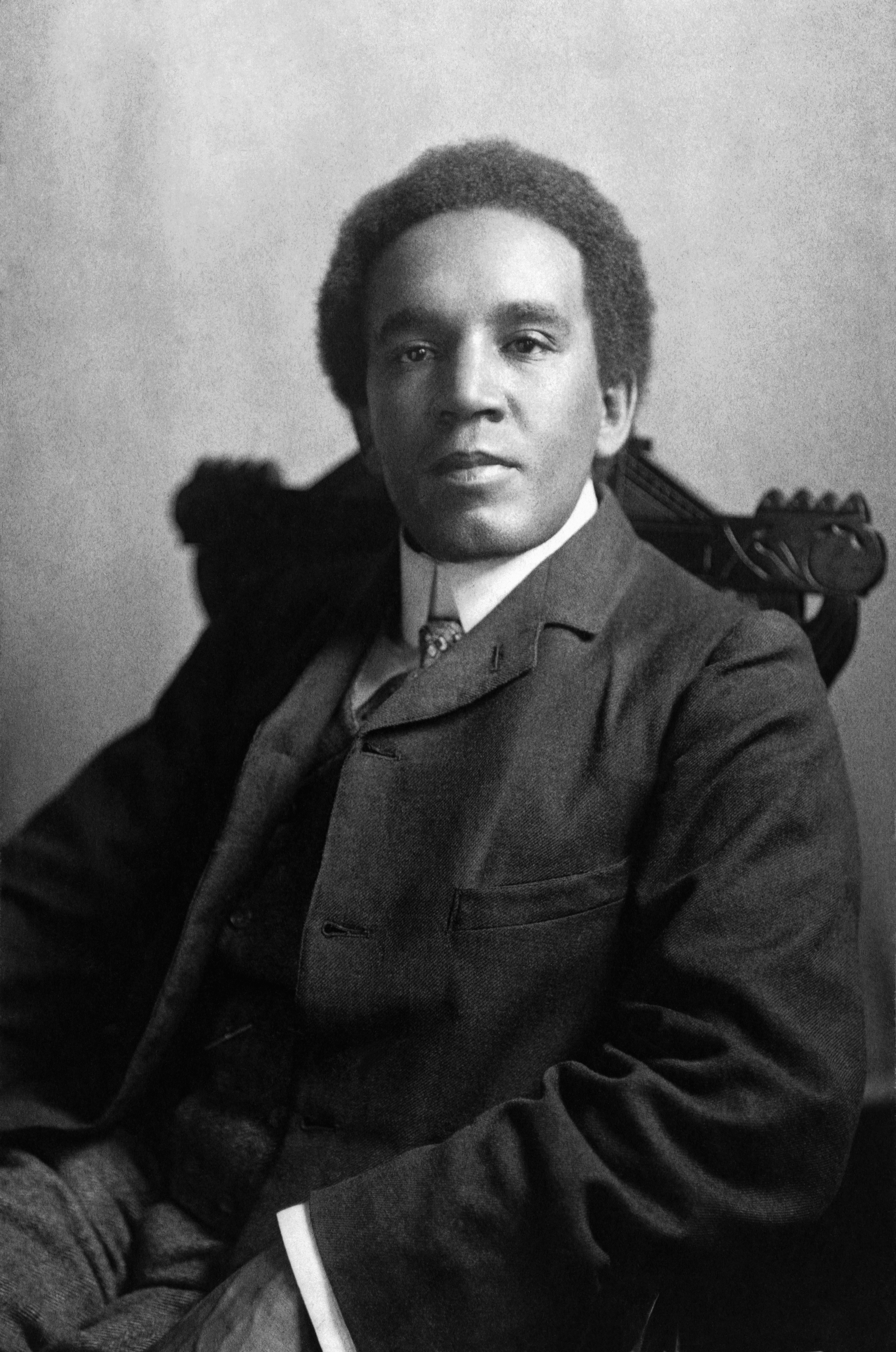
- Coleridge-Taylor in 1905
- Born: Samuel Coleridge Taylor; 15 August 1875; Holborn, London, England
- Died: 1 September 1912 (aged 37); Croydon, Surrey, England
- Education: Royal College of Music
- Occupations: Classical composer and musician
- Spouse: Jessie Walmisley (m. 1899)
- Children: Hiawatha and Avril Coleridge-Taylor

Samuel Coleridge-Taylor (15 August 1875 – 1 September 1912) was a British composer and conductor. He was particularly known for his three cantatas on the epic 1855 poem The Song of Hiawatha by American Henry Wadsworth Longfellow. Coleridge-Taylor premiered the first section in 1898, when he was 23. Of mixed-race descent, Coleridge-Taylor achieved such success that he was referred to by white musicians in New York City as the "African Mahler" when he had three tours of the United States in the early 1900s. He married an Englishwoman, Jessie Walmisley, and both their children had musical careers. Their son, Hiawatha, adapted his father's music for a variety of performances. Their daughter, Avril Coleridge-Taylor, became a composer and conductor.

== Early life and education ==
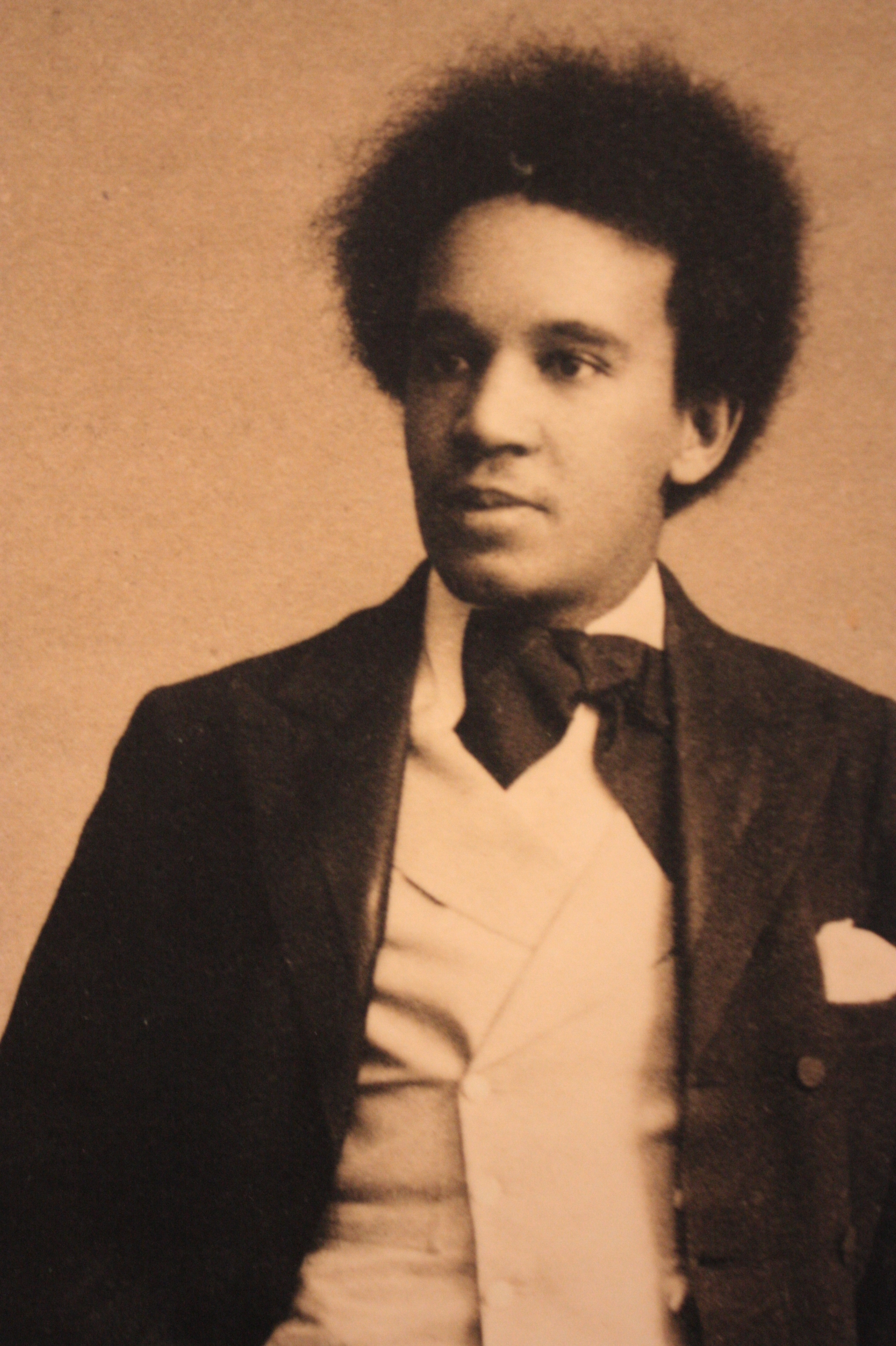
Coleridge-Taylor c. 1893

Samuel Coleridge-Taylor was born at 15 Theobalds Road in Holborn, London, to Alice Hare Martin (1856–1953), an Englishwoman, and Daniel Peter Hughes Taylor, a Creole man from Sierra Leone who had studied medicine in London and later became an administrator in West Africa. They were not married, and Daniel had returned to Africa without learning that Alice was pregnant. (Alice's parents had not been married at her birth, either.) Alice named her son Samuel Coleridge Taylor (without a hyphen), after the poet Samuel Taylor Coleridge.

Alice lived with her father, Benjamin Holmans, and his family after Samuel was born. Holmans was a skilled farrier and was married to a woman who was not Alice's mother, with whom he had four daughters and at least one son. Alice and her father called her son Coleridge. In 1887, she married George Evans, a railway worker, and lived in Croydon, on a street adjoining the railway line.

There were numerous musicians on Taylor's mother's side, and her father played the violin, teaching it to his grandson from an early age. Taylor's musical ability quickly became apparent, and his grandfather paid for him to have violin lessons. Taylor was awarded a scholarship to study at the Royal College of Music from the age of 15. He changed from the violin to composition, working under Charles Villiers Stanford. After completing his degree, Taylor became a professional musician; he was appointed a professor at the Crystal Palace School of Music and began conducting the orchestra at the Croydon Conservatoire.

He later used the name "Samuel Coleridge-Taylor", with a hyphen, said to be following a printer's error.

In 1894, Taylor's father was appointed a coroner in the colony of Gambia.

== Marriage ==
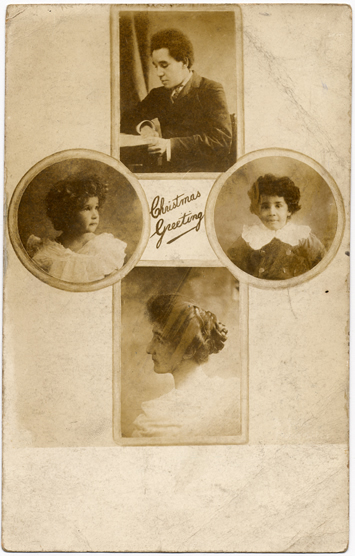
Christmas greeting card displaying the Coleridge-Taylor family, 1912

In 1899, Coleridge-Taylor married Jessie Walmisley, whom he had met as a fellow student at the Royal College of Music. Six years older than he, Jessie had left the college in 1893. Her parents objected to the marriage because Taylor was of mixed-race parentage, but relented and attended the wedding.

The couple had a son, named Hiawatha Bryan (1900–1980) after the poetic figure, and a daughter Gwendolen Avril (1903–1998). Both had careers in music: Hiawatha adapted his father's works. Gwendolen started composing music early in life, and also became a conductor-composer; she used the professional name of Avril Coleridge-Taylor.

== Career ==
By 1896, Coleridge-Taylor was already earning a reputation as a composer. He was later helped by Edward Elgar, who recommended him to the Three Choirs Festival. Coleridge-Taylor's "Ballade in A minor" was premiered there. His early work was also guided by the influential music editor and critic August Jaeger of music publisher Novello; he told Elgar that Taylor was "a genius".

On the strength of Hiawatha's Wedding Feast, which was conducted by Professor Charles Villiers Stanford at its 1898 premiere and proved to be highly popular, Coleridge-Taylor made three tours of the United States: in 1904, 1906, and 1910. In the United States, he became increasingly interested in his paternal racial heritage. Coleridge-Taylor participated as the youngest delegate at the 1900 First Pan-African Conference held in London, and met leading Americans through this connection, including the poet Paul Laurence Dunbar and the scholar and activist W. E. B. Du Bois.

Coleridge-Taylor's father Daniel Taylor was descended from formerly enslaved African Americans who were freed by the British and evacuated from the colonies at the end of the American War of Independence; some 3,000 of these Black Loyalists were resettled in Nova Scotia. Others were resettled in London and the Caribbean. In 1792, some 1200 blacks from Nova Scotia chose to leave what they considered a hostile climate and society, and moved to Sierra Leone, which the British had established as a colony for free blacks. The Black Loyalists joined free blacks (some of whom were also African Americans) from London, and were joined by maroons from Jamaica, and slaves liberated at sea from illegal slave ships by the British navy. At one stage, Coleridge-Taylor seriously considered emigrating to the United States, as he was intrigued by his father's family's past there.

In 1904, on his first tour to the United States, Coleridge-Taylor was received by President Theodore Roosevelt at the White House, a rare event in those days for a man of African descent. Coleridge-Taylor's music was widely performed and he had great support among African Americans. He sought to draw from traditional African music and integrate it into the classical tradition, which he considered Johannes Brahms to have done with Hungarian music and Antonín Dvořák with Bohemian music. Having met the African-American poet Paul Laurence Dunbar in London, Coleridge-Taylor set some of his poems to music. A joint recital between Coleridge-Taylor and Dunbar was arranged in London, under the patronage of US ambassador John Milton Hay. It was organised by Henry Francis Downing, an African-American playwright and London resident. Dunbar and other black people encouraged Coleridge-Taylor to draw from his Sierra Leonean ancestry and the music of the African continent.

Coleridge-Taylor's standing caused him to be invited to judge at music festivals. He was said to be personally shy but was still effective as a conductor.

Composers were not handsomely paid for their music, and they often sold the rights to works outright in order to make immediate income. This caused them to lose the royalties earned by the publishers who had invested in the music distribution through publication. The popular Hiawatha's Wedding Feast sold hundreds of thousands of copies, but Coleridge-Taylor had sold the music outright for the sum of 15 guineas, so did not benefit directly. He learned to retain his rights and earned royalties for other compositions after achieving wide renown but always struggled financially.

== Death ==
Coleridge-Taylor was 37 when he died of pneumonia. His death is often attributed to the stress of his financial situation. He was buried in Bandon Hill Cemetery, Wallington, Surrey (today in the London Borough of Sutton).

== Honours ==
- The inscription on Coleridge-Taylor's carved headstone includes four bars of music from the composer's best-known work, Hiawatha, and a tribute from his close friend, the poet Alfred Noyes, that includes these words:

Too young to die: his great simplicity, his happy courage in an alien world, his gentleness, made all that knew him love him.

- King George V granted Jessie Coleridge-Taylor, the young widow, an annual pension of £100 (equivalent to £12,356 in 2024), evidence of the high regard in which the composer was held.
- In 1912 a memorial concert was held at the Royal Albert Hall and garnered over £1400 for the composer's family.
- After Coleridge-Taylor's death in 1912, musicians were concerned that he and his family had received no royalties from his Song of Hiawatha, which was one of the most successful and popular works written in the previous 50 years. (He had sold the rights early in order to get income.) His case contributed to their formation of the Performing Right Society, an effort to gain revenues for musicians through performance as well as publication and distribution of music.

Coleridge-Taylor's work continued to be popular. He was later championed by conductor Malcolm Sargent. Between 1928 and 1939, Sargent conducted ten seasons of a large costumed ballet version of The Song of Hiawatha at the Royal Albert Hall, performed by the Royal Choral Society (600 to 800 singers) and 200 dancers.

== Legacy ==
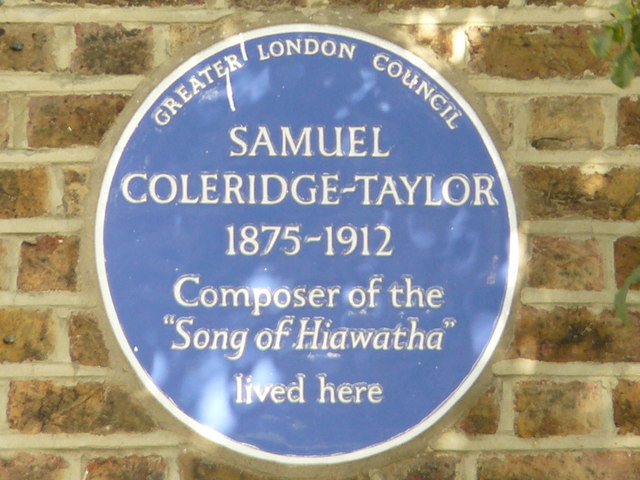
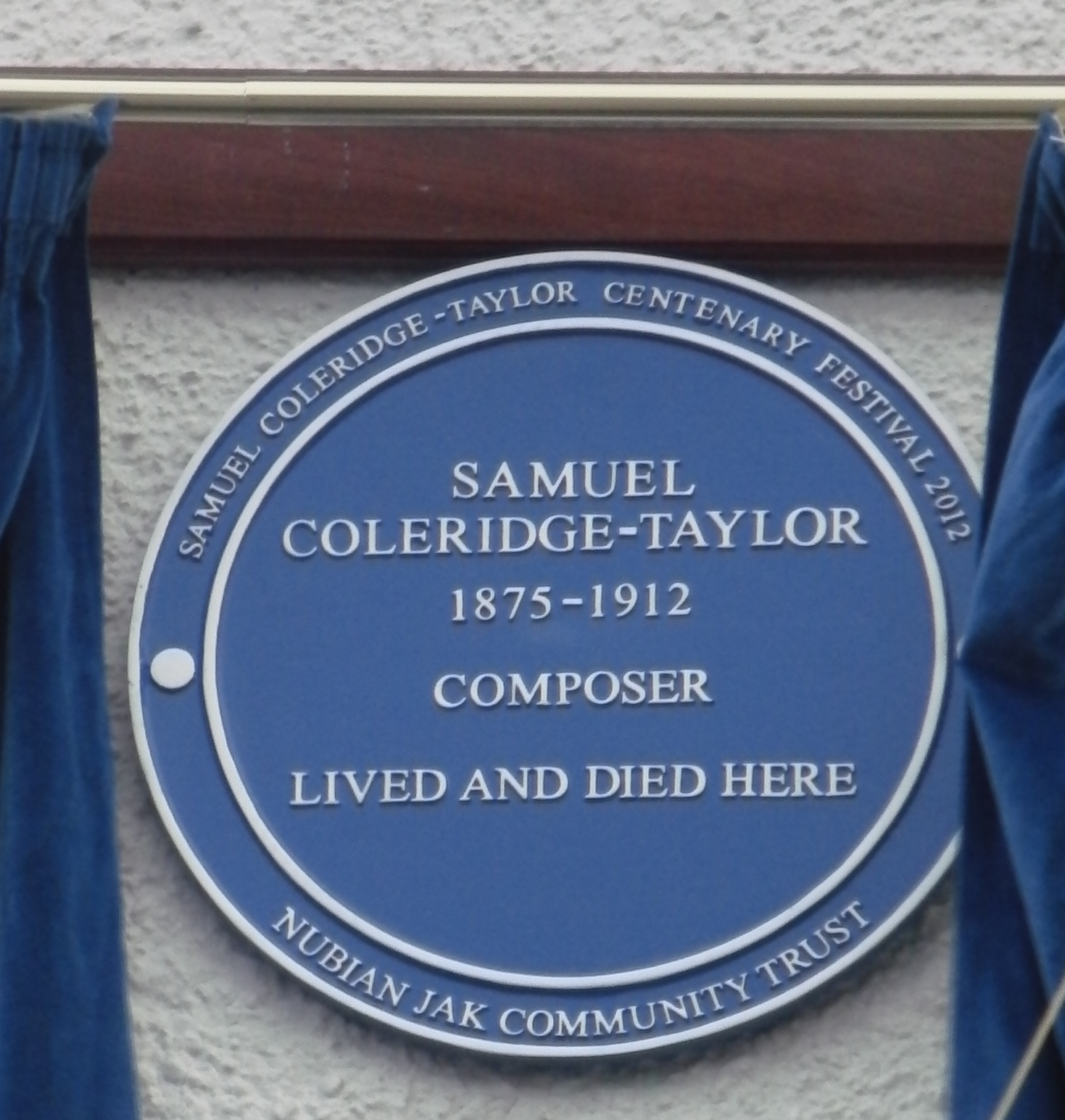
Plaques honouring Samuel Coleridge-Taylor in Dagnall Park, Selhurst (top) and Croydon (bottom)

Coleridge-Taylor's greatest success was undoubtedly his cantata Hiawatha's Wedding Feast, which was widely performed by choral groups in England during Coleridge-Taylor's lifetime and in the decades after his death. Its popularity was rivalled only by the choral standards Handel's Messiah and Mendelssohn's Elijah. The composer soon followed Hiawatha's Wedding Feast with two other cantatas about Hiawatha, The Death of Minnehaha and Hiawatha's Departure. All three were published together, along with an Overture, as The Song of Hiawatha, Op. 30. The tremendously popular Hiawatha seasons at the Royal Albert Hall, which continued until 1939, were conducted by Sargent and involved hundreds of choristers, and scenery covering the organ loft. Hiawatha's Wedding Feast is still occasionally revived.

Coleridge-Taylor also composed chamber music, anthems, and the African Dances for violin, among other works. The Petite Suite de Concert is still regularly played. He set one poem by his namesake Samuel Taylor Coleridge, "Kubla Khan".

Coleridge-Taylor was greatly admired by African Americans; in 1901, a 200-voice African-American chorus was founded in Washington, D.C., named the Samuel Coleridge-Taylor Society. He visited the United States three times in the early 1900s, receiving great acclaim, and earned the title "the African Mahler" from the white orchestral musicians in New York in 1910. Public schools were named after him in Louisville, Kentucky, and in Baltimore, Maryland.

Coleridge-Taylor composed a violin concerto in 1912 for the American violinist Maud Powell. The American performance of the work was subject to rewriting because the parts were lost en route—not, as legend has it, on the RMS Titanic but on another ship. The concerto has been recorded by Philippe Graffin and the Johannesburg Philharmonic Orchestra under Michael Hankinson (nominated "Editor's Choice" in Gramophone magazine), Anthony Marwood and the BBC Scottish Symphony Orchestra under Martyn Brabbins (on Hyperion Records), and Lorraine McAslan and the London Philharmonic Orchestra conducted by Nicholas Braithwaite (on the Lyrita label). It was also performed at Harvard University's Sanders Theatre in the autumn of 1998 by John McLaughlin Williams and William Thomas, as part of the 100th-anniversary celebration of the composition of Hiawatha's Wedding Feast. On 19 July 2023 it was performed at the BBC Proms with Elena Urioste as soloist with the BBC National Orchestra of Wales under Tadaaki Otaka.

Lists of Coleridge-Taylor's compositions and recordings of his work and of the many articles, papers and books about Coleridge-Taylor's life and legacy are available through the Samuel Coleridge-Taylor Foundation and the Samuel Coleridge-Taylor Network.

There are two blue plaques in his memory: one in Dagnall Park, South Norwood, and the other in St Leonards Road, Croydon, at the house where he died. A metal figure in the likeness of Coleridge-Taylor has been installed in Charles Street, Croydon.

A two-hour documentary about him, Samuel Coleridge Taylor and His Music in America, 1900–1912 (2013), includes a performance of several of his pieces, as well as information about him and his prominent place in music. It was written and directed by Charles Kaufmann, and produced by The Longfellow Chorus.

A feature animation, titled The Samuel Coleridge-Taylor Story (2013), was made about him, written and directed by Jason Young. It was screened as part of Southwark Black History Month and Croydon Black History Month in 2020.

Chi-chi Nwanoku presented in 2017 on the Sky Arts series Passions a programme about Samuel Coleridge-Taylor.

On 26 August 2021, Coleridge-Taylor's Symphony in A minor received its Proms premiere by the Chineke! Orchestra with Kalena Bovell.

On 1 September 2023, Coleridge-Taylor's Four Novelletten received its Proms premiere by the Chineke! Orchestra with Anthony Parnther.

The American composer Coleridge-Taylor Perkinson (1932–2004) was named after Samuel Coleridge-Taylor.

== Posthumous publishing ==
A 1912 obituary in the African Methodist Episcopal Church Review

In 1999, freelance music editor Patrick Meadows identified three important chamber works by Coleridge-Taylor that had never been printed or made widely available to musicians. A handwritten performing parts edition of the Piano Quintet, from the original in the Royal College of Music (RCM) Library, had been prepared earlier by violinist Martin Anthony Burrage of the Royal Liverpool Philharmonic. The first modern performance of the Piano Quintet was given on 7 November 2001 by Burrage's chamber music group, Ensemble Liverpool / Live-A-Music in Liverpool Philharmonic Hall. The lunchtime recital included the Fantasiestücke. Live recordings of this performance are lodged with the RCM and the British Library. The artists were Andrew Berridge (violin), Martin Anthony (Tony) Burrage (violin), Joanna Lacey (viola), Michael Parrott (cello) and John Peace (piano).

The first modern performance of the Nonet was given on 8 July 1998 at the International Clarinet Association ClarinetFest in Columbus, Ohio. The performing edition by Jane Ellsworth was published in 1998 and 2025 by Tecchler Press

After receiving copies of the work from the RCM in London, Patrick Meadows made printed playing editions of the Nonet, Piano Quintet and Piano Trio. The works were performed in Meadows's regular chamber music festival on the island of Mallorca, and were well received by the public as well as the performers.

The first modern performances of some of these works were done in the early 1990s by the Boston, Massachusetts-based Coleridge Ensemble, led by William Thomas of Phillips Academy, Andover. This group subsequently made world premiere recordings of the Nonet, Fantasiestücke for string quartet and Six Negro Folksongs for piano trio, which were released in 1998 by Afka Records. Thomas, a champion of lost works by black composers, also revived Coleridge's Hiawatha's Wedding Feast in a performance commemorating the composition's 100th anniversary with the Cambridge Community Chorus at Harvard's Sanders Theatre in the spring of 1998. In 2006, Meadows finished engraving the first edition of Coleridge-Taylor's Symphony in A minor. Meadows has also transcribed from the RCM manuscript the Haytian Dances, a work virtually identical to the Noveletten but with a fifth movement inserted by Coleridge-Taylor, based on the Scherzo of the symphony. This work is for string orchestra, tambourine and triangle.

The Nash Ensemble's recording of the Piano Quintet was released in 2007.

=== Thelma, the missing opera ===
Coleridge-Taylor's only large-scale operatic work, Thelma, was long believed to have been lost. As recently as 1995, Geoffrey Self in his biography of Coleridge-Taylor, The Hiawatha Man, stated that the manuscript of Thelma had not been located, and that the piece may have been destroyed by its creator. While researching for a PhD on the life and music of Samuel Coleridge-Taylor, Catherine Carr unearthed the manuscripts of Thelma in the British Library. She assembled a libretto and catalogued the opera in her thesis, presenting a first critical examination of the work by a thorough investigation of the discovered manuscripts (including copious typeset examples). The work subsequently appeared as such on the catalogue of the British Library.

Thelma is a saga of deceit, magic, retribution and the triumph of love over wickedness. The composer followed Richard Wagner's manner in eschewing the established "numbers" opera format, preferring to blend recitative, aria and ensemble into a seamless whole. It is possible that he had read Marie Corelli's 1887 "Nordic" novel Thelma (it appears that the name "Thelma" may have been created by Corelli for her heroine). Coleridge-Taylor composed Thelma between 1907 and 1909; it is alternatively entitled The Amulet.

The full score and vocal score in the British Library are both in the composer's hand – the full score is unbound but complete (save that the vocal parts do not have the words after the first few folios) but the vocal score is bound (in three volumes) and complete with words. Patrick Meadows and Lionel Harrison prepared a type-set full score, vocal score and libretto (the librettist is uncredited and may be Coleridge-Taylor himself). As to the heroine of the title, the composer changed her name to "Freda" in both full and vocal scores (although in the full score he occasionally forgets himself and writes "Thelma" instead of "Freda"). Perhaps Coleridge-Taylor changed the name of his heroine (and might have changed the name of the opera, had it been produced) to avoid creating the assumption that his work was a treatment of Corelli's then very popular novel. Since that precaution is scarcely necessary today, Meadows and Harrison decided to revert to the original Thelma.

There are minor discrepancies between the full score and the vocal score (the occasional passage occurring in different keys in the two, for example), but nothing that would inhibit the production of a complete, staged performance.

Thelma received its world première in Croydon's Ashcroft Theatre in February 2012, the centenary year of the composer's death, performed by Surrey Opera, using an edition prepared by Stephen Anthony Brown. It was conducted by Jonathan Butcher, directed by Christopher Cowell and designed by Bridget Kimak. Joanna Weeks sang the title role, with Alberto Sousa as Eric and Håkan Vramsmo as Carl.

== List of compositions ==
=== With opus number ===
- Piano Quintet in G minor, Op. 1 – 1893
- Nonet in F minor for oboe, clarinet, bassoon, horn, violin, viola, cello, contrabass and piano, Op. 2 – 1894
- Suite for Violin and Organ (or piano), Op. 3 (Suite de Piêces) – 1893
- Ballade in D minor, Op. 4 – 1895
- Five Fantasiestücke, Op. 5 – 1896
- Little Songs for Little Folks, Op. 6 – 1898
- Zara's Earrings, Op. 7 – 1895
- Symphony in A minor, Op. 8 – 1896
- Two Romantic Pieces, Op. 9 – 1896
- Quintet in F-sharp minor for clarinet and strings, Op. 10 – 1895
- Southern Love Songs, Op. 12 – 1896
- String Quartet in D minor, Op. 13 – 1896 (lost)
- Legend (Concertstück), Op. 14
- Land of the Sun, Op. 15 – 1897
- Three Hiawatha Sketches for violin and piano, Op. 16 – 1897
- African Romances (P. L. Dunbar) Op. 17 – 1897
- Morning and Evening Service in F, Op. 18 – 1899
- Two Moorish Tone-Pictures, Op. 19 – 1897
- Gypsy Suite, Op. 20 – 1898
- Part Songs, Op. 21 – 1898
- Four Characteristic Waltzes, Op. 22 – 1899
- Valse-Caprice, Op. 23 – 1898
- In Memoriam, three rhapsodies for low voice and piano, Op. 24 – 1898
- Dream Lovers, Operatic Romance, Op. 25 – 1898
- The Gitanos, cantata-operetta, Op. 26 – 1898
- Violin Sonata in D minor, Op. 28 – ?1898 (pub. 1917)
- Three Songs, Op. 29 – 1898
- The Song of Hiawatha, Op. 30 ("Overture to The Song of Hiawatha", 1899; "Hiawatha's Wedding Feast", 1898; "The Death of Minnehaha", 1899; "Hiawatha's Departure", 1900)
- Three Humoresques, Op. 31 – 1898
- Ballade in A minor, Op. 33 – 1898
- African Suite, Op. 35 – 1899
- Six Songs, Op. 37
- Three Silhouettes, Op. 38 – 1904
- Romance in G, Op. 39 – 1900
- Solemn Prelude, Op. 40 – 1899
- Scenes from an Everyday Romance, Op. 41 – 1900
- The Soul's Expression, four sonnets, Op. 42 – 1900
- The Blind Girl of Castél-Cuillé, Op. 43
- Idyll, Op. 44 – 1901
- Six American Lyrics, Op. 45 – 1903
- Concert Overture, Toussaint L'Ouverture, Op. 46 – 1901
- Hemo Dance, scherzo, Op. 47(1) – 1902
- Herod, incidental music, Op. 47(2) – 1901
- Meg Blane, Rhapsody of the Sea, Op. 48 – 1902
- Ullyses, incidental music, Op. 49 – 1902
- Three Song Poems, Op. 50 – 1904
- Ethiopia Saluting the Colours: March Op. 51 – 1902
- Four Novelletten for string orchestra, Op. 52 – 1903
- The Atonement, sacred cantata, Op. 53 – 1903
- Five Choral Ballads, Op. 54 – 1904
- Moorish Dance, Op. 55 – 1904
- Three Cameos for Piano, Op. 56 – 1904
- Six Sorrow Songs, Op. 57 – 1904
- Four African Dances, Op. 58 – 1904
- Twenty-Four Negro Melodies, Op. 59(1) – 1905
- Romance, Op. 59(2) – 1904
- Kubla Khan, rhapsody, Op. 61 – 1905
- Nero, incidental music, Op. 62 – 1906
- Symphonic Variations on an African Air, Op. 63 – 1906
- Scenes de Ballet, Op. 64 – 1906
- Endymion's Dream, cantata, Op. 65 – 1910
- Forest Scenes, Op. 66 – 1907
- Part Songs, Op. 67 – 1905
- Bon-Bon Suite, Op. 68 – 1908
- Sea Drift, Op. 69 – 1908
- Faust, incidental music, Op. 70 – 1908
- Valse Suite: "Three fours", Op. 71 – 1909
- Thelma, opera in three acts, Op. 72 – 1907–09
- Ballade in C minor, Op. 73 – 1909
- Forest of Wild Thyme, incidental music, Op. 74 (five numbers) – 1911–25
- Rhapsodic Dance, The Bamboula, Op. 75 – 1911
- A Tale of Old Japan, Op. 76 – 1911
- Petite Suite de Concert, Op. 77 – 1911
- Three Impromptus, Op. 78 – 1911
- Othello, incidental music, Op. 79 – 1911
- Violin Concerto in G minor, Op. 80 – 1912
- Two Songs for Baritone Voice, Op. 81 – 1913
- Hiawatha, ballet in five scenes, Op. 82 – 1920

=== Without opus number ===
- Eulalie
- From the Prairie
- The Lee Shore
- Trio in E minor - 1893
- Variations for Cello and Piano

== Recordings ==
- Samuel Coleridge-Taylor: Chamber Music – Hawthorne String Quartet. Label: Koch International 3-7056-2 (1992)
- Ballade in A minor, Op. 33, Symphonic Variations on an African Air, Op. 63 – Royal Liverpool Philharmonic, Grant Llewellyn, Argo Records 436 401-2 (1993)
- Sir Malcolm Sargent conducts British Music includes "Othello Suite" – New Symphony Orchestra. Label: Beulah Records 1PD13 (1995)
- Hiawatha – Welsh National Opera, – conductor Kenneth Alwyn, soloist Bryn Terfel. Label: Decca 458 591–2 (1998)
- Quintet for Piano & Strings in G min. Op. 1, Fantasiestucke for String Quartet Op. 5 – Live-A-Music (2001)
- Violin Sonata; African Dances; Hiawathan Sketches; Petite Suite de Concert – David Juritz (violin), Michael Dussek (piano). Label: Epoch CDLX 7127 (2002)
- The Romantic Violin Concerto Volume 5 includes "Violin Concerto in G minor, Op. 80" – Anthony Marwood (violin), BBC Scottish Symphony Orchestra, Martyn Brabbins (conductor). Label: Hyperion CDA67420 (2005)
- Symphony, Op. 8, Aarhus Symphony Orchestra, Douglas Bostock (conductor), in The British Symphonic Collection, Vol. 15. Classico label by Olufsen Records (2006)
- Piano & Clarinet Quintets – Nash Ensemble. Label: Hyperion CDA67590 (2007)
- 2nd of the Three Impromptus, Op. 78 for organ, on Now Let Us Sing!, Choir of Worcester Cathedral, played by Christopher Allsop (2013)
- Heart & Hereafter – Collected Songs, Elizabeth Llewellyn (soprano), Simon Lepper (piano). Label: Orchid Classics ORC100164 (2021)
- Fantasiestücke in Dvořák: String Quartet Op 106; Coleridge-Taylor: Fantasiestücke by the Takács Quartet, Hyperion Records (2023)
- Choral Music of Samuel Coleridge-Taylor: London Choral Sinfonia directed by Michael Waldron. Orchid Classics ORC100247 (2023)
- Samuel Coleridge Taylor: Partsongs, The Choir of King's College London, Joseph Fort (director). Label: Delphian Records DCD34271 (2023)
- Toussaint L’Ouverture, Ballade Op. 4, Selections from 24 Negro Melodies, Suite from 24 Negro Melodies, National Philharmonic/Michael Repper. Avie AV2763 (2025)
- Orchestral Music, incl. Ethiopia Saluting the Colours (March), Solemn Prelude, Zara’s Earrings, Idyll, Ballade for violin and orchestra, Entr’acte from Nero, Romance in B for strings, Ulster Orchestra, Charles Peebles. Somm CD0713 (2025)
