= Marjorie Drawbell =

British artist

Marjorie Violet G Drawbell (1 March 1903 – 27 April 2000) was a British sculptor, known for creating a number of designs that were reproduced as pottery and jewellery items.

== Biography ==
Born in England, Drawbell studied at the Regent Street Polytechnic in central London from 1919 to 1921. After graduating, Drawbell worked as an assistant to Charles Vyse and worked with him in creating ceramic figures for Poole Pottery. She created animal and human figures, usually for private commissions, some of which were re-created in silver by the jewellery company Asprey. Drawbell was a regular exhibitor at the Royal Academy in London, showing a total of eighteen works there between 1943 and 1961. In 1961 she published Making Pottery Figures, a book on pottery methods and techniques. Drawbell was also a painter and had an exhibition of her paintings at the Zaydler Gallery in 1970. In 1948 she was elected an Associate member of the Royal Society of British Sculptors and was made a Fellow of that Society in 1957.
