= Chi-chi Nwanoku =

British musician

Chi-Chi Nwanoku CBE
- Born: Chinyere Adah Nwanoku; June 1956 (age 70); Fulham, London, England
- Occupations: Double bassist; founder and artistic director of Chineke! Orchestra
- Website: www.chineke.org/our-founder

Chinyere Adah "Chi-Chi" Nwanoku CBE (/ˈtʃɪtʃi ˈnwænoʊkuː/; born June 1956) is a British double bassist and professor of Historical Double Bass Studies at the Royal Academy of Music. Nwanoku was a founder member and principal bassist of the Orchestra of the Age of Enlightenment, a position she held for 30 years.

Of Nigerian and Irish descent, she was the founder and artistic director of the Chineke! Orchestra, the first professional orchestra and junior orchestra in Europe to be made up of a majority of Black and ethnically diverse musicians.

== Early life ==
Nwanoku is of Nigerian and Irish descent and is the oldest of the five children of her parents, Dr Michael Nwanoku and his wife Margaret (née Hevey). Nwanoku's mother, Margaret, was disowned by her parents due to having an interracial relationship; however, Margaret's mother secretly travelled to London three months after the birth of Nwanoku. Nwanoku was born in Fulham, London, and before reaching school age she lived in Imo State, Nigeria, where her family went for two years. Nwanoku attended Kendrick Girls' Grammar School in Reading, Berkshire. At the age of seven she began her education as a classical musician, first piano, and at the age of 18 bass. Nwanoku subsequently studied at the Royal Academy of Music while undertaking training as a 100-metre sprinter but had to end her athletic career following a knee injury.

== Career ==
Nwanoku was the founder of the Chineke! Orchestra, Europe's first classical orchestra made up of a majority of black and ethnically diverse musicians. The orchestra, made up of 62 musicians representing 31 different nationalities, first performed in 2015 at the Queen Elizabeth Hall. In September, 2026 she resigned from Chineke! after having been suspended in December, 2024, over "code of conduct issues".

Nwanoku has also worked as principal double bass of the ensemble Endymion, the London Mozart Players, the Academy of St Martin in the Fields, the English Baroque Soloists, the London Classical Players and the Orchestre Revolutionnaire et Romantique.

Her academic appointments include Professor of Double Bass at the Royal Academy of Music and Visiting Fellow at Jesus College, Cambridge.

Besides playing and teaching bass, she has been active as a broadcaster, as in BBC Radio 3 Requests and in BBC TV Proms and as a member of BBC's Classical Star jury. In 2015 Nwanoku presented the BBC Radio 4 programmes In Search of the Black Mozart, featuring the lives and careers of black classical composers and performers from the 18th century, including Joseph Bologne, Chevalier de Saint-Georges; Ignatius Sancho; and George Bridgetower. She has also presented an episode of the Sky Arts TV series Passions, on the life and work of British composer Samuel Coleridge-Taylor. Other positions held by Nwanoku include being a former board member of the National Youth Orchestra, Tertis Foundation, London Music Fund, Royal Philharmonic Society (Council), and the Association of British Orchestras board. She is also a former Patron of Music Preserved, and is a current Patron of the Cherubim Trust.

Nwanoku was a guest of BBC Radio 4's Desert Island Discs on 11 February 2018.

In 2019, Nwanoku opened the new site of Hackney New Primary School, a specialist music school for children.

In October 2020, she presented a six-part radio show on Classic FM called Chi-chi's Classical Champions, a programme highlighting the music of contemporary and historical composers of Black, Asian and ethnically diverse heritage. A second series was broadcast in 2021.

In September 2023, Nwanoku was the guest on the BBC Radio 4 programme Great Lives; her choice was Jessye Norman.

She featured in Stormzy's book Superheroes: Inspiring Stories of Secret Strength.

Nwanoku lives in London and has two children.

== Honours, awards and recognition ==
Nwanoku was appointed Member of the Order of the British Empire (MBE) in the 2001 Birthday Honours for services to music, Officer of the Order of the British Empire (OBE) in the 2017 Birthday Honours for services to music and Commander of the Order of the British Empire (CBE) in the 2022 Birthday Honours for services to music and diversity.

She is an honorary fellow of both the Royal Academy of Music and Trinity Laban Conservatoire of Music. In 2018 she was made an honorary doctor of music at the University of Chichester. In 2023 she was made an honorary bencher of the Middle Temple, and was made an honorary doctor of music at both Cambridge University and the University of Kent.

In 2018 the BBC Woman's Hour placed Nwanoku ninth in a list of the world's most powerful women in music and she has also been listed in the 2019, 2020, 2021, 2022, 2023 and 2024 Powerlist of the most influential Black Britons of the year.
