= Schaumann =

Schaumann is a German locational surname, derived from places in Germany called Schaum. Notable individuals with this surname include:

- Axel Schaumann (born 1961), German athlete
- Eugen Schauman (1875–1904), Finnish nationalist
- Göran Schaumann (born 1940), Finnish sailor
- Jörgen Nilsen Schaumann (1879–1953), Swedish dermatologist
- Ruth Schaumann (1899–1975), German artist

== See also ==
- Schauman
- Schaumann body
