= Cæsar Peter Møller Boeck =

Norwegian dermatologist (1845–1917)

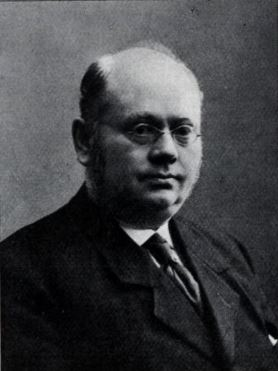
Cæsar Peter Møller Boeck

Cæsar Peter Møller Boeck (28 September 1845 – 17 March 1917) was a Norwegian dermatologist. He described Boeck's sarcoidosis.

== Life ==
Boeck was born in Lier, Norway. He was a nephew to dermatologist Carl Wilhelm Boeck and zoologist Christian Peder Bianco Boeck.

In 1871, he graduated from the Christiania Medical School (in present-day Oslo), and did post-graduate work in Vienna under Ferdinand von Hebra. In 1889, he was appointed chief of dermatology at the Rikshospitalet in Kristiania, later becoming an associate professor in 1895.

A specialist in histological research, Boeck is remembered for describing a granulomatous disease that affects the lymph nodes, as well as other parts of the body. In 1899, he provided a comprehensive description of skin changes along with general lymph node destruction that was associated with the disease. The condition was later named Boeck's sarcoidosis, and is sometimes referred to as "Besnier-Boeck-Schaumann disease" (named in conjunction with Ernest Henri Besnier and Jörgen Nilsen Schaumann). Boeck published his findings of the disorder in an article titled "Multiple benign sarcoid of the skin".

Boeck was a fluent speaker of German, English and French, and travelled extensively throughout Europe during his career. He was an aficionado of art, and spent much of his free time in art museums. In 1917, he published a treatise on Rembrandt called Rembrandt og Saskia i deres hjem (Rembrandt and Saskia in their home). In his will he donated his art collection to the Drammen city museum.

He was co-founder of the magazine Tidsskrift for praktisk Medicin (1881–1886).
