= Uveoparotitis =

Inflammation of the parotid gland and uvea

- Differential diagnosis: Heerfordt's syndrome

Uveoparotitis is a symptom of sarcoidosis. It describes a chronic inflammation of the parotid gland (parotitis) and part of the eye called the uvea (uveitis). There is also a phenomenon called Waldenström's uveoparotitis, where the symptom is related to Heerfordt's syndrome. The condition was first described in 1909.

== Signs and symptoms ==
Uveoparotitis is characterized by parotitis, uveitis and low grade fever. Parotitis leads to swelling and enlargement of the parotid glands, while uveitis causes eye redness, pain and blurred vision. Weakness of the facial muscles (cranial nerve palsy) may occur, which particularly affect the seventh cranial nerve.
