= BHL =

BHL may refer to:

== Ice hockey ==
- Belarusian Extraleague
- Bosnia and Herzegovina Hockey League
- British Hockey League

== Others ==
- Bernard-Henri Lévy, French intellectual
- Bibliotheca Hagiographica Latina, a hagiographical sourcebook
- Biodiversity Heritage Library, a consortium of libraries
- Bilateral hilar lymphadenopathy
