= Testicular sarcoidosis =

Sarcoidosis is a systemic disease of unknown cause that results in the formation of non-caseating granulomas in multiple organs. The prevalence is higher among black males than white males by a ratio of 20:1. Usually the disease is localized to the chest, but urogenital involvement is found in 0.2% of clinically diagnosed cases and 5% of those diagnosed at necropsy.

The kidney is the most frequently affected urogenital organ, followed in men by the epididymis. Testicular sarcoidosis can present as a diffuse painless scrotal mass or can mimic acute epididymo-orchitis. Usually, it appears with systemic manifestations of the disease. Since it causes occlusion and fibrosis of the ductus epididymis, fertility may be affected. On ultrasound, the hypoechogenicity and ‘infiltrative’ pattern seen in the present case are recognized features.

Opinions differ on the need for histological proof, with reports of limited biopsy and frozen section, radical orchiectomy in unilateral disease and unilateral orchiectomy in bilateral disease. The peak incidence of sarcoidosis and testicular cancer coincide at 20–40 years and this is why most patients end up having an orchiectomy. However, testicular tumours are much more common in white men, with less than 3.5% of all testicular tumours being found in black men. These racial variations justify a more conservative approach in patients of Afro-Caribbean descent with proven sarcoidosis elsewhere. Careful follow-up and ultrasonic surveillance may be preferable in certain clinical settings to biopsy and surgery, especially in patients with bilateral testicular disease.

Two main approaches to genitourinary sarcoidosis have been proposed. Based on the marked relationship between testicular cancer and sarcoidosis, orchiectomy is recommended, even if evidence of sarcoidosis in other organs is present. By contrast, others consider immediate orchiectomy as being quite aggressive because of several factors associated with a benign diagnosis, as well as the involvement of the epididymis or vas deferens and bilateral testicular involvement. If the malignant diagnosis is established by exploration and intraoperative ultrasound-guided biopsy, orchiectomy is performed in cases of diffuse involvement of a testis. Spontaneous resolution has been reported in 50% to 70% of patients with active sarcoidosis. If the diagnosis is not established unequivocally, immunosuppressive agents (frequently steroids) will resolve the inflammation in patients who wish to salvage their fertility; and in those with severely advanced disease, after careful consideration.

A new approach has been proposed recently, based on the absence of evidence for malignant transformation in pathologically confirmed benign diagnosed testicular sarcoidosis, and it involves the open exploration of both testes, with resection of the largest lesion (on the right tunica). In this technique, the patient was not given steroids after the operation. Nevertheless, careful follow-up may be preferred to medication or surgery in certain clinical settings.
