= Epithelioid cell =

Characteristic cells of granulomatous hypersensitivity

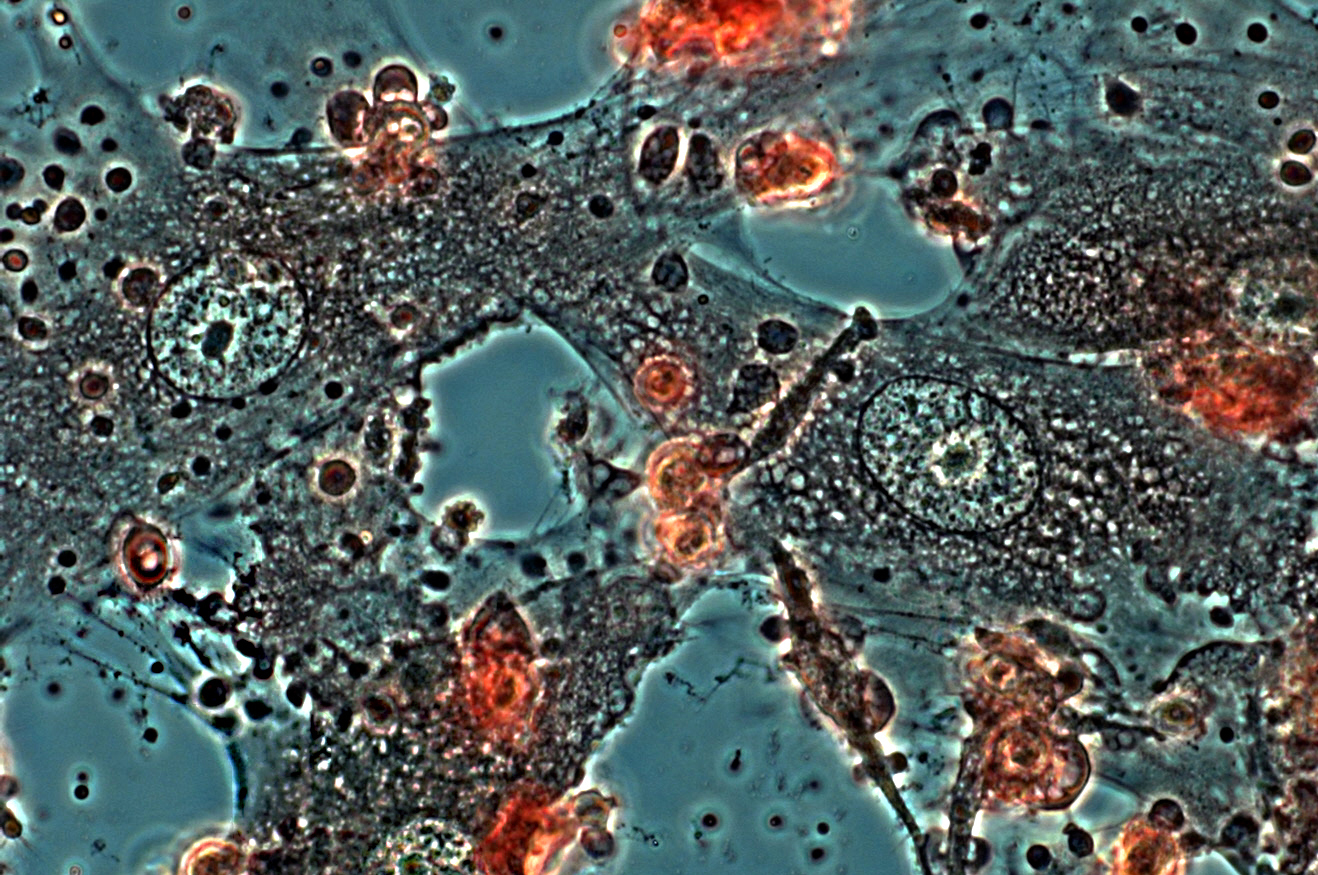
Epithelioid cells formed in culture of mouse peritoneal cells, stimulated by inactivated Mycobacterium tuberculosis, in a micro-chamber for lifetime observation; 14 days of cultivating. Numerous secretory granules are visible in the cytoplasm of cells. In the culture medium epithelioid cell granules and apoptotic bodies from macrophage are visible. Dystrophic altered macrophages are colored red. A method of interferential contrast in polarized light.

Epithelioid cells (also called epithelioid histiocytes) are derivatives of activated macrophages resembling epithelial cells.

== Structure and function ==
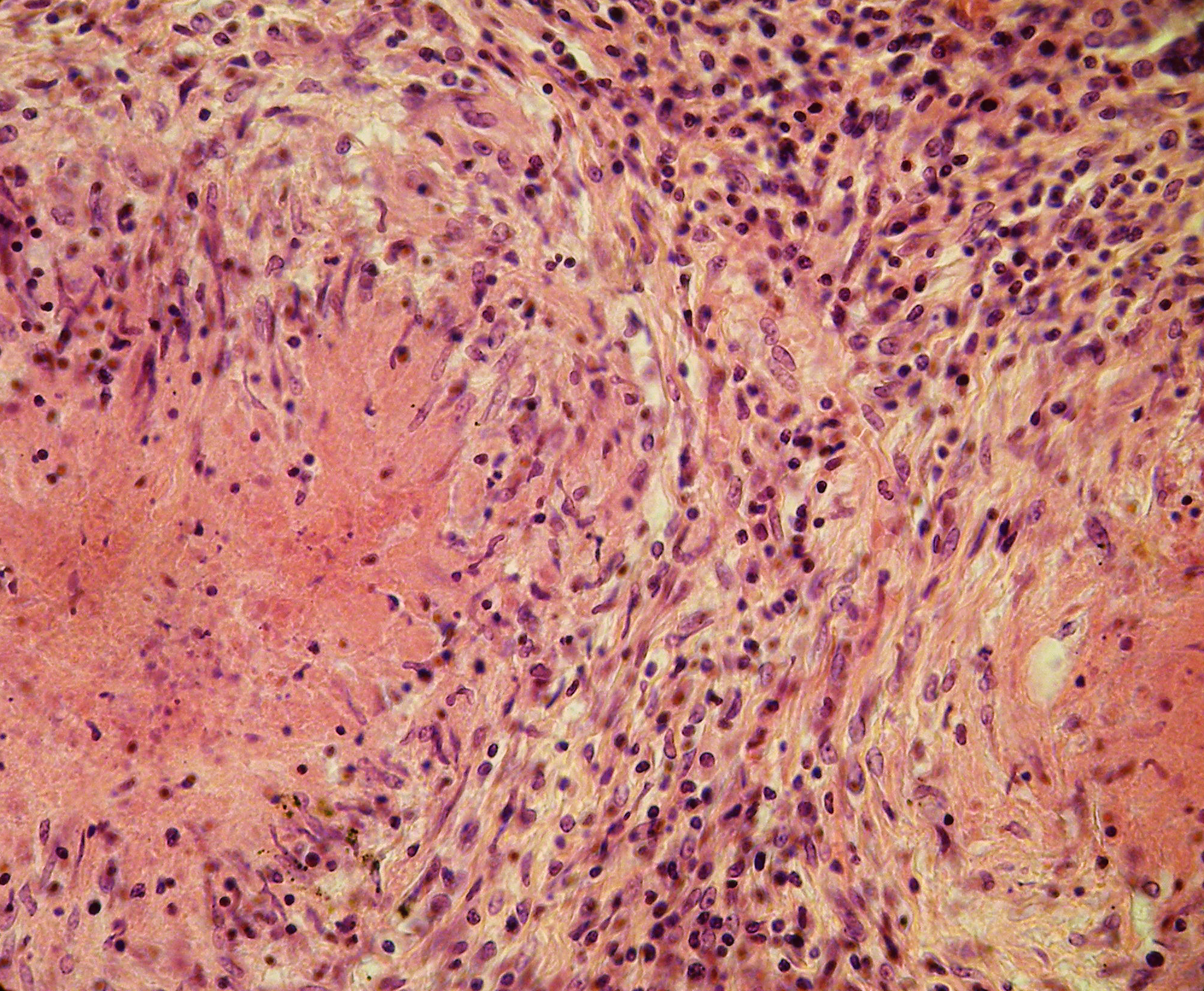
Epithelioid cells gather around the focus of necrosis, in direct contact with the necrotic masses, forming a kind of boundary zone.

Structurally, epithelioid cells (when examined by light microscopy after stained with hematoxylin and eosin), are elongated, with finely granular, pale eosinophilic (pink) cytoplasm, and central, ovoid nuclei (oval or elongate), which are less dense than that of a lymphocyte. They have indistinct shape and often appear to merge into one another, forming aggregates known as giant cells. When examined by transmission electron microscopy in epithelioid cells in the field of Golgi lamellar complex are taped not only zonated, but also sleek vesicles with dense center, and also great many (more than 100) large granulas with diameters up to 340 nm and with finegranular matrix more light than in macrophage granulas, sometimes with perigranular halo. In a Cell and Tissue Research article, "The most prominent feature of these cells is the enormous Golgi area; up to 6 individual stacks of Golgi cisternae may be present as well as a few bristle-coated and numerous smooth vesicles". Epithelioid cells have tightly interdigitated cell membranes in zipper-like arrays that link adjacent cells. These cells are central in the formation of granulomas, which are associated with many serious diseases. In granulomas, epithelioid cells perform the functions of delimiting.

== Peculiarities of the cytoskeleton ==
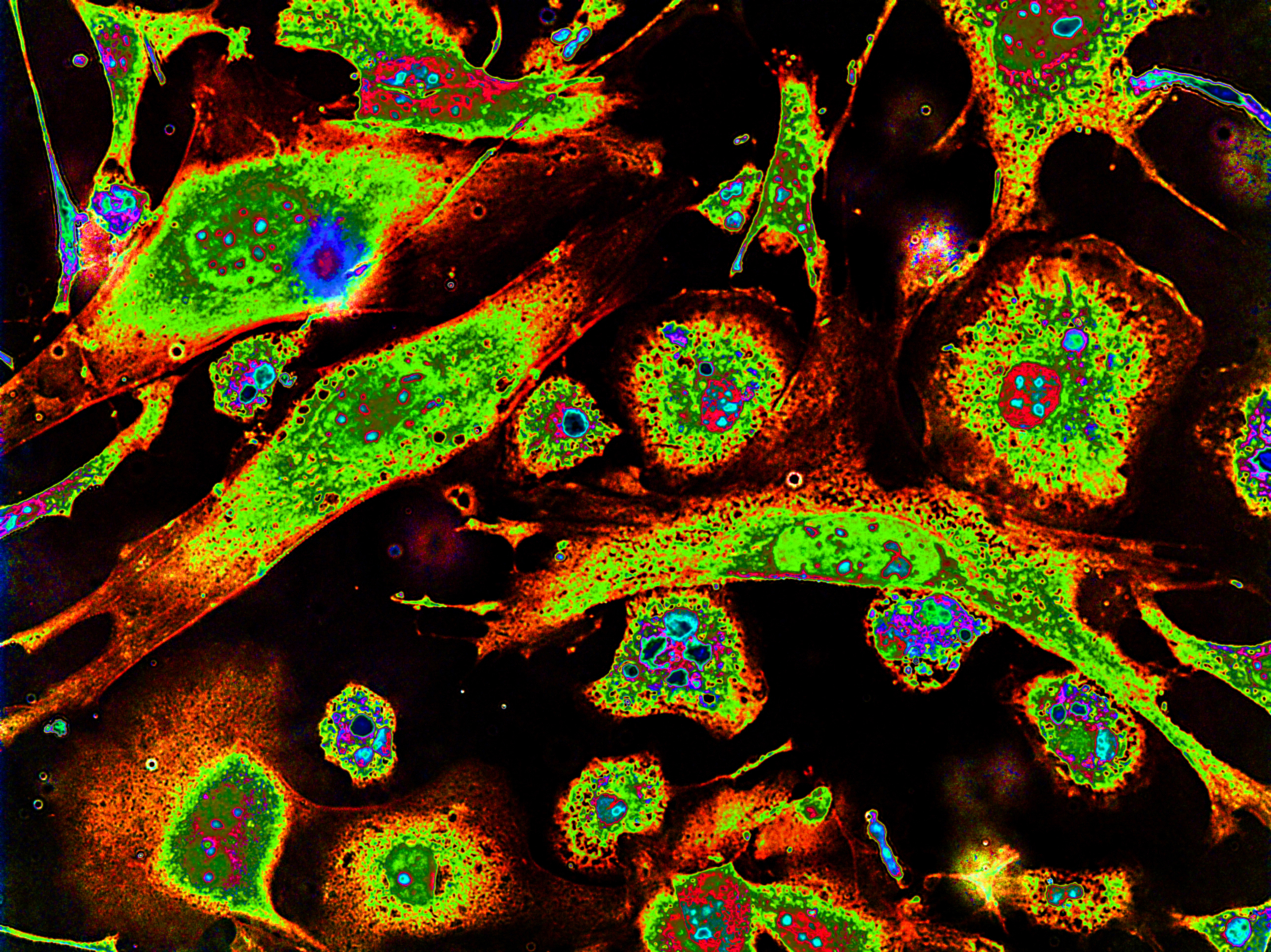
Epithelioid cells (polarized form, nucleus color - green) and macrophages (nucleus color – red) in peritoneal cell culture of mice, stimulated by inactivated Mycobacterium tuberculosis, on the 10th day of cultivation. The pseudo color image was obtained by color coding of different optical densities in a photo of cells, stained by Azure-Eosine. The shape of cells is determined by their cytoskeleton, and the color characterizes their different cytomorphology.

It is shown that the epithelioid cell cytoskeleton formed by filaments differs significantly from the macrophage cytoskeleton. A large increase in the number of filaments occurs in these cells, where filaments (90 to 100 A) surround the cytocentrum as a distinctive annular bundle often branching into the cytoplasm. Due to such cytoskeleton contiguous epithelioid cells display elaborate cytoplasmic interdigitation. By using the quick-freeze and freeze-substitution methods (prompt freezing, penetrating etching and freeze-substitution) it has been shown that the organizations three-dimensional metastructure cytoskeleton of the epithelioid cells, formed in the focus of granulomatous inflammation, more compatible to cytoskeleton characteristic of typical epithelial cell than to cytoskeleton of active and movable macrophages. It is exhibited that the dense webs of intermediate filaments, bound with cores, mitochondrions and other organelles, are supervised everywhere in cytoplasm of epithelioid cells. Some fascicles of actinic filaments were posed in filopodiums below than membranes of the cells. Exact interdigital tripling of membranes of cells between interfacing epithelioid cells were clearly demonstrated. Interdigital filopodiums were identified. The characteristic indication of epithelioid cells is their aggregation with formation tight interdigital triplings as a fastener "lightning", which, apparently, can have the important for the formation of a dense zone of delimitation of the body from the pathogen during the formation of epithelioid cell granulomas.

== Immunological phenotype and immunological markers ==
When using antibodies to the RFD9, RFD7 and HLA-DR antigens, it was found that all epithelioid cells have an immunological phenotype RFD9+/RFD7-/HLA-DR+. A series of monoclonal antibodies IHY-1, IHY-2, IHY-3 was obtained, which can be used to accurately identify epithelial cells formed in etiologically different forms of granulomatous inflammation. IHY-1 antibody reacts with epithelioid cells in sarcoid granulomas as well as with epithelioid cells of various granulomatous diseases including tuberculosis. The IHY-2 and IHY-3 monoclonal antibodies, react with epithelioid cells in sarcoidosis but not in tuberculosis.

== Clinical significance ==
Fragment of the outer edge zone of tuberculosis epithelioid cell granuloma. In the lower part – a layer of epithelioid cells, in which Langhans giant cell begins to form, as a result of the fusion of epithelioid cells. In it, we can notice the division of the cell nucleus of epithelioid cells, from which smaller nucleus are formed. Single pycnotic and apoptotically altered macrophages are found among epithelioid cells. Above the zone of epithelioid cells is a layer of fibroblasts that form a kind of "capsule". In the upper part – a layer of cells consisting of lymphocytes. The video shows the result of optical scanning (when using Phase-contrast microscopy) when changing the depth of field.

Epithelioid cells are an essential characteristic of epithelioid cell granulomas. Epithelioid cell granuloma can be defined as specifically and structurally organized collection of epithelioid cells, macrophages, lymphocytes and dendritic cells. Foreign-body granulomas may be considered an organized collection of macrophages, including mere collections of giant cells surrounding inert substances like suture material—the so-called non-immune granulomas.

Granuloma formation is associated with pathogens that have learned to evade the host immune system by various means like resisting phagocytosis and killing within the macrophages. Indigestibility of matter by macrophages is a common feature of granulomatous inflammation. Granulomas try to wall off these organisms and prevent their further growth and spread. Historically widespread and destructive diseases such as tuberculosis, leprosy and syphilis are granulomatous conditions. Granuloma formation is also the feature of many more contemporary conditions, like fungal infections, sarcoidosis and Crohn's disease.

== History of scientific research ==
The first mention of epithelioid cells as a specific cell form occurred in the 19th century in the works of Robert Koch and Victor André Cornil, who believed the leukocytes to be the originators of the epithelioid cells of tuberculosis. In experiments on rabbits, Alexandre Yersin (1888) and Amédée Borrel (1893) showed that epithelioid cells are formed from blood mononuclear leukocytes. The main patterns of epithelioid cell formation were first described in the first half of the 20th century by Lewis M. (1925). This researcher showed that blood monocytes in cell cultures of mixed blood leukocytes of Avian (taken from adult fowl as well as from embryos of various ages), mice, and humans, when cultured in vitro, are transformed into typical macrophages and epithelioid cells, followed by the formation of giant multinucleated cells. The formation of epithelioid-type cells was noted by Lewis M. on the second to third day of the cultivation of leukocytes. Later in a study of a similar plan, Jerry S. and Weiss L. (1966), when using cultures of mixed blood leukocytes of chicken (separated from cardiac blood of Rhode Island Red) and electron microscopy, showed that the transformation of monocytes of chicken in epithelioid cells begins in culture on three to four days and ends on five to six days. Since all previous researchers have indicated that epithelioid cells are formed from monocytes, and monocytes and macrophages were combined into a single mononuclear phagocyte system, Van Furth et al. (1972), referring to the work of Sutton J. and Weiss L. (1966), formally attributed epithelioid cells to the mononuclear phagocyte system. However, they did not specify exactly from which cells of the mononuclear phagocyte system epithelioid cells originate. At the same time, they came to the very cautious conclusion that "the epithelioid cells occurring in these lesions also arise from monocytes or macrophages." Adams D. (1976), believing that epithelioid cells are the final stage of cell differentiation of the cells of the mononuclear phagocyte system, formulated the concept of cytomorphogeesis of epithelioid cells according to which epithelioid cells are regarded as a derivative of activated macrophages (which is still held by most researchers at the present time). Не based on the assumption that "upon stimulation, macrophages mature further into immature epithelioid cells and ultimately into mature epithelioid cells." Rhee et al. (1979), in experiments on rats using the method of electron microscopy, showed that one of the main cytomorphological features of epithelioid cells that distinguish these cells from macrophages is the presence of characteristically specific granules in them, which they called epithelioid cell granules. Based on their own data, they supported the concept of epithelioid cell cytomorphogenesis, according to which epithelioid cells are regarded as a derivative of activated macrophages. Later, Turk JL and Narayanan RB (1982) proposed to distinguish two types of epithelioid cells in the study: vesicular and secretory epithelioid cells. It is suggested that vesicular epithelioid cells could develop from secretory epithelioid cells by a process of degeneration. In search of immunological mechanisms affecting the formation of epithelial cells, Cipriano et al. (2003) obtained data indicating the possible influence of IL-4 on the formation of a phenotype in macrophages that is similar to the phenotype of epithelioid cells. Not all the results of research devoted to the study of the laws and mechanisms of cytomorphogenesis of epithelioid cells fit into the concept of the origin of epithelioid cells from macrophages. Deimann J. and Fahimi H. (1980) showed that epithelioid cells in granulomas, induced in the rat liver by injection of glucan, beta-1,30-polyglucose, are formed not from Kupffer cells, mature differentiated macrophages, but from blood monocytes. De Vos et al. (1990) obtained the data that allowed them to suggest that in granulomatous inflammation foci and granulomatous lymphadenitis, epithelioid cells are formed not from differentiated macrophages but from so-called plasmacytoid monocytes (which have similarities with plasmacytes). This is further supported by the ultrastructural similarities between plasmacytoid monocytes and epithelioid cells. The present ultrastructural and immunoelectron microscopic study of epithelioid cell granulomas provides further arguments in favor of this hypothesis. Arkhipov S. (1997, 2012), using cultures of peritoneal cells, blood leukocytes, and bone marrow cells of mice, showed that macrophages and epithelioid cells are formed from different types of monocytes. It has been shown that epithelioid cells are formed only from plasmocytoid-type monocytes and have been named pre-epithelioid cells, bypassing the stage of differentiation into macrophages. It has been shown that in chronic inflammation, the number of pre-epithelioid monocytic cells committed to epithelioid cell differentiation increases in the focus of inflammation in the blood and bone marrow. Using mouse inbred lines, as opposed to susceptibility to Mycobacterium tuberculosis, it was shown that the numbers of pre-epithelioid monocytic cells, formed in chronic inflammation, are genetically determined. The obtained results showed that the morphogenesis of epithelioid cell granulomas can be determined by the different starting genetically determined levels of a pool of pre-epithelioid cells of monocytoid type, their flow in the center of granulomatous inflammation, the intensity of their differentiation into epithelioid cells, bypassing the stage of differentiation into macrophages, and their endomitotic activity.

== See also ==
- Epithelium
- Granuloma
