= Oscar von Schüppel =

German pathologist

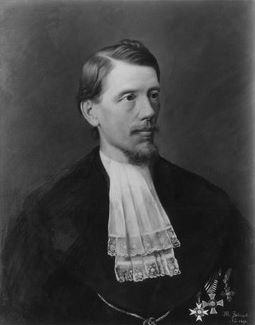
Oscar von Schüppel

Oscar von Schüppel (10 August 1837, near Dresden – 26 August 1881 in Bad Serneus, Switzerland) was a German pathologist.

He studied anatomy at the University of Leipzig, later relocating to Tübingen, where in 1869 he was appointed professor of pathological anatomy. In 1876/77 he served as university rector.

In 1871, he was the first scientist to describe "Schaumann bodies", structures that are defined as being cytoplasmic calcium inclusion bodies. He published his findings in a treatise on lymphatic tuberculosis, titled Untersuchungen über Lymphdrüsen-Tuberkulose sowie über die damit verwandten und verwechselten Drüsenkrankheiten (Studies on lymphatic tuberculosis, as well as its cognates and confused glandular diseases).

Another noteworthy effort by Schüppel was a book involving diseases of the biliary tract and the portal vein, Die Krankheiten der Gallenwege und der Pfortader (1880). It was included as part of Hugo von Ziemssen's textbook of special pathology and therapy.
