= Lupus pernio =

Hardened facial lesions due to sarcoidosis

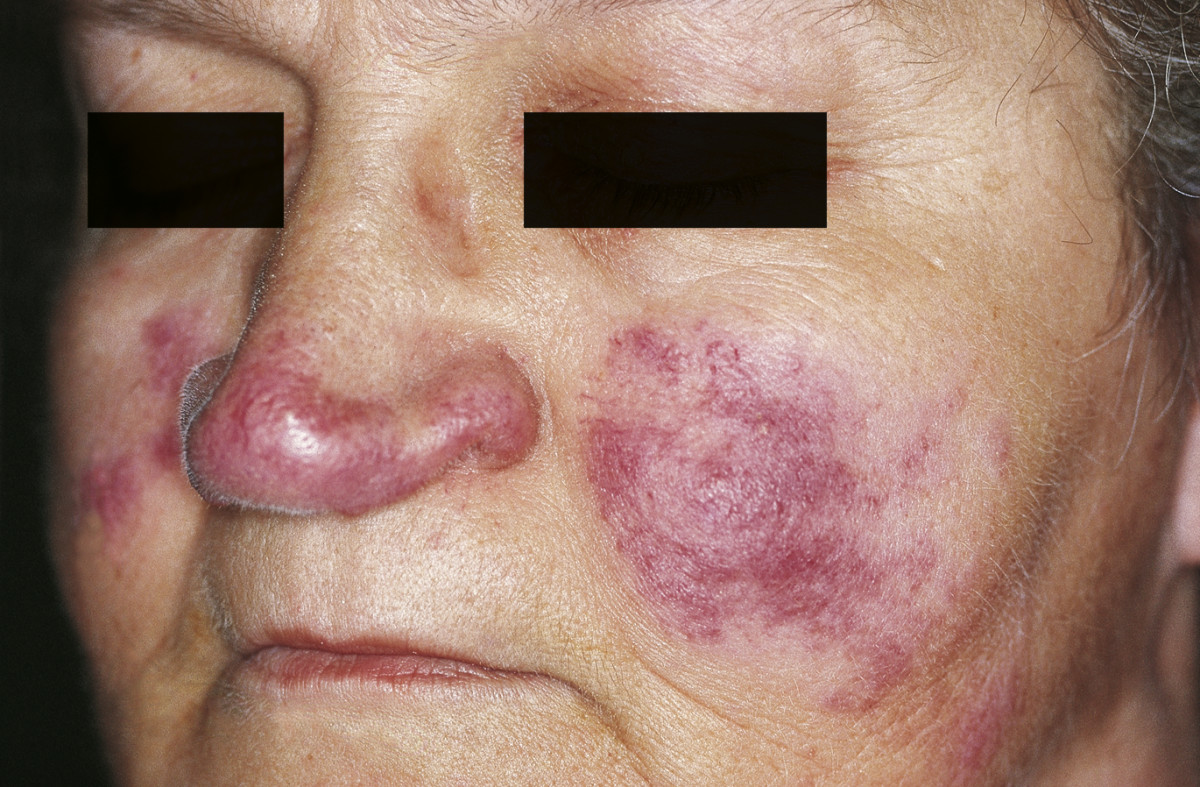
- Cutaneous lesions of sarcoidosis (lupus pernio). Red-to-purple indurated plaques and nodules affecting the nose and cheeks.
- Specialty: Dermatology

Lupus pernio is a chronic raised indurated (hardened) lesion of the skin, often purplish in color. It is seen on the nose, ears, cheeks, lips, and forehead. It is pathognomonic of sarcoidosis. The name "lupus pernio" is a misnomer, as microscopically this disease shows granulomatous infiltration and does not have features of either lupus nor pernio.

== Signs and symptoms ==
The hallmarks of lupus pernio are violaceous or erythematous, indurated plaques that are mostly found on the cheeks and nose in the center of the face. Rarely, lesions may also affect the dorsum of the hands and feet and the ears. The symptoms of lupus pernio range from a few tiny nodules on the nose to vibrant plaques that cover both cheeks. Lupus pernio lesions begin slowly but eventually penetrate and indurate into the underlying bone and cartilage, resulting in deformity. There is a higher chance of extracutaneous involvement, especially in the respiratory tract, in lupus pernio.

== Causes ==
The cause of cutaneous sarcoidosis is still not fully known. The generally acknowledged theory proposes that a complex interplay among genetic predisposition, immunological dysregulation, and environmental factors leads to sarcoidosis. It is believed that an augmented cell-mediated immune response to one or more undiscovered antigens is the cause of the granulomatous inflammation. Environmental exposure may have a role in the etiology of sarcoidosis, as evidenced by the development of granulomas that resemble sarcoid granulomas after exposure to metals such beryllium, zirconium, and aluminum. A number microorganisms have been suggested as potential etiologic agents of sarcoidosis, most notably mycobacteria and cutibacteria (previously propionibacteria).

== See also ==
- Sarcoidosis
- Skin manifestations of sarcoidosis
- List of cutaneous conditions
