= Heerfordt syndrome =

- Other names: Uveoparotid fever, Heerfordt–Mylius syndrome,
- Specialty: Angiology

Heerfordt syndrome is a rare manifestation of sarcoidosis. The symptoms include inflammation of the eye (uveitis), swelling of the parotid gland, chronic fever, and in some cases, palsy of the facial nerves.

== Causes ==
The exact cause of Heerfordt syndrome has not yet been definitively determined. Of those patients who have been diagnosed with Heerfordt syndrome, 15% have a close relative who also has the syndrome. One possible explanation is that the syndrome results from a combination of an environmental agent and a hereditary predisposition. Mycobacterium and Propionibacteria species have both been suggested as the environmental agent, though the evidence for this is inconclusive.

== Diagnosis ==
In patients that have already been diagnosed with sarcoidosis, Heerfordt syndrome can be inferred from the major symptoms of the syndrome, which include parotitis, fever, facial nerve palsy and anterior uveitis. In cases of parotitis, ultrasound-guided biopsy is used to exclude the possibility of lymphoma. There are many possible causes of facial nerve palsy, including Lyme disease, HIV, Melkersson–Rosenthal syndrome, schwannoma, and Bell's palsy. Heerfordt syndrome exhibits spontaneous remission.

== Treatment ==
Treatments for sarcoidosis include corticosteroids and immunosuppressive drugs.

== Prevalence ==
In the United States, sarcoidosis has a prevalence of approximately 10 cases per 100,000 whites and 36 cases per 100,000 blacks.Heerfordt syndrome is present in 4.1 to 5.6% of those with sarcoidosis.

== History ==
The condition was first described in 1909 by Danish ophthalmologist Christian Frederick Heerfordt, for whom the syndrome is now named.It was originally attributed to mumps, but after further studies by Swedish doctor Jan G. Waldenström in 1937, it was classified as a distinct manifestation of sarcoidosis.

== See also ==
- Darier–Roussy disease
- Sarcoidosis
- List of cutaneous conditions

== Notes ==
- Rapini, Ronald P.; Bolognia, Jean L.; Jorizzo, Joseph L. (2007). Dermatology: 2-Volume Set. St. Louis: Mosby. ISBN 978-1-4160-2999-1.
