= Asteroid body =

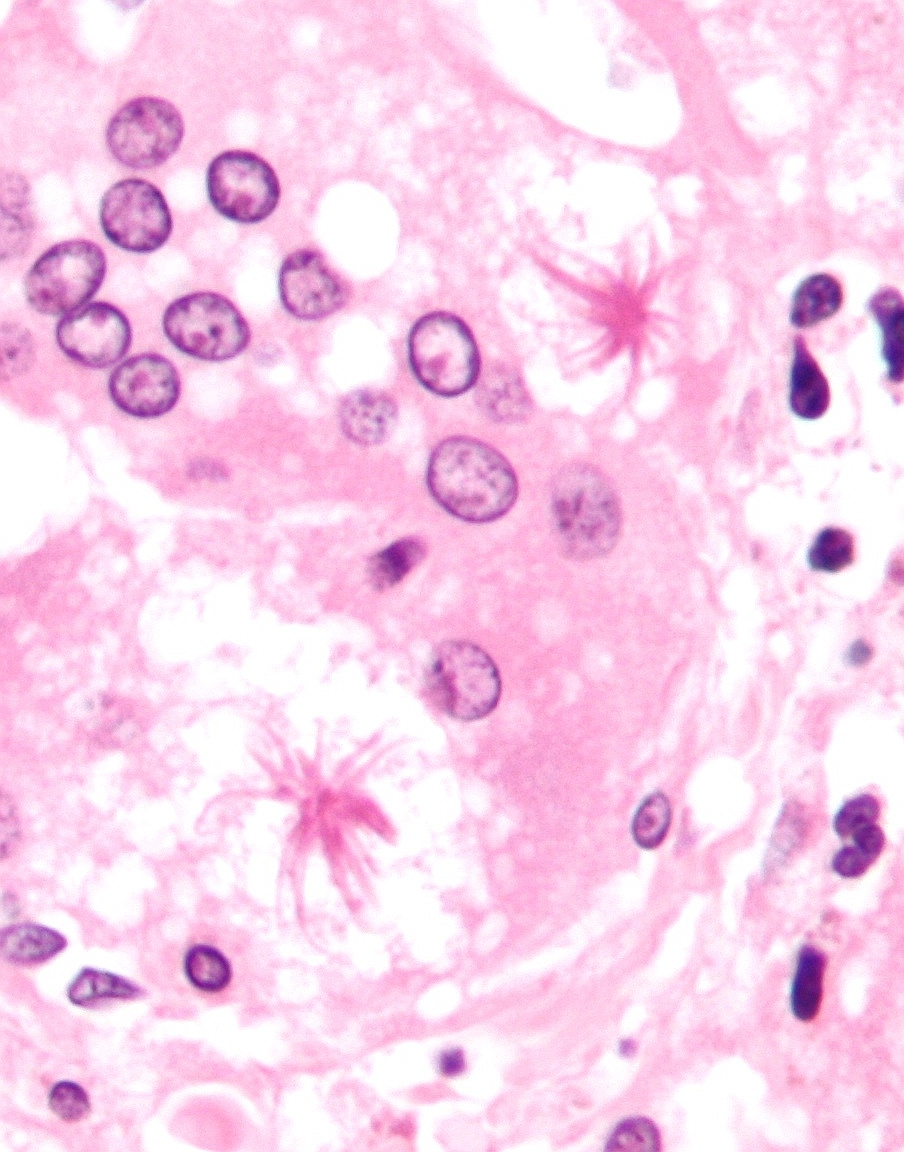
Two asteroid bodies. H&E stain.

An asteroid body is a microscopic finding seen within the giant cells of granulomas in diseases such as sarcoidosis and foreign-body giant cell reactions.

There is controversy about their composition. Traditionally, they were thought to be cytoskeletal elements and to consist primarily of vimentin. However, more recent research suggested that that was incorrect and that they may be composed of lipids arranged into bilayer membranes.

They were also once thought to be related to centrioles, an organelle involved in cell division in eukaryotes.

== See also ==
- Asteroid
- Centriole
- Schaumann body
- Granulomatous diseases
- Sarcoidosis

== Additional images ==
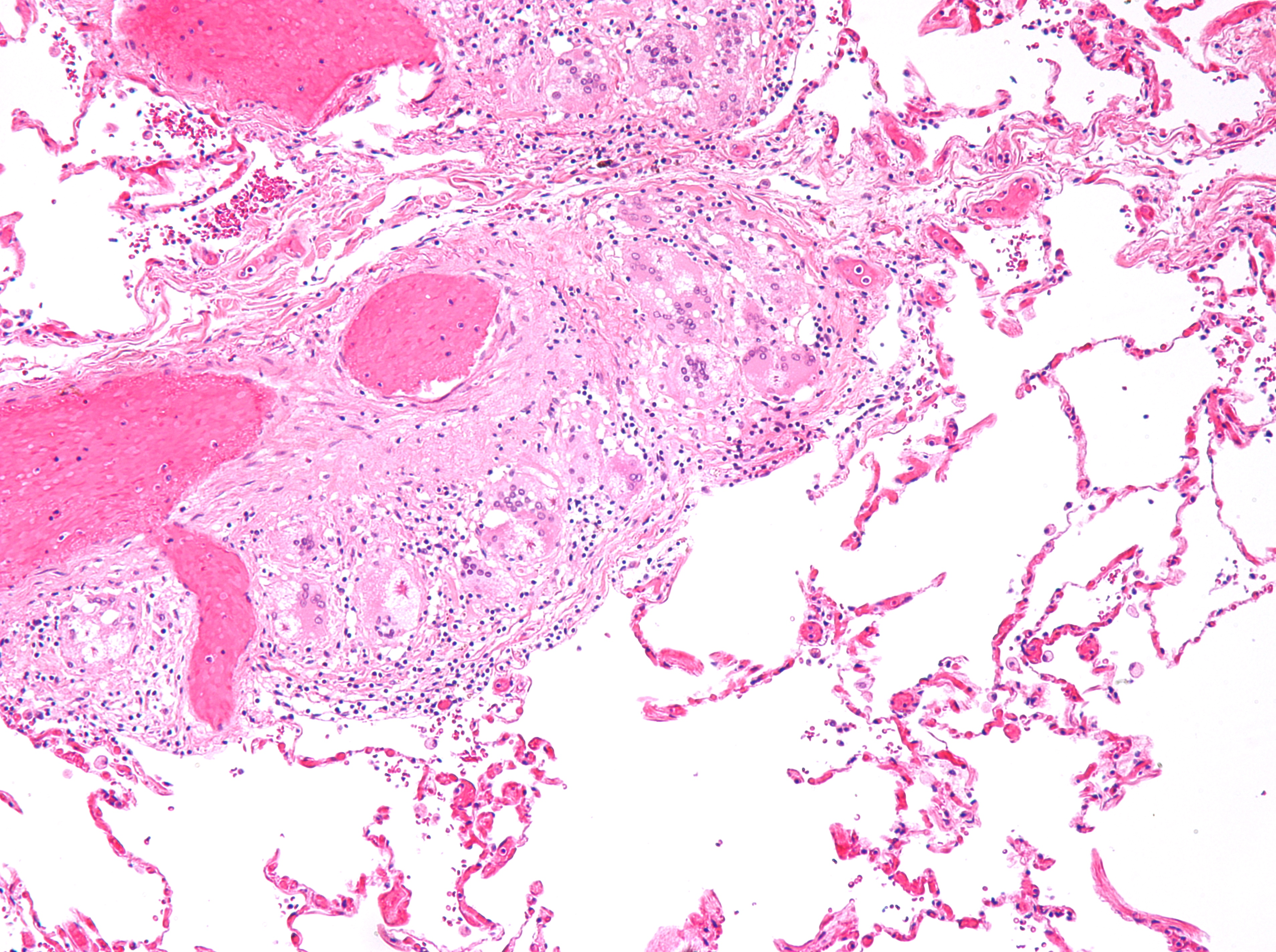
Micrograph of asteroid bodies in pulmonary sarcoidosis. H&E stain.

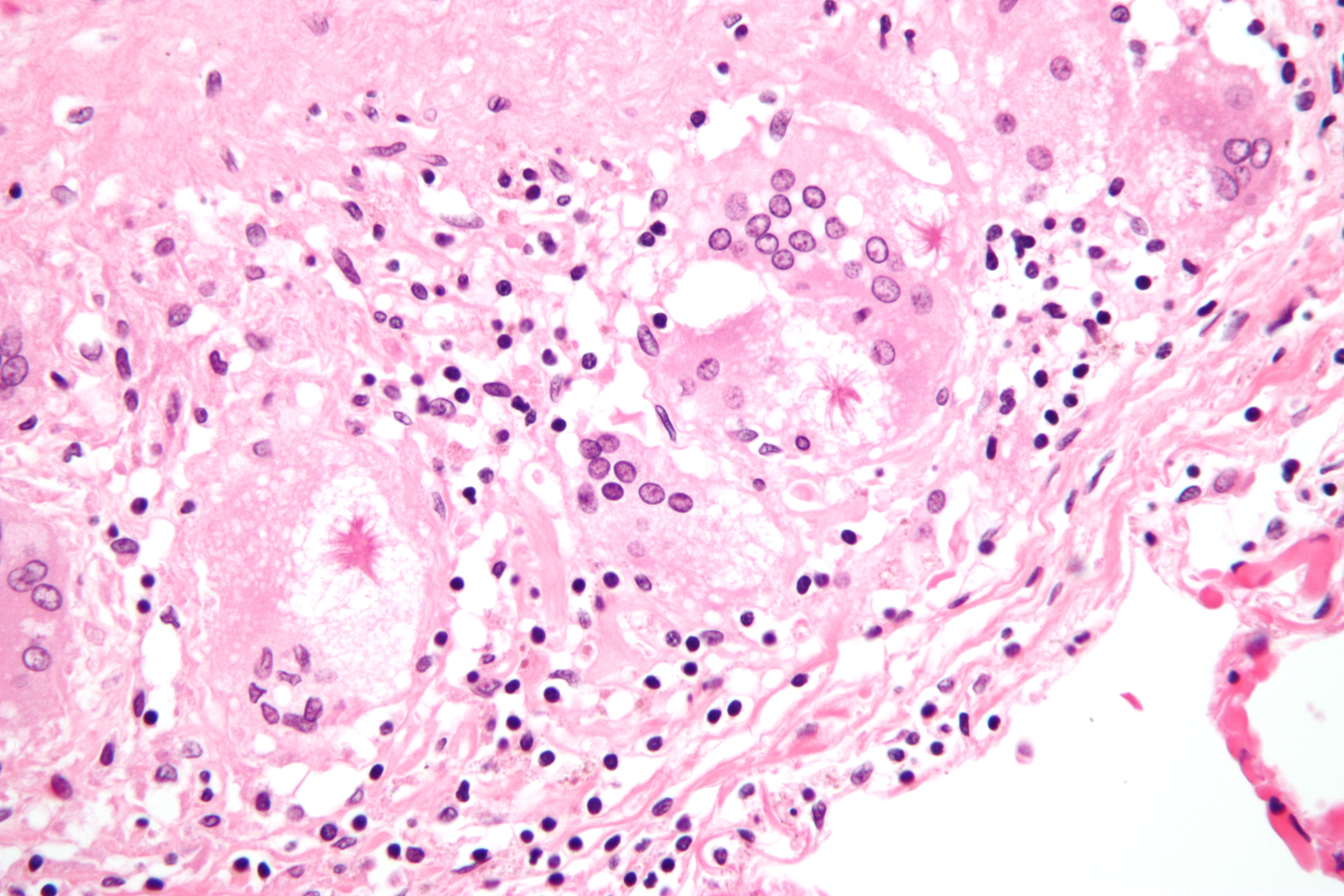
Micrograph of asteroid bodies in pulmonary sarcoidosis. H&E stain.

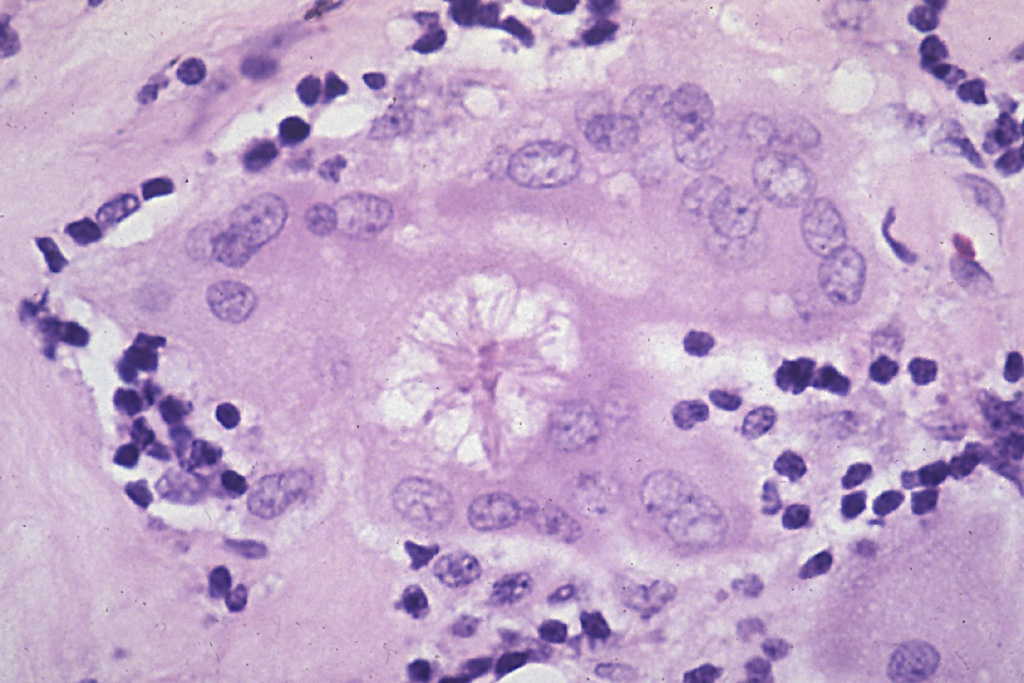
Asteroid body in sarcoidosis.
