= Jörgen Nielsen Schaumann =

Swedish dermatologist (1879–1953)

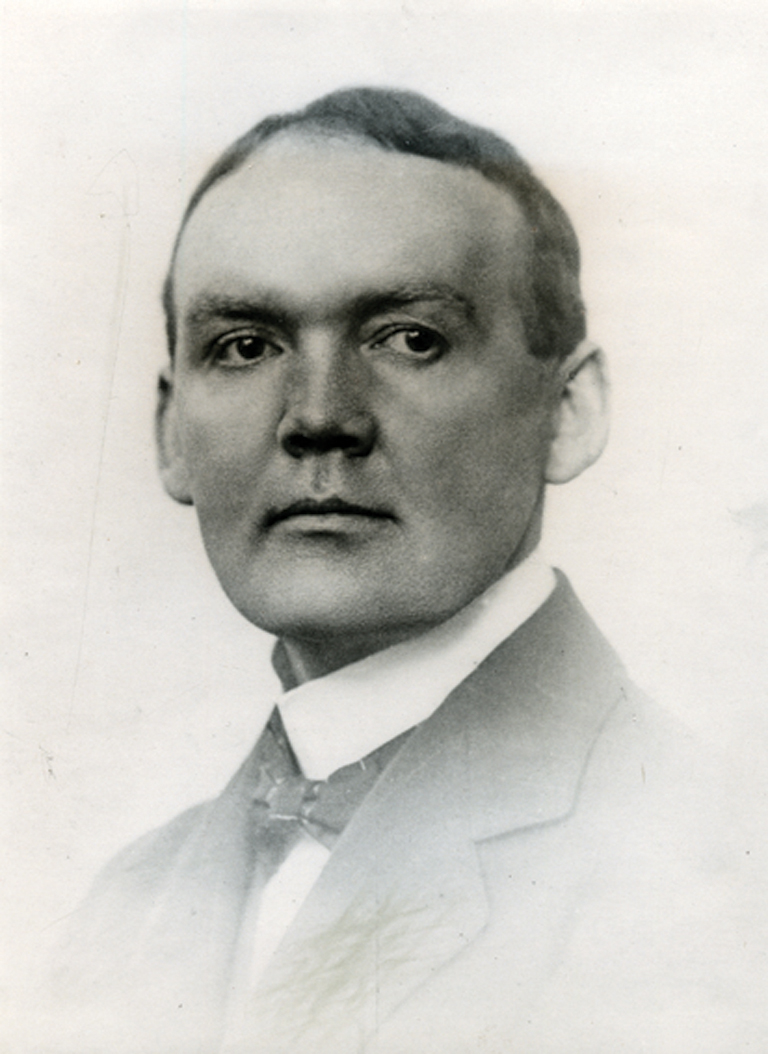
Jörgen Nielsen Schaumann

Jörgen Nielsen Schaumann (1879 – 1953) was a Swedish dermatologist.

He studied medicine at the University of Lund, obtaining his medicine license at Karolinska Institute in Stockholm in 1907. Subsequently, he performed dermatological duties at St. Göran's Hospital in Stockholm, and in 1912, began work as a physician at the Finsen institute also at St. Göran's Hospital in Stockholm, where he remained until retirement in 1946. In 1939 he received the title of professor.

Schaumann's name is associated with the Besnier-Boeck-Schaumann disease. In 1917 he published an article on the disease, from which the systemic nature of the disease came to be realized by the medical community. His name is also lent to Schaumann bodies, which are calcium-containing inclusion bodies found in the cytoplasm of giant cells in sarcoidosis and berylliosis. Schaumann bodies were initially described in 1871 by Oscar von Schüppel (1837-1881), a pathologist at the University of Tübingen. Following retirement, Schaumann conducted research involving new aspects of benign lymphogranulomatosis.

Schaumann was an accomplished artist, whose paintings and sculptures adorned several locations in Stockholm. In 1946 he became an honorary doctor at the University of Paris, and during the following year, he became a corresponding member of the Académie Nationale de Médecine.

== Written works ==
- Recherches sur le lupus pernio et ses relations avec les sarcoides cutanées et sous-cutanées, (paper on Boeck's sarcoid). Nordiskt medicinskt Arkiv, Stockholm, 1917, avd. II, nr. 17: 1-81.
- Étude sur le lupus pernio et ses rapports avec sarcoïdes et la tuberculose, in Annales de dermatologie et de syphilographie, Paris, 1917, 5 sér., 6: 357–373.
- Le lupus pernio et les sarcoides au point de vue étiologique, Acta Dermato-Venereologica, Stockholm, 1923: 679–696.
- Sur le lupus pernio, mémoire présenté en Novembre 1914 à la Société française de Dermatologie et de Syphiligraphie pour le Prix Zambaco, Stockholm 1934.
