= Langhans giant cell =

Cell type

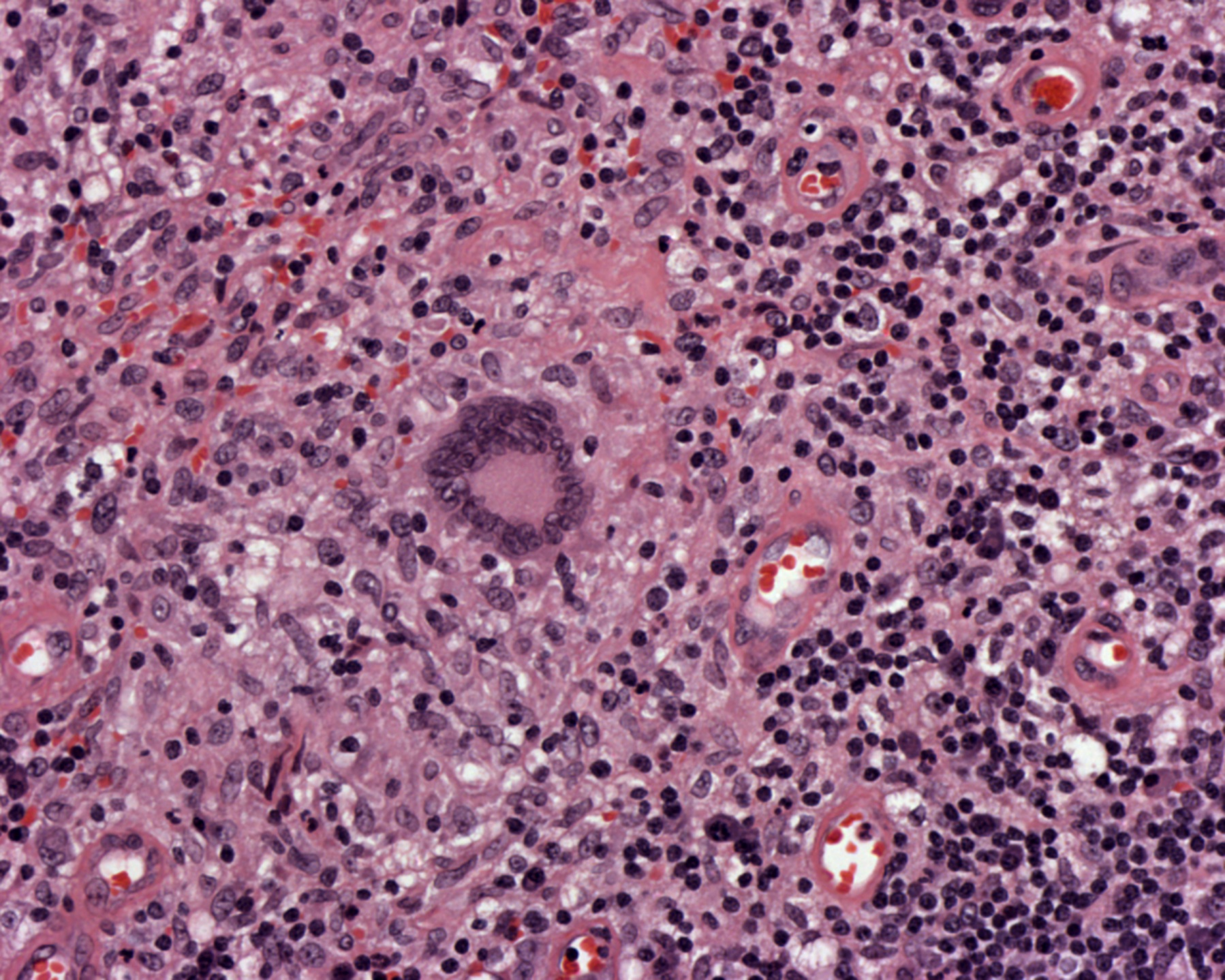
Granulation tissue with a poorly formed granuloma to the left of centre. Within this area there is a multinucleate giant cell of the Langhans type. The patient had a healing mycobacterial infection of the skin (Mycobacterium ulcerans infection).

Langhans giant cells (LGC) are giant cells found in granulomatous conditions.

They are formed by the fusion of epithelioid cells (macrophages), and contain nuclei arranged in a horseshoe-shaped pattern in the cell periphery.

Although traditionally their presence was associated with tuberculosis, they are not specific for tuberculosis or even for mycobacterial disease. In fact, they are found in nearly every form of granulomatous disease, regardless of etiology.

== Terminology ==
Langhans giant cells are named after Theodor Langhans (1839–1915), a German pathologist.

== Causes ==
In 2012, a research paper showed that when activated CD4+ T cells and monocytes are in close contact, interaction of CD40-CD40L between these two cells and subsequent IFNγ secretion by the T cells causes upregulation and secretion of fusion-related molecule DC-STAMP (dendritic cell-specific transmembrane protein) by the monocytes, which results in LGC formation.

== Clinical significance ==
Langhans giant cells are often found in transbronchial lung biopsies or lymph node biopsies in patients with sarcoidosis. They are also commonly found in tuberculous granulomas of tuberculosis.
