= Schaumann body =

Pathological finding in microscopy

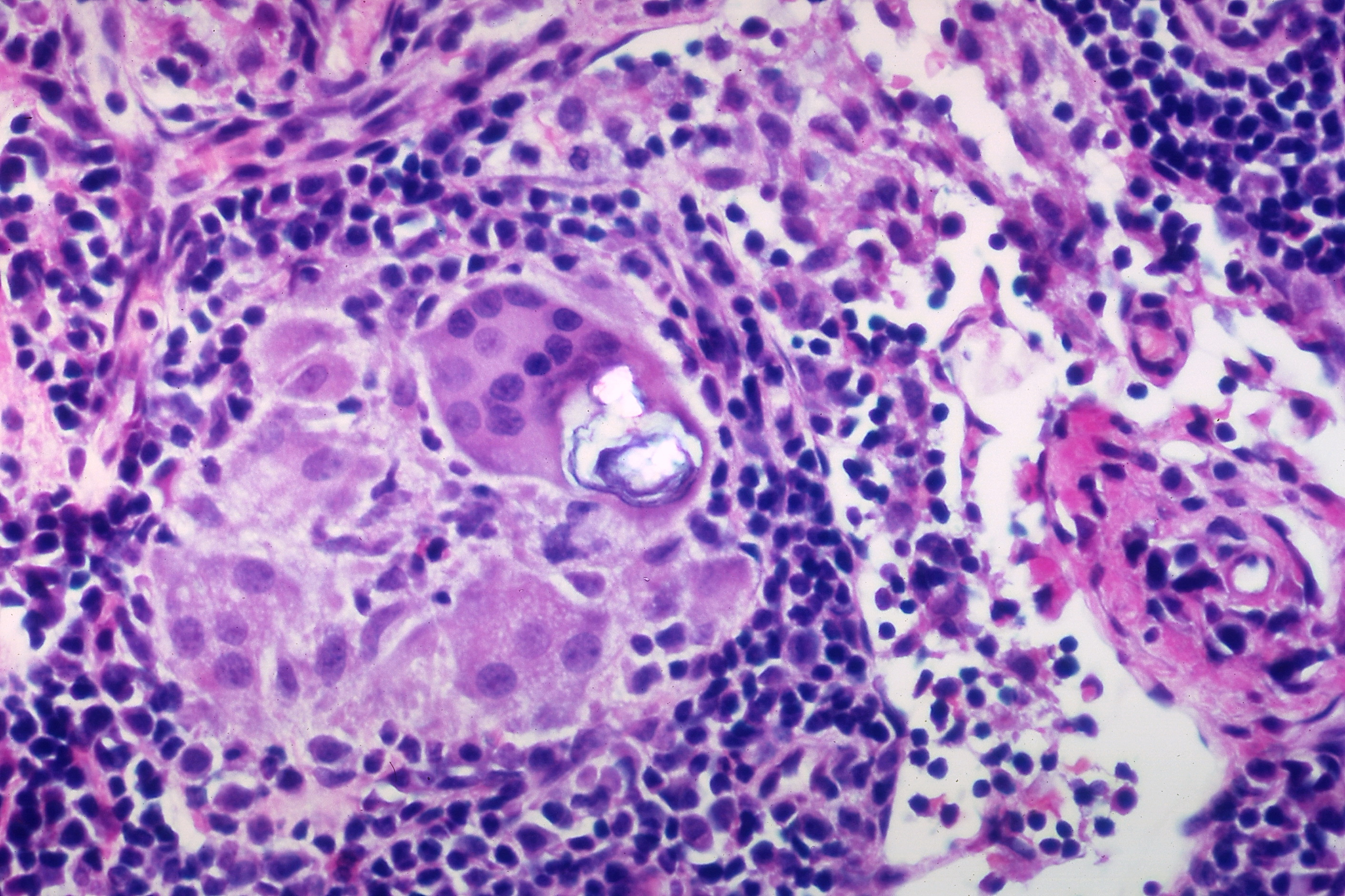
Crystalline inclusion with developing Schaumann body, polarized, in sarcoidosis

In pathology, Schaumann bodies are calcium and protein inclusions inside of Langhans giant cells as part of a granuloma.

Many conditions can cause Schaumann bodies, including:

- Sarcoidosis,
- Hypersensitivity pneumonitis, and
- Berylliosis.
- uncommonly, Crohn's disease and tuberculosis.

== Etymology ==
These inclusions were named after Swedish dermatologist Jörgen Nilsen Schaumann.

== See also ==
- Asteroid body
