= Bilateral hilar lymphadenopathy =

Disease of the lymph nodes

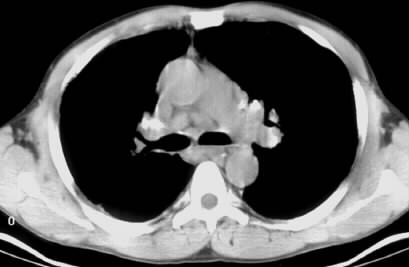
CT scan of the chest showing bilateral lymphadenopathy in the mediastinum due to sarcoidosis.

Bilateral hilar lymphadenopathy is a bilateral enlargement of the lymph nodes of pulmonary hila. It is a radiographic term for the enlargement of mediastinal lymph nodes and is most commonly identified by a chest x-ray.

== Causes ==
The following are causes of BHL:

- Sarcoidosis
- Infection
  - Tuberculosis
  - Fungal infection
  - Mycoplasma
  - Intestinal Lipodystrophy (Whipple's disease)
- Malignancy
  - Lymphoma
  - Carcinoma
  - Mediastinal tumors
- Inorganic dust disease
  - Silicosis
  - Berylliosis
- Extrinsic allergic alveolitis
  - Such as bird fancier's lung
- Less common causes also exist:
  - Eosinophilic granulomatosis with polyangiitis
  - Human immunodeficiency virus
  - Extrinsic allergic alveolitis
  - Adult-onset Still's disease
