= Skin manifestations of sarcoidosis =

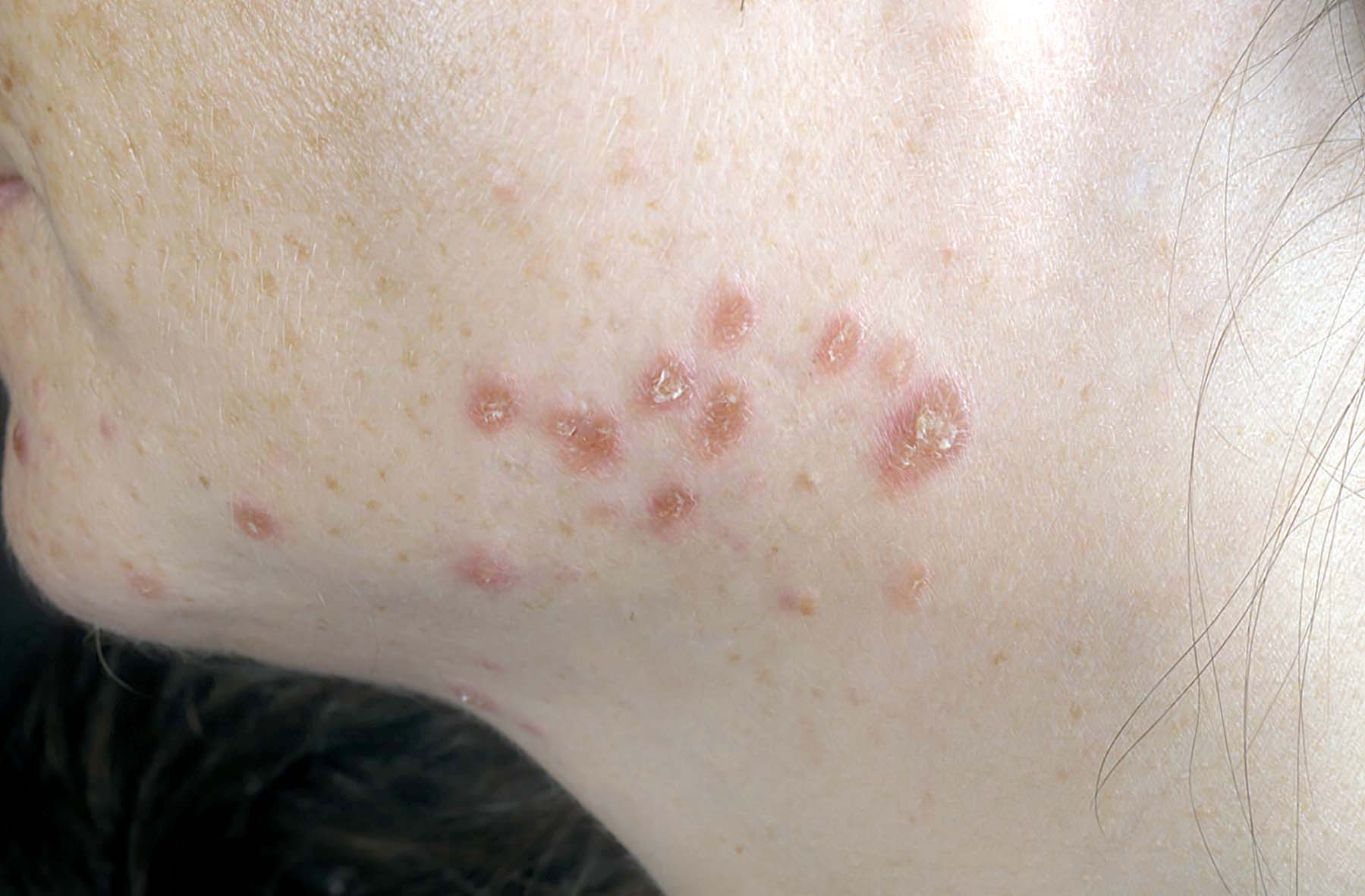
- A rash on the cheek of a person with sarcoidosis
- Specialty: Hematology
- Complications: Skin ulcers, infection

Sarcoidosis, an inflammatory disease, involves the skin in about 25% of patients. The most common lesions are erythema nodosum, plaques, maculopapular eruptions, subcutaneous nodules, and lupus pernio. Treatment is not required, since the lesions usually resolve spontaneously in two to four weeks. Although it may be disfiguring, cutaneous sarcoidosis rarely causes major problems.

== Classification ==
=== Morphology ===
Ulcerative sarcoidosis is a cutaneous condition affecting roughly 5% of people with sarcoidosis.

Annular sarcoidosis is a cutaneous condition characterized by papular skin lesions arranged in annular patterns, usually with a red-brown hue.

=== Pattern ===
Morpheaform sarcoidosis is a very rare cutaneous condition characterized by specific cutaneous skin lesions of sarcoidosis accompanied by substantial fibrosis, simulating morphea.

Erythrodermic sarcoidosis is a cutaneous condition and very rare form of sarcoidosis.

Hypopigmented sarcoidosis is a cutaneous condition characterized by areas of hypopigmented skin. It is usually diagnosed in darkly pigmented races and may be the earliest sign of sarcoidosis.

Papular sarcoid is a cutaneous condition characterized by papules, which are the most common morphology of cutaneous sarcoidosis.

Ichthyosiform sarcoidosis is a cutaneous condition resembling ichthyosis vulgaris or acquired ichthyosis, with fine scaling usually on the distal extremities, by caused by sarcoidosis.

=== Location ===
Subcutaneous sarcoidosis (also known as "Darier–Roussy disease" and "Darier-Roussy sarcoid") is a cutaneous condition characterized by numerous 0.5- to 0.3-cm deep-seated nodules on the trunk and extremities.

Scar sarcoid (also known as "Sarcoidosis in scars") is a cutaneous condition characterized by infiltration and elevation of tattoos and old flat scars due to sarcoidosis.

Mucosal sarcoidosis is a cutaneous condition characterized by pinhead-sized papules that may be grouped and fused together to form a flat plaque.

Erythrodermic sarcoidosis is a cutaneous condition and very rare form of sarcoidosis.
