= Evgeni Orkin =

Ukrainian composer (born 1977)

Evgeni Orkin Євген Оркін
- Born: 2 October 1977 (age 49); Lviv, Ukrainian SSR
- Education: Kyiv Conservatoire; Musikhochschule Mannheim
- Occupations: composer; clarinetist; saxophonist; conductor; author
- Organizations: Kyiv Camerata; Musikhochschule Mannheim
- Website: www.evgeniorkin.de

Evgeni Orkin (Євген Оркін, born 2 October 1977) is a Ukrainian composer, clarinetist, saxophonist, conductor and author, who is based in Germany.

== Life and career ==
Born in Lviv, then in the Ukrainian SSR, Orkin studied first at the Ukrainian National Tchaikovsky Academy of Music, clarinet with I. Pendischuk and composition with Yevhen Stankovych. He studied further in Utrecht and at the Musikhochschule Mannheim, clarinet with Herman Braune and Wolfhard Pencz, conducting with Melvin Margolis and composition with Ulrich Leyendecker and Ernst Bechert.

Orkin played as principal clarinet in the ensemble of the Kyiv Camerata from 1992 to 1999. He was a co-founder of the project Open-Lift for contemporary music in Utrecht and co-founder, clarinetist and saxophonist of the ensemble Komponistenverschwörung,. a member of the ensemble TEMA in Karlsruhe, and a co-founder and player of the Dorado Quintet.

He has played in world premieres, in works by composers such as Ernst Bechert, Nuno Corte-Real, Stephan Marc Schneider, Stefan Schulzki, Valentin Silvestrov, Yevhen Stankovych and Martin Wistinghausen.

Orkin composed ten chamber symphonies, seven symphonies, concertos, among others, for violin, piano, saxophone and clarinet, an opera Magister Ludi after Hermann Hesse, several works of musical theatre, and chamber music. His works were performed at international festivals, including Vienna Festival, Young Euro Classic, Kunstfest Weimar, Lucerne Festival, „Un Week-end à l’Est“ in Paris, Kontrasty in Lviv, the Kyiv Music Fest, a festival of new music in Odesa, Heidelberger Frühling, Bodenseefestival, ZeitGenuss in Karlsruhe, Menuhin Festival Gstaad, Wachenheimer Serenaden, and LvivMozArt. His works are published by Universal Edition, Accolade, Konsid und Are Musikverlag.

His chamber opera Das Märchen der Waldkönigin Ach sets a Ukrainian fairy tale; it was premiered at the small Wartburg stage of the Staatstheater Wiesbaden in October 2023. His Odessa Rhapsody was awarded the European Music Prize from the mayor of Berlin in 2023. It was premiered in Paris, and he received the prize when the German premiere was played at the Konzerthaus Berlin as part of Young Euro Classic by the Youth Symphony Orchestra of Ukraine conducted by Oksana Lyniv to whom he had dedicated the work.

In 2010 he founded the label OML. He published an educational book about playing historic clarinets in 2017, Methodische Einführung in das Erlernen und die Anwendung der historischen Klarinette, translated in German, English and Ukrainian.

Orkin lectures at the Hochschule für Musik und Darstellende Kunst Mannheim.

== Awards ==
- 1999: Prize from the President of Ukraine (for his First Symphony "Parade of the Planets")
- 2001: Scholarship from Lions Club Mannheim (for Jüdische Suite for clarinet)
- 2004: First prize of the second Festival of the Jewish World Congress in composition
- 2005: First prize of the competition by the Goethe Institute Mannheim, "Schiller vs Goethe" for the best setting of a text by Schiller
- European Composition Prize 2023 for "Odesa Rhapsody" for two violins and orchestra

== Works ==
- op. 1: Sonatine for clarinet
- op. 2: Quintet for draughts
- op. 3: Gamayoune
- op. 4: Chamber symphony No. 1 „The Harbours“
- op. 5: Variations for piano
- op. 6: Partita da Piazzolla (Versions for solo violine, clarinet, 2 violins, viola, cello and double-bass as well for clarinet, violin, cello and piano)
- op. 7: The Mirror (chamber concerto for piano and strings)
- op. 8: Talisman (Poem for soprano and strings on a poem by Alexander Pushkin)
- op. 9: Symphony/Ballet No. 1 „Parade of the Planets“ for orchestra
- op. 10: Jewish Suite for solo clarinet
- op. 11: Suite for string orchestra
- op. 12: Rhapsody for solo oboe
- op. 13: Chamber symphony No. 2 for cello und strings
- op. 14: Mosaiks (Versions for solo piano und for piano four hands)
- op. 15: Violin concerto
- op. 16: Chamber symphony No. 3 (Double Concerto for violin und cello with strings, percussion, celesta and harpsichord)
- op. 17: Konzertstueck for piano with orchestra
- op. 18: The Rain Songs for soprano, clarinet and piano
- op. 19: Four Songs on Ossip Mandelstam (versions for sopran and guitar and for sopran and strings)
- op. 20: String quartet No. 1
- op. 21: Die Schatten (Suite for clarinet and guitar)
- op. 22: Sinfonia brevis No. 1
- op. 23: Symphony No. 2
- op. 24: Sonatina for piano
- op. 25: Quartet for clarinet, violin, cello and piano
- op. 26: Wohin segelt das Schiff? (two poems by Friedrich Schiller) for voice and piano
- op. 27: Cogito ergo sum (Singspiel after Friedrich Schiller’s Xenien from the „Musen-Almanach für das Jahr 1797“)
- op. 28: Three Musicians (Hommage to Pablo Picasso) for flute, bassoon and piano
- op. 29: Symphoniy No. 3 „The Master and Margarita“ (free after Mikhail Bulgakov)
- op. 30: Chamber symphony No. 4
- op. 31: Four Miniatures for french horn and piano
- op. 32: Six Bagatelles for violin, cello and piano
- op. 33: Un Ange qui ... for clarinet and organ
- op. 34: Los Caprichos for bassoon/contrabassoon and piano
- op. 35: Chamber symphony No. 5 „Le Caprice“ for strings
- op. 36: Las Meninas for flute and piano
- op. 37: Eine kleine Hochzeitskantate
- op. 38: Three Graphics for violin and piano
- op. 39: Concerto for soprano saxophone and orchestra
- op. 40: Graphomania 2 for orchestra
- op. 41: Chamber symphony No. 6 „Winterschlaf“ for mezzo-soprano, choir and chamber orchestra
- op. 42: Wizzard (versions for clarinet and piano and for clarinet and sound sample)
- op. 43: Clarinet quintet for clarinet and string quartet
- op. 44: Meditation for clarinet and sound sample
- op. 45: Chamber symphony No. 7 for female voice and chamber orchestra
- op. 46: Escher-Etudes for three grand pianos in room
- op. 47: Lullaby for mezzo-soprano, clarinet, violin and piano
- op. 48: Missa Homoptera for clarinet and sound sample
- op. 49: Ganz im Sinne des Tangos ... for saxophone quartet
- op. 50: Klanjobox Antique for clarinet, bastard banjo and live electronics
- op. 51: Hommages à Carl Nielsen, Jean Françaix, Olivier Messiaen, Igor Strawinsky, George Gershwin, Benny Goodman, Astor Piazzolla for solo clarinet (Nos. 1–6) or rather for five clarinets (No. 7)
- op. 52: Vosaduli for brass quintet
- op. 53: Symphony No. 4 „Haiku“ for orchestra
- op. 54: Martini Blue for voice, alto-saxophone, trombone, banjo, bass guitar, piano and live electronics
- op. 55: Chamber symphony No. 8 „Windrose“ for oboe, clarinet, bassoon, french horn, percussion and strings
- op. 56: Concerto d’oro (versions for alto-saxophone with big band and for alto-saxophone with concert band)
- op. 57: Die Neun Musen for solo violin
- op. 58: Symphony No. 5 „Jewish“ for orchestra
- op. 59: Tandem-Toccata for two violins
- op. 60: Two Pieces for shakuhachi and piano
- op. 61: Quintet for two violins, viola, cello and piano
- op. 62: Magister Ludi (Opera in six acts after Hermann Hesse)
- op. 63: Speaking choir A „Kalaschnikow ist tot“
- op. 64: Profundus for bass clarinet and sound sample
- op. 65: Chamber symphony No. 9 „Olimpia“ for two alto-saxophones, flute, violin, cello, percussion and piano
- op. 66: Symphony No. 6 „Maidan“
- op. 67: Songs after poems by Franz Kafka for voice and piano
- op. 68: „Der Schummeltrompeter“ free on motives from Struwwelpeter for narrator and small ensemble
- op. 69: Adagio for clarinet (also for soprano-saxophone and wind controller) and orchestra
- op. 70: „Odem“ (version for two solo violas and strings)
- op. 71: Chamber symphony No. 10 „Sprich mit mir“ for voice, violin and chamber orchestra
- op. 72: b.) „Echo“ for clarinet, sound sample and two narrators
- op. 73: „In Wiederkehr der Masken“ (versions for clarinet and chamber orchestra, for clarinet and wind orchestra)
- op. 74: „Und wie der Pan gähnt...“ for overtone singer and small ensemble
- op. 75: „Annes Passion“ Oratorium for narrator, soloists, choir and orchestra after texts by Anne Frank
- op. 76: Theobald Lieder for voice and piano
- op. 77: „3 Mahngesänge“ for clarinet and strings
- op. 78: „3 Valses“ for orchestra
- op. 79: Violin concerto No. 2
- op. 80: String quartet No. 2
- op. 81: „Halytska overture“ for orchestra
- op. 82: „Mizmor“ for klezmer band, cantor and string orchestra
- op. 83: „Odesa Rhapsody“ for two violins and orchestra
- op. 84: „Nachtgebet“ for orchestra
- op. 85: „Tatusewa Knyha“ cantata for narrator, soloists, children choir and orchestra
- op. 86: „Rechtzeitig“ for chamber ensemble
- op. 87: Grand Trio Concertant for clarinet, violin and piano
- op. 88: „Todesfuge“ for violin, narrator and orchestra
- op. 89: Symphony No. 7 „Das hohe Schloss“
- op. 90: „Requiem for a Poet“ for bariton, sampler and orchestra
- op. 91: „Elegy“ for orchestra
- op. 92: „Fünf unterbrochene Wiegenlieder“ for orchestra
- op. 93: „Odradek“ concerto for viola and string orchestra
- op. 94: „Mendele-Lohengrin“ clezmer singspiel for narrator, soprano and chamber orchestra
- op. 95: „Radetzkymarsch“ for clarinet (also bass clarinet), narrator and orchestra
- op. 96: „Briefe aus dem Schatten“ for soloists, choir and orchestra
