= Brutscher =

Brutscher is a surname. Notable people with the surname include:

- Markus Brutscher (born 1966), German tenor
- Toni Brutscher (1925–1983), West German ski jumper
