= Orkin (surname) =

Orkin Oркин (masculine), or Orkina Oркина (feminine) is a Russian and Eastern Yiddish surname that is likely an eastern variant of Arkin, but is not always a Jewish Surname. Notable people with the surname include:

- Chloe Orkin, British physician
- Dick Orkin (1933–2017), American voice actor and radio producer
- Élodie Grace Orkin (born 2004), British-American actress
- Evgeni Orkin (born 1977), Ukrainian composer
- Ivan Orkin, owner of Ivan Ramen
- Ruth Orkin (1921–1985), American photographer, photojournalist and filmmaker
- Stuart Orkin, American physician, stem cell biologist, and researcher
- Otto Orkin, founder of Orkin Pest Control
