= Christof Perick =

German orchestra conductor (born 1946)

Christof Prick (born 1946) is a German orchestra conductor. He uses the name Christof Perick in English-speaking countries. His father was the concertmaster of the Hamburg Philharmonic.

== Biography ==
Born in Hamburg, Prick studied at the University of Music and Theater in his hometown Hamburg. He was appointed to the Theater Saarbrücken as Germany's youngest general music director in 1974. From 1977 to 1986, he was responsible for the Staatstheater Karlsruhe and the Badische Staatskapelle in the same position. He was Generalmusikdirektor of the Niedersächsisches Staatsorchester and of the Staatsoper Hannover from 1993 to 1996.

His work in contemporary music has included conducting the premiere of Wolfgang Rihm's opera Oedipus in October 1987.

Perick became Music Director of the Charlotte Symphony Orchestra in 2001. He stepped down from this post in 2010 and served as the orchestra's conductor laureate for the 2010–2011 season.

From 2006 to 2011, Perick was Music Director of the Staatstheater Nürnberg, including the post of principal conductor of the Staatsphilharmonie Nürnberg. In addition to his conducting posts, since 1999, he has been a professor of conducting at the Staatliche Hochschule für Musik in Hamburg. In July 2015, the Beethoven Orchester Bonn announced the appointment of Perick as its interim Generalmusikdirektor for the 2016–2017 season.

== Recordings ==
Perick's recordings include a 1988 recording of Franz Schmidt's rarely heard opera Notre Dame.

== Personal life ==
Perick and his wife Ulrike, an actress, make their home in Germany.

Cultural offices
| Preceded by Siegfried Köhler | Generalmusikdirektor, Saarländisches Staatsorchester Saarbrücken; 1974–1977 | Succeeded by Matthias Kuntzsch |
| Preceded by Arthur Grüber | Generalmusikdirektor, Badische Staatskapelle; 1977–1985 | Succeeded by José Maria Collado |
| Preceded by Iona Brown | Music Director, Los Angeles Chamber Orchestra; 1992–1995 | Succeeded by Jeffrey Kahane |
| Preceded by George Alexander Albrecht | Generalmusikdirektor, Staatsoper Hannover; 1993–1996 | Succeeded by Andreas Delfs |
| Preceded by Peter McCoppin | Music Director, Charlotte Symphony; 2001–2010 | Succeeded by Christopher Warren-Green |
| Preceded by Johannes Fritzsch | Generalmusikdirektor, Staatstheater Nürnberg; 2006–2011 | Succeeded by Marcus Bosch |
| Preceded by Stefan Blunier | Generalmusikdirektor, Beethoven Orchester Bonn; 2016–2017 | Succeeded by Dirk Kaftan |
