= Jacobowsky und der Oberst (opera) =

Opera by Giselher Klebe

- Opera by Giselher Klebe
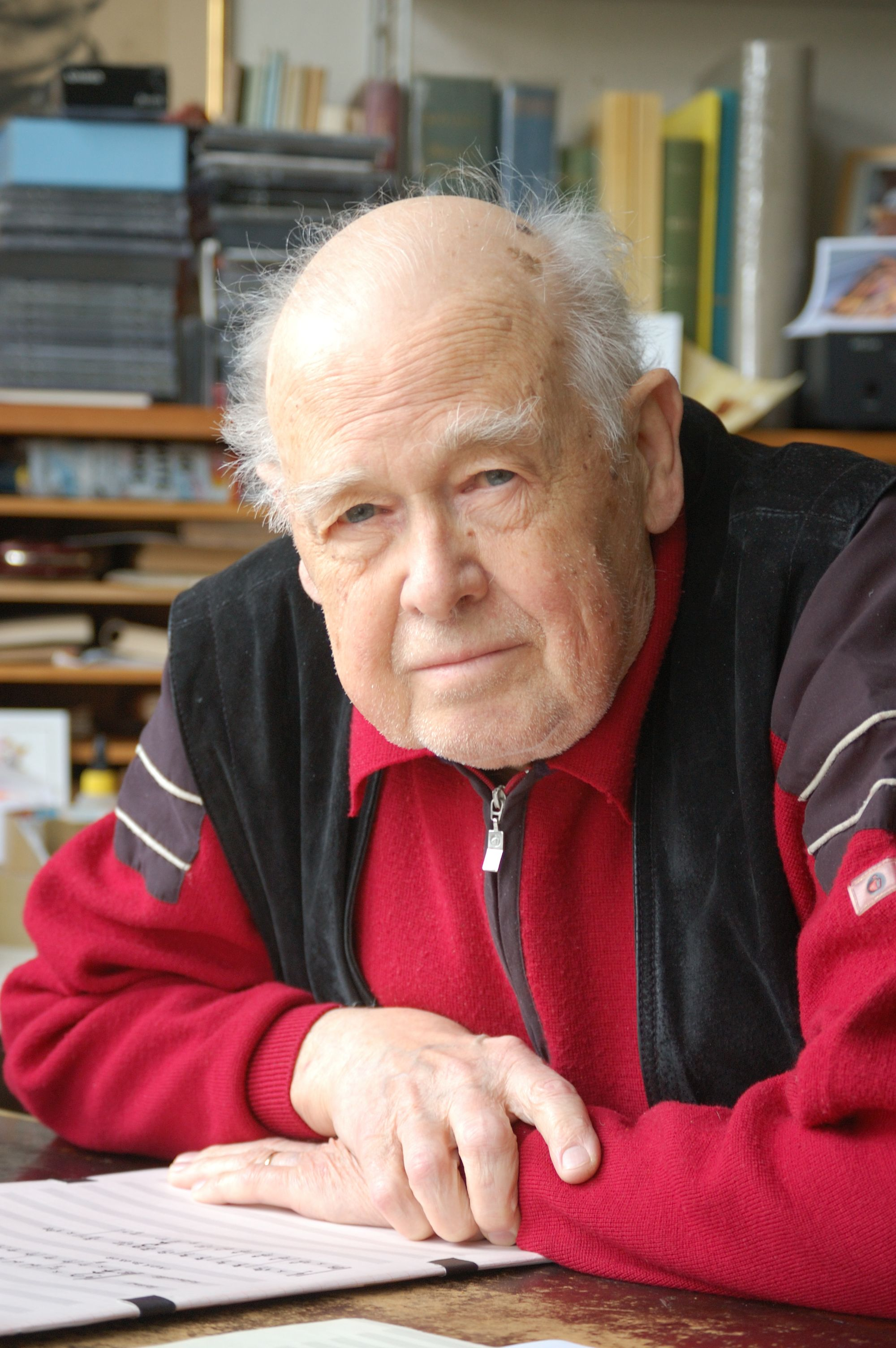
- The composer in 2008
- Translation: Jacobovsky and the Colonel
- Librettist: Klebe
- Language: German
- Based on: Jacobowsky und der Oberst by Franz Werfel
- Premiere: 2 November 1965; Hamburg State Opera

Jacobowsky und der Oberst, Op. 49, (Jacobovsky and the Colonel) is an opera in four acts by Giselher Klebe who also wrote the libretto based on the 1944 play Jacobowsky und der Oberst by Franz Werfel.

It premiered on 2 November 1965 at the Hamburg State Opera which had commissioned the work. Klebe dedicated it to the then director of the Staatsoper, Rolf Liebermann.

== Roles ==
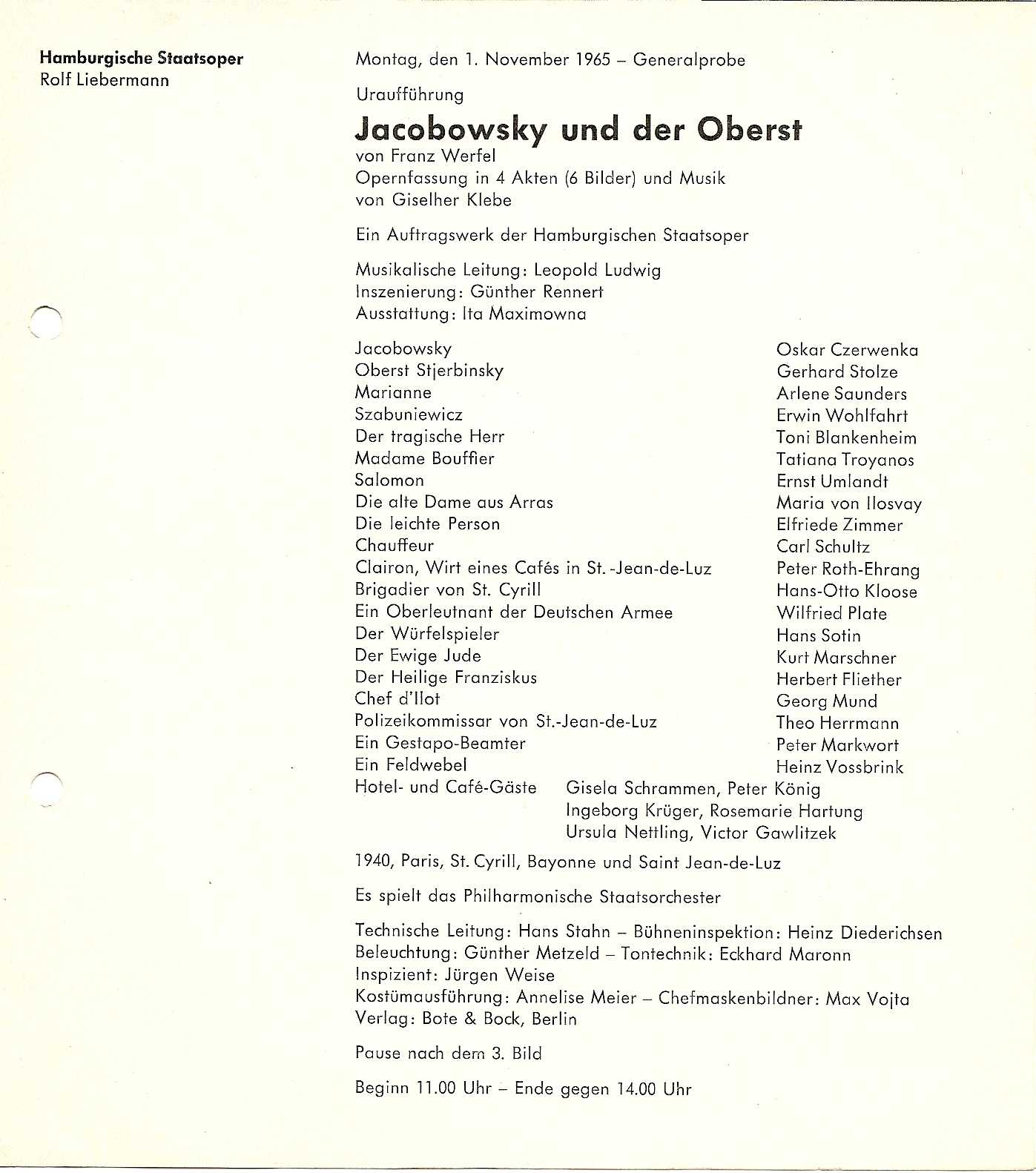
Playbill of the premiere

Role	Voice type	Premiere cast, 2 November 1965 Conductor: Leopold Ludwig
Jacobowsky	baritone	Oskar Czerwenka
Colonel Stjerbinsky	tenor	Gerhard Stolze
Marianne	soprano	Arlene Saunders
Szabuniewicz	baritone	Erwin Wohlfahrt
The tragic gentleman	baritone	Toni Blankenheim
Madame Bouffier	mezzo-soprano	Tatiana Troyanos
Salomon	bass	Ernst Umlandt
The old lady from Arras	contralto	Maria von Ilosvay
The flirting woman	soprano	Elfriede Zimmer
Chauffeur	bass	Carl Schultz
Clairon, café-owner in Saint-Jean-de-Luz	bass	Peter Roth-Ehrang
Brigadier at Saint Cyrill	bass	Hans-Otto Kloose
First Lieutenant in the German army	tenor	Wilfried Plate
The dice player	bass	Hans Sotin
The Wandering Jew	tenor	Kurt Marschner
St. Francis	baritone	Herbert Fliether
Chef D'ilot	spoken	Georg Mund
Police chief of Saint-Jean-de-Luz	spoken	Theo Herrmann
A Gestapo official	spoken	Peter Markwort
A Warrant Officer	spoken	Heinz Vossbrink
Hotel and café guests	2 sopranos, contralto, tenor	
Orchestra	Philharmonisches Staatsorchester Hamburg	Philharmonisches Staatsorchester Hamburg
Director	Günther Rennert	Günther Rennert
Scene design	Ita Maximowna	Ita Maximowna

Time and place: 1940, Paris, St. Cyrill, Bayonne and Saint-Jean-de-Luz

The first American performance was on 27 June 1967 at the Metropolitan Opera in New York City, using the same cast, conducted by Matthias Kuntzsch.
