= Rudolf Piernay =

German opera singer

Rudolf Piernay (born 8 December 1943 in Berlin) is a German vocal teacher and university lecturer.

== Biography ==
Piernay spent his childhood, youth, and first studied in Berlin, then began the study of singing, piano, song accompaniment and conducting in London. He has been teaching since 1974 at the Guildhall School of Music and Drama and has also been a professor at the Musikhochschule Mannheim since 1991 and at the Académie internationale d'été de Nice.

His pupils include, among others, Bryn Terfel, Ema Nikolovska, Markus Brutscher, Melanie Diener, Hanno Müller-Brachmann, Caroline Melzer, Michael Volle, Stephanie Hampl, Hanna-Elisabeth Müller, Jens Hamann, James Martin, Martin Wistinghausen and Konrad Jarnot.

Piernay also performs in the bass baritone tessitura as a concert and lieder singer. He is a lecturer for master classes.
