= Hanna-Elisabeth Müller =

German soprano

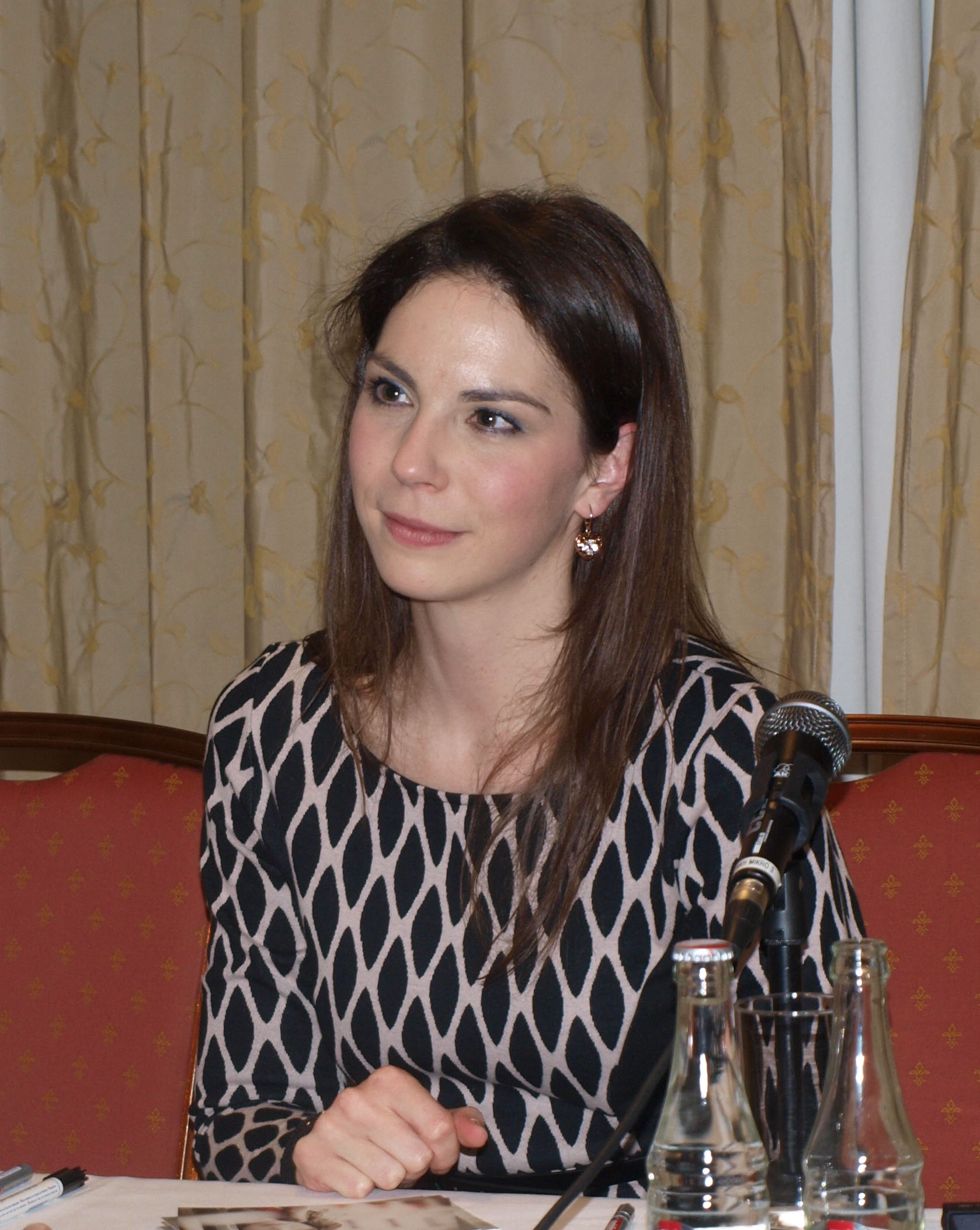
- Hanna-Elisabeth Müller, 2014
- Born: Hanna-Elisabeth Müller; 3 May 1985 (age 40); Mannheim, Germany
- Occupation: Operatic soprano
- Website: hannaelisabethmueller.de

Hanna-Elisabeth Müller (born 3 May 1985 in Mannheim) is a German soprano in opera, concert and recitals.

== Life ==
=== Musical education ===
As a child, Müller took violin lessons with Dinu Hartwich and later joined a choir. Since the age of 11, she took vocal lessons with Judith Janzen to sing solo parts. In 1998, she performed the boy soprano in Leonard Bernstein's MASS during the Kultursommer Ludwigshafen. She continued singing as a hobby during her high school education and earned several prizes in the junior musician's competition Jugend musiziert.

=== Early career ===
Following her high school degree, she studied vocal arts in the soloist class of former opera singer Rudolf Piernay at the Hochschule für Musik und Darstellende Kunst Mannheim. To complete her studies, she attended master classes of Dietrich Fischer-Dieskau, Júlia Várady, Edith Wiens, Elly Ameling, Thomas Hampson and Wolfram Rieger.

In the song duo competition 2009 at Enschede, Netherlands, she gained, together with her accompanist Mihaela Tomi, the highest award, the audience award and the award for the best interpretation of a contemporary opus. In 2010 she gained the 1st prize in the competition Ton und Erklärung – Werkvermittlung in Musik und Wort of the Kulturkreis der Deutschen Wirtschaft. This award was given by a jury of nine experts chaired by Francisco Araiza and attests that she is not only able to perform music on the highest level but also to explain it convincingly. In 2011, she obtained awards in the Ada Sari International Vocal Art Competition at Nowy Sącz.

She made her stage debut as Euridice in Gluck's Orfeo ed Euridice at Kammeroper Schloss Rheinsberg in 2010, followed by Pamina in Mozart's Die Zauberflöte at Theater & Philharmonie Thüringen, Gera in 2011. She also represented this role at the Teatro dell'Opera di Roma in March 2012. On 22 December 2013 she was featured by Rolando Villazón in the series Stars de Demain by Arte.

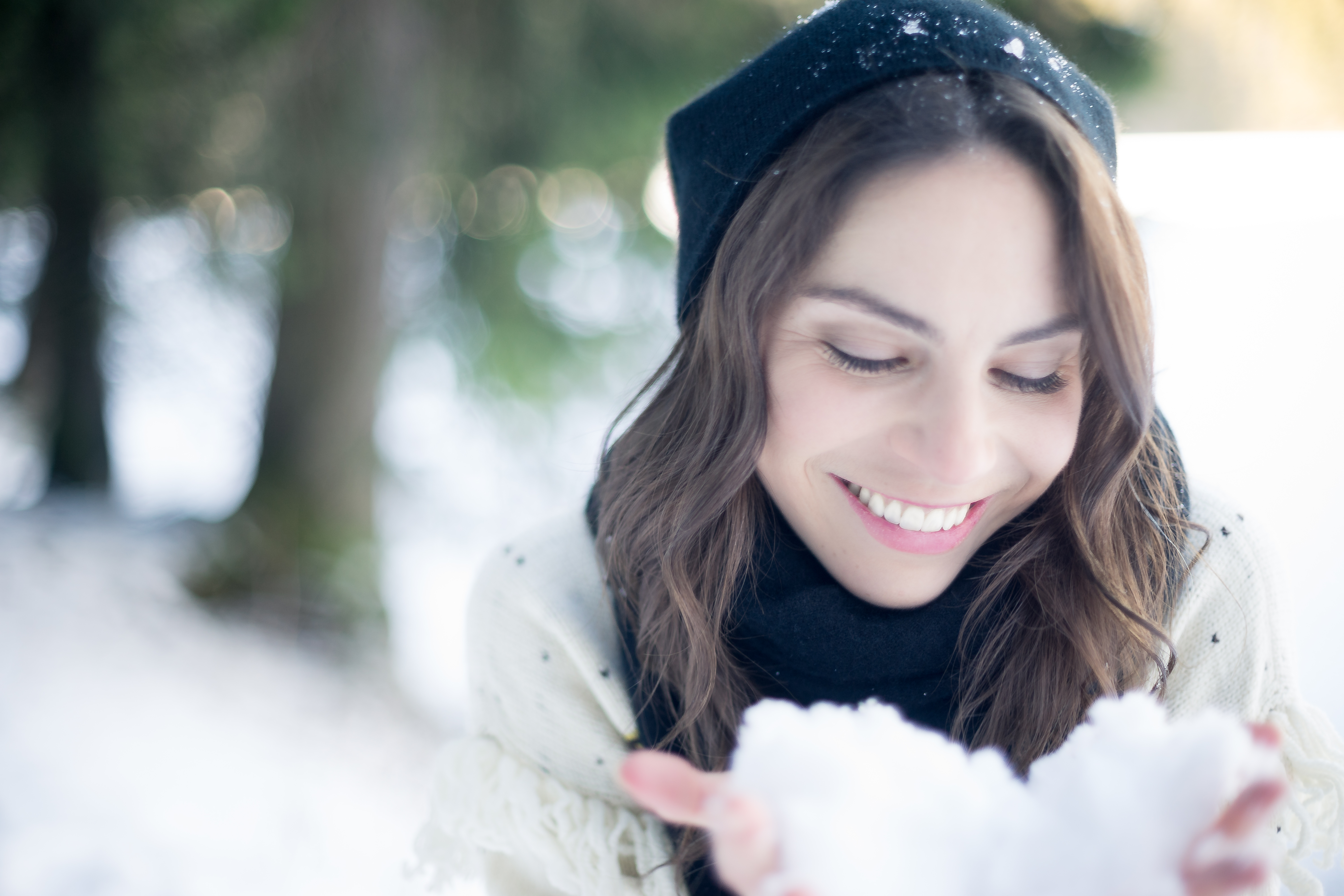
Müller in 2016

=== Bavarian State Opera ===
At the Bavarian State Opera, Munich, Müller was member of the opera studio in the season 2010/11 and member of the company from the season 2012/2013 to 2015/2016. This resulted in a number of successful role debuts, e.g. as Gretel in Hänsel und Gretel (March 2013), Zerlina in Don Giovanni (May 2013), Susanna in Le nozze di Figaro (September 2013), Sophie in Werther (October 2015) und Marzelline in Fidelio (February 2016). Furthermore, she presented roles which she already had performed at other opera houses, i.e. Zdenka in Andreas Dresen's new production of Arabella during Munich Opera Festival in July 2015 and Sophie in Der Rosenkavalier in July 2016. In 2013 she obtained the "Festspielpreis der Gesellschaft zur Förderung der Münchner Opernfestspiele".

=== Other opera houses ===
On 12 April 2014 she debuted as Zdenka in Arabella by Richard Strauss during the Salzburg Easter Festival. She was on stage together with Renée Fleming and Thomas Hampson and convinced the audience as well as the critics. This success was crucial for the election as Nachwuchskünstlerin des Jahres (upcoming artist of the year) by the critics of the journal Opernwelt. As Zdenka she also debuted at the Semperoper Dresden in November 2014. On 5 September 2015 she debuted as Sophie in Der Rosenkavalier at De Nederlandse Opera Amsterdam.

In 2017 Müller passed important milestones of her international career, namely her debut at the Metropolitan Opera, New York, as Marzelline in Jürgen Flimm's production of Fidelio (March 2017), and at La Scala, Milan, where she had her role debut as Donna Anna in Don Giovanni. Her first performance at Zürich Opera House was in February 2018 in the new role of Ilia in Idomeneo,

=== Oratorios and recitals ===
Beside her engagements at opera houses, Müller frequently sings in recitals and oratorios. Sponsoring by Südwestrundfunk in the SWR2 New Talent Program from 2013 to 2015 gave her the opportunity to reach a broad audience with the audio transmissions of two song recitals. One of them was her debut at Schwetzinger Festspiele, together with the pianist Juliane Ruf, on 26 May 2013.

In October 2014 she sang the soprano solo in Ein deutsches Requiem by Johannes Brahms in a performance transmitted by 3sat together with the WDR Symphony Orchestra and Jukka-Pekka Saraste. In China she was featured by Staatskapelle Dresden during their concert tour in November 2015, singing the soprano part of the Symphony No. 4 by Gustav Mahler. In March 2016 she debuted with Four Last Songs by Richard Strauss in concerts of the Orquesta Sinfónica del Principado de Asturias at Bilbao (Spain) and with the WDR Symphony Orchestra at Viersen and Duisburg. In the opening concert of Salzburg Festival 2016 she sang the soprano part (Gabriel and Eva) in The Creation by Joseph Haydn, and in the season opening concert at Philharmonie de Paris in September 2016 she debuted as Gretchen in Szenen aus Goethes Faust by Robert Schumann. On 11 January 2017 she replaced at short notice the indisposed Camilla Tilling at the opening concert of the Elbphilharmonie Hamburg for in the fourth movement of Beethoven's Symphony No. 9.

=== Recording ===
In 2019 Müller signed an exclusive multi-album agreement with Pentatone.

== Repertoire ==
Müller performed the following roles in well-renowned opera houses:

- Berta (Il Barbiere di Siviglia), Bavarian State Opera, Munich
- Donna Anna (Don Giovanni), Teatro alla Scala, Milano
- Donna Clara (Der Zwerg), Bavarian State Opera
- Eurydice (Orfeo ed Euridice), Kammeroper Schloss Rheinsberg
- Gretel (Hänsel und Gretel), Bavarian State Opera
- Ilia (Idomeneo), Zürich Opera House
- Marzelline (Fidelio), Bavarian State Opera, Munich; Metropolitan Opera, New York
- Pamina (Die Zauberflöte), Teatro dell'opera di Roma; Bavarian State Opera, Munich; Royal Festival Hall, London (concert staging)
- Princess (L'enfant et les sortilèges), Bavarian State Opera
- Rosalinde (Die Fledermaus) Vienna State Opera
- Servilia (La clemenza di Tito), Bavarian State Opera
- Sophie (Der Rosenkavalier), De Nederlandse Opera, Amsterdam; Bavarian State Opera
- Sophie (Werther), Bavarian State Opera
- Susanna (Le nozze di Figaro), Bavarian State Opera
- Woglinde (Das Rheingold, Götterdämmerung), Bavarian State Opera
- Zdenka (Arabella), Großes Festspielhaus, Salzburg; Semperoper, Dresden; Bavarian State Opera
- Zerlina (Don Giovanni), Bavarian State Opera

Her concert repertoire includes the soprano parts of numerous oratorios and masses as well as orchestral songs and concert arias from Baroque to Late Romanticism, for example Haydn's Die Schöpfung and the Missa in angustiis (Nelsonmesse), Beethoven's Missa solemnis, Ein deutsches Requiem by Brahms, Mahler's Symphony No. 4, lieder by Franz Schubert orchestrated by Felix Mottl, Alban Berg's Seven Early Songs and Four Last Songs by R. Strauss.

In recitals broadcast by Südwestrundfunk she performed songs by Benjamin Britten, Francis Poulenc, Robert Schumann, Richard Strauss, William Walton and Hugo Wolf.

== Discography ==
=== Audio ===
- Mass No. 3 in F minor by Anton Bruckner, Hanna-Elisabeth Müller, Anke Vondung, Dominik Wortig, Franz-Josef Selig, Chor des Bayerischen Rundfunks, Bamberger Symphoniker, Robin Ticciati. Tudor, April 2014.
- "Traumgekrönt"; songs by Richard Strauss, Arnold Schönberg and Alban Berg. Hanna-Elisabeth Müller, soprano; Juliane Ruf, piano. Belvedere, June 2017.
- Mahler: Symphony No. 4 in G major. Hanna-Elisabeth Müller, Soprano; Duisburger Symphoniker, Ádám Fischer. CAvi, August 2017.
- R. Strauss: Der Rosenkavalier. Hanna-Elisabeth Müller as Sophie, Camilla Nylund as Marschallin, Paula Murrihy as Oktavian, Peter Rose as Baron Ochs von Lerchenau. Netherlands Philharmonic Orchestra, Marc Albrecht. Live recording of September 2015, Challenge Classics, September 2017.
- Reine de coeur, Hanna-Elisabeth Müller soprano, Juliane Ruf piano (Francis Poulenc, Robert Schumann, Alexander von Zemlinsky), February 2020, Pentatone
- Sinnbild Strauss Songs, Hanna-Elisabeth Müller soprano, WDR Symphony Orchestra Cologne, cond. Christoph Eschenbach, June 2022, Pentatone

=== DVD ===
- Richard Strauss: Arabella. Live recording of Salzburg Easter Festival 2014 with Hanna-Elisabeth Müller as Zdenka, Renée Fleming as Arabella, Thomas Hampson as Mandryka, Daniel Behle as Matteo. Stage director: Florentine Klepper. Sächsischer Staatsopernchor and Staatskapelle Dresden under the direction of Christian Thielemann. Unitel Classica, September 2014.
- Johannes Brahms: Ein deutsches Requiem. Live recording of a concert in Stift St. Florian, August 2016, with Hanna-Elisabeth Müller, soprano, Simon Keenlyside, baritone, the Cleveland Orchestra and the Wiener Singverein conducted by Franz Welser-Möst. Concorde, January 2017.
- Inauguration concert of the Elbphilharmonie, Hamburg. Hanna-Elisabeth Müller as the soprano soloist in the fourth movement of Beethoven's Symphony No. 9. NDR Elbphilharmonie Orchester conducted by Thomas Hengelbrock. CMajor, June 2017.
