= Youth Symphony Orchestra of Ukraine =

Ukrainian symphony orchestra

Youth Symphony Orchestra of Ukraine Молодіжний симфонічний оркестр України
- National youth orchestra
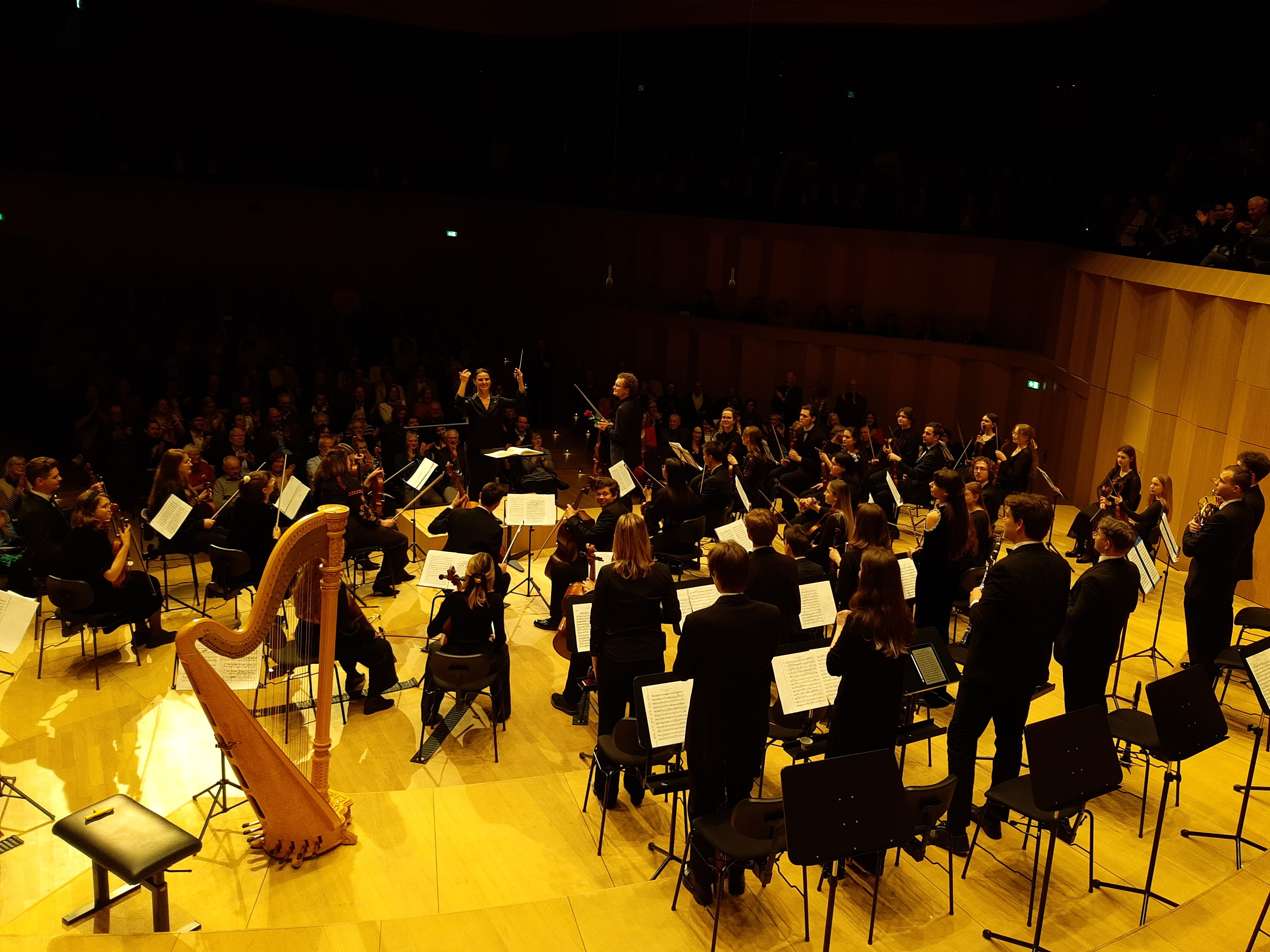
- The orchestra in concert at the Casals Forum in 2024
- Founded: 2017
- Principal conductor: Oksana Lyniv
- Website: ysou.com.ua/en/

The Youth Symphony Orchestra of Ukraine (Ukrainian: Молодіжний симфонічний оркестр України, romanized: Molodizhnyi symfonichnyi orkestr Ukrainy) is a Ukrainian national youth orchestra founded by conductor Oksana Lyniv in 2016. She has conducted the orchestra in major concerts halls and festivals in Europe.

== History ==
The Youth Symphony Orchestra of Ukraine (YSOU) was founded in 2016 by conductor Oksana Lyniv. A conductor with an international career, Lyniv was music director of the Oper Graz (appointed 2017) prior to becoming the first woman appointed music director of the Teatro Comunale di Bologna in 2022. She was trained at opera houses in Ukraine and at the Bavarian State Opera. The New York Times described her "as something of a pioneer in a field still heavily dominated by men."

Lyniv modeled the YSOU after the Bundesjugendorchester, a German national youth orchestra. She founded the orchestra with the support of this orchestra, and the support of both the Beethovenfest in Bonn and the broadcaster Deutsche Welle. The first concerts were held in August 2017 together with the Bundesjugendorchester. This joint group played four concerts, in Lviv and Kyiv in Ukraine, and Bonn and Berlin in Germany. The performance in Lviv was part of the Mozart Festival LvivMozArt that Lyniv had founded.

After the Russian invasion of Ukraine in 2022, the YSOU began an evacuation project for its musicians, called "Music for the Future". It was carried out in collaboration with the Slovenian Youth Orchestra in Ljubljana. A concert tour that summer, name "United for the future", included around 30 concerts at ten music festivals in Austria, Germany and Switzerland, including Herbstgold in Eisenstadt, Bachfest Leipzig, Munich Opera Festival, Young Euro Classic in Berlin, and Lucerne Festival.

The YSOU was accepted into the European Federation of National Youth Orchestras (EFNYO) in June 2022. The ensemble was awarded the 2022 Musikpreis der Stadt Duisburg from the Köhler-Osbahr Foundation, recognizing "outstanding achievement in the field of music". The Berlin Philharmonic became patron of the YSOU as well as of the Kyiv Symphony Orchestra in 2023.

In 2023, Lyniv conducted the YSOU playing the German premiere of Odessa Rhapsody by Evgeni Orkin. This tone poem in four movements related to the city Odesa, was dedicated to Lyniv by the composer. It was first performed in Paris the previous year and had earned the composer the European Composer's Prize. The conductor contrasted the work with Beethoven's Fifth Symphony in a concert of Young Euro Classic at the Konzerthaus Berlin. Reviewer Eleonore Büning wrote for Der Tagesspiegel that the players were in "professional top form".

As part of their Spring 2024 tour, the YSOU gave a concert at the Casals Forum of the Kronberg Academy. Lyniv and the YSOU began that concert with Maria's City by Ukrainian composer Zoltan Almashi; a work named for the city of Mariupol. It was followed by Ravel's Pavane pour une infante défunte, Mendelssohn's Violin Concerto, and Schumann's First Symphony. The solo violinist was Dmytro Udovychenko, a student of the Kronberg Academy. A reviewer from the Frankfurter Allgemeine Zeitung noted "lament, aggression and hope" in the concise opening piece and a refreshing view on Mendelssohn's concerto.
