= Beethoven Orchester Bonn =

German symphony orchestra

- Symphony orchestra
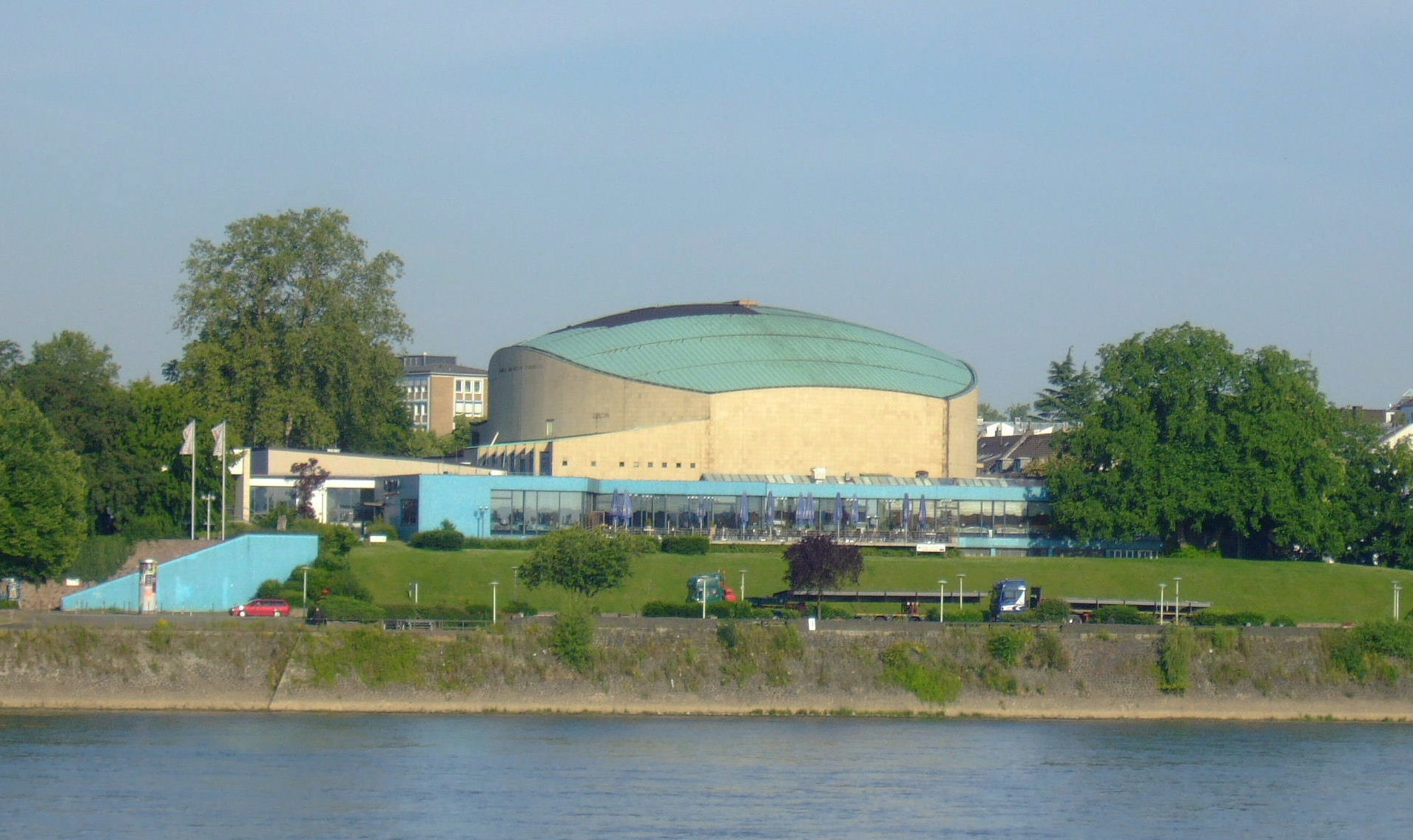
- The Beethovenhalle, the main venue of the orchestra
- Former name: Städtisches Orchester Bonn; Orchester der Beethovenhalle Bonn
- Founded: 1907
- Location: Bonn, Germany
- Principal conductor: Dirk Kaftan
- Website: www.beethoven-orchester.de/orchester/orchester/

The Beethoven Orchester Bonn is a German symphony orchestra based in Bonn, North Rhine-Westphalia. It dates back to 1907, when a professional orchestra was established. Named for Ludwig van Beethoven, who was born in Bonn, the orchestra's principal concert venue is the Beethovenhalle.

== History ==
The orchestra dates back to 1907 when the town of Bonn signed a contract with the Philharmonische Orchester Koblenz from Koblenz and its Kapellmeister, to serve Bonn. It was the first professional orchestra in Bonn since the court chapel had been dissolved in 1794. It was first named Städtisches Orchester Bonn (Municipal orchestra Bonn), from 1963 Orchester der Beethovenhalle Bonn (Orchestra of the Beethovenhalle Bonn), and from 2003 Beethoven Orchester Bonn.

In 1907, Richard Strauss conducted his works in Bonn with the orchestra. The Mittelrheinisches Musikfest of 1914 attracted Max Reger, Fritz Busch and Max Bruch. The orchestra suffered in World War I, when its main venue, the old Beethovenhalle, served as a lazaretto, and many players were recruited. The orchestra was dissolved in April 1916, and only reestablished in 1920. During World War II, the hall was damaged by bombing. The new Beethovenhalle was inaugurated in 1959.

The centenary of the orchestra was celebrated on 21 September 2007 as part of the Beethovenfest, performing the premiere of the symphony "Abendland" by Karsten Gundermann, Beethoven's First Symphony and Edward Elgar's Violin Concerto with Gidon Kremer as the soloist. An exhibition in the opera house was dedicated to the history.

As of 2017, the orchestra has around 100 players, performing each year some 115 performances at the Bonn Opera including all premieres, 40 concerts in Bonn, mostly in the Beethovenhalle, and guest concerts in Germany and abroad. Stefan Blunier was GMD from 2008 to 2016. Christof Perick served as interim GMD of the orchestra for the 2016–2017 season. In February 2016, Dirk Kaftan was named as the next GMD of the orchestra, effective August 2017, with an initial contract of five years. In September 2020, the city of Bonn announced the extension of Kaftan's contract as GMD through 2027. In September 2025, the city of Bonn announced the approval of the most recent extension of Kaftan's contract as GMD, through 31 July 2032.

== Generalmusikdirektor (GMD) ==
- Hugo Grütgers (1907–1922)
- Max Anton (1922–1930)
- Hermann Abendroth (interim 1931–1932)
- Gustav Classens (1933–1949)
- Otto Volkmann (1949–1957)
- Volker Wangenheim (1957–1978)
- Jan Krenz (1979–1982)
- Gustav Kuhn (1983–1985)
- Dennis Russell Davies (1987–1995)
- Marc Soustrot (1995–2003)
- Roman Kofman (2003–2008)
- Stefan Blunier (2008–2016)
- Christof Perick (2016–2017)
- Dirk Kaftan (2017–present)

== Literature ==
- Terschüren, Heinz-Dieter (2007). 100 Jahre Beethoven-Orchester Bonn (in German). Stadtarchiv. ISBN 978-3-922832-41-6.
