= Roland Kluttig =

German conductor (born 1968)

Roland Kluttig (born 1968 in Radeberg) is a German conductor.

== Biography ==
From 1986 to 1991 he studied conducting at the Hochschule für Musik "Carl Maria von Weber" in Dresden. He attended master classes with Sylvain Cambreling, Peter Eötvös and John Eliot Gardiner. From 1992 to 1999, he was conductor of the Kammerensemble Neue Musik Berlin. From 2000 to 2004, he served as an assistant conductor to Lothar Zagrosek at the Stuttgart State Opera.

Kluttig was Generalmusikdirektor (GMD) at the Landestheater Coburg from 2010 to 2020. In December 2018, Graz Opera announced the appointment of Kluttig as its next principal conductor, effective with the 2020–2021 season, with an initial contract of 3 seasons. He is scheduled to stand down from his Graz Opera post at the close of the 2022–2023 season.

Cultural offices
Preceded by Alois Seidlmeier	Generalmusikdirektor, Landestheater Coburg; 2010–2020	Succeeded by Daniel Carter
Preceded by Oksana Lyniv	Chief Conductor, Graz Opera; 2020–2023	Succeeded by Vassilis Christopoulos
