= Dirk Kaftan =

German opera and concert conductor (born 1971)

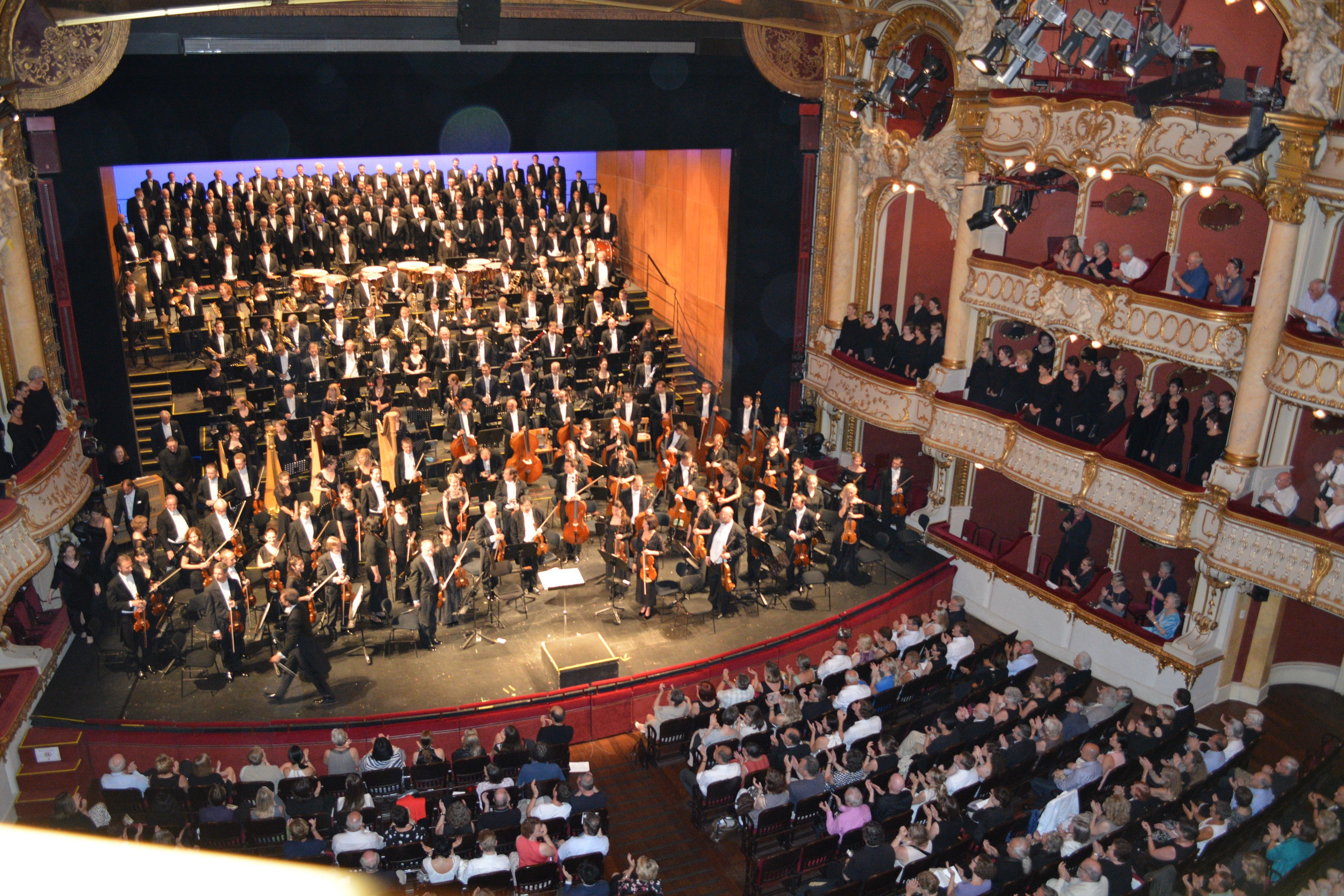
- Kaftan's debut as GMD in Graz with Schönberg's Gurre-Lieder in 2013
- Born: 1971 (age 53–54); Marburg, Hesse, Germany
- Education: Hochschule für Musik Detmold
- Occupation: Conductor
- Organizations: Theater Augsburg; Graz Opera

Dirk Kaftan (born 1971) is a German opera and concert conductor.

== Career ==
Born in Marburg, West Germany, Kaftan grew up in Wittlich and Canada. At the age of 18 he began employment as a repetiteur at the Theater Trier. Kaftan then studied sound engineering (Tonmeister) at the Hochschule für Musik Detmold.

Kaftan was Erster Kapellmeister at the Graz Opera from 2006 to 2009. From 2009 to 2014 he was Generalmusikdirektor (GMD) in Augsburg. His contract with the Theater Augsburg was to have run till 2016; however he vacated the Augsburg post early to return to Graz Opera as their GMD. His debut in June 2013 was a performance of Schönberg's Gurre-Lieder with soloists, the expanded opera chorus, the Wiener Singverein and the Grazer Philharmonisches Orchester. Kaftan was GMD of Graz Opera from 2013 to 2017. In Graz, his repertoire included Wagner's Tristan und Isolde, Zemlinsky's Der Zwerg, Dallapiccola's Der Gefangene and Bernstein's West Side Story, among others. In concert he conducted the oratorio Columbus by Heinrich von Herzogenberg. In 2015 Kaftan was awarded the Karl Böhm Interpretationspreis by the Styrian state government for his work in developing the Grazer Philharmonisches Orchester.

Kaftan's operatic repertoire has also included Wagner's Der fliegende Holländer, Lohengrin, Tannhäuser and Die Walküre; Verdi's Rigoletto, La Traviata, Aida and Don Carlos; Tchaikovsky's Eugen Onegin; Arabella by Richard Strauss; and Stravinsky's ballet Le sacre du printemps.

In February 2016, Kaftan was named as the next GMD of the city of Bonn, including the directorship of the Beethoven Orchester Bonn, effective August 2017 with an initial contract of five years. In September 2020, the city of Bonn announced the extension of Kaftan's contract as GMD through 2027. In September 2025, the city of Bonn announced the approval of the most recent extension of Kaftan's contract as GMD, through 31 July 2032.

== Recordings ==
Kaftan's recordings include the operas Der ferne Klang by Franz Schreker, recorded live in Augsburg in 2011, and Jenůfa by Leoš Janáček, recorded during staged performances in Graz in 2015.

Cultural offices
Preceded by Rudolf Piehlmayer	Generalmusikdirektor, Theater Augsburg; 2009–2014	Succeeded by Domonkos Héja
Preceded by Johannes Fritzsch	Generalmusikdirektor, Graz Opera; 2013–2017	Succeeded by Oksana Lyniv
Preceded by Christof Perick	Generalmusikdirektor, Beethoven Orchester Bonn; 2017–present	Succeeded by incumbent
