= Ita Maximowna =

Russian-born German scenic designer (1901–1988)

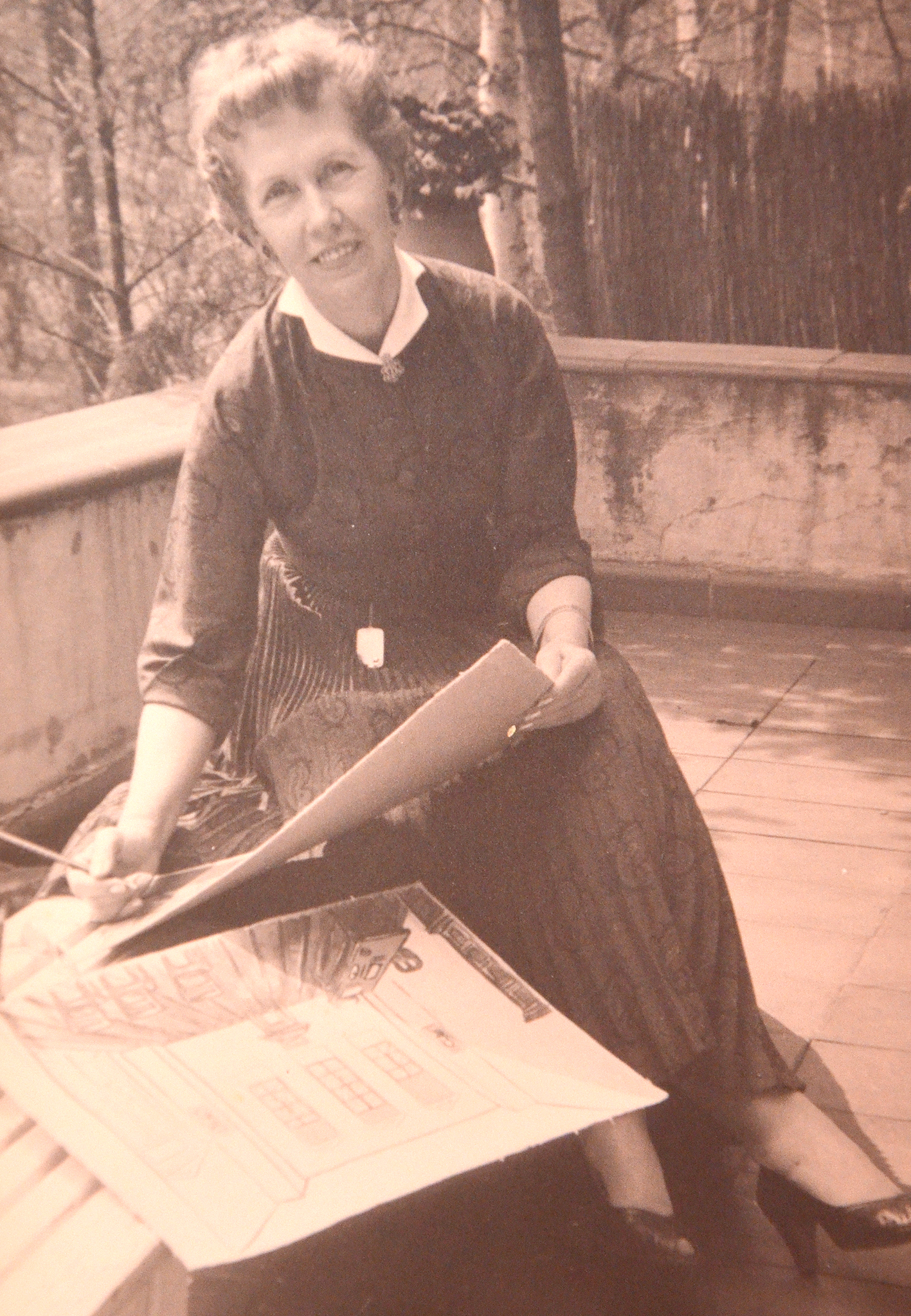
- Ita Maximowna c. 1950
- Born: Margarita Maximowna Schnakenburg; 18 October 1901; Pskov, Pskov Governorate, Russian Empire
- Died: 8 April 1988 (aged 86); West Berlin
- Occupations: Scenic designer; Costume designer; Illustrator
- Awards: Berliner Kunstpreis; Order of Merit of the Federal Republic of Germany

Ita Maximowna (born Margarita Maximowna Schnakenburg; 18 October [O.S. 31 October] 1901 – 8 April 1988) was a Russian-German scenic designer, costume designer and illustrator. She was one of the first women in the professions in Germany who worked internationally. Trained as a painter, she came to the theatre late, after World War II in Berlin, and became a scenic designer first in theatres of the city, then internationally both for plays and opera, and in collaboration with directors such as a Günther Rennert and conductors such as Herbert von Karajan.

== Life and career ==
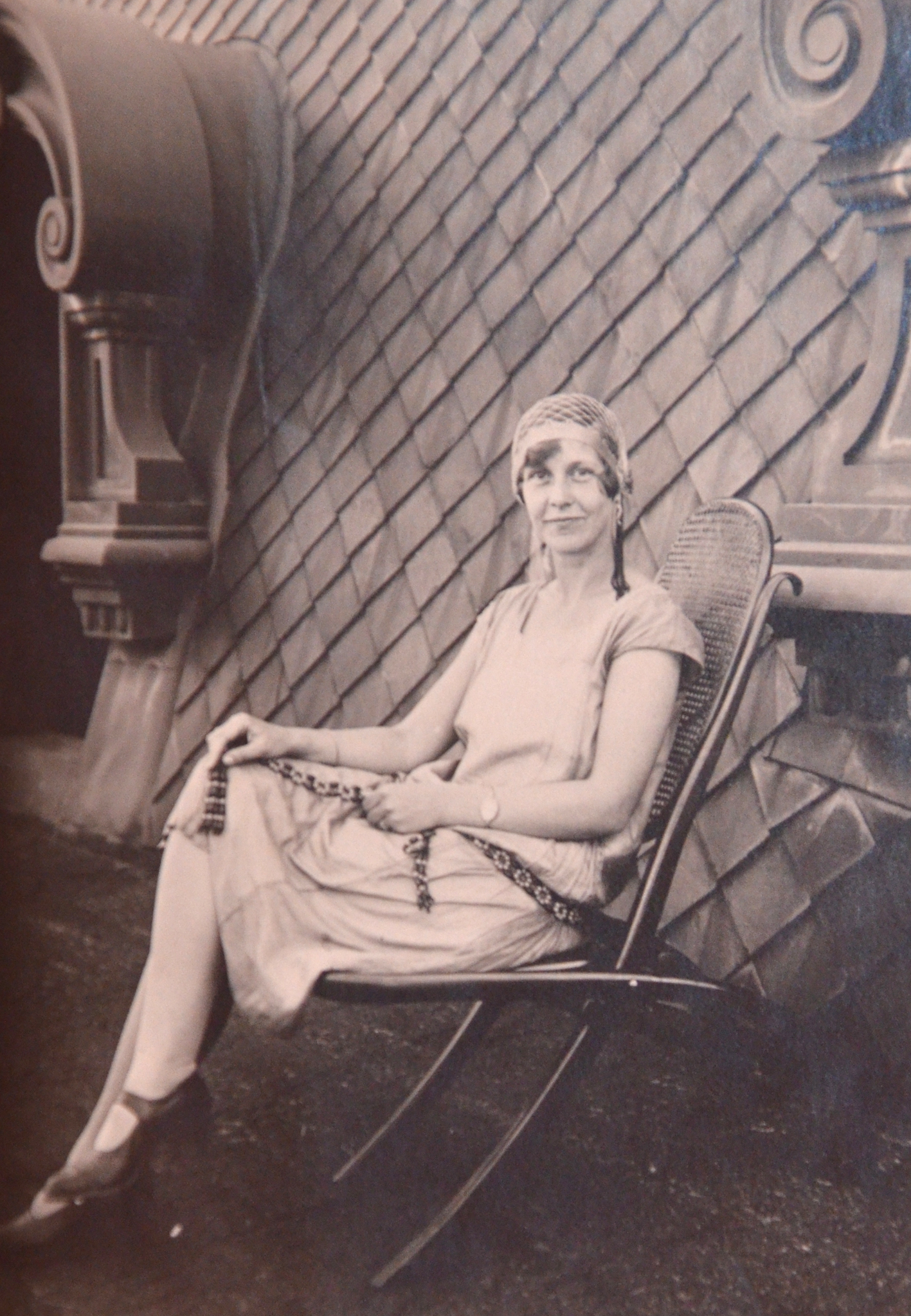
Maximowna in 1926

Born Margarita Maximowna Schnakenburg in Pskov in northwestern Russia, she was the daughter of dentists Elisabeth Natalie Ernestine Schnakenburg, née von Roth (1878–1966), and her husband Max Karl Heinrich Schnakenburg (1875–1919). Her older brother was Heinrich Ludwig Nicolai Schnakenburg. Her father died in 1919 of tuberculosis. Then, during the unrest after the 1917 October Revolution, the family fled to relatives in Davos, Switzerland. In 1920, they moved to Germany, where her brother became an apprentice of Heinrich Julius Mäser's Technikum für Buchdrucker (vocational college for book printers) in Leipzig, while she moved to Berlin with her mother.

In 1920, she moved to Paris as a teacher of Russian. There she met the graphic designer and stage designer Marie Laurencin, with whom she studied for several years. From 1925, she studied further with the painter Erwin Freytag (1901–1940) and Johannes Boehland at the Prussian Academy of Arts in Berlin. In the early 1930s, she married Carl Fredrik Baumann, a former director of the Maizena company in Hamburg. She designed packaging of the company's products and advertising. She also illustrated books.

In 1945, she met her future partner Karlheinz Martin, who was instrumental in reestablishing theatre in Berlin after the war. As general manager of the Hebbel-Theater, he opened the field of stage and costume design for her. Under her shortened name, she worked for many years for the Hebbel-Theater, Renaissance-Theater, Schiller Theater and Schlosspark Theater. She was invited to the U.S. where she learned new techniques in three months, and returned to be a specialist for American plays. She also worked internationally for opera houses in London, Paris, Milan, Vancouver, Buenos Aires and New York City. She collaborated with directors including O. E. Hasse, Karl-Heinz Stroux and especially Günther Rennert, and conductors such as Leo Blech and Herbert von Karajan. She often worked with her assistant and friend Martin Rupprecht.

In the 1960s and 1970s, she also created film sets, such as Die Spieler and Die Nacht in Zaandam by Ludwig Berger, Der Revisor by Gustav Rudolf Sellner, and Die seltsamen Abenteuer des geheimen Kanzleisekretärs Tusmann by Helmut Käutner. At the end of her career, she turned to painting again.

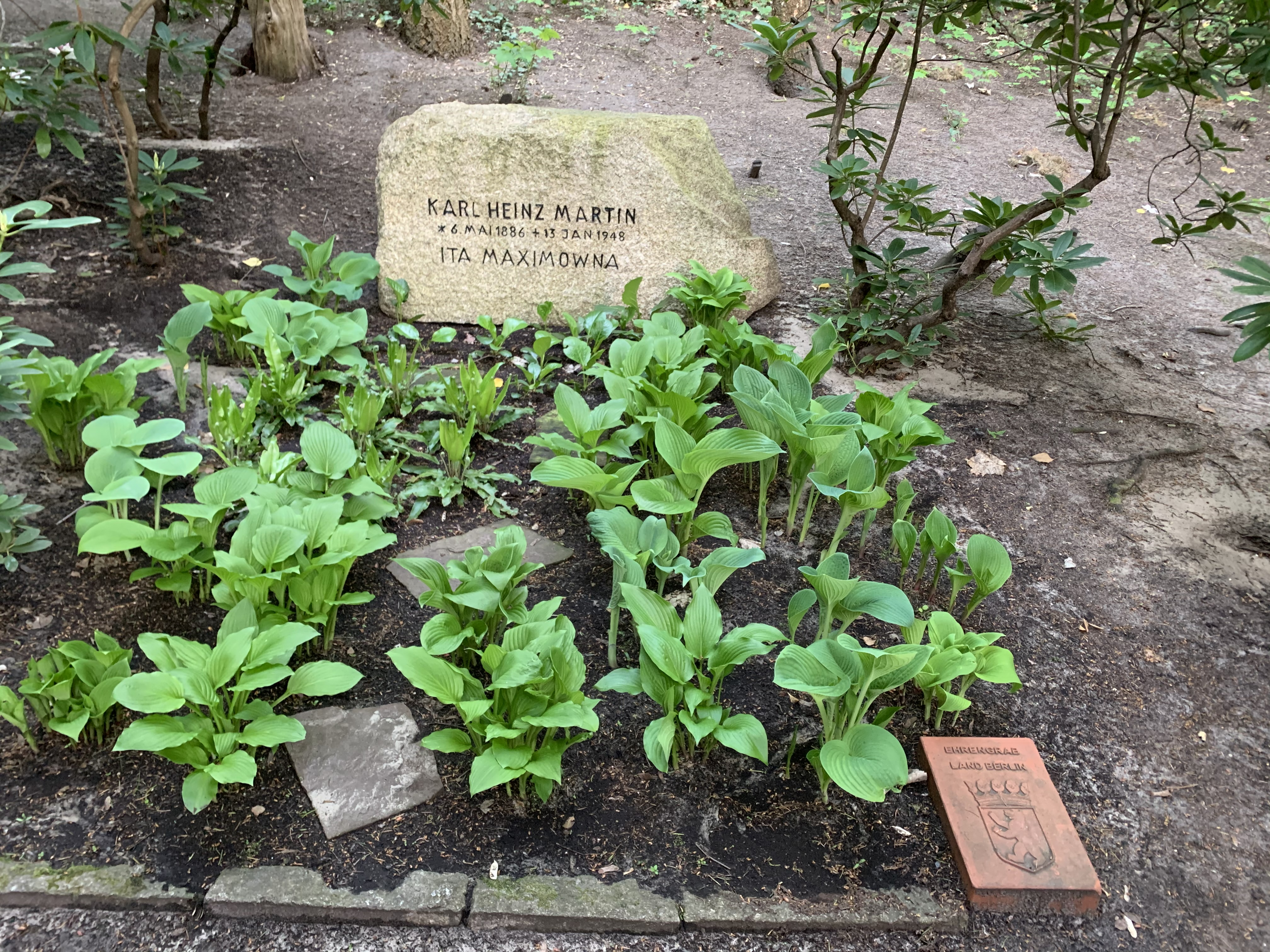
Grave of Ita Maximowna on the Friedhof Heerstraße in Berlin-Westend

Ita Maximowna died on 8 April 1988 in Berlin. She is buried with her partner in an honorary grave on the Friedhof Heerstraße in Berlin-Westend.

Her artistic legacy is kept in the Ita-Maximowna-Archiv of the Archiv für Darstellende Kunst of the Akademie der Künste in Berlin.

== Awards ==
- Berliner Kunstpreis 1953 (for Die Zauberflöte)
- Order of Merit of the Federal Republic of Germany, 5 March 1987, by Richard von Weizsäcker

== Productions ==
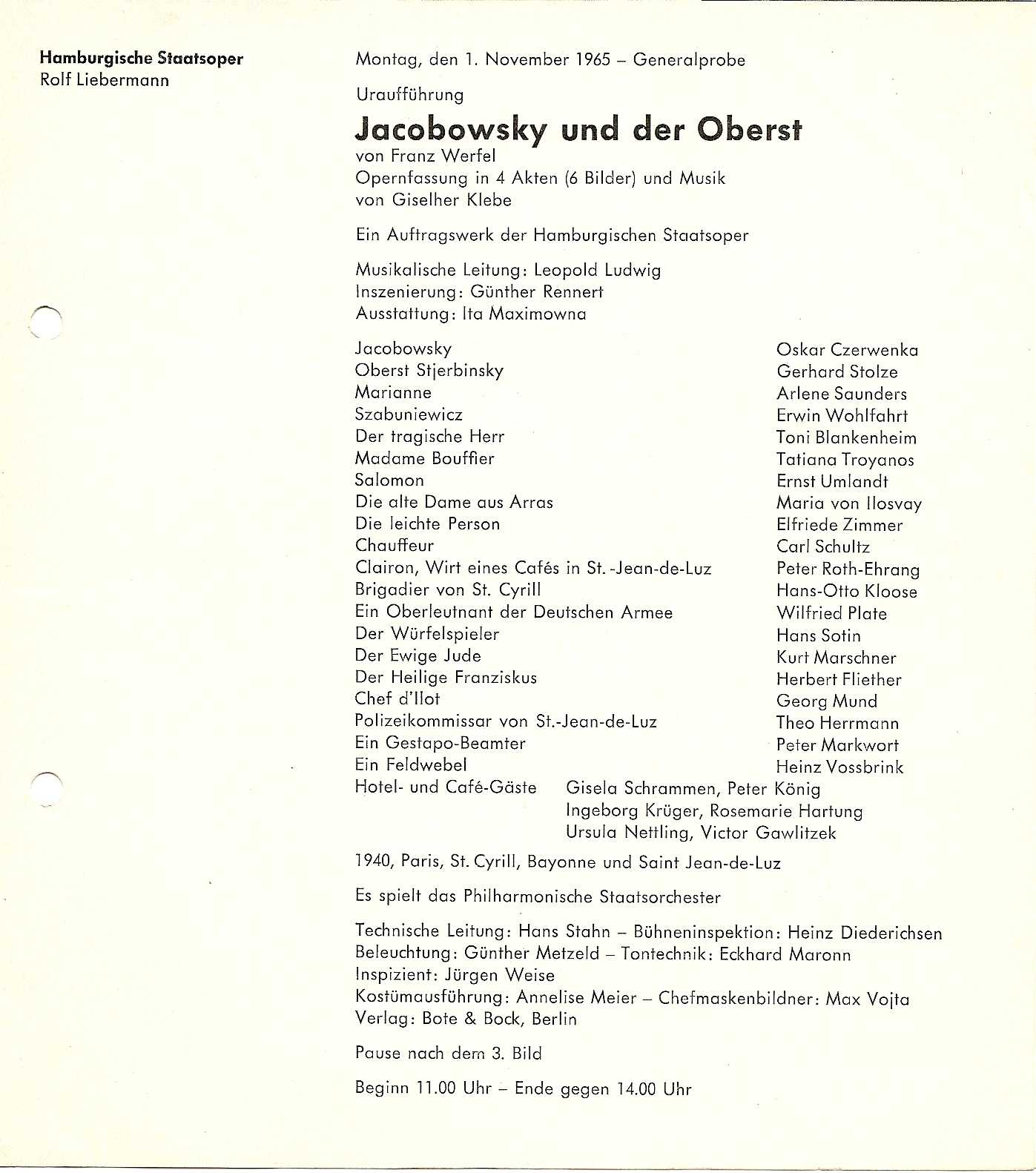
Playbill for Klebe's opera Jacobowsky und der Oberst (1965)

Maximowna designed stage and costumes for around 400 productions of operas and plays. Her first production was a double bill of Arthur Schnitzler's Grüner Kakadu and Franz Werfel's Kammersänger at the Berlin Renaissance Theatre in 1945. In 1953, she designed Mozart's Die Zauberflöte for the Städtische Oper Berlin, directed by Rennert. In 1955, she designed the work for Oper Frankfurt, conducted by Georg Solti.

For the Vienna State Opera, she created sets for Salome by Richard Strauss (1957), Mozart's Le nozze di Figaro (1958), Rossini's La Cenerentola and Il turco in Italia, and Verdi's Un ballo in maschera (1982). She designed the scene at the Salzburg Festival for Le nozze di Figaro from 1957, Die Zauberflöte from 1959, Ariadne auf Naxos by Richard Strauss from 1964, and Mozart's Così fan tutte from 1972, all directed by Rennert. The 1972 production was conducted by Karl Böhm.

In 1962, she made her debut at the Metropolitan Opera in New York City, designing Verdi's Un ballo in maschera, conducted by Nello Santi who also made his debut, with Leonie Rysanek and Carlo Bergonzi in the leading roles. A reviewer called her "one of the most sensitive and imaginative of contemporary designers". The same year, she designed for Puccini's Der Mantel (Il tabarro) at the Staatstheater Stuttgart, conducted by Ferdinand Leitner. In 1965, she designed for the world premiere of Klebe's Jacobowsky und der Oberst at the Hamburg State Opera.

== Costume and stage designs ==
Maximowna's designs have been described as "luftig-poetisch" (airy and poetic).

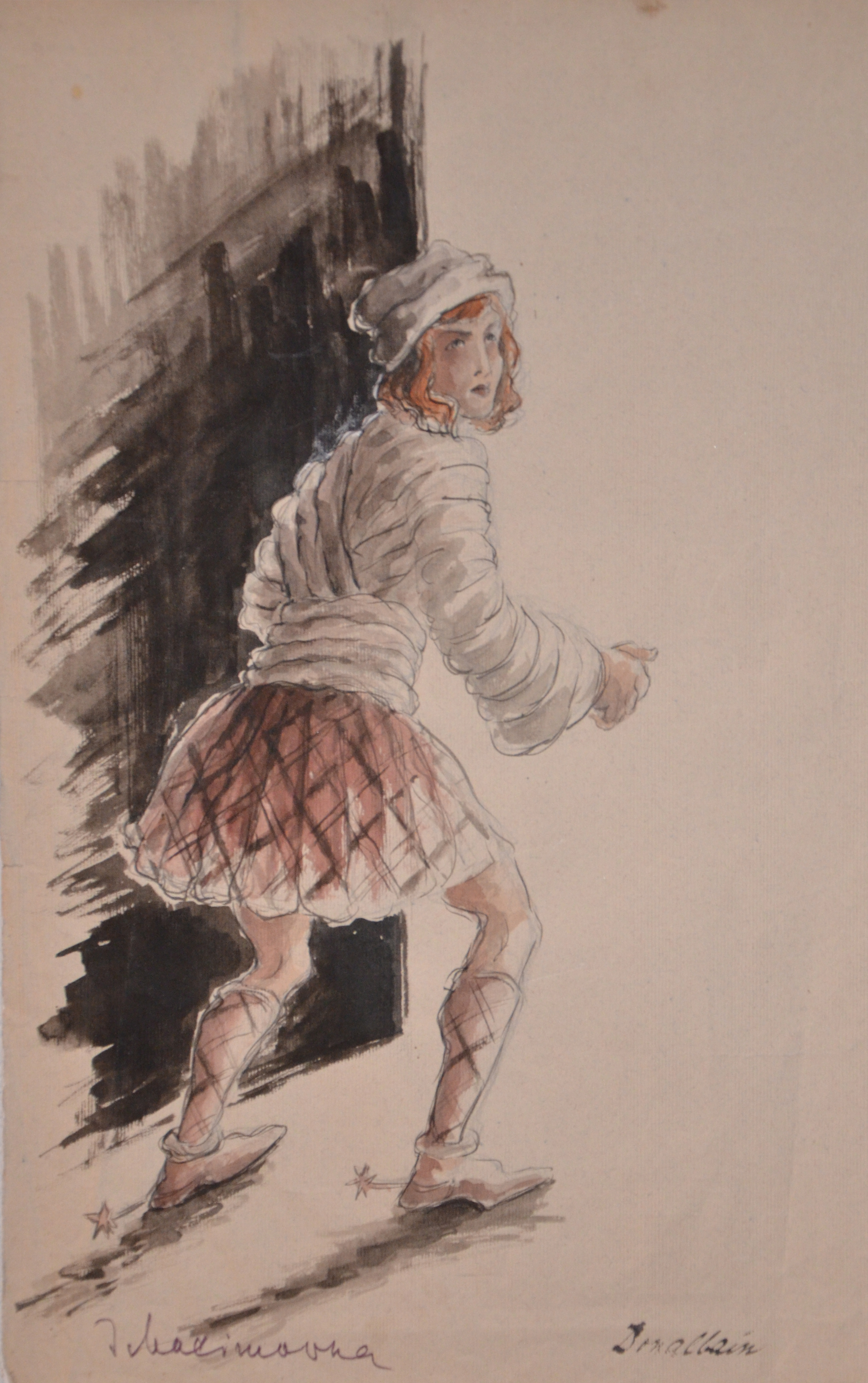
Donalbain, Macbeth, Hebbel-Theater, Berlin (1945)

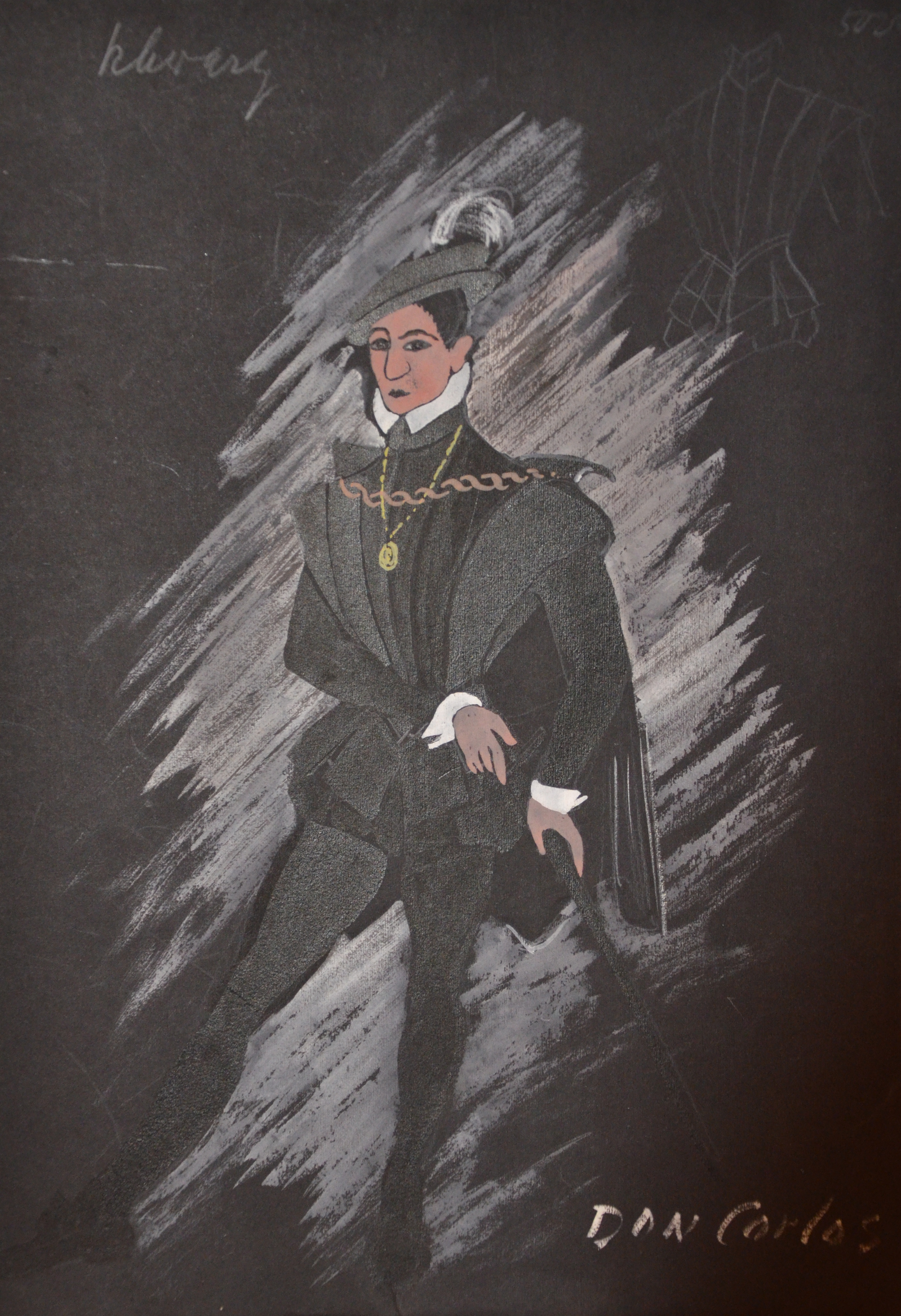
Don Carlos, opening Theater Bonn (1950)

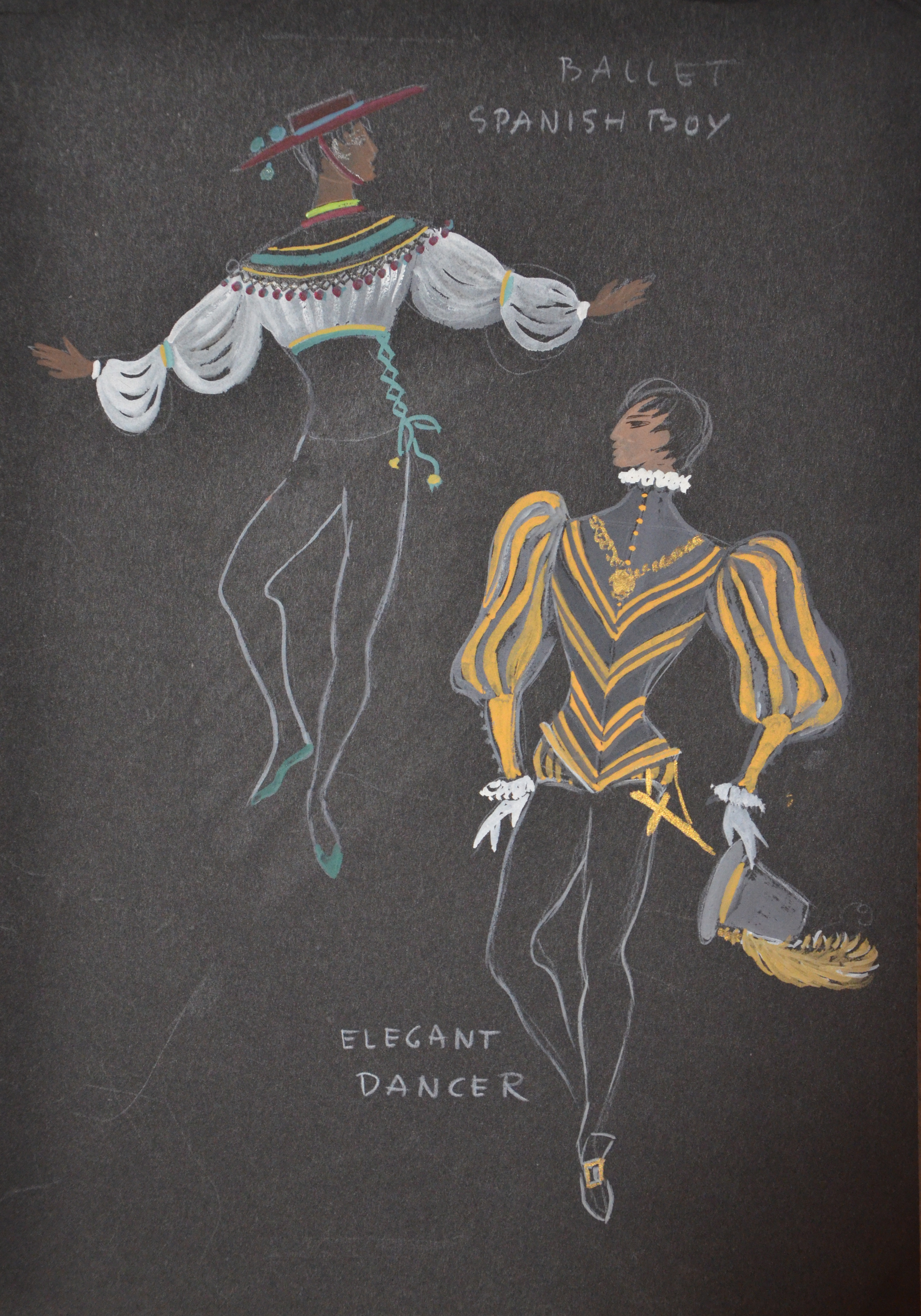
Don Giovanni, Teatro Colón (1963)

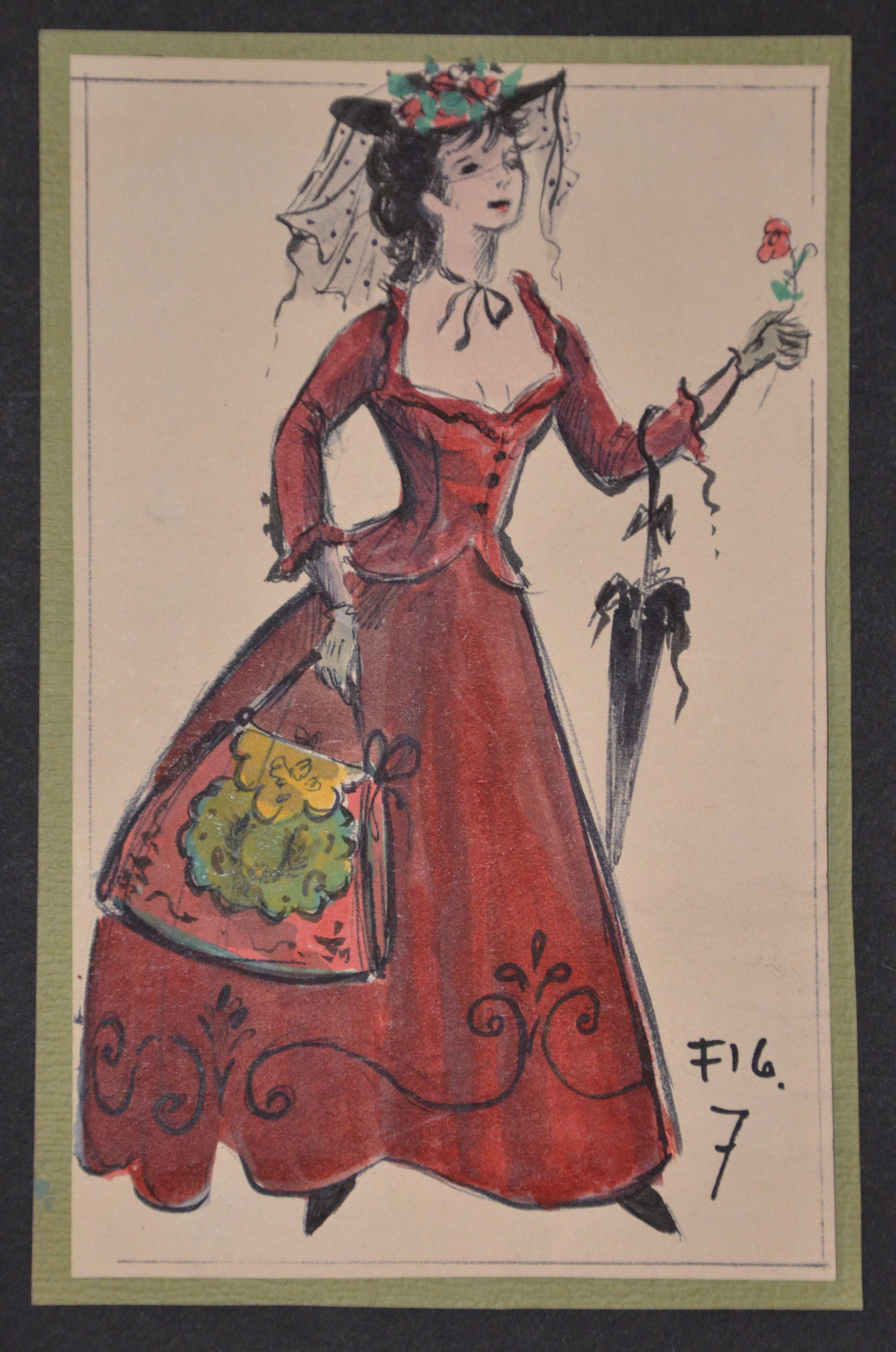
Georgette, Il tabarro, Bavarian State Opera (1973)

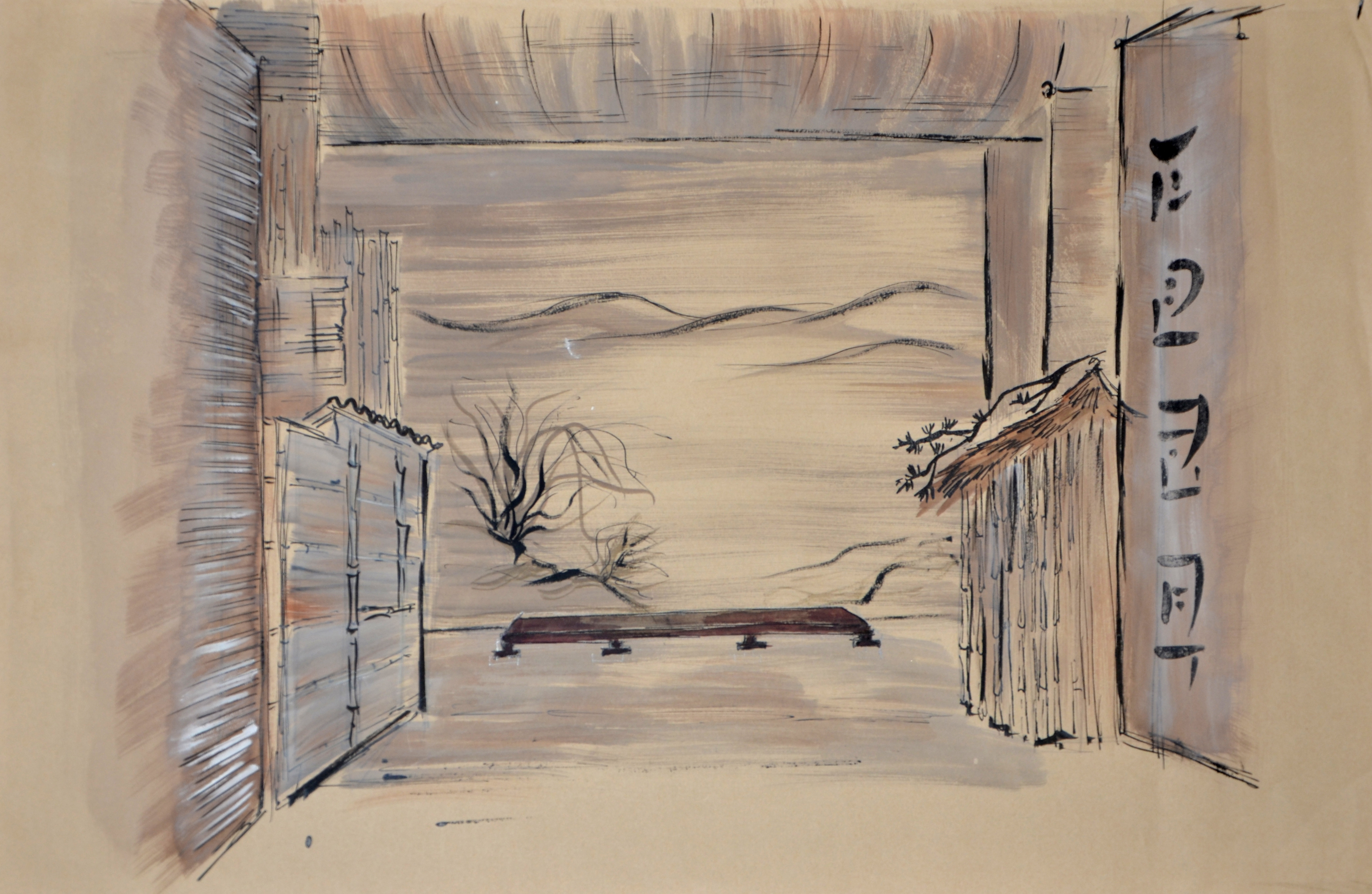
Das kleine Teehaus, Renaissance-Theater, Berlin (1954)

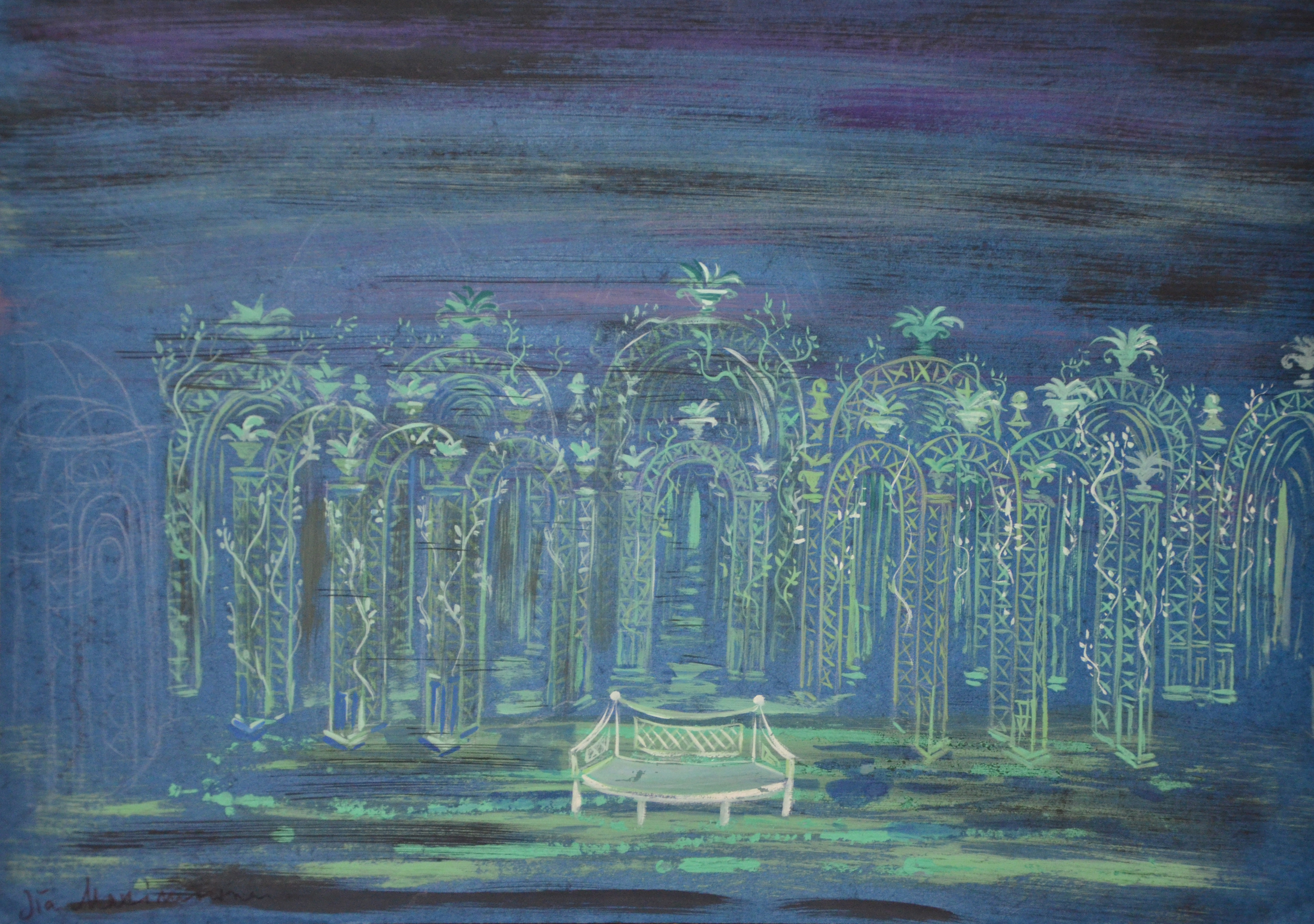
Le nozze di Figaro, Vienna State Opera (1958)
