= Johannes Fritzsch =

German conductor (born 1960)

Johannes Fritzsch (born 1960 in Meissen, East Germany) is a German conductor.

== Biography ==
Fritzsch's father, a cantor and organist, was his first music teacher, in piano and organ. His brother Georg Fritzsch (born 1963) is also a conductor. His other brother, Rainer Fritzsch (born 1974), is a cantor in Radeberg.

Fritzsch continued his musical studies on violin and trumpet. He attended the Carl Maria von Weber Music Academy in Dresden, studying conducting, piano and trumpet. In 1982, Fritzsch took his first conducting post, as second Kapellmeister at the Rostock People's Theatre, where his conducting duties included the first East German performances of Hans Werner Henze's The English Cat in 1986. From 1987 to 1992, Fritzsch was a Kapellmeister with the Staatsoper Dresden, Semperoper.

From 1992 to 1993, he was first Kapellmeister at the Staatsoper Hannover. From 1993 to 1999, he served as music director and chief conductor at the Städtische Bühnen and the Philharmonisches Orchester in Freiburg. He was Generalmusikdirektor (GMD) of the Staatsoper Nürnberg in the 2005/2006 season. In Austria, he became chief conductor of the Graz Philharmonic Orchestra and the Graz Opera in 2006. In January 2013, Fritzsch resigned his Graz posts, effective at the end of January 2013.

Fritzsch made his first conducting appearance in Australia in 1992 for an Opera Australia production of Hänsel und Gretel. He conducted a recording of Richard Strauss' tone poems with The Queensland Orchestra (TQO). In July 2007, Fritzsch was named chief conductor of the TQO for an initial contract of three years, beginning in 2008. His first concert as the TQO's chief conductor was in March 2008. In February 2010, the orchestra, whose name reverted to its former name of the Queensland Symphony Orchestra in 2010, announced the extension of Fritzsch's contract as chief conductor for another three years, through 2013. He stood down as chief conductor of the QSO at the end of 2014. Following the conclusion of his QSO chief conductorship, Fritzsch took the title of conductor laureate of the QSO. In February 2021, the QSO announced the return of Fritzsch to the orchestra as its new principal conductor and artistic adviser, with a contract until 2023. He took the title of principal guest conductor of the QSO in 2023, and is scheduled to revert to his title of conductor laureate of the QSO in 2024.

In 2001, Fritzsch first guest-conducted the Tasmanian Symphony Orchestra (TSO). In April 2017, the TSO announced the appointment of Fritzsch as its first-ever principal guest conductor, effective January 2018, with an initial contract of three years. Fritzsch has recorded commercially with the TSO for Hyperion Records.

In 1999, Fritzsch married Susan Collins, then the deputy concertmaster of the Sydney Opera House orchestra. They have three daughters. The family resides in Hobart.

== Awards and nominations ==
=== ARIA Music Awards ===
The ARIA Music Awards are presented annually from 1987 by the Australian Recording Industry Association (ARIA).

Year	Nominee / work	Award	Result	Ref.
2018	Into Silence: Part|Vasks|Gorecki|Pelecis (with Tamara Anna Cislowska & Tasmanian Symphony Orchestra)	Best Classical Album	Nominated	
2026	Elena Kats-Chernin: Ancient Letters (Tamara-Anna Cislowska & Tasmanian Symphony Orchestra)	Best Classical Album	Nominated	

Cultural offices
Preceded by Philippe Auguin	Nürnberg Opera, Generalmusikdirektor; 2005–2006	Succeeded by Christof Perick
Preceded by Philippe Jordan	Graz Opera and Graz Philharmonic Orchestra, Chief Conductor; 2006–2013	Succeeded by Dirk Kaftan
