= Staatstheater Augsburg =

Coordinates: 48.3703°N 10.8925°E

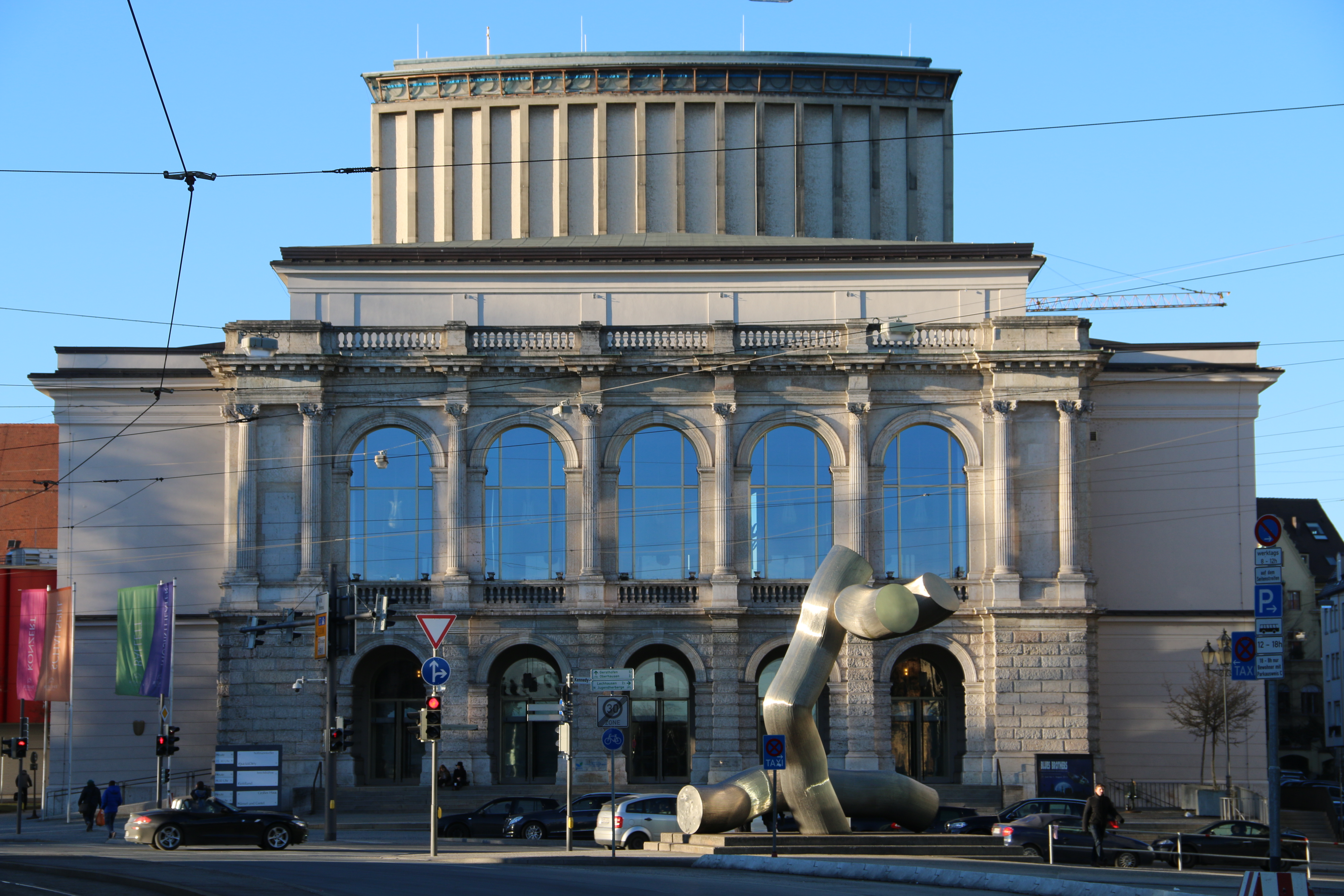
Großes Haus, the largest venue

The Staatstheater Augsburg is a theatre of Augsburg, Germany. Until 1999 it was called Städtische Bühnen Augsburg, from then until the end of August 2018 it was called Theater Augsburg. It offers on four stages musical theatre, plays and ballet, with its own choir and the orchestra Augsburg Philharmonic.

== History ==
Public theatre in Augsburg dates back to 1630, when the Meistersinger initiated plays in the Welserstadel. The first opera was performed in 1696 or 1697, conducted by Johann Sigismund Kusser aufgeführt. The Stadttheater opened in 1776 and offered a stage for guest ensembles. Wolfgang Amadeus Mozart visited the theatre in October 1777. His opera Don Giovanni was performed already in 1787, the year of the premiere, Die Zauberflöte followed on 21 January 1793. Emanuel Schikaneder was the director several times.

On 1 January 1876, the Magistrat decided for a new theatre building. The first performance in the Großes Haus was Beethoven's Fidelio on 26 November 1877. Notable musical directors were István Kertész (1958–1963) and Bruno Weil (1981–1989), among others. In 1999 the theatre became a municipal Eigenbetrieb. Since 1 September 2018 Theatre Augsburg is a State Theatre ("Staatstheater Augsburg").

== Conductors ==
Musical directors (Generalmusikdirektor, GMD) have included:

- Fritz Josef Schnell
- 1940–1969: Anton Mooser
- 1958–1963: István Kertész
- 1963–1972: Hans Zanotelli
- 1972–1981: Gabor Ötvös
- 1981–1989: Bruno Weil
- 1989–1994: Michael Luig
- 1994–2002: Peter Leonard
- 2002–2009: Rudolf Piehlmayer
- 2009–2014: Dirk Kaftan
- 2014–2015: Lancelot Fuhry
- from 2015: Domonkos Héja

== Trivia ==
The scene of the book Der Intendant stirbt dramatisch by Peter Garski is the Theater Augsburg. It was performed in a scenic version at the theatre in 2002, with the rock band Waxx.

== Literature ==
- Vom Komödienstadel am Lauterlech zum wiederaufgebauten Stadttheater In: Adressbuch der Stadt Augsburg 1971, 86. Ausgabe, Augsburger Adreßbuchverlag Konrad Arnold, pp 23–28
- Peter Garski: Der Intendant stirbt dramatisch. ISBN 3-941183-01-X.
