= Markus Brutscher =

German tenor in opera and concert

- Born: 18 August 1966 (age 59); Landsberg am Lech, Upper Bavaria, Germany
- Education: Hochschule für Musik "Hanns Eisler"
- Occupation: Operatic tenor
- Website: www.markusbrutscher.com

Markus Brutscher (born 18 August 1966) is a German tenor in opera and concert. His repertoire includes works from the early Baroque to contemporary, although he has been regarded as a specialist in early music.

== Career ==
Born in Landsberg am Lech, Upper Bavaria, Brutscher received his first musical training as a member of the boys' choirs Regensburger Domspatzen and Augsburger Domsingknaben. He studied voice at the Hochschule für Musik "Hanns Eisler" in Berlin with Norma Sharp, in London with Rudolf Piernay und in Maastricht with Mya Besselink.

In May 1993 he performed the role of the Roman governor Lucio Vero in Niccolò Jommelli's Baroque opera Vologeso at the 7th International Festival of Old Music in Stuttgart, conducted by Frieder Bernius. Brutscher has expanded his repertoire with engagements in Brussels, at the National Opera in Paris, at the Teatro Real in Madrid, Opera Abao in Bilbao, and the Stuttgart State Opera.

Brutscher performed the part of Saul in Reinhard Keiser's oratorio Der siegende David at the Ruhrtriennale 2006. In 2009 he sang in Meran the tenor part of Haydn's oratorio Die Jahreszeiten. He made his London debut in 2009, singing the Narrator in a concert production of Alfred Schnittke's opera Historia von D. Johann Fausten at the Royal Festival Hall, with the London Philharmonic Orchestra conducted Vladimir Jurowski.

Brutscher has collaborated with conductors such as Marc Minkowski, Alessandro de Marci and Thomas Hengelbrock. He has sung and recorded numerous works by Bach, including his Magnificat in E-flat major, BWV 243a, and the Mass in B minor.

== Literature ==
- Karl J. Kutsch and Leo Riemens: Großes Sängerlexikon. Fourth edition. München 2003. Vol. 1: Aarden–Castles, p. 625. ISBN 3-598-11598-9
