= Graz Opera =

Opera house in Graz, Styria, Austria

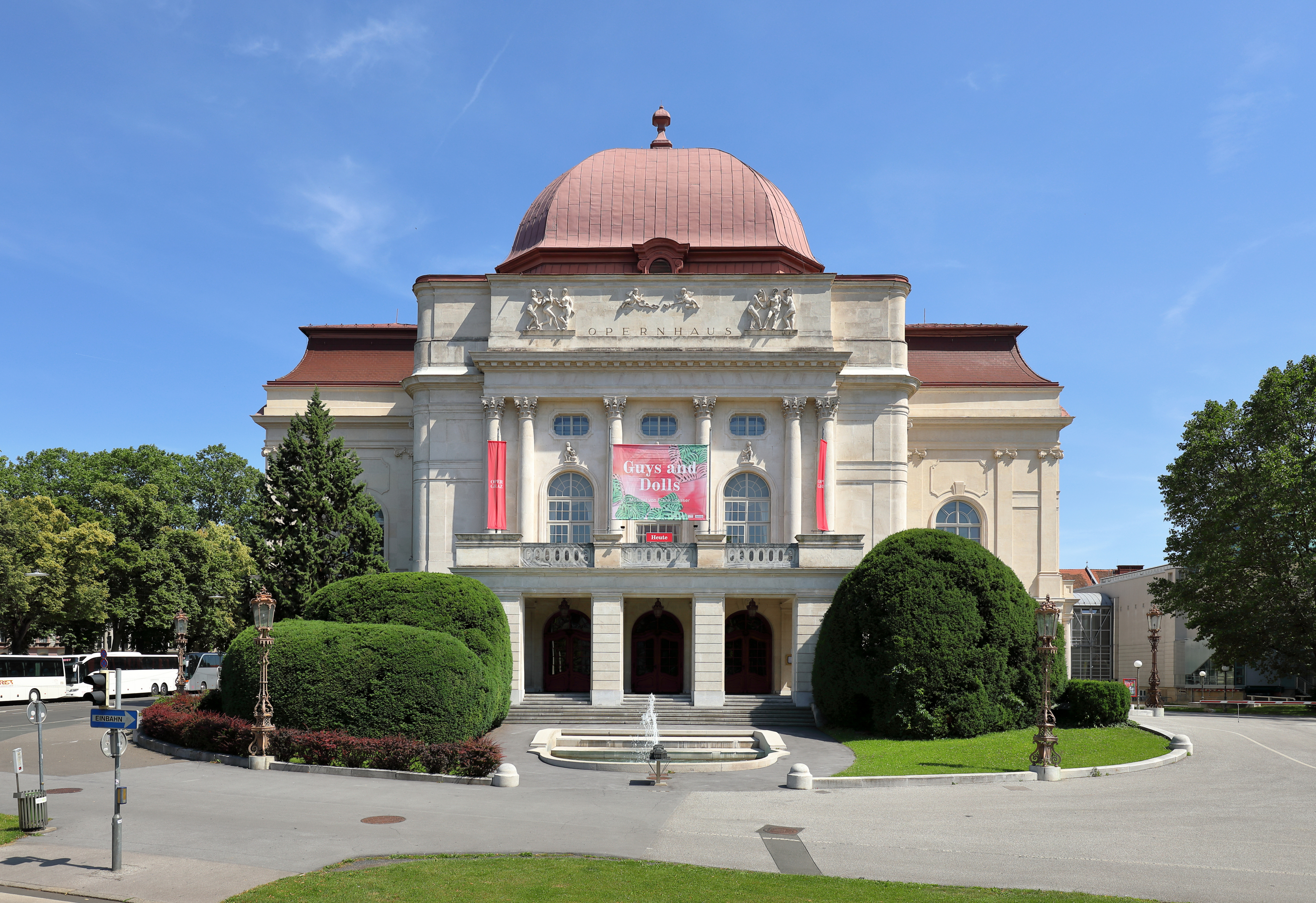
- Graz Opera House, opened in 1899
- Location: Graz, Austria
- Intendant: Ulrich Lenz
- Website: www.oper-graz.com

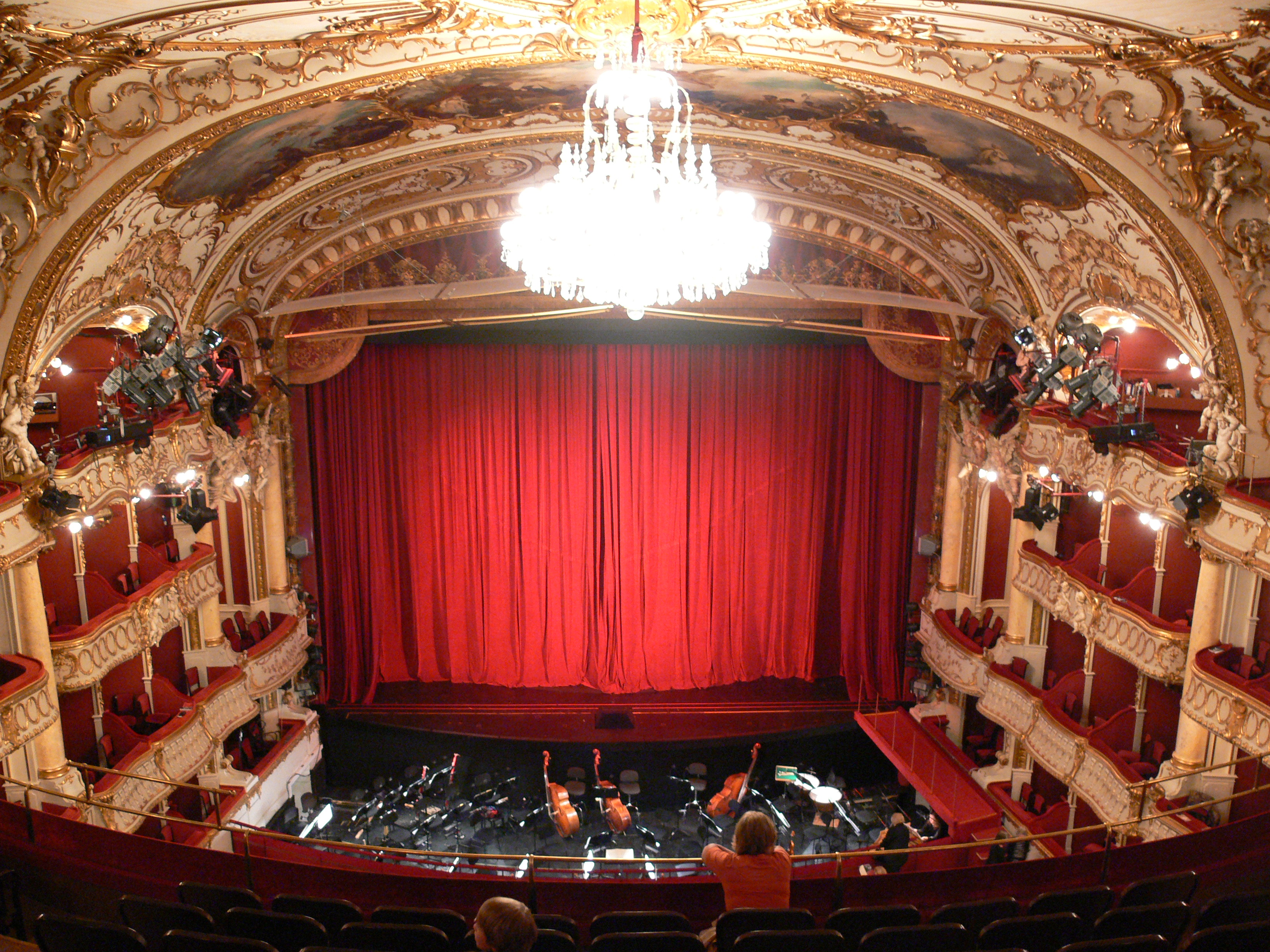
Main auditorium

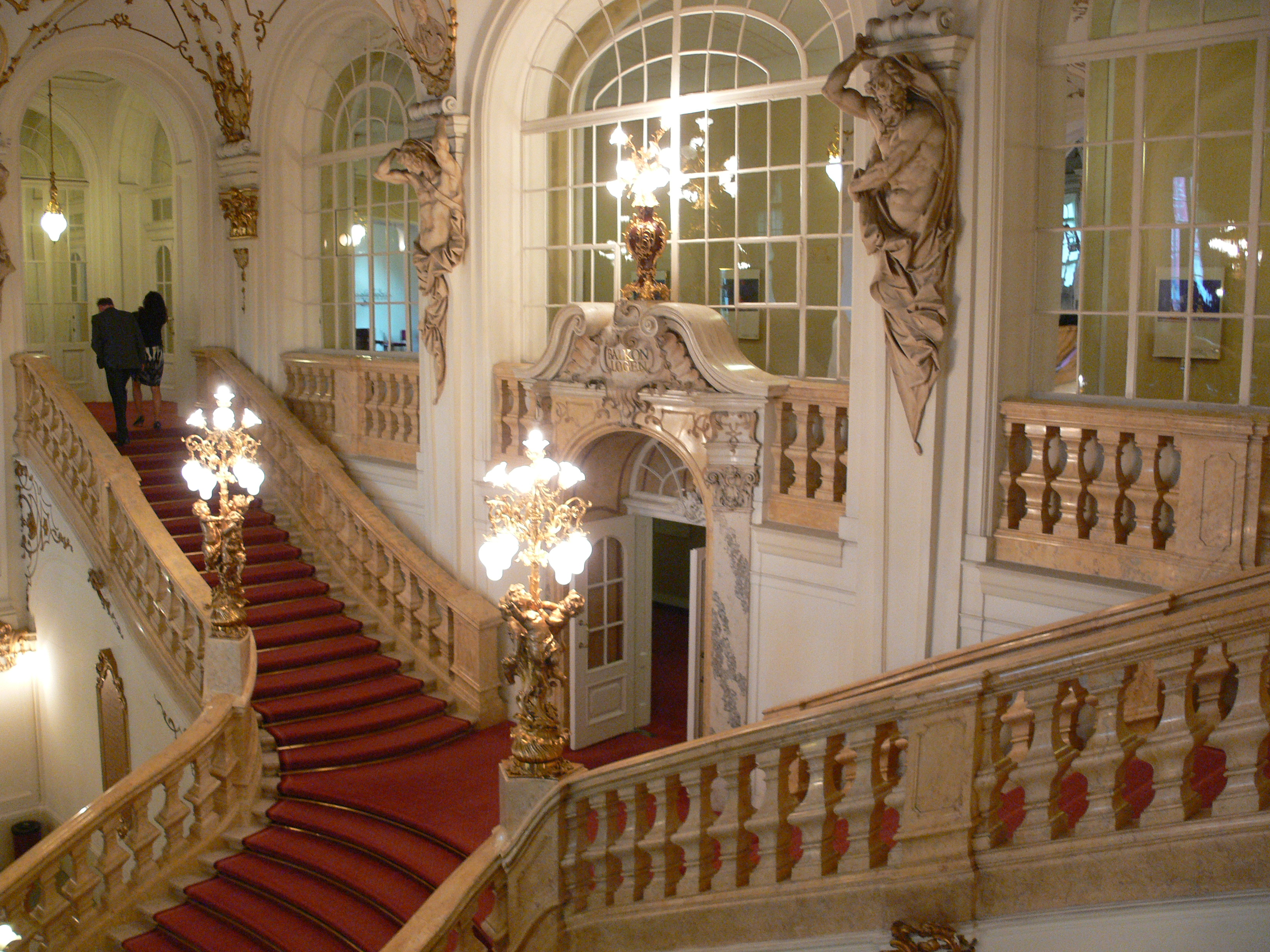
Main stairs

The Graz Opera (German: Oper Graz) is an Austrian opera house and opera company based in Graz. The orchestra of the opera house also performs concerts as the Graz Philharmonic Orchestra (Grazer Philharmonisches Orchester).

== History ==
Opera had been performed in Graz since the 17th century, originally in a converted coach house on the Habsburg royal estates. The National Theatre (Schauspielhaus Graz), constructed in 1776, saw many early performances of Mozart's operas, although today (after many reconstructions) it is devoted to the performances of plays.

The city's first dedicated opera house and the immediate predecessor of the Graz Opera was the Thalia Theatre, adapted in 1864 from an old circus hall. Plans for a new theatre suitable to the growing size and importance of the city and intended to be a "new home for German art" were first proposed in 1887.

Designed by Ferdinand Fellner and Herman Helmer in the neo-baroque style, the Graz Opera was inaugurated in 1899 with a performance of Schiller's play William Tell, followed a few days later by Wagner's opera Lohengrin. The building suffered damage during World War II bombings but was repaired and re-opened after the war. Between 1983 and 1985, it underwent a $15 million renovation which saw the installation of modern equipment and facilities without significantly changing the original exterior and interior of the building. Today, the opera seats around 1,200 people.

The current Intendant of the company is Ulrich Lenz, since 2023.

Past general music directors (GMD) of the company have included Niksa Bareza (1981–1990), Philippe Jordan (2001–2004), Johannes Fritzsch (2006–2013), and Dirk Kaftan (2013–2017). In the autumn of 2016, Oksana Lyniv made her first guest-conducting appearance with the company, in a production of La traviata. In February 2017, the company announced the appointment of Lyniv as its next GMD, effective with the 2017–2018 season. Lyniv is the first female conductor to be named GMD of Graz Opera. She concluded her tenure in Graz at the end of the 2019–2020 season. In December 2018, the company announced the appointment of Roland Kluttig as its next principal conductor, effective with the 2020–2021 season, with an initial contract of 3 seasons. Kluttig is scheduled to conclude his tenure at the close of the 2022–2023 season. In December 2022, the company announced the appointment of Vassilis Christopoulos as its next chief conductor, effective with the 2023–2024 season.

== General Music Directors (GMD; partial list) ==
- Herbert Albert (1950–1952)
- Berislav Klobučar (1960–1971)
- Nikša Bareza (1981–1990)
- Mario Venzago (1991–1994)
- Philippe Jordan (2001–2004)
- Johannes Fritzsch (2006–2013)
- Dirk Kaftan (2013–2017)
- Oksana Lyniv (2017–2020)
- Roland Kluttig (2020–2023)
- Vassilis Christopoulos (2023-present)

== Sources ==
- Stråth, Bo (1999). The Postmodern Challenge. Rodopi. ISBN 90-420-0745-1
