= Oksana Lyniv =

Ukrainian conductor (born 1978)

- Оксана Линів
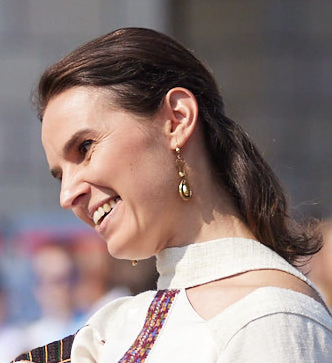
- Lyniv in 2021
- Born: 6 January 1978 (age 48); Brody, Lviv Oblast, Ukrainian SSR, Soviet Union
- Education: Musikhochschule Dresden
- Occupation: Conductor
- Organizations: Youth Symphony Orchestra of Ukraine; Graz Opera; Teatro Comunale di Bologna
- Website: oksanalyniv.com

Oksana Yaroslavivna Lyniv (Ukrainian: Оксана Ярославівна Линів; born 6 January 1978) is a Ukrainian conductor, who is the music director of the Teatro Comunale di Bologna since 2022. She founded the Youth Symphony Orchestra of Ukraine in 2016. On 25 July 2021, she conducted the opening of the Bayreuth Festival, a new production of Der fliegende Holländer, as the first female conductor at the festival.

== Biography ==
Born in Brody (then in the Ukrainian SSR), Lyniv is the daughter of two musicians and the granddaughter of a choral conductor. Her father is also a choral conductor. In her youth, she studied piano, flute, violin and singing. From 1992 to 1996, she studied flute and conducting at the Stanislav Liudkevych Music School in Lviv. She first conducted an orchestra at age 16, which aroused her interest in conducting. From 1996 to 2003, she was a conducting student at the Lysenko music academy in Lviv, where her teachers included Bogdan Dashak. During her studies, Lyniv became an assistant conductor at Lviv Opera to Myron Yusypovych. She became principal guest conductor of the Leopolis Chamber Symphony Orchestra in 2003.

In 2004, Lyniv participated in the first Gustav Mahler conducting competition of the Bamberg Symphony, and won 3rd prize. In 2005, she became assistant conductor to Jonathan Nott at the Bamberg Symphony. From 2005 to 2009, Lyniv continued her music studies at the Musikhochschule Dresden ("Carl Maria von Weber" College of Music). She participated in a masterclass with Ekkehard Klemm in 2007. She held a scholarship from the German Academic Exchange Service (DAAD), the Goethe Institute, and the Oscar and Vera Ritter Foundation. From 2007 to 2009, Lyniv was promoted by the "Dirigentenforum" of the German Music Council. She has taken further master classes in conducting with Hartmut Haenchen, Kurt Masur, Peter Gülke, Georg Fritzsch and Roland Seiffarth.

From 2008 to 2013, Lyniv was associate chief conductor of the Odesa National Opera. She has worked on establishing a national youth orchestra in Ukraine, the Youth Symphony Orchestra of Ukraine. Lyniv served on the conducting staff of the Bavarian State Opera, as an assistant conductor to Kirill Petrenko, from 2013 through 2017. Her work at the Bavarian State Opera has included conducting productions of Mirandolina (Martinů), Die Soldaten (Zimmermann), Selma Ježková (Poul Ruders), and Mauerschau (Hauke Berheide).

In October 2016, Lyniv made her first guest-conducting appearance with Graz Opera, in a production of Verdi's La traviata. Based on this engagement, in February 2017, Graz Opera announced her appointment as the next chief conductor of the Graz Opera and of the Graz Philharmonic Orchestra, effective with the 2017–2018 season, with an initial contract of 3 years. This appointment marks her first chief conductorship. She is the first female conductor to be named chief conductor of the Graz Opera and the Graz Philharmonic Orchestra. She concluded her tenure in Graz at the end of the 2019–2020 season.

In March 2021, Lyniv made her first guest-conducting appearance at the Teatro Comunale di Bologna, in a streamed quarantine concert without an audience. She subsequently guest-conducted at the Teatro Comunale di Bologna in a May 2021 concert with an audience present. On 25 July 2021, Lyniv conducted the first night of the new Bayreuth Festival production of Der fliegende Holländer, the first female conductor ever to conduct at the Bayreuth Festival. In October 2021, the Teatro Comunale di Bologna announced the appointment of Lyniv as its new music director, effective January 2022, with an initial contract of three years. Lyniv is the first female conductor to be named music director of an Italian opera house. In March 2022, Lyniv conducted Ai Weiwei's first opera production, Puccini's Turandot, at the Teatro dell'Opera di Roma with an alternating cast of Oksana Dyka and Ewa Vesin as Turandot, and Michael Fabiano and Marco Spotti as Calaf.

In the 2024 and 2026 seasons, she conducted Turandot at the Metropolitan Opera.

== Awards ==
- 2021 The Saxon Mozart Prize to Youth Symphony Orchestra of Ukraine (YsOU) and its conductor Lyniv
- 2022 Helena Vaz da Silva European Award
- 2024 Bavarian Constitution Order

Cultural offices
Preceded by Dirk Kaftan	Generalmusikdirektorin, Graz Opera; 2017–2020	Succeeded by Roland Kluttig
Preceded by Michele Mariotti	Music Director, Teatro Comunale di Bologna; 2022–present	Succeeded by incumbent
