= Martin Wistinghausen =

German composer

Martin Wistinghausen (born 22 February 1979) is a German composer and bass singer.

== Life ==
Born in Düsseldorf, Wistinghausen studied singing (Kurt Moll, Rudolf Piernay), voice pedagogy, musical composition (Ernst Bechert, Ulrich Leyendecker), German Studies and History (Magister) in Cologne, Mannheim and Düsseldorf. Most recently he received a scholarship from the German Academic Exchange Service to study composition with Adriana Hölszky at the Salzburg Mozarteum. He also attended master classes with Dietrich Fischer-Dieskau. (singing) and Salvatore Sciarrino (composition).

He performed with renowned ensembles such as the Basler Madrigalisten and L'arpa festante and received a number of commissions for compositions.

His works have been performed at numerous festivals, on the radio (SWR, Deutschlandradio Kultur, Espace 2) and have been interpreted by renowned ensembles such as the "Österreichisches Ensemble für Neue Musik", the "Neue Vocalsolisten", the "Gémeaux Quartett" and the Dresdner Ensemble Auditivvokal Dresden.

At Theater & Orchester Heidelberg as well as in the context of the "3rd Rheinsberger Opernwerkstatt" 2008, scenic works by him were performed. He is a founding member and singer of the sextet Komponistenverschwörung, which was founded in 2008.

== Awards and scholarships ==
- numerous prizes at "Jugend komponiert" and "Jugend musiziert" 1993–1997
- Composition prize of the "Berliner Cappella" 2005
- Netzwerk „Junge Ohren“-Preis für das „Neue Wunderhorn“ 2007
- Prize winner of the International Singing Competition of the Chamber Opera Schloss Rheinsberg (2007/08)
- Promotion prize in the Salzburg composition competition "vocal arts" 2009
- Scholarships from the Walter Kaminsky Foundation, the DAAD, the Richard Wagner Association, the International Bach Academy Stuttgart as well as the Konrad Adenauer Foundation (artist scholarship 2009)
- Selection "Call for scores" "L'arsenale" and "New vocal soloists" (2011)
- Artist scholarship "Kleiner Markgräflerhof" Basel (2014)
- Selection "Call for scores" "Risuonanze" (2015)
- Cantor/church music composition scholarship of the city of Düsseldorf (2017)
- Residency scholarship at the Künstlerhaus Schloss Wiepersdorf (2018)
- Sponsorship award for music of the State Capital Düsseldorf 2019

== Work ==
- Due sonetti di Dante for bass voice and piano (2002)
- Sarastro's Farewell (two opera scenes after J. W. Goethe's fragment "The Magic Flute second part") for soprano, baritone, bass and ten instruments (2003/04)
- 5 Lieder for soprano and piano (texts: E. Lasker-Schüler and G. Trakl) (2003/04)
- Lamentations of Jeremiah in three parts (2003/04) for mixed choir
- Johanna-Trilogy (after texts by F. Schiller and C.de Pisan) for mezzo-soprano, baritone, oboe d'amore, violin, percussion and piano (2005)
- Adieu, adieu Engel... Five attempts at a musical approach to Mozart for alto and string orchestra (2005/06)
- Passacaglia oscura for large flute, pianoforte, percussion, violin, viola and violoncello (2007)
- 3 times 11 moves for an instrumental 5-piece team (saxophone, trumpet, drums, electric guitar and pianoforte) (2008)
- Fahrt im Dunkeln (opera scene based on a text by G.Eich) (2008) for soprano, mezzo-soprano, alto, tenor, clarinet, percussion, pianoforte and strings
- Four Poetic Sketches for bass voice, clarinet and guitar (2005/08) (text: Pierre G. Pouthier, Else Lasker-Schüler, Georg Trakl)
- Traumgesänge for 6 solo voices (2009) (text: Günter Eich, Ingeborg Bachmann)
- Contra-Punkte for string quartet (2009)
- Teddy Brumm - a musical bear story for a narrator and orchestra (2010) (text: Nils Werner) - Commissioned by the Komische Oper Berlin
- Tracks for bass voice and violoncello (2010/11) (text: Robert Walser, Ingeborg Bachmann, Ernst Jandl, Peter Hille, Paul Celan)
- Duo for violin and guitar (2011)
- Träume for tenor, baritone and ensemble (2011) (text: Ingeborg Bachmann, Günter Eich)
- Lamentationes for bass voice and organ (2012)
- Schatten Rosen Schatten for soprano, flute and violin (2012)
- Es ist genug - Gethsemane Reflections for solos, choir, orchestra and organ (2013/2014) (text: New Testament, Rainer Maria Rilke, Friedrich Hölderlin - Collaboration text design: Erika Ria Otto)
- Jerusalem for 5 voices a cappella (2013/2014) (text: Old Testament)
- Rosengesänge for vocal quartet and accordion (2015) (text: Ingeborg Bachmann, Shiki Masaoka, Federico Garcia Lorca, William Blake, Yosa Buson)
- 5 Mannemer Chorskizzen for male choir and mixed choir based on texts and music by Friedrich Schiller and Wolfgang Amadeus Mozart (2015)
- amore langueo for clarinet, violin and piano after texts from the "Hohelied" (2016)
- Schlaf worden – four Bach reflections for speaker, choir and instrumental ensemble (texts: Johann Franck, Barthold Heinrich Brockes, Daniel Czepko von Reigersfeld) (2016/17)
- Lux in tenebris for four choir groups and two organs (2015/2017)
- Wasser-Bilder for solo voices (S/T/B), three choir groups, flute, violoncello, percussion and organ (2018) (text: Old Testament, Günter Eich, W. Szymborska, Ingeborg Bachmann)
- Lamentationes for soprano solo
