= Matthias Kuntzsch =

Matthias Kuntzsch, born 22. September 1935, is a German-born conductor living in the United States. Earlier in his career in Germany, he was principal conductor of the Bonn Theater, Nationaltheater Mannheim, Hamburg State Opera, and Nationaltheater Munich, and music director of the Opera and Symphony of Lübeck and the State Theater and Orchestra of the Saarland, Saarbrücken.

He and his family moved to the United States in 1989. He is currently musical director of the Bay Area Summer Opera Theater Institute (BASOTI). In 1993 he conducted the Utah Symphony and Opera in Mozart's The Magic Flute. He married Sylvia Anderson and has two children. He also has three grandchildren.
