= Hochschule für Musik und Darstellende Kunst Mannheim =

University in Mannheim, Germany

Coordinates: 49.4838°N 8.4708°E

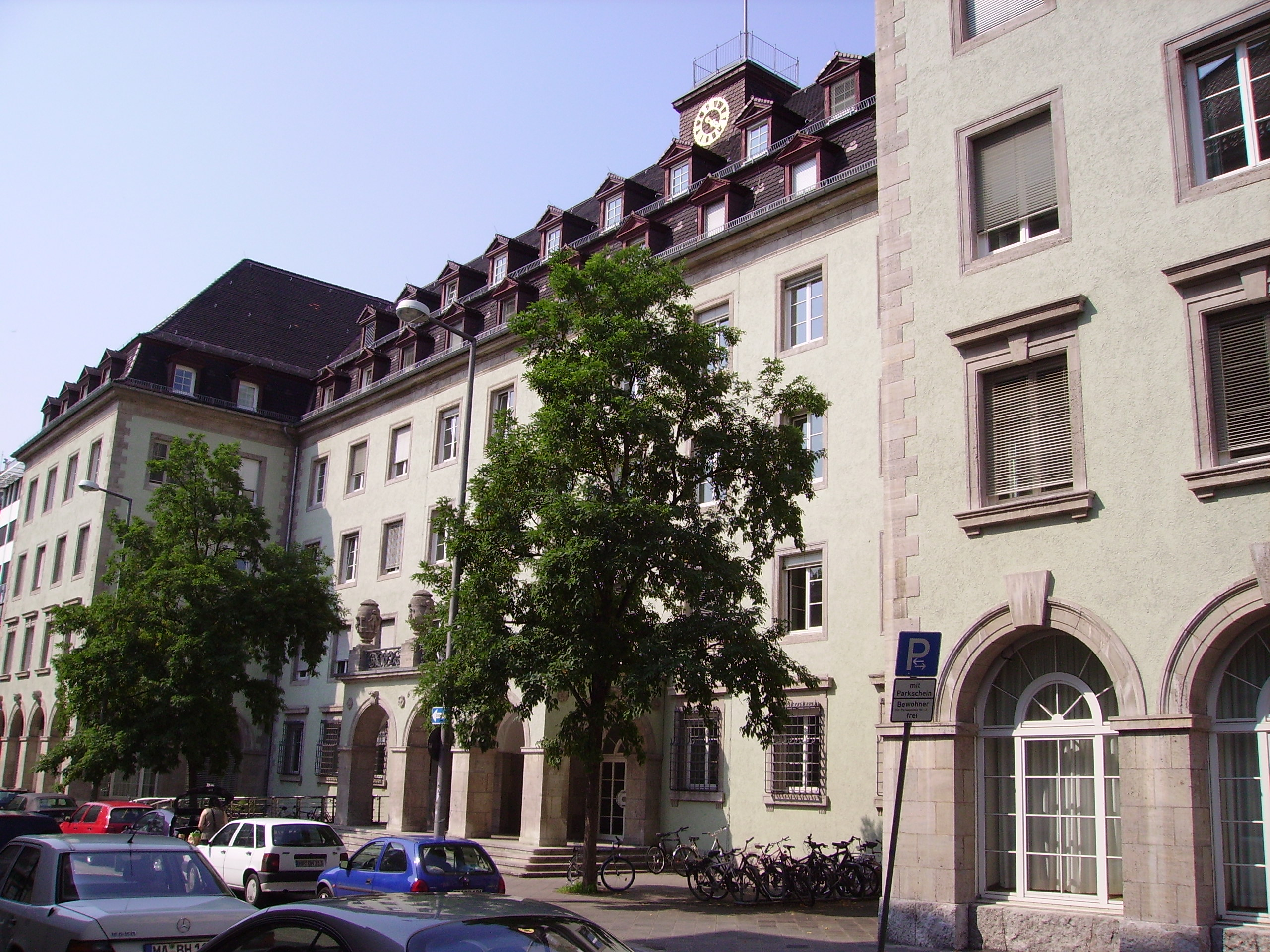
The Hochschule

The Staatliche Hochschule für Musik und Darstellende Kunst Mannheim is a Hochschule, a university for music and performing arts in Mannheim, Germany, of the state Baden-Württemberg

== History ==
The Hochschule dates back to the 1762 Academie de Danse and the private Tonschule (Sound school), founded in 1776 at the court of Charles Theodore, Elector of Bavaria. They were later named Mannheimer Konservatorium and Städtische Hochschule für Musik und Theater. In 1971 the Heidelberger Konservatorium, founded in 1894, was included in a combined Hochschule with university status, run by the state Baden-Württemberg.

=== Graduate studies ===
- Artistic education
- Music pedagogy
- School music
- Music research, media
- Jazz / Pop music
- Dance
- Dance pedagogy for children

=== Postgraduate studies ===
- Solo
- Orchestra solo
- Dance pedagogy for professional dancers
- Artistic development (dance/stage)

== Library ==
The library contains around 17,500 books, 45,200 musical pieces and 11,000 recordings.
