= January 6 =

List of notable occurrences on this date

January 6 this year in various calendars
- Tuesday, 6 January 2026
Akan	Nwonabene
Armenian	20 Arach 1475
Aztec	Huei Tozoztli 16, 10 Cuetzpalin
Babylonian	16 Kislimu, 2336 SE
Balinese pawukon	Menga, Beteng, Menala, Pon, Aryang, Anggara of Merakih, Uma, Jangur, Pandita
Bengali	22 Poush, BS 1432
Chinese	Yang Metal Dragon・Wings Mansion; Wood Snake Year, Month 11, Day 18 (Xiaohan, 14 days until Dahan)
Common Era	6 January 2026 CE
Coptic	28 Koiak, AM 1742
Egyptian	25 Pachon, 2774 NE
Ethiopian	28 Tākḫśāś, 2018 Amätä Məhrät
French Republican	Décade II, Septidi de Nivôse de l'Année 234 de la République
Gregorian	6 January, AD 2026
Hebrew	17 Tevet, AM 5786
Hindu	Āśleṣā・Viṣkambha; Solar: 22 Pauṣa, 1947 SE; Lunisolar: Tr̥tīyā, Kṛishna pakṣa of Pauṣa, 2082 VE; Siddhārthin・5126 KY・1,872,581
Icelandic	Þriðjudagur, 14 Mörsugur 2025
Islamic	17 Rajab, AH 1447 (using tabular method)
ISO week date	2026-W02-2
Japanese	18 Shimotsuki, Reiwa 8 (Shōkan, 14 days until Daikan)
Julian	24 December, AD 2025 (AM 7535)
Julian day	2461047
Korean	18 Jwidal, 4358 DE
Maya	13.0.13.4.4; 2 Muan, 10 Kan
Roman	ante diem IX Kalendas Ianuarias, MMDCCLXXIX AUC
Solar Hijri	16 Dey, SH 1404
Tibetan	18 mgo, shing mo sbrul 2152 or 1771 or 999

<<	January					>>
Su	Mo	Tu	We	Th	Fr	Sa
				1	2	3
4	5	6	7	8	9	10
11	12	13	14	15	16	17
18	19	20	21	22	23	24
25	26	27	28	29	30	31
2026

January 6 in recent years
2026 (Tuesday)
2025 (Monday)
2024 (Saturday)
2023 (Friday)
2022 (Thursday)
2021 (Wednesday)
2020 (Monday)
2019 (Sunday)
2018 (Saturday)
2017 (Friday)

January 6 is the sixth day of the year in the Gregorian calendar; 359 days remain until the end of the year (360 in leap years).

== Events ==
=== Pre-1600 ===
- 1066 – Following the death of Edward the Confessor on the previous day, the Witan meets to confirm Harold Godwinson as the new King of England; Harold is crowned the same day, sparking a succession crisis that will eventually lead to the Norman conquest of England.
- 1205 – Philip of Swabia undergoes a second coronation as King of the Romans.
- 1322 – Stephen Uroš III is crowned King of Serbia, having defeated his half-brother Stefan Konstantin in battle. His son is crowned "young king" in the same ceremony.
- 1355 – Charles IV of Bohemia is crowned with the Iron Crown of Lombardy as King of Italy in Milan.
- 1449 – Constantine XI is crowned Byzantine Emperor at Mystras.
- 1492 – The Catholic Monarchs Ferdinand and Isabella enter Granada at the conclusion of the Granada War.
- 1536 – The first European school of higher learning in the Americas, Colegio de Santa Cruz de Tlatelolco, is founded by Viceroy Antonio de Mendoza and Bishop Juan de Zumárraga in Mexico City.
- 1540 – King Henry VIII of England marries Anne of Cleves.
- 1579 – The Union of Arras unites the southern Netherlands under the Duke of Parma (Ottavio Farnese), governor in the name of King Philip II of Spain.

=== 1601–1900 ===
- 1641 – Arauco War: The first Parliament of Quillín is celebrated, putting a temporary hold on hostilities between Mapuches and Spanish in Chile.
- 1661 – English Restoration: The Fifth Monarchists unsuccessfully attempt to seize control of London, England. The revolt is suppressed after a few days.
- 1721 – The Committee of Inquiry on the South Sea Bubble publishes its findings, revealing details of fraud among company directors and corrupt politicians.
- 1724 – Sie werden aus Saba alle kommen, BWV 65, a Bach cantata, for Epiphany, is performed the first time.
- 1725 – J. S. Bach leads the first performance of Liebster Immanuel, Herzog der Frommen, BWV 123, a chorale cantata for Epiphany.
- 1781 – In the Battle of Jersey, the British defeat the last attempt by France to invade Jersey in the Channel Islands.
- 1809 – Combined British, Portuguese and colonial Brazilian forces begin the Invasion of Cayenne during the Napoleonic Wars.
- 1838 – Alfred Vail and colleagues demonstrate a telegraph system using dots and dashes (this is the forerunner of Morse code).
- 1839 – The Night of the Big Wind, the most damaging storm in 300 years, sweeps across Ireland, damaging or destroying more than 20% of the houses in Dublin.
- 1900 – Second Boer War: Having already besieged the fortress at Ladysmith, Boer forces attack it, but are driven back by British defenders.

=== 1901–present ===
- 1912 – New Mexico is admitted to the Union as the 47th U.S. state.
- 1912 – German geophysicist Alfred Wegener first presents his theory of continental drift.
- 1929 – King Alexander of the Serbs, Croats and Slovenes suspends his country's constitution, starting the January 6th Dictatorship.
- 1929 – Mother Teresa arrives by sea in Calcutta, India, to begin her work among India's poorest and sick people.
- 1941 – United States President Franklin D. Roosevelt delivers his Four Freedoms speech in the State of the Union address.
- 1946 – The first general election ever in Vietnam is held.
- 1947 – Pan American Airlines becomes the first commercial airline to offer a round-the-world ticket.
- 1951 – Korean War: Beginning of the Ganghwa massacre, in the course of which an estimated 200–1,300 South Korean communist sympathizers are slaughtered.
- 1960 – National Airlines Flight 2511 is destroyed in mid-air by a bomb, while en route from New York City to Miami.
- 1960 – The Associations Law comes into force in Iraq, allowing registration of political parties.
- 1967 – Vietnam War: United States Marine Corps and ARVN troops launch "Operation Deckhouse Five" in the Mekong River delta.
- 1968 – Aeroflot Flight 1668 crashes near Olyokminsk, killing 45.
- 1969 – Allegheny Airlines Flight 737 crashes in Lafayette Township, McKean County, Pennsylvania, United States, killing 11.
- 1974 – In response to the 1973 oil crisis, the United States implements the Emergency Daylight Saving Time Energy Conservation Act, switching to permanent daylight saving time for a trial period.
- 1974 – Aeroflot Flight H-75 crashes near Mukachevo, killing 24.
- 1989 – Satwant Singh and Kehar Singh are sentenced to death for conspiracy in the assassination of Prime Minister Indira Gandhi; the two men are executed the same day.
- 1992 – President of Georgia Zviad Gamsakhurdia flees the country as a result of the military coup.
- 1993 – Indian Border Security Force units kill 55 Kashmiri civilians in Sopore, Jammu and Kashmir, in revenge after militants ambushed a BSF patrol.
- 1993 – Four people are killed when Lufthansa CityLine Flight 5634 crashes on approach to Charles de Gaulle Airport in Roissy-en-France, France.
- 1994 – U.S. figure skater Nancy Kerrigan is attacked and injured by an assailant hired by her rival Tonya Harding's ex-husband during the U.S. Figure Skating Championships.
- 1995 – A chemical fire in an apartment complex in Manila, Philippines, leads to the discovery of plans for Project Bojinka, a mass-terrorist attack.
- 2005 – Edgar Ray Killen is indicted for the 1964 murders of Chaney, Goodman, and Schwerner during the American Civil Rights Movement.
- 2005 – A train collision in Graniteville, South Carolina, United States, releases about 60 tons of chlorine gas.
- 2012 – Twenty-six people are killed and 63 wounded when a suicide bomber blows himself up at a police station in Damascus.
- 2017 – Five people are killed and six others injured in a mass shooting at Fort Lauderdale–Hollywood International Airport in Broward County, Florida.
- 2019 – Muhammad V of Kelantan resigns as the Yang di-Pertuan Agong of Malaysia, becoming the first monarch to do so.
- 2021 – Supporters of U.S. president Donald Trump storm the United States Capitol Building to disrupt certification of the 2020 presidential election, resulting in four deaths and evacuation of the U.S. Congress.
- 2025 – Justin Trudeau announces his resignation as leader of the Liberal Party of Canada and Prime Minister of Canada after nine years in office.

== Births ==
=== Pre-1600 ===
- 1256 – Gertrude the Great, German mystic (died 1302)
- 1367 – Richard II of England (died 1400)
- 1384 – Edmund Holland, 4th Earl of Kent (died 1408)
- 1412 – Joan of Arc, French martyr and saint (died 1431)
- 1486 – Martin Agricola, German composer and theorist (died 1556)
- 1488 – Helius Eobanus Hessus, German poet (died 1540)
- 1493 – Olaus Petri, Swedish clergyman (died 1552)
- 1500 – John of Ávila, Spanish mystic and saint (died 1569)
- 1525 – Caspar Peucer, German physician and scholar (died 1602)
- 1538 – Jane Dormer, Duchess of Feria (died 1612)
- 1561 – Thomas Fincke, Danish mathematician and physicist (died 1656)
- 1587 – Gaspar de Guzmán, Count-Duke of Olivares (died 1645)
- 1595 – Claude Favre de Vaugelas, French educator and courtier (died 1650)

=== 1601–1900 ===
- 1617 – Christoffer Gabel, Danish politician (died 1673)
- 1632 – Anne Hamilton, 3rd Duchess of Hamilton, Scottish peeress (died 1716)
- 1655 – Eleonor Magdalene of Neuburg (died 1720)
- 1673 – James Brydges, 1st Duke of Chandos, English academic and politician, Lord Lieutenant of Radnorshire (died 1744)
- 1695 – Giuseppe Sammartini, Italian oboe player and composer (died 1750)
- 1702 – José de Nebra, Spanish composer (died 1768)
- 1714 – Percivall Pott, English surgeon (died 1788)
- 1745 – Jacques-Etienne Montgolfier, French co-inventor of the hot air balloon (died 1799)
- 1766 – José Gaspar Rodríguez de Francia, Paraguayan lawyer and politician, first dictator of Paraguay (died 1840)
- 1785 – Andreas Moustoxydis, Greek historian and philologist (died 1860)
- 1793 – James Madison Porter, American lawyer and politician, 18th United States Secretary of War (died 1862)
- 1795 – Anselme Payen, French chemist and academic (died 1871)
- 1799 – Jedediah Smith, American hunter, explorer, and author (died 1831)
- 1803 – Henri Herz, Austrian pianist and composer (died 1888)
- 1807 – Joseph Petzval, German-Hungarian mathematician and physicist (died 1891)
- 1808 – Joseph Pitty Couthouy, American conchologist and paleontologist (died 1864)
- 1811 – Charles Sumner, American lawyer and politician (died 1874)
- 1822 – Heinrich Schliemann, German archaeologist and businessman (died 1890)
- 1832 – Gustave Doré, French painter and sculptor (died 1883)
- 1838 – Max Bruch, German composer and conductor (died 1920)
- 1842 – Clarence King, American geologist, mountaineer, and critic (died 1901)
- 1856 – Giuseppe Martucci, Italian pianist, composer, and conductor (died 1909)
- 1857 – Hugh Mahon, Irish-Australian publisher and politician, 10th Australian Minister for Foreign Affairs (died 1931)
- 1857 – William Russell, American lawyer and politician, Governor of Massachusetts (died 1896)
- 1859 – Samuel Alexander, Australian-English philosopher and academic (died 1938)
- 1860 – Morton Selten, British actor (died 1939)
- 1861 – Victor Horta, Belgian architect, designed Hôtel van Eetvelde (died 1947)
- 1861 – George Lloyd, English-Canadian bishop and theologian (died 1940)
- 1870 – Gustav Bauer, German journalist and politician, 11th Chancellor of Germany (died 1944)
- 1872 – Alexander Scriabin, Russian pianist and composer (died 1915)
- 1874 – Fred Niblo, American actor, director, and producer (died 1948)
- 1878 – Adeline Genée, Danish-born British ballerina (died 1970)
- 1878 – Carl Sandburg, American poet and historian (died 1967)
- 1880 – Tom Mix, American cowboy and actor (died 1940)
- 1881 – Ion Minulescu, Romanian author, poet, and critic (died 1944)
- 1882 – Fan S. Noli, Albanian-American bishop and politician, 13th Prime Minister of Albania (died 1965)
- 1882 – Sam Rayburn, American lawyer and politician, 48th Speaker of the United States House of Representatives (died 1961)
- 1883 – Kahlil Gibran, Lebanese-American poet, painter, and philosopher (died 1931)
- 1889 – Dida Dederding, Danish doctor and academic (died 1955)
- 1891 – Ted McDonald, Australian cricketer (died 1937)
- 1898 – James Fitzmaurice, Irish soldier and pilot (died 1965)
- 1899 – Heinrich Nordhoff, German engineer (died 1968)
- 1900 – Maria of Yugoslavia, Queen of Yugoslavia (died 1961)

=== 1901–present ===
- 1903 – Maurice Abravanel, Greek-American pianist and conductor (died 1993)
- 1910 – Kid Chocolate, Cuban boxer (died 1988)
- 1910 – Wright Morris, American author and photographer (died 1998)
- 1912 – Jacques Ellul, French philosopher and critic (died 1994)
- 1912 – Danny Thomas, American actor, comedian, producer, and humanitarian (died 1991)
- 1913 – Edward Gierek, Polish lawyer and politician (died 2001)
- 1913 – Loretta Young, American actress (died 2000)
- 1914 – Godfrey Edward Arnold, Austrian-American physician and academic (died 1989)
- 1915 – Don Edwards, American soldier, lawyer, and politician (died 2015)
- 1915 – John C. Lilly, American psychoanalyst, physician, and philosopher (died 2001)
- 1915 – Alan Watts, English-American philosopher and author (died 1973)
- 1916 – Park Mok-wol, influential Korean poet and academic (died 1978)
- 1917 – Koo Chen-fu, Taiwanese businessman and diplomat (died 2005)
- 1920 – Henry Corden, Canadian-born American actor (died 2005)
- 1920 – John Maynard Smith, English biologist and geneticist (died 2004)
- 1920 – Sun Myung Moon, Korean religious leader; founder of the Unification Church (died 2012)
- 1920 – Early Wynn, American baseball player, coach, and sportscaster (died 1999)
- 1921 – Marianne Grunberg-Manago, Russian-French biochemist and academic (died 2013)
- 1921 – Cary Middlecoff, American golfer and sportscaster (died 1998)
- 1923 – Vladimir Kazantsev, Russian runner (died 2007)
- 1923 – Norman Kirk, New Zealand engineer and politician, 29th Prime Minister of New Zealand (died 1974)
- 1923 – Jacobo Timerman, Argentinian journalist and author (died 1999)
- 1924 – Kim Dae-jung, South Korean soldier and politician, 8th President of South Korea, Nobel Prize laureate (died 2009)
- 1924 – Earl Scruggs, American banjo player (died 2012)
- 1925 – John DeLorean, American engineer and businessman, founded the DeLorean Motor Company (died 2005)
- 1926 – Ralph Branca, American baseball player (died 2016)
- 1926 – Pat Flaherty, American race car driver (died 2002)
- 1926 – Mickey Hargitay, Hungarian-American actor and bodybuilder (died 2006)
- 1927 – Jesse Leonard Steinfeld, American physician and academic, 11th Surgeon General of the United States (died 2014)
- 1928 – Capucine, French actress and model (died 1990)
- 1930 – Vic Tayback, American actor (died 1990)
- 1931 – E. L. Doctorow, American novelist, playwright, and short story writer (died 2015)
- 1932 – Simon Oates, English actor (died 2009)
- 1932 – Stuart A. Rice, American chemist and academic (died 2024)
- 1933 – John Clive, English actor and author (died 2012)
- 1933 – Oleg Grigoryevich Makarov, Russian engineer and astronaut (died 2003)
- 1934 – Harry M. Miller, New Zealand-Australian talent agent and publicist (died 2018)
- 1934 – Sylvia Syms, English actress (died 2023)
- 1935 – Ian Meckiff, Australian cricketer
- 1935 – Nino Tempo, American musician, singer, and actor (died 2025)
- 1936 – Darlene Hard, American tennis player (died 2021)
- 1936 – Julio María Sanguinetti, Uruguayan journalist, lawyer, and politician, 29th President of Uruguay
- 1937 – Ludvík Daněk, Czech discus thrower (died 1998)
- 1937 – Lou Holtz, American football player, coach, and sportscaster (died 2026)
- 1937 – Doris Troy, American singer-songwriter (died 2004)
- 1938 – Adriano Celentano, Italian singer-songwriter, actor, and director
- 1938 – Adrienne Clarke, Australian botanist and academic
- 1938 – Rajnikumar Pandya, Indian writer, journalist (died 2025)
- 1938 – Larisa Shepitko, Soviet film director, screenwriter, and actress (died 1979)
- 1939 – Valeriy Lobanovskyi, Ukrainian footballer and manager (died 2002)
- 1939 – Murray Rose, English-Australian swimmer and sportscaster (died 2012)
- 1940 – Van McCoy, American singer-songwriter and producer (died 1979)
- 1943 – Terry Venables, English footballer and manager (died 2023)
- 1944 – Bonnie Franklin, American actress and singer (died 2013)
- 1944 – Alan Stivell, French singer-songwriter and harp player
- 1944 – Rolf M. Zinkernagel, Swiss immunologist and academic, Nobel Prize laureate
- 1945 – Barry John, Welsh rugby player (died 2024)
- 1945 – Jayanthi (actress), Indian film actress (died 2021)
- 1946 – Syd Barrett, English singer-songwriter and guitarist (died 2006)
- 1947 – Sandy Denny, English folk-rock singer-songwriter (died 1978)
- 1948 – Guy Gardner, American colonel and astronaut
- 1948 – Dayle Hadlee, New Zealand cricketer
- 1949 – Mike Boit, Kenyan runner and academic
- 1949 – Carolyn D. Wright, American poet and academic (died 2016)
- 1950 – Louis Freeh, American lawyer and jurist, 10th Director of the Federal Bureau of Investigation
- 1951 – Don Gullett, American baseball player and coach (died 2024)
- 1951 – Kim Wilson, American singer-songwriter and harmonica player
- 1953 – Malcolm Young, Scottish-Australian singer-songwriter, guitarist, and producer (died 2017)
- 1954 – Anthony Minghella, English director and screenwriter (died 2008)
- 1955 – Rowan Atkinson, English actor, producer, and screenwriter
- 1955 – Debbie Mathers, Mother of Eminem (died 2024)
- 1956 – Elizabeth Strout, American novelist and short story writer
- 1956 – Justin Welby, English archbishop
- 1956 – Clive Woodward, English rugby player and coach
- 1957 – Michael Foale, British-American astrophysicist and astronaut
- 1957 – Nancy Lopez, American golfer and sportscaster
- 1958 – Shlomo Glickstein, Israeli tennis player
- 1959 – Kapil Dev, Indian cricketer
- 1960 – Paul Azinger, American golfer and sportscaster
- 1960 – Kari Jalonen, Finnish ice hockey player and coach
- 1960 – Nigella Lawson, English chef and author
- 1960 – Howie Long, American football player and sports commentator
- 1961 – Georges Jobé, Belgian motocross racer (died 2012)
- 1961 – Nigel Melville, English rugby player
- 1961 – Peter Whittle, British politician, author, journalist, and broadcaster (died 2025)
- 1963 – Norm Charlton, American baseball player and coach
- 1963 – Paul Kipkoech, Kenyan runner (died 1995)
- 1964 – Charles Haley, American football player
- 1964 – Jyrki Kasvi, Finnish journalist and politician (died 2021)
- 1964 – Jacqueline Moore, American wrestler and manager
- 1965 – Bjørn Lomborg, Danish author and academic
- 1966 – Sharon Cuneta, Filipino singer and actress
- 1966 – Attilio Lombardo, Italian footballer and manager
- 1967 – A. R. Rahman, Indian composer, singer-songwriter, music producer, musician, and philanthropist
- 1968 – John Singleton, American director, producer, and screenwriter (died 2019)
- 1969 – Norman Reedus, American actor and model
- 1969 – Aron Eisenberg, American actor and podcaster (died 2019)
- 1970 – Leonardo Astrada, Argentine footballer and manager
- 1970 – Julie Chen Moonves, American television personality, presenter, and producer
- 1970 – Radoslav Látal, Czech footballer and manager
- 1970 – Gabrielle Reece, American volleyball player, sportscaster, and actress
- 1971 – Irwin Thomas, American-Australian singer-songwriter and guitarist
- 1973 – Vasso Karantasiou, Greek beach volleyball player
- 1974 – Marlon Anderson, American baseball player and sportscaster
- 1974 – Daniel Cordone, Argentinian footballer
- 1974 – Paul Grant, American basketball player and coach
- 1975 – James Farrior, American football player
- 1976 – Johan Davidsson, Swedish ice hockey player
- 1976 – Danny Pintauro, American actor
- 1976 – Richard Zedník, Slovak ice hockey player
- 1978 – Casey Fossum, American baseball player
- 1978 – Bubba Franks, American football player
- 1978 – Agnieszka Stelmaszyk, Polish writer
- 1981 – Rinko Kikuchi, Japanese actress
- 1981 – Asante Samuel, American football player
- 1982 – Gilbert Arenas, American basketball player
- 1982 – Roy Asotasi, New Zealand rugby league player
- 1982 – Tiffany Pollard, American television personality
- 1982 – Israel Damonte, Argentine footballer and manager
- 1982 – Eddie Redmayne, English actor and model
- 1983 – Adam Burish, American ice hockey player
- 1983 – Chen Nan, Chinese basketball player
- 1984 – A. J. Hawk, American football player and analyst
- 1984 – Kate McKinnon, American actress and comedian
- 1984 – Eric Trump, American businessman
- 1986 – Paul McShane, Irish footballer
- 1986 – Petter Northug, Norwegian skier
- 1986 – Irina Shayk, Russian fashion model
- 1986 – Alex Turner, English singer, songwriter, and musician
- 1987 – Arin Hanson, American YouTuber
- 1987 – Bongani Khumalo, South African footballer
- 1987 – Ndamukong Suh, American football player
- 1989 – Andy Carroll, English footballer
- 1989 – Sergio León, Spanish footballer
- 1989 – Derrick Morgan, American football player
- 1990 – Cristian Erbes, Argentine footballer
- 1990 – Sean Kilpatrick, American basketball player
- 1990 – Alex Teixeira, Brazilian footballer
- 1991 – Duarte Alves, Portuguese politician
- 1991 – Will Barton, American basketball player
- 1991 – Kevin Gausman, American baseball player
- 1992 – Corey Conners, Canadian professional golfer
- 1993 – Pat Connaughton, American basketball player
- 1993 – Jesús Manuel Corona, Mexican footballer
- 1993 – Jérôme Roussillon, French-Guadeloupean footballer
- 1994 – Catriona Gray, Filipino-Australian model, singer and beauty queen, Miss Universe 2018
- 1994 – Denis Suárez, Spanish footballer
- 1994 – Jameis Winston, American football player
- 1994 – Jay B, South Korean singer
- 1996 – Courtney Eaton, Australian model and actress
- 1997 – Michel Aebischer, Swiss footballer
- 1999 – Polo G, American rapper
- 1999 – Mac McClung, American basketball player
- 2000 – Fiete Arp, German footballer
- 2000 – Mohamed Camara, Malian footballer
- 2000 – Kwon Eun-bin, South Korean singer and actress
- 2000 – Jack McBain, Canadian ice hockey player
- 2000 – Shuhua, Taiwanese singer
- 2000 – Tyler Oliveira, American YouTuber
- 2003 – MattyBRaps, American rapper, singer, and YouTuber
- 2006 – Stefanos Tzimas, Greek footballer

== Deaths ==
=== Pre-1600 ===
- 786 – Abo of Tiflis, Iraqi martyr and saint (born 756)
- 1088 – Berengar of Tours, French scholar and theologian (born 999)
- 1148 – Gilbert de Clare, 1st Earl of Pembroke (born 1100)
- 1233 – Matilda of Chester, Countess of Huntingdon, Anglo-Norman noblewoman (born 1171)
- 1275 – Raymond of Penyafort, Catalan archbishop and saint (born 1175)
- 1358 – Gertrude van der Oosten, Beguine mystic
- 1406 – Roger Walden, English bishop
- 1448 – Christopher of Bavaria, King of Denmark, Norway and Sweden (born 1418)
- 1478 – Uzun Hasan, Shahanshah of the Turkoman Aq Qoyunlu dynasty (born 1423)
- 1537 – Alessandro de' Medici, Duke of Florence (born 1510)
- 1537 – Baldassare Peruzzi, Italian architect and painter, designed the Palazzo Massimo alle Colonne (born 1481)

=== 1601–1900 ===
- 1616 – Philip Henslowe, English impresario (born 1550)
- 1689 – Seth Ward, English bishop, mathematician, and astronomer (born 1617)
- 1693 – Mehmed IV, Ottoman sultan (born 1642)
- 1725 – Chikamatsu Monzaemon, Japanese actor and playwright (born 1653)
- 1731 – Étienne François Geoffroy, French physician and chemist (born 1672)
- 1734 – John Dennis, English playwright and critic (born 1657)
- 1829 – Josef Dobrovský, Czech philologist and historian (born 1753)
- 1831 – Rodolphe Kreutzer, French violinist, composer, and conductor (born 1766)
- 1840 – Frances Burney, English author and playwright (born 1752)
- 1852 – Louis Braille, French educator, invented Braille (born 1809)
- 1855 – Giacomo Beltrami, Italian jurist, explorer, and author (born 1779)
- 1882 – Richard Henry Dana Jr., American lawyer and politician (born 1815)
- 1884 – Gregor Mendel, Czech geneticist and botanist (born 1822)
- 1885 – Bharatendu Harishchandra, Indian author, poet, and playwright (born 1850)

=== 1901–present ===
- 1902 – Lars Hertervig, Norwegian painter (born 1830)
- 1917 – Hendrick Peter Godfried Quack, Dutch economist and historian (born 1834)
- 1918 – Georg Cantor, German mathematician and philosopher (born 1845)
- 1919 – Theodore Roosevelt, American colonel and politician, 26th President of the United States (born 1858)
- 1921 – Devil Anse Hatfield, American Confederate guerrilla and leader of the Hatfield clan during the Hatfield-McCoy feud (born 1839)
- 1922 – Jakob Rosanes, German mathematician and chess player (born 1842)
- 1928 – Alvin Kraenzlein, American hurdler and long jumper (born 1876)
- 1928 – Wilhelm Ramsay, Finnish geologist and professor (born 1865)
- 1933 – Vladimir de Pachmann, Russian pianist (born 1848)
- 1934 – Herbert Chapman, English footballer and manager (born 1878)
- 1937 – André Bessette, Canadian saint (born 1845)
- 1938 – Protógenes Guimarães, Brazilian admiral and politician (born 1876)
- 1941 – Charley O'Leary, American baseball player and coach (born 1875)
- 1942 – Emma Calvé, French soprano and actress (born 1858)
- 1942 – Henri de Baillet-Latour, Belgian aristocrat, 3rd President of the International Olympic Committee (born 1876)
- 1944 – Ida Tarbell, American journalist, reformer, and educator (born 1857)
- 1945 – Vladimir Vernadsky, Russian mineralogist and chemist (born 1863)
- 1949 – Victor Fleming, American director, producer, and cinematographer (born 1883)
- 1966 – Jean Lurçat, French painter (born 1892)
- 1972 – Chen Yi, Chinese general and politician, Foreign Minister of the People's Republic of China (born 1901)
- 1974 – David Alfaro Siqueiros, Mexican painter (born 1896)
- 1978 – Burt Munro, New Zealand motorcycle racer (born 1899)
- 1981 – A. J. Cronin, Scottish physician and author (born 1896)
- 1984 – Ernest Laszlo, Hungarian-American cinematographer (born 1898)
- 1990 – Ian Charleson, Scottish-English actor (born 1949)
- 1990 – Pavel Cherenkov, Russian physicist and academic, Nobel Prize laureate (born 1904)
- 1991 – Alan Wiggins, American baseball player (born 1958)
- 1992 – Steve Gilpin, New Zealand vocalist and songwriter (born 1949)
- 1993 – Dizzy Gillespie, American singer-songwriter and trumpet player (born 1917)
- 1993 – Rudolf Nureyev, Russian-French dancer and choreographer (born 1938)
- 1995 – Joe Slovo, Lithuanian-South African lawyer and politician (born 1926)
- 1999 – Michel Petrucciani, French-American pianist (born 1962)
- 2004 – Pierre Charles, Dominican educator and politician, 5th Prime Minister of Dominica (born 1954)
- 2005 – Eileen Desmond, Irish civil servant and politician, 12th Irish Minister for Health (born 1932)
- 2005 – Lois Hole, Canadian academic and politician, 15th Lieutenant Governor of Alberta (born 1929)
- 2005 – Tarquinio Provini, Italian motorcycle racer (born 1933)
- 2006 – Lou Rawls, American singer-songwriter (born 1933)
- 2007 – Roberta Wohlstetter, American political scientist, historian, and academic (born 1912)
- 2008 – Shmuel Berenbaum, Rabbi of Mir Yeshiva (Brooklyn) (born 1920)
- 2011 – Uche Okafor, Nigerian footballer, coach, and sportscaster (born 1967)
- 2012 – Bob Holness, South African-English radio and television host (born 1928)
- 2013 – Ruth Carter Stevenson, American art collector, founded the Amon Carter Museum of American Art (born 1923)
- 2014 – Marina Ginestà, French Resistance soldier and photographer (born 1919)
- 2014 – Nelson Ned, Brazilian singer-songwriter (born 1947)
- 2014 – Julian Rotter, American psychologist and academic (born 1916)
- 2015 – Basil John Mason, English meteorologist and academic (born 1923)
- 2016 – Pat Harrington, Jr., American actor and screenwriter (born 1929)
- 2016 – Florence King, American journalist and author (born 1936)
- 2016 – Christy O'Connor Jnr, Irish golfer and architect (born 1948)
- 2016 – Silvana Pampanini, Italian model, actress, and director, Miss Italy 1946 (born 1925)
- 2017 – Octavio Lepage, Venezuelan politician, President of Venezuela (born 1923)
- 2017 – Om Puri, Indian actor (born 1950)
- 2019 – José Ramón Fernández, Cuban revolution leader (born 1923)
- 2019 – Lamin Sanneh, Gambian-born American professor (born 1942)
- 2019 – W. Morgan Sheppard, British actor (born 1932)
- 2019 – Paul Streeten, Austrian-born British economics professor (born 1917)
- 2020 – Richard Maponya, South African businessman (born 1920)
- 2021 – Ashli Babbitt, American participant in the January 6 United States Capitol attack
- 2021 – Gordon Renwick, Canadian ice hockey administrator and businessman (born 1935)
- 2021 – James Cross, British diplomat kidnapped during the 1970 October crisis in Québec (born 1921)
- 2022 – Peter Bogdanovich, American actor, director, producer, and screenwriter (born 1939)
- 2022 – Sidney Poitier, Bahamian-American actor, director, and diplomat (born 1927)
- 2022 – Francisco Sionil Jose, Philippine novelist (born 1924)
- 2023 – Mary Lou Kownacki, American Roman Catholic nun, peace activist, and writer (born 1941)

== Holidays and observances ==
- Christian Feast day:
  - André Bessette (Roman Catholic Church)
  - January 6 (Eastern Orthodox liturgics)
- Christmas:
  - Christmas (Armenian Apostolic Church)
  - Christmas Eve (Russia)
  - Christmas Eve (Ukraine)
- Epiphany or Three Kings' Day (Western Christianity) or Theophany (Eastern Christianity), and its related observances:
  - Little Christmas (Ireland)
  - Þrettándinn (Iceland)
