= Iraqi Communist Party (1960) =

Political party

The Iraqi Communist Party of Daud as-Sayegh was a short-lived political party in Iraq, which existed parallel to the main (and illegal) Iraqi Communist Party. It emerged in 1960, after the enactment of the Associations Law. Daud as-Sayegh was the chairman of the party. The party published the daily newspaper al-Mabda'.

As-Sayegh, who had been expelled from the Iraqi Communist Party in 1958, was able to register his party with the name 'Iraqi Communist Party' on February 9, 1960 (having presented their application on January 9, 1960). Simultaneously, the main Iraqi Communist Party was denied registration. As-Sayegh's party had only been able to attract a tiny fraction of the following of the main Iraqi Communist Party. The party was condemned by the main Iraqi Communist Party and in the international communist press (such as Pravda and World Marxist Review). At the time, reports circulated that as-Sayegh's party was financially supported by the Qasim government. Moreover, as-Sayegh was accused of having forged, or at least misused, signatories for the registration of his party.

As-Sayegh made a public appeal to all communists to join his party. The main Iraqi Communist Party, having been denied legal recognition, did engage in talks with as-Sayegh's party. Considering the wide differences in strength, the main Iraqi Communist Party foresaw that it would be able to seize control over as-Sayegh's party. During the spring of 1960, Baha ud-Din Nuri managed the negotiations on behalf of the mainstream communists. However, as-Sayegh set as a precondition for a merger the expulsion of Salam Adil, Jamal al-Haidari and Amir Abdullah. The mainstream communists refused to accept this demand. In June 1960 negotiations reopened, and by this point the mainstream communists had de facto accepted as-Sayegh's demand (by forcing the three leaders to step down from their positions for 'health reasons'). However, the merger talks were spoiled as-Sayegh noticed that Baha ud-Din Nuri was conspiring with Abd as-Samad Hamid (a Central Committee member of as-Sayegh's party) to seize control of his party.

On November 9–11, 1960, as-Sayegh's party held its party convention (it should have been held by May 1960 at the latest according to the Associations Law, but the party was received a special dispense from the Minister of Interior to postpone the convention). According to a report in al-Mabda', there were 160 delegates present. A Central Committee with 17 members was elected, including as-Sayegh, Ibrahim Abd al-Hussein, Abd al-Jabbar Ghafuri, Abd as-Samad Hamid.

In October 1961, the authorities closed down the Kut branch of the party, claiming that it had become inactive.

On December 2, 1961, the party held its second convention. 120 delegates took part in the deliberations. A new Executive Committee was elected, with as-Sayegh as chairman. Other members of the committee were Sa'ad Muhsin, Ali Hadi, Abd al-Jabbar Majid, Ibrahim Abd al-Hussain, Ghadban Hamzah, Muhammad Jawad Ta'mah, Abd al-Karim al-Asadi, Umar Sufi, Karim Nasif, Zuhayr at-Ta'i, Turki Abd al-Jafur, Falih Hasan, Khalil as-Salihi, Jasim Isma'il, Anwar Taha and Abd al-Jabbar Hasan
