= Al-Qaidah (newspaper) =

Former Iraq newspaper

- Founded: January 1943
- Ceased publication: June 19, 1956
- Political alignment: Communist
- Language: Arabic
- Circulation: ~5,400 (as of 1954–55)

Al-Qaidah (Arabic: القاعدة, The Base) was an Arabic-language newspaper published in Iraq. It was an organ of the Iraqi Communist Party. It was printed clandestinely for thirteen years, albeit with interruptions.

The first issue of al-Qaidah came out in January 1943. Al-Qaidah was founded in the midst of a split in the party. It was set up by Daud as-Sayegh, Hussain Muhammad ash-Shabibi and Zaki Muhammad Basim, who were supporters of Yusuf Salman Yusuf (a.k.a. Comrade Fahd) in the party's Central Committee. The newspaper sought to compete with ash-Shararah ('The Spark') for the position as the party organ. The different factions were effectively known by the names of their publications. As-Sayegh served as editor of al-Qaidah before being expelled from the party.

Al-Qaidah was banned by the government, and being caught with an issue of the newspaper could result in a prison sentence. By 1947 al-Qaidah had a circulation of around 3,000. It was probably one of the most widely read newspapers in the country at the time. It was primarily read in Baghdad, the Shiite south and the Kurdish north. During 1954–55, seventeen issues of al-Qaidah were published. In spite of being an illegal underground publication, its issues had an average circulation of around 5,400.

In 1955 a workers newspaper, Ittihad ul-Amal was founded, after which al-Qaidah began focusing more on agrarian issues.

Al-Qaidah was shut down as the party reconciled with the Rayat ash-Shaghilah ('Toilers Banner') group, and Ittihad ash-Sha'ab ('People's Union') was founded as the new party organ. The last issue was published on June 19, 1956.
