= Richard Luchsinger =

Richard Luchsinger (1900–1993) was a Swiss medical doctor who made early contributions to the field of Speech Language Pathology, specifically in "phoniatry" or the study of voice. He was born in Switzerland and specialized in otorhinolaryngology. His most notable contribution to the field of voice was a textbook that he published with Dr. Gottfried E. Arnold. The textbook was originally published in German, however the second edition, published in 1965, was translated into English under the title: Voice-Speech-Language.

Although the text was written over 40 years ago, the topics covered in the text are quite similar to those that would be covered in a contemporary voice textbook, which shows how much further along the study of phoniatry was compared to other subdivisions of Speech Language Pathology at the time. For example, topics covered in this text included: speech acoustics, observational methods, treatment of laryngeal electromyography, physiology of respiration and voice production, genetic factors in voice, development of voice throughout the lifespan, professional voice, voice therapy; pathology of the larynx, nodules, asymmetries, genetic defects of voice and laryngeal web, sulcus glottides, voice related endocrine problems, the effects of peripheral nerve lesions, the sympathetic nervous system; laryngeal myopathy, central lesions of the nervous system, laryngeal trauma, cordectomy, joint disorders, alaryngeal voice, vasomotor effects on vocal fold function, functional dysphonias, contact ulcers, ventricular voice, and psychogenic voice disorders.

Luchsinger founded one of the first scholarly journals devoted to the study of voice, called the Folia Phoniatrica. He also founded the Swiss Society for Phoniatrics, Logopedics, and Audiology. Luchsinger published more than 120 research articles, ranging in topic from Cri Du Chat Syndrome to laryngeal surgery. He continued to be an active participant in the Speech Language Pathology community until his death in 1993.
