= Godfrey Edward Arnold =

Godfrey Edward Arnold, born as Gottfried Eduard Arnold (Olmütz/then Austria-Hungary, January 6, 1914 – Vienna, July 5, 1989), was an Austrian American professor of medicine and researcher. His studies centered on speech, speech disorder and clinical communicology.

== Early life ==
Arnold was a son of Anton Arnold, tenor at the Vienna Court Opera, and attended the Theresian Academy in Vienna. He completed his studies (as a medical doctor) at the University of Vienna and (as pianist) at the State Academy of Music and Performing Arts. Several internships with Hermann Gutzmann jun. (1892–1972) in Berlin deepened his phoniatric knowledge. His case studies at the Voice and Speech Ambulance of the Vienna Ear Clinic at the Vienna General Hospital led to a fundamental publication describing traumatic and constitutional disorders of voice and speech (Die traumatischen und konstitutionellen Störungen der Stimme und Sprache, Vienna 1948). He coauthored the fundamental textbook on voice and speech medicine (Lehrbuch der Stimm- und Sprachheilkunde, first edition Vienna, 1949) together with the Swiss phoniatre Richard Luchsinger (1900–1993).

== Career in the United States ==
In 1949 he immigrated into the US and lived until 1963 in New York City, where he worked inter alia at the National Hospital for Speech Disorders and as head of research at the Otolaryngology Department of the New York Eye and Ear Infirmary.

In 1962, Arnold developed the method to inject teflon into the vocal cords und coined the term "phonosurgery" with Hans von Leden the following year.

Arnold was founding director of the Division of Otolaryngology in the University of Mississippi Medical Center, Jackson, 1963–79. His work included research on cancer.

He is coauthor (with Richard Luchsinger) of the textbook "Voice - Speech - Language". A previous version of this work had been published in German in 1949. Although the text was now written several decades ago, the topics covered are quite similar to those in a contemporary voice textbook, which shows how advanced the study of phoniatry was compared to other subdivisions of Speech Language Pathology at the time. For example, topics covered in this text include: speech acoustics, observational methods, treatment of laryngeal electromyography, physiology of respiration and voice production, genetic factors in voice, development of voice throughout the lifespan, professional voice, voice therapy; pathology of the larynx, nodules, asymmetries, genetic defects of voice and laryngeal web, sulcus glottides, voice related endocrine problems, the effects of peripheral nerve lesions, the sympathetic nervous system; laryngeal myopathy, central lesions of the nervous system, laryngeal trauma, cordectomy, joint disorders, alaryngeal voice, vasomotor effects on vocal fold function, functional dysphonias, contact ulcers, ventricular voice, and psychogenic voice disorders.

Arnold also wrote the pertinent (and still current) articles on speech and speech disorder in the Encyclopædia Britannica.

== Personal life ==
Arnold married Isolde Reuter in 1941 and had a daughter, Claudia. After his retirement, he moved to Vienna, where he died in 1989. He is buried on the Zentralfriedhof (33A-1-20). His wife, an opera singer and actress, died November 4, 2016, in Grinzing, a suburb of Vienna.

== Honors ==
In 1982, Arnold received the Honors of the American Speech-Language-Hearing Association (ASHA).

In 1988 he was bestowed the Medal of Honor of the Federal Capital of Vienna in gold.
