= Jamal al-Haidari =

Iraqi communist politician

Jamal al-Haidari (Arabic: جمال الحيدري; died 1963) was an Iraqi communist politician. He joined the Iraqi Communist Party in 1946, and became the leader of a rebel communist faction during the 1950s. After rejoining the Communist Party in 1956 he became a prominent leader but was entangled in the internal disputes of the party. In 1963 he was executed by the new Baathist regime.

== Joining the Communist Party ==
In 1946 al-Haidari, along with his brother Salah al-Haidari, was amongst the militants of the Kurdish communist group Shursh that joined the Iraqi Communist Party rather than merging into the Kurdish Democratic Party.

== Rayat ash-Shaghilah period ==
In 1952, whilst in prison, al-Haidari rebelled against the adoption of a new party programme of the Communist Party. Al-Haidari, along with other critics of the new party leadership, were expelled from the party. In February 1953, after the Communist Party organ al-Qaidah had published a ferocious attack on the expelled dissidents, al-Haidari's group decided to form a new organization, named after its organ Rayat ash-Shaghilah ('Toilers Banner'). Al-Haidari became the main spokesperson of the Rayat ash-Shaghilah group. Al-Haidari dedicated his energy into combating the Communist Party and its leader, Basim, in particular. Amongst other things, al-Haidari tried unsuccessfully to convince the Communist Party of the Soviet Union to recognize his group over the Iraqi Communist Party.

== Communist Party Politburo ==
In 1956, after shifts in the leadership in the Iraqi Communist Party, al-Haidari's group reunified with the party. Following the merger, Al-Haidari became a politburo member of the Communist Party. Al-Haidari became a close associate of the new general secretary Salam Adil, and together Adil and al-Haidari constituted one of the two politburo fractions (the other, nicknamed the 'Clique of Foor' was led by Baha ud-Din Nuri). Towards the late 1950s, the situation in the politburo deteriorated. The 'Clique of Foor' accused Adil and al-Haidari of spoiling the relations with Abd al-Karim Qasim.

== Forced into exile ==
In 1960, al-Haidari was forced into exile. At the time the Communist Party was seeking legal recognition, but the state authorities had instead decided to register a bogus 'Iraqi Communist Party' headed by Daud as-Sayegh. As-Sayegh had demanded that Adil, al-Haidari and Amir Abdullah be expelled from the Iraqi Communist Party as a condition for a merger with his party (which would have given the Communist Party legal status). In the end a settlement was reached (with as-Sayegh unofficially bargaining on behalf of the then government), al-Haidari and Abdullah were relieved of their party duties due to 'health reasons' and exit visas were provided (through as-Sayegh's government contacts) for them to travel to Moscow. In Moscow they joined Adil, who had already been sent there for medical treatment. Still, the merger between the Communist Party and as-Sayegh's party failed to go through for other reasons.

== Back in Iraq, Baathist coup ==
In September 1962 Adil and al-Haidari returned to Iraq. Adil again took charge of the party, and formed a new Secretariat with al-Haidari as the head of the Peasants Bureau of the party.

With the February 8, 1963, Baathist coup d'état, a crackdown was launched against the Communist Party. Al-Haidari was able to escape arrest and went underground. Along with Abd ul-Jabbar Wahbi and Salih al-Abli, al-Haidari established a new 'Central Party Leadership'. On July 20, 1963, al-Haidari was captured and executed.
