= Silica granuloma =

- Specialty: Dermatology

Silica granulomas are a skin condition which may be caused by automobile and other types of accidents which produces tattooing of dirt (silicon dioxide) into the skin that then induces the granuloma formation.

== See also ==
- Granuloma
- Skin lesion
