= Rayat ash-Shaghilah =

Rayat ash-Shaghilah راية الشغّيلة
- Founder: Jamal al-Haidari; Aziz Muhammad; Abd us-Salam al-Nasiri; Zaki Khairi
- Founded: 1952
- Dissolved: June 1956
- Split from: Iraqi Communist Party
- Merged into: Iraqi Communist Party
- Ideology: Communism

Rayat ash-Shaghilah (Arabic: راية الشغّيلة, 'Banner of the Toilers') was a communist organization in Iraq, named after its publication with the same name. Rayat ash-Shaghilah was founded in 1953 by a group that had been expelled from the Iraqi Communist Party. Its main spokesperson was Jamal al-Haidari. Rayat ash-Shaghilah was the largest communist splinter-group in Iraq at the time.

== Split in the Iraqi Communist Party ==
In 1952 the Iraqi Communist Party had adopted a new party programme, which was more radical in its call for action than the programme in use during Fahd's leadership. The new party programme called for nationalization of oil industry, eradication of British interests and the formation of a unified popular front under communist leadership. The core of the Rayat ash-Shaghilah consisted of al-Haidari, Aziz Muhammad, Abd us-Salam al-Nasiri and Zaki Khairi, who had criticized the positions of the new party programme whilst in prison and had subsequently been expelled from the party by the party leader Basim. Several other Communist Party members, who were seen as supportive of the dissidents, were also expelled. Amongst them was Abd ur-Razzak as-Safi. In February 1953 the Communist Party main organ, al-Qaidah, denounced the dissidents as 'opportunists and subversives'. Moreover, al-Qaidah made the names of the dissidents public, thus revealing their identities to the police. In response, the dissidents launched the eponymous publication. The Iraqi Communist Party would continue to attack Rayat ash-Shaghilah group throughout 1953–1954 and names of Rayat ash-Shaghilah members continued to be publicized in al-Qaidah. Rejecting the dissidents, al-Qaidah branded the group as 'royalists, deviationists and destructive' and collaborators of the security police.

== International profile ==
Internationally, the group proclaimed its loyalty to the Soviet Union. The group sought recognition from the World Communist Movement as the legitimate representative of the Iraqi communist movement, thus challenging the international position of the Iraqi Communist Party. Rayat ash-Shaghilah sent its own delegation to the 5th World Festival of Youth and Students held in Warsaw, Poland, in 1955. The Communist Party of the Soviet Union did however not recognize the group and continued to identify it as a splinter-group.

== Merger with the Iraqi Communist Party ==
In mid-1955 Salam Adil became the new general secretary of the Iraqi Communist Party. Rapidly, he undertook moves towards unity with various dissident groups. On July 22, 1955, Adil presented a proposal to Rayat ash-Shaghilah for unification into the Communist Party. The proposal consisted of four points. Rayat ash-Shaghilah responded that they were positive in principle. However, they continued to publish political assaults on al-Qaidah.

In March 1956, the Iraqi Communist Party issued a public appeal to all splinter-groups to return to the party. The appeal specifically mentioned Rayat ash-Shaghilah, stating that reasons for their departure from the party had ceased to be relevant after the 20th Congress of the Communist Party of the Soviet Union. In April 1956 another faction, the Unity of Communists of Iraq, merged with the Communist Party. That merger speedied up the merger talks between the Communist Party and Rayat ash-Shaghilah. The unification between the two groups finally took place in June 1956, after a series of negotiations facilitated by the Syrian communist leader Khalid Bakdash. The last issue of Rayat ash-Shaghilah was published in mid-June 1956, in which the group expressed self-criticism over having acting divisively in the communist movement. The Communist Party on its behalf also regretted its actions during the split, claiming that the 1952 expulsions had been 'childish and bureaucratic'.
