= Ittihad ash-Sha'ab =

Ittihad ash-Sha'ab (Arabic: اتحاد الشعب, 'Unity of the People') was an Arabic-language daily newspaper published from Baghdad, Iraq. It was the main organ of the Iraqi Communist Party. Abd al-Qadir Isma'il al-Bustani was the editor-in-chief of the paper which had a circulation of 15,000.

The newspaper began circulating secretly sometime in 1956. After the minor splinter group of Daud as-Sayegh had been accorded the legal recognition of the name 'Iraqi Communist Party' in early 1960, the mainstream (and un-recognized) Iraqi Communist Party became informally known as the 'Ittihad ash-Sha'ab Party'. On 15 February 1960, the party sought legal recognition under the Associations Law under the name 'People's Unity Party' (i.e. Ittihad ash-Sha'ab Party), but this application was rejected by the Ministry of Interior.

During 1960, Ittihad ash-Sha'ab and other publications of the mainstream Communist Party were targeted by the Abd al-Karim Qasim government. In March 1960 Brigadier Sayyid Hamid Sayyid Hussein issued an order prohibiting the circulation of Ittihad ash-Sha'ab in seven districts of southern Iraq. From June 1960, distribution of Ittihad ash-Sha'ab was restricted in half of Iraq (including major cities) through security restrictions and harassment by police forces. On 30 September 1960 the newspaper was closed down for a period of ten months. Next month it was banned by the government. Abd al-Qadir Isma'il al-Bustani was sentenced to three months imprisonment (Qasim, however, ordered his release the day after the sentence had been issued). Abd al-Jabbar Wahbi, another member of the Ittihad ash-Sha'ab editorial board, was placed under house arrest in Ramadi.
