= Laura Hilgermann =

Austrian singer

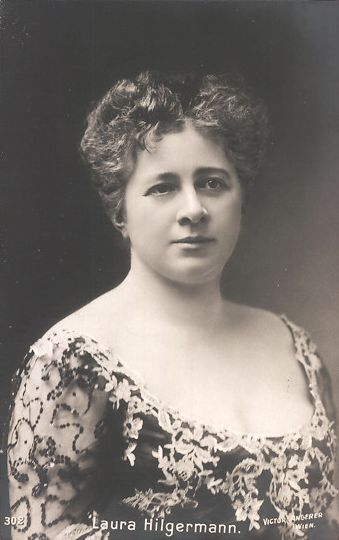
Laura Hilgermann

Laura Hilgermann (born Laura Oberländer, married Laura Rosenberg or Laura Hilgermann-Radó; 13 October 1869 in Vienna, (Austria-Hungary) – 9 February 1945 in Budapest, Hungarian Empire) was an Austro-Hungarian operatic singer (soprano and contralto) then singing teacher.

== Students ==
- Gitta Alpár
- Anton Arnold
- Charlotte Eisler
- Maria von Ilosvay
- Maria Nemeth
- Enid Szánthó

== Sources ==
- Ludwig Eisenberg: Großes biographisches Lexikon der Deutschen Bühne im XIX. Jahrhundert. Edited by Paul Liszt, Leipzig 1903, p. 434, (Laura Hilgermann is available for free viewing and download at the Internet Archive).
- C. Höslinger: "Radó-Hilgermann, Laura; geb. Oberländer, verehel. Radó, früher Hilgermann". In: Österreichisches Biographisches Lexikon 1815–1950 (ÖBL). Vol. 8, Austrian Academy of Sciences, Vienna 1983, ISBN 3-7001-0187-2, p. 380 f. (Direct links to "p. 380", "p. 381")
- Felix Czeike (publisher): Hilgermann, Laura. In Oesterreichisches Musiklexikon. Volume 3, Kremayr & Scheriau, Vienna 1994, ISBN 3-218-00545-0, p. 187
- Laura Hilgermann on OeML
