= Maria von Ilosvay =

Mária von Ilosvay (8 May 1913 – 16 June 1987) was a Hungarian contralto renowned for her performances of the role of Erda in Richard Wagner's Der Ring des Nibelungen.

She studied in Budapest and Vienna, where her teachers included Laura Hilgermann, Felicie Kashovska and Mária Budanovits. In 1937 she won first prize in the International Singing Contest in Vienna. During 1937 and 1938 she toured America with an opera company. In 1940, she joined the Hamburg company, while appearing as a guest artist in Vienna, Brussels, Amsterdam, and Salzburg. She became a mainstay at the Bayreuth Festival following its re-opening in 1951 when she made her debut there, until 1958. She recorded the role of Erda in live recordings from Bayreuth conducted by Clemens Krauss (1953) and Joseph Keilberth (1955, Decca stereo).

Among her other recordings of opera excerpts on two 10-inch LPs are arias from La finta semplice, La Betulia Liberata, Il trovatore, Don Carlos, Mignon and Carmen. She may also be heard in Verdi's Requiem, recorded in 1955 under Paul van Kempen.
