= League of Iraqi Communists =

League of Iraqi Communists (Arabic: رابطة الشيوعيين العراقيين) was a communist organisation in Iraq, led by Daud as-Sayegh. The League was founded in February 1944, after a split in the Iraqi Communist Party. As-Sayegh had revolted against Fahd's leadership in the Iraqi Communist Party, accusing him of adventurism and undemocratic practices. The League published the publication al-'Amal.
