= Intubation granuloma =

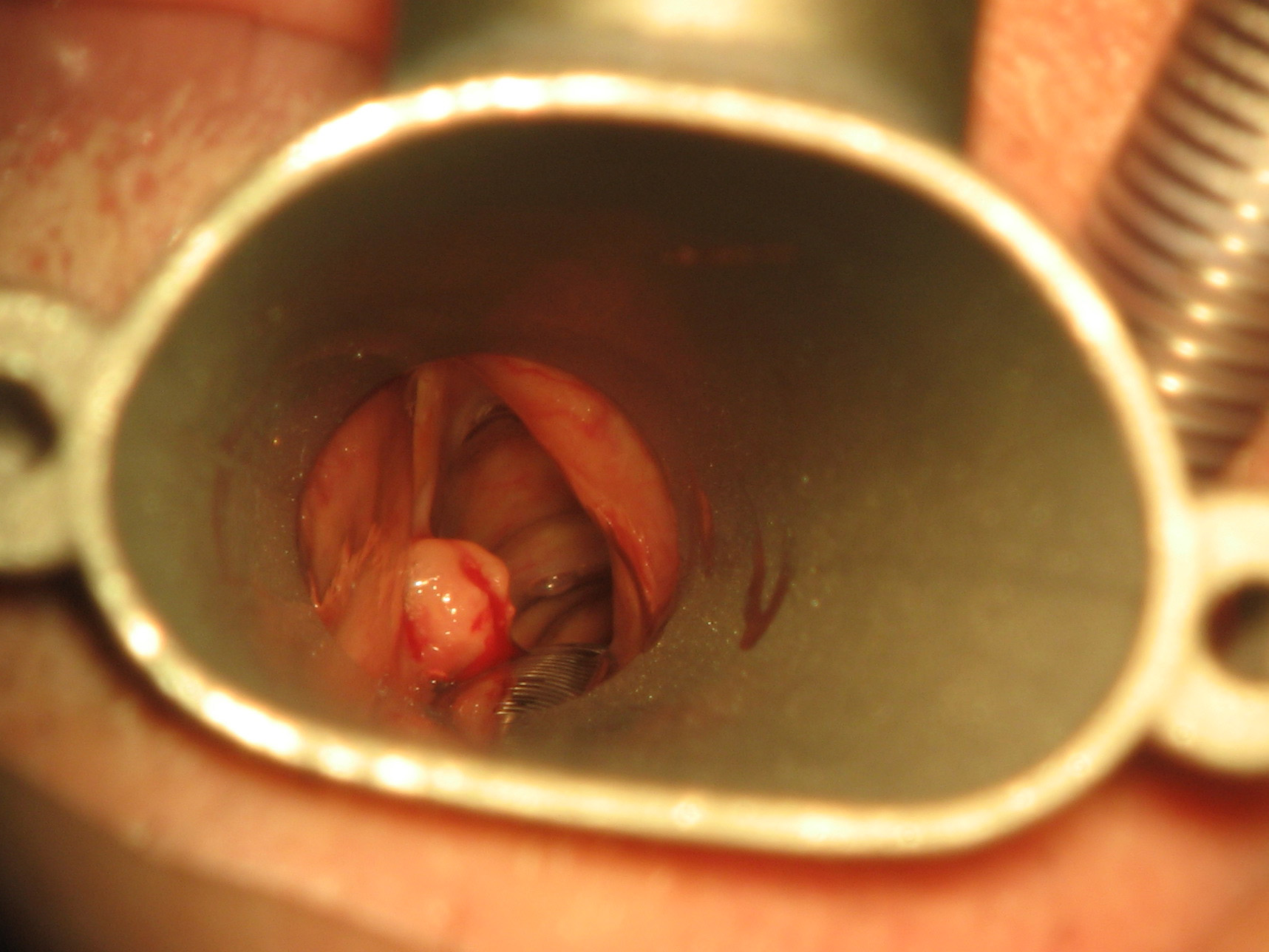
- Laryngoscopic view of the vocal process. An intubation granuloma is visible as a pale nodule on the left posterior laryngeal wall.

Intubation granuloma is a benign growth of granulation tissue in the larynx or trachea, which arises from tissue trauma due to endotracheal intubation. This medical condition is described as a common late complication of tracheal intubation, specifically caused by irritation to the mucosal tissue of the airway during insertion or removal of the patient's intubation tube.

Endotracheal intubation is a common medical procedure, performed to assist patient ventilation and protect the airway. However, prolonged endotracheal intubation, the use of inappropriate intubation equipment, or improper airway manipulation by the medical team may directly lead to mechanical trauma, resulting in laryngeal granuloma formation in the subglottis of the larynx. Diagnosis of intubation granulomas are achieved through identifying proliferating tissues in the vocal folds via laryngoscopy.

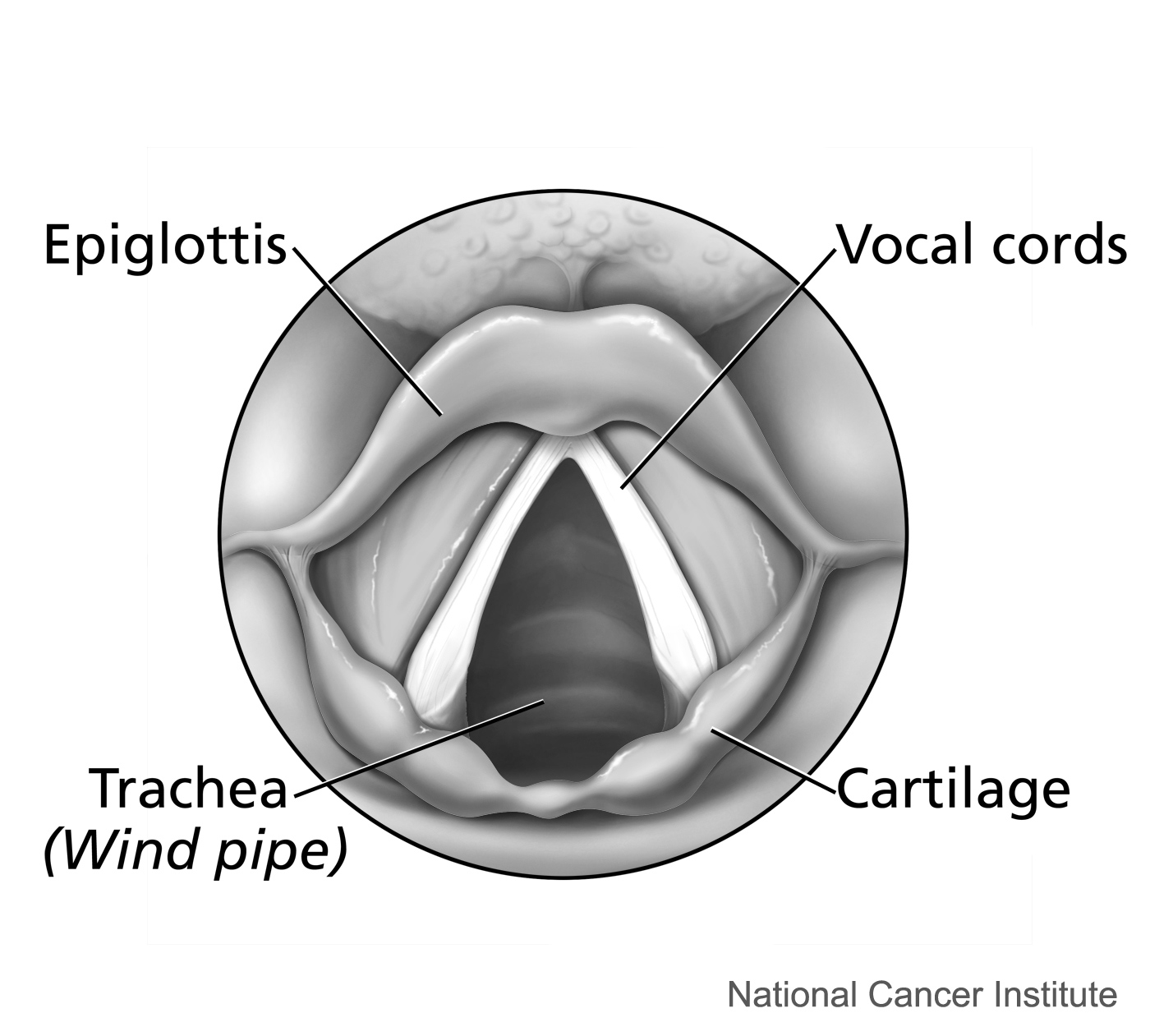
The normal larynx is a smooth passageway without abnormal growths or protrusions. Intubation granulomas are most commonly located on the posterior third portion of the larynx.

Primary treatment for intubation granulomas tends to involve surgical excision of the granuloma. However, single treatment methods alone often result in high incidences of recurrence, hence combined therapy is suggested. Secondary methods involve low dose radiotherapy and corticosteroid drug treatments. For extreme cases of refractory granulomas, in which the aforementioned treatment methods all prove ineffective, botulinum toxin injections and oral zinc sulfate treatments are administered.

Other significant risk factors are associated with intubation granuloma formation as well, such as a patient's age, sex, intubation history and pre-existing medical conditions, which indirectly predispose certain patients to intubation-related injuries.

== Signs and symptoms ==
Persistent sore throat, hoarseness, and vocal fatigue following intubation procedures are common symptoms of intubation granuloma, and patients may report mild discomfort associated with the sensation of a rough foreign body lodged in the back of the throat. These symptoms often provoke observable clinical signs such as frequent coughing, throat-clearing, and hoarseness accompanied by dysphonia, reduced voice quality and restricted vocal range. Severe intubation granulomas cause pharyngitis and pain upon pressed phonation, coughing or throat clearing. In some cases, the patient may even experience dyspnea, or shortness of breath due to airway obstruction by the granuloma.

However, since granulomas and other vocal cord polyps may take weeks or months to develop, intubation granulomas may sometimes be clinically evident only when the aforementioned symptoms persist for, or reappear after a longer period of time post-extubation. Initial symptoms may also be overlooked as they coincide with typical side-effects of intubation. Case reports of patients diagnosed and treated for intubation granulomas concur with this observation, as the diagnosis is often made weeks or months after the patient is extubated.

== Causes ==
Tracheal and laryngeal trauma leading to an intubation granuloma are caused by traumas during the intubation processes, directly resulting from technical circumstances such as specifications of the breathing tube equipment, method of insertion, and intubation duration.

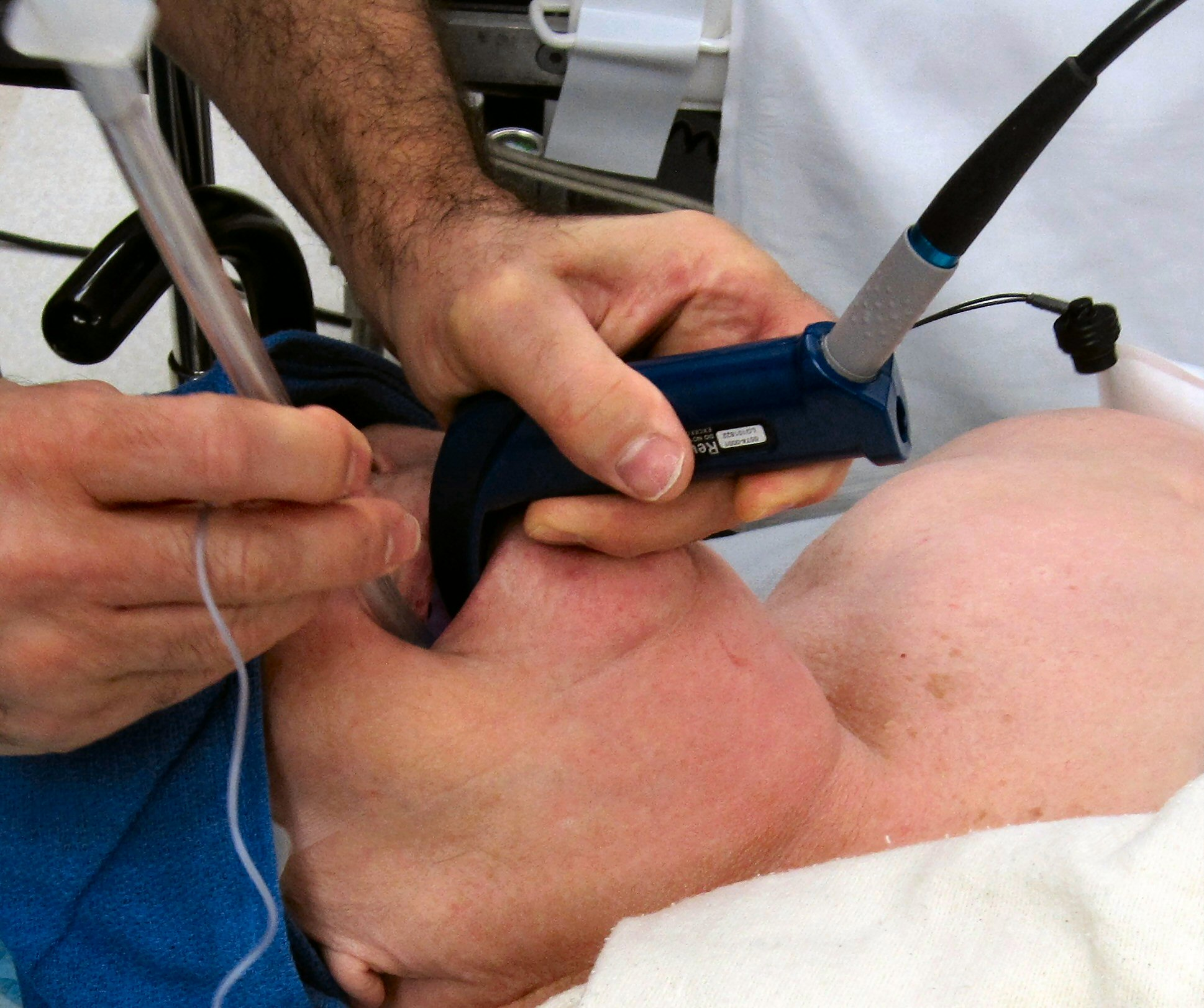
During endotracheal intubation, the breathing tube is inserted from the patient's mouth into the trachea, bypassing the larynx. Physicians must carefully manage the airway to avoid causing injury.

Intubation duration

Statistically, patients intubated for more than 48 hours will experience some form of laryngeal injury attributed to intubation, and approximately half of the injuries will result in the development of granulation tissue in the vocal fold. While there is no consensus on the maximal permissible duration of safe endotracheal intubation, the risk of trauma-related laryngeal granuloma formation increases significantly with prolonged durations of tracheal intubation. However, there are also studies which have not found statistically significant correlations between prolonged intubation duration with the degree of laryngeal injury, and intubation granuloma cases have also been reported in patients who have been intubated for only a few hours.

Intubation tube diameter

Appropriate intubation tube sizes are defined as those small enough to minimise risks of mucosal trauma while large enough to maintain adequate ventilation. This is especially important in the field of pediatrics, where the development of a child's trachea may vary according to age. Age-based calculations of appropriately sized intubation tubes are conducted in accordance with the Khine formula, which are based on internal diameters. Unfortunately, these formulas do not account for variances in outer diameter and cuff dimensions, which may result in varying tube sizes. Alternatively, height-based calculations are also available. According to PALS (2010) guidelines, the use of length-based resuscitation tapes has proven to be more accurate than age-based estimates of endotracheal intubation tubes.

Cuff pressure

The addition of an endotracheal tube cuff decreases the likelihood of selecting oversized breathing tubes for the patient, while also preventing microaspiration and the leakage of respiratory gases during intubation. However, hyperinflation of the cuff places excessive pressure on the tracheal wall, causing trauma or ischaemia to nearby tissue and hence increasing the risk of granuloma formation. Cuff pressures can be monitored during endotracheal intubation via manometers to prevent nitrous oxide induced hyperinflation. General guidelines suggest that cuff pressure should be maintained between 20 and 30 cm to minimise risks of intubation-related trauma.

== Diagnosis ==
Intubation granulomas are most commonly presented in the form of red or pale spherical lesions in the subglottis of the larynx and may be defined as protruding, inflamed fibrovascular tissue. While it is possible for intubation granulomas to form in both the larynx or trachea, they are most characteristically located in the posterior third aspect of the larynx, stemming from the posterior vocal fold directly above the vocal process cartilage. Diagnosis of granulomas are confirmed via videolaryngostroboscopy and the electromyography by identifying proliferating tissue originating in the vocal process. Furthermore, granuloma severity can be determined using screening images of laryngoscopy and graded in accordance to Farwell's grading system.

== Pathophysiology ==
When a patient lies supine, the ventilation tube tends to rest on the posterior part of the larynx, above three major potential sites of damage: the arytenoid cartilage, posterior glottis, and cricoid cartilage. Excessive pressure or friction from contact between the tube and the mucosal cell layer of the larynx, which may occur at rest or by unexpected myoclonic movement under sedation (such as coughing or swallowing), can lead to mucosal injury. Under high capillary perfusion pressure, the mucosal cells of the larynx experience pressure ischemia, leading to tissue irritation, acute inflammation, congestion and edema. Ischemic necrosis may occur, leading to erosion and ulcer formation in mucous membranes before progressing to the perichondrium and cartilage. In other cases where granulomas are found in areas not on the posterior larynx, such tissue injury can also be accounted for by accidental lacerations from the tip of the endotracheal tube or its introducer.

During prolonged intubation, constant stress on the laryngeal tissue prevents full wound recovery until the endotracheal tube is removed. Although the formation of granulation tissue is part of a typical wound healing process, incomplete healing of the mucosal layer and persistent perichondritis causes the formation of chronic, rounded, localized granulation tissue over the ulceration site. As the granulation tissue matures, other cells such as macrophages, fibroblasts and keratinocytes migrate to the granulation tissue to aid the healing process, causing fibrosis of the growth and the production of a protective epithelial layer. Ultimately, a pedunculated globular mass consisting of immune cells, fibroblasts, myofibroblasts, keratinocytes and endothelial cells is formed.

In some cases, the granuloma has been reported to regress after extubation without any medical intervention. However, if the granuloma is not removed and continues to proliferate, this may pose further health risks to the patient, such as airway obstruction or stenosis. In future intubations, even more caution would be required to perform the procedure while avoiding disruption of the granuloma.

== Treatment ==
The main treatment of intubation-related laryngeal granulomas is microlaryngeal surgical excision, but low dose radiotherapy and other drugs such as corticosteroids, botulinum toxin and zinc sulfate are also used in support to treat related symptoms or manage granuloma recurrence.

Surgical excision

The main treatment of intubation-related laryngeal granulomas is microlaryngeal surgical excision of the granuloma under anesthesia. Excision surgeries can be performed by cold steel excision or laser ablations—Laser surgeries permit more accurate excisions and hence reduce risks of damaging surrounding tissues. This method can be further accompanied by jet ventilation, which minimises intubation trauma and reduces risks of edema and barotrauma by providing ventilation over stenosis. A thin cannula and catheter can be further used in place of traditional small-diameter endotracheal tubes during surgery, which enables precise visualisation of anatomical configurations within the surgical field. Employing infraglottic transtracheal routes for microlaryngeal surgery is more effective than supraglottic methods as it provides ventilation under vocal cords, which causes minimal vocal cord movement.

However, excision surgeries alone usually result in high incidences of granuloma recurrence. Consequently, surgical approaches are usually accompanied by low dose radiotherapy, corticosteroids and botulinum toxin treatment.

Low dose radiotherapy

Low dose radiotherapy ranging between 800 and 3000 cGy (centigray) has been documented to have a high successful prevention and resolution of laryngeal granulomas. The optimal period for radiotherapy treatment is immediately after surgical excision, preferably prior to injury-stimulated tissue proliferation.

Corticosteroids

Corticosteroid drug treatments can be administered orally and through inhalation. Inhaled steroids have the greatest efficacy in resolving reducing local inflammation of the granuloma. The most commonly prescribed inhaled steroid, budesonide, can resolve intubation granulomas within 12 months of treatment.

However, due to the side effects of steroidal interventions, antibiotics have to be prescribed alongside to reduce pain and inflammation in the region of the target granuloma.

Botulinum toxin and zinc sulfate

Botulinum toxin (BOTOX) and zinc sulfate treatments are mainly applied to cases of refractory granulomas, which are immune to previously mentioned treatment methods.

Intralaryngeal BOTOX injections bind specifically and non-competitively to presynaptic cholinergic neuron membranes at neuromuscular junctions which induce zinc-dependent cleavage of proteins involved in neuroexocytosis. The breakdown of neuroexocytosis proteins block acetylcholine secretions which inhibit hypertonicity, strengthen antagonist muscles and restore the balance of forces. Since laryngeal granuloma formations are exacerbated by repeated forceful contraction of the glottis, the combined effects of the toxin induce thyroarytenoid paresis and decreases the force of vocal fold adduction which inhibit forced contact between vocal processes, hence facilitating granuloma resolution.

Oral zinc sulfate treatments are advantageous due to their ability to preserve the anatomical and functional integrity of the vocal cords. Similarly, this form of therapy can achieve quick relief of granuloma-related symptoms whilst avoiding invasive surgery and toxic drug effects.

== Epidemiology ==
Intubation granuloma onset has been found to be more prevalent in certain demographics due to their associated anatomical characteristics. The physiological differences due to age, gender, or inherited features may place such patients at an increased risk of intubation injury, and subsequently the occurrence of intubation granulomas.

Age

Pediatric and geriatric patients are at higher risk of laryngeal injury. Compared to adults, newborns and young children possess a higher, more anterior larynx, a larger and stiffer epiglottis as well as a more fragile laryngotracheal mucosa, making them more vulnerable to traumatic damage by prolonged tracheal intubation. In addition, the fragility of the mucous larynx increases with age, leaving the patient more prone to intubation-induced tracheal and laryngeal injuries.

Gender

Females were found to be at greater risk of intubation granulomas as they tend to have a narrower glottis, lower glottic proportion and a thinner arytenoid mucochondrium. 75% to 90% of intubation granulomas found in the vocal cords are reported in female patients. Furthermore, females displayed greater postintubation pharyngitis, which have led to increased incidence of intubation granulomas.

Anatomical characteristics

Congenital and/or acquired abnormalities of the larynx—laryngeal webs, bands, cysts and tumours—are predisposing risk factors of intubation granuloma. In addition, facial and cervical anomalies, short necks, receding chins and obesity can heighten the difficulty in successful laryngoscopy, predisposing the patient to traumatic intubation as their airway becomes more challenging to navigate during the intubation process.
