= Anton Arnold =

Austrian opera singer

Anton Arnold (31 January 1880 – 13 July 1954) was an Austrian operatic tenor of Danube Swabians origin.

Anton Arnold in Olmütz, 1909

Anton Arnold as "David" in Wagner's "Die Meistersinger von Nürnberg" (Ratisbon, December 1910)

== Life ==
Born in Weißkirchen, Transleithania, Austria-Hungary, Arnold studied with Paul Greiff and Laura Hilgermann. His debut took place in 1909 at the Stadttheater in Olomouc. Further stations of his career were Teplitz-Schönau, Regensburg and Dortmund and from 1914 the Breslau Opera house. After an engagement at the k.k. priv. Carltheater in Vienna, in 1916 he joined the Vienna Court Opera (later Vienna State Opera).

Arnold also performed in his hometown Bela Crkva. In return for his concert tours in the USA after the First World War, he provided the charity of the Viennese Swabian Society with 16 million Kronen for children in need. After the end of the war Arnold owned and directed the German-language theatre in Timișoara for a short time.

In 1919 Arnold created the figure of the Hunchback in the world premiere of Strauss' Die Frau ohne Schatten.

In 1938 he appeared at the Salzburg Festival as Balthasar Zorn in the 1938 performance of "Die Meistersinger von Nürnberg" under Wilhelm Furtwängler. In 1941 he was a guest at the Vienna Volksoper, where he had already performed as a choir singer in 1909. He recorded several records between 1916-1918. Since the 1920s he was often heard on Austrian radio, and gave concerts until 1948 with an unchanged beautiful voice.

Arnold had three children, including the physician and pianist Gottfried Eduard Arnold. Arnold died in Vienna at age 74.

== Sources ==
- K. J. Kutsch, Leo Riemens: Großes Sängerlexikon. Unchanged edition. K. G. Saur, Bern, 1993, third supplementary volume, Sp. 31, ISBN 3-907820-70-3
- Robert Rohr: Unser klingendes Erbe. Beiträge zur Musikgeschichte der Deutschen und ihrer Nachbarn in und aus Südosteuropa unter besonderer Berücksichtigung der Donauschwaben. Von den Anfängen bis 1918. Verlag Passavia, Passau, 1988, ISBN 3-87616-134-7. Pp. 235f, 301.
