= Al-Mabda' =

Iraqi political newspaper

Al-Mabda' (Arabic: المبدأ, 'The Principle') was a communist Arabic-language daily newspaper published from Baghdad, Iraq. The paper was founded by the dissident communist politician Daud as-Sayegh (who had just broken away from the original Iraqi Communist Party). The first issue of Al-Mabda' was published on 21 November 1959. The newspaper was allegedly supported by the government of Abd al-Karim Qasim. According to Neue Zürcher Zeitung, the Qassim government had issued a substantial loan to as-Sayegh for the sake of publishing al-Mabda'.

In early 1960 two editorial secretaries of al-Mabda', Kazim Shawi and Adb al-Amir Hassun al-Haddad, resigned from as-Sayeghs party. In June 1960 al-Madba' issued an appeal to the members of the (original) Iraqi Communist Party to join as-Sayegh's party. In November 1960 Al-Madba' was closed down, with no public explanation.

Al-Mabda' was re-launched as a weekly on 4 February 1961. At the time, al-Mabda' stated that the November 1960 disruption in publication had been caused by an urgent lack of funds. Al-Mabda' complained that the newspaper was treated with intense hostility from other leftwing sectors, and its readers frequently attacked in public. All in all, twenty-two issues of al-Mabda' were published in its second year of existence. On 25 November 1961 an anniversary issue was released, in which al-Mabda' criticized the unwillingness of the followers of the (original) Iraqi Communist Party to join the ranks of as-Sayegh's legal Iraqi Communist Party.
