= Granuloma =

Inflammatory aggregation of immune cells

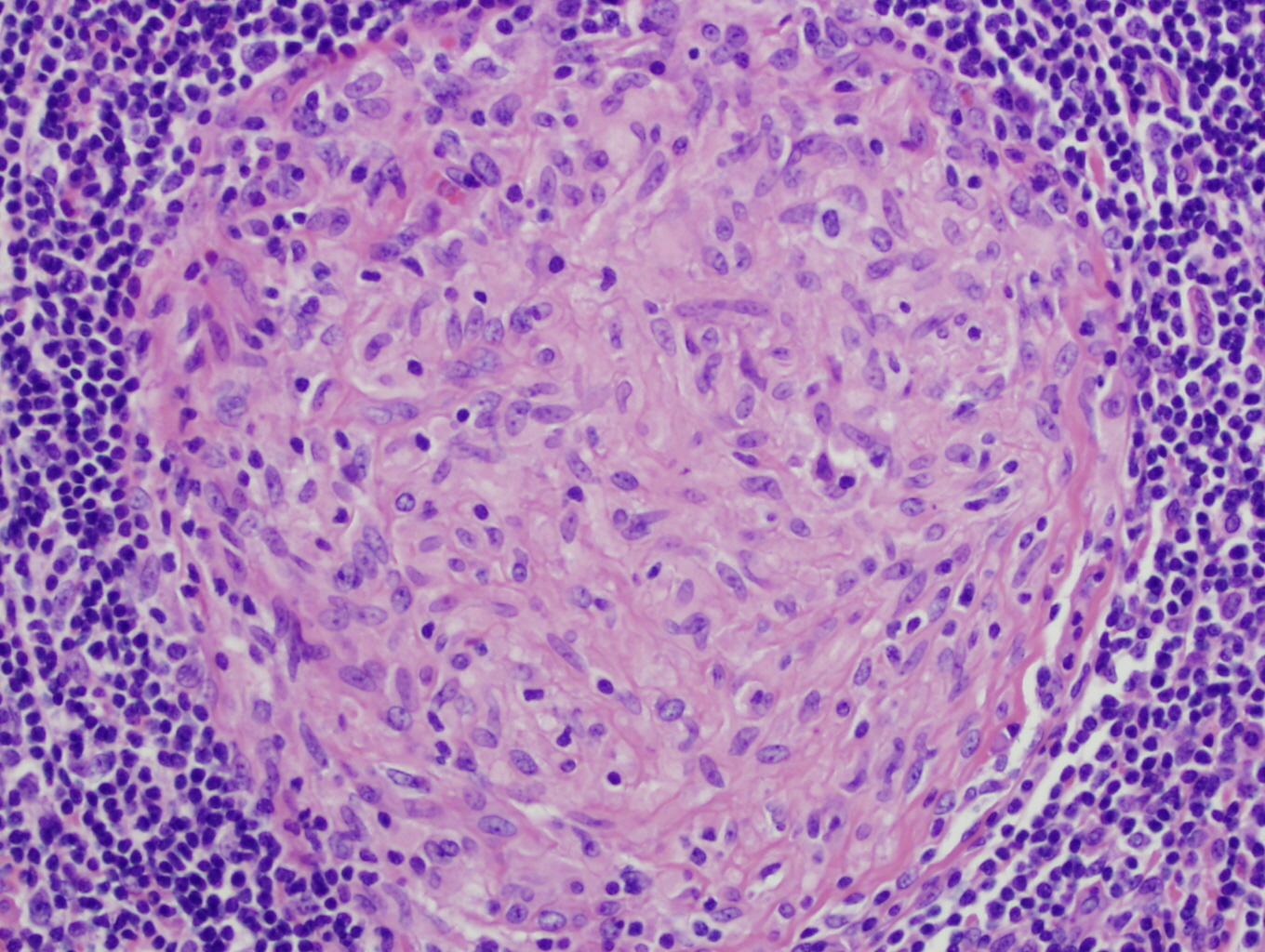
- Picture of a granuloma (without necrosis) as seen through a microscope on a glass slide: The tissue on the slide is stained with two standard dyes (hematoxylin: blue, eosin: pink) to make it visible. The granuloma in this picture was found in a lymph node of a patient with a Mycobacterium avium infection.
- Specialty: Pathology

A granuloma (pl. granulomata) is an aggregation of macrophages (along with other cells) that forms in response to chronic inflammation. This occurs when the immune system attempts to isolate foreign substances that it is otherwise unable to eliminate. Such substances include infectious organisms including bacteria and fungi, as well as other materials such as foreign objects, keratin, and suture fragments.

== Definition ==
In pathology, a granuloma is an organized collection of macrophages.

In medical practice, doctors occasionally use the term granuloma in its more literal meaning: "a small nodule". Since a small nodule can represent any tissue from a harmless nevus to a malignant tumor, this use of the term is not very specific. Examples of this use of the term granuloma are the lesions known as vocal cord granuloma (known as contact granuloma), pyogenic granuloma, and intubation granuloma, all of which are examples of granulation tissue, not granulomas. "Pulmonary hyalinizing granuloma" is a lesion characterized by keloid-like fibrosis in the lung and is not granulomatous. Similarly, radiologists often use the term granuloma when they see a calcified nodule on X-ray or CT scan of the chest. They make this assumption since granulomas usually contain calcium, although the cells that form a granuloma are too tiny to be seen by a radiologist. The most accurate use of the term granuloma requires a pathologist to examine surgically removed and stained (specially colored) tissue under a microscope.

Macrophages, specifically histiocytes, are the cells that define a granuloma. They often fuse to form multinucleated Langhans giant cells. The macrophages in granulomas are often referred to as "epithelioid", referring to the vague resemblance of these macrophages to epithelial cells. Epithelioid macrophages differ from ordinary macrophages in that they have elongated nuclei that often resemble the sole of a slipper or shoe. They also have larger nuclei than ordinary macrophages, and their cytoplasm is typically pinker when stained with eosin. These changes are thought to be a consequence of "activation" of the macrophage by the offending antigen.

The other key term in the above definition is the word "organized" which refers to a tight, ball-like formation. The macrophages in these formations are typically so tightly clustered that the borders of individual cells are difficult to distinguish. Loosely dispersed macrophages are not considered to be granulomas.

All granulomas, regardless of cause, may contain additional cells and matrix. These include lymphocytes, neutrophils, eosinophils, multinucleated giant cells, fibroblasts, and collagen (fibrosis). The additional cells are sometimes a clue to the cause of the granuloma. For example, granulomas with numerous eosinophils may be a clue to coccidioidomycosis or allergic bronchopulmonary fungal disease, and granulomas with numerous neutrophils suggest blastomycosis, granulomatosis with polyangiitis, aspiration pneumonia, or cat-scratch disease.

In terms of the underlying cause, the difference between granulomas and other types of inflammation is that granulomas form in response to antigens that are resistant to "first-responder" inflammatory cells such as neutrophils and eosinophils. The antigen causing the formation of a granuloma is most often an infectious pathogen or a substance foreign to the body, but sometimes the offending antigen is unknown, as in sarcoidosis.

Granulomas are seen in a wide variety of diseases, both infectious and non-infectious. Infections characterized by granulomas include tuberculosis, leprosy, histoplasmosis, cryptococcosis, coccidioidomycosis, blastomycosis, and cat-scratch disease. Examples of non-oninfectious granulomatous diseases are sarcoidosis, Crohn's disease, berylliosis, granulomatosis with polyangiitis, eosinophilic granulomatosis with polyangiitis, pulmonary rheumatoid nodules, and aspiration of food and other particulate material into the lung.

=== Caseating vs non-caseating ===
An important feature of granulomas is whether or not they contain necrosis, which refers to dead cells that, under the microscope, appear as a mass of formless debris with no nuclei present. A related term, caseation (literally: turning to cheese), refers to a form of necrosis that, to the unaided eye, appears cheese-like ("caseous"), and is typically a feature of the granulomas of tuberculosis. The identification of necrosis in granulomas is important because granulomas with necrosis tend to have infectious causes. There are several exceptions to this general rule, but it nevertheless remains useful in day-to-day diagnostic pathology.

Necrosis in granulomas

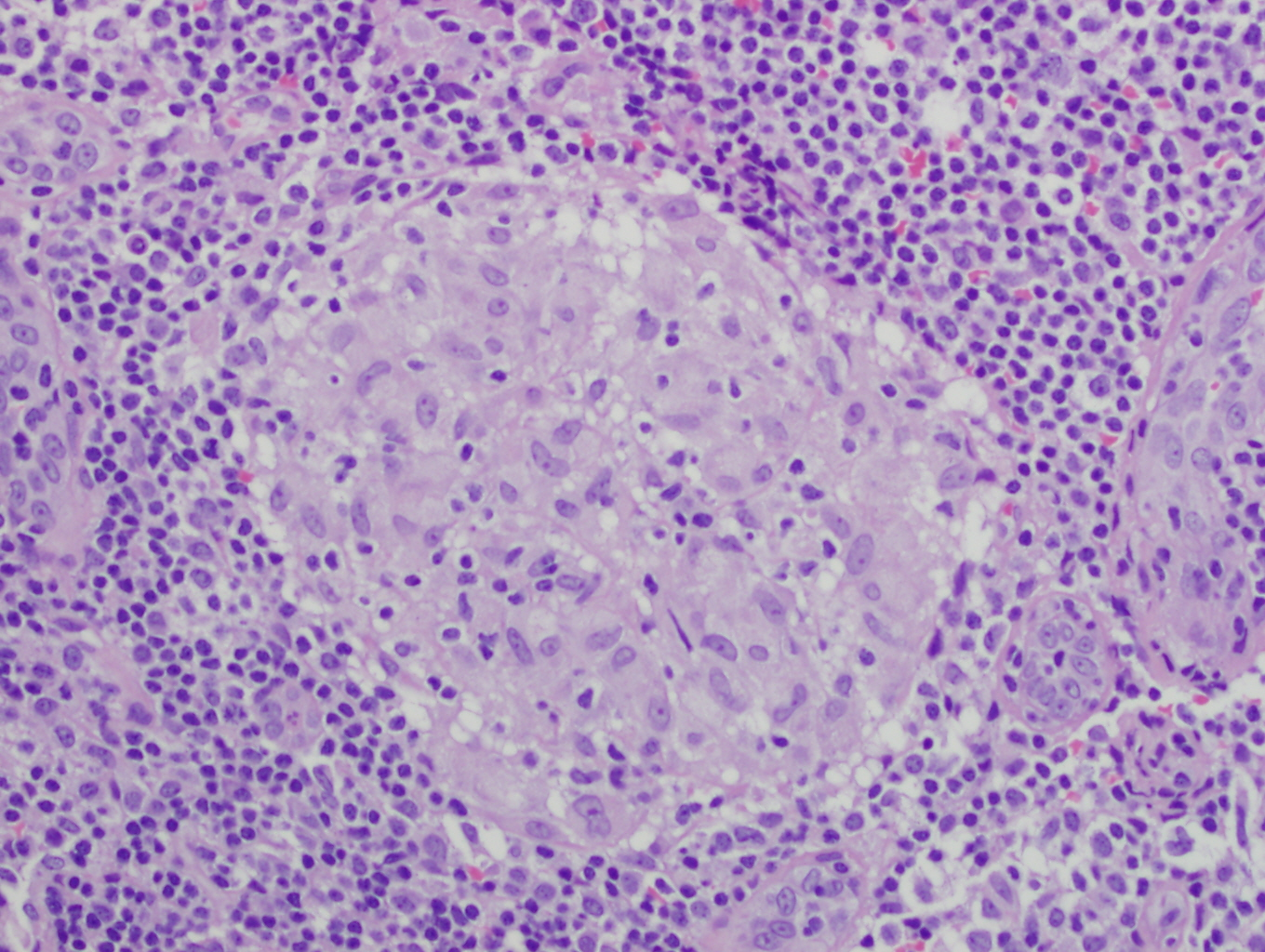
Granuloma without necrosis in a lymph node of a person with sarcoidosis

Granuloma with central necrosis in a lung of a person with tuberculosis: Note the Langhans-type giant cells (with many nuclei arranged in a horseshoe-like pattern at the edge of the cell) around the periphery of the granuloma. Langhans-type giant cells are seen in many types of granulomas and are not specific for tuberculosis.

== Diseases with granulomas ==
=== Tuberculosis ===
Mycobacterium tuberculosis can cause the granulomas of tuberculosis which tend to contain necrosis ("caseating tubercules"), but non-necrotizing granulomas may also be present. Multinucleated giant cells with nuclei arranged like a horseshoe (Langhans giant cell) and foreign body giant cells are often present, but are not specific for tuberculosis. A definitive diagnosis of tuberculosis requires identification of the causative organism by microbiologic cultures.

=== Leprosy ===
In leprosy, granulomas are found in the skin and tend to involve nerves. The appearance of the granulomas differs according to the precise type of leprosy.

=== Aquarium granuloma ===
The other Mycobacterium species, Mycobacterium marinum, can cause a rare infection known as "aquarium granuloma".

=== Schistosomiasis ===
Some schistosome eggs that are laid in intestinal and urinary venules backwash into the liver through the portal vein, causing granuloma formation in the liver.

=== Histoplasmosis ===
Granulomas are seen in most forms of histoplasmosis (acute histoplasmosis, histoplasmoma, chronic histoplasmosis). Histoplasma organisms can sometimes be demonstrated within the granulomas by biopsy or microbiological cultures.

=== Cryptococcosis ===
When Cryptococcus infection occurs in persons whose immune systems are intact, granulomatous inflammation is typically encountered. The granulomas can be necrotizing or non-necrotizing. Using a microscope and appropriate stains, organisms can be seen within the granulomas.

=== Cat-scratch disease ===
Cat-scratch disease is an infection caused by Bartonella henselae bacteria, typically following a scratch by a kitten infected with the organism. The granulomas in this disease are found in the lymph nodes draining the site of the scratch. They are characteristically suppurative (pus-forming), containing large numbers of neutrophils. Organisms are usually difficult to find within the granulomas using methods routinely used in pathology laboratories.

=== Rheumatic fever ===
Rheumatic fever is a systemic disease affecting the periarteriolar connective tissue and can occur after an untreated group A, beta-hemolytic streptococcal pharyngeal infection. It is believed to be caused by antibody cross-reactivity.

=== Sarcoidosis ===
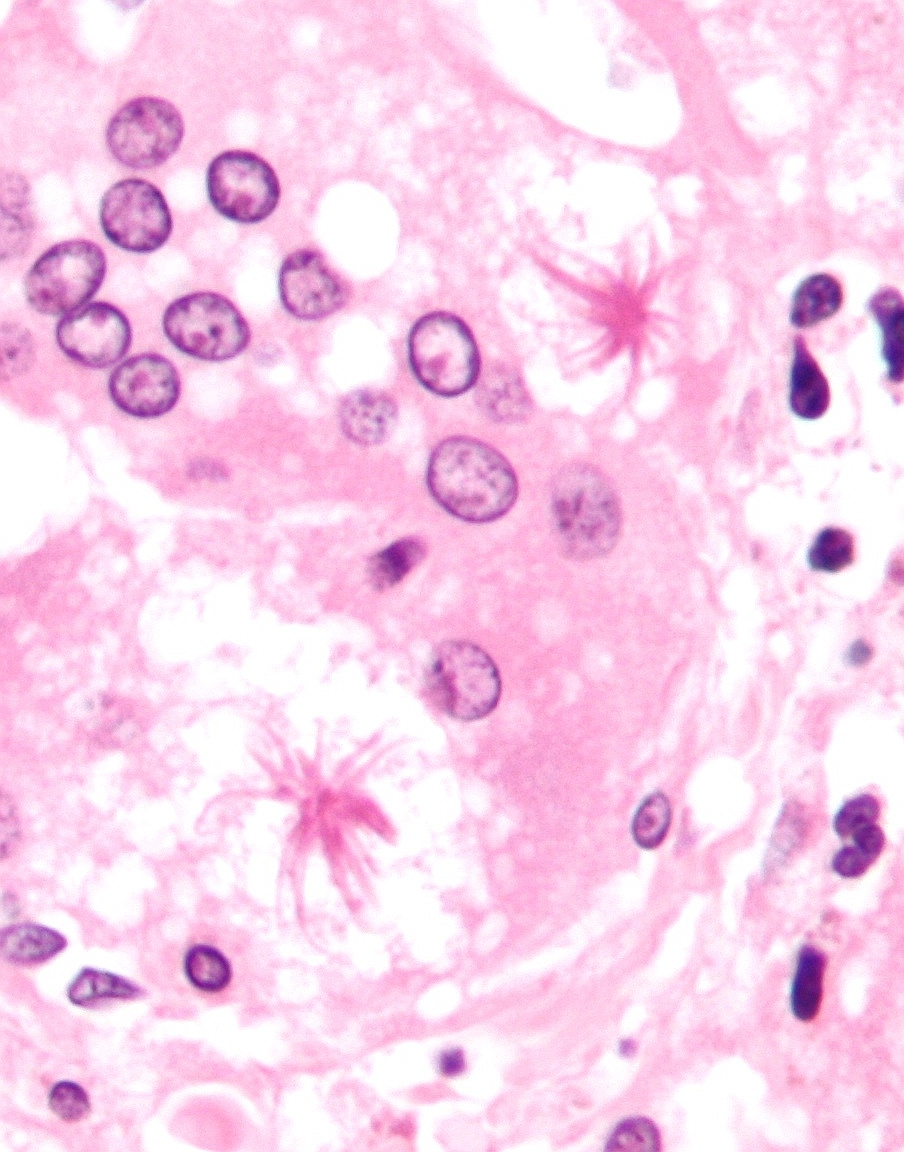
Two asteroid bodies in sarcoidosis, H&E stain

Sarcoidosis is a disease of unknown cause characterized by non-necrotizing ("non-caseating") granulomas in multiple organs and body sites, most commonly the lungs and lymph nodes within the chest cavity. Other common sites of involvement include the liver, spleen, skin, and eyes. The granulomas of sarcoidosis are similar to those of tuberculosis and other infectious granulomatous diseases. In most cases of sarcoidosis, though, the granulomas do not contain necrosis and are surrounded by concentric scar tissue (fibrosis). Sarcoid granulomas often contain star-shaped structures called asteroid bodies or lamellar structures termed Schaumann bodies, but these structures are not specific for sarcoidosis. Sarcoid granulomas can resolve spontaneously without complications or heal with residual scarring. In the lungs, this scarring can cause a condition known as pulmonary fibrosis that impairs breathing. In the heart, it can lead to rhythm disturbances, heart failure, and even death.

=== Crohn's disease ===
Crohn's disease is an inflammatory condition of uncertain cause characterized by severe inflammation in the wall of the intestines and other parts of the abdomen. Within the inflammation in the gut wall, granulomas are often found and are a clue to the diagnosis.

=== Listeria monocytogenes ===
Listeria monocytogenes infection in infants can cause potentially fatal disseminated granulomas, called granulomatosis infantiseptica, following in utero infection.

=== Leishmania spp. ===
Leishmaniases are a group of human diseases caused by Leishmania genus and transmitted by a sandfly bite can lead to granulomatous inflammation in skin (cutaneous form of the disease) and liver (visceral form), with research suggesting effective granuloma formation to be desirable in the resolution of the disease.

=== Pneumocystis pneumonia ===
Pneumocystis infection in the lungs is usually not associated with granulomas, but rare cases are well-documented to cause granulomatous inflammation. The diagnosis is established by finding Pneumocystis yeasts within the granulomas on lung biopsies.

=== Aspiration pneumonia ===
Aspiration pneumonia is typically caused by aspiration of bacteria from the oral cavity into the lungs, and does not result in the formation of granulomas. Granulomas may form, though, when food particles or other particulate substances such as pill fragments are aspirated into the lungs. Patients typically aspirate food because they have esophageal, gastric, or neurologic problems. Intake of drugs that depress neurologic function may also lead to aspiration. The resultant granulomas are typically found around the airways (bronchioles), and are often accompanied by foreign body-type, multinucleated giant cells, acute inflammation, or organizing pneumonia. The finding of food particles in lung biopsies is diagnostic.

=== Rheumatoid arthritis ===
Necrotizing granulomas can develop in patients with rheumatoid arthritis, typically manifesting as bumps in the soft tissues around the joints (so-called rheumatoid nodules) or in the lungs.

=== Granuloma annulare ===
Granuloma annulare is a skin disease of unknown cause in which granulomas are found in the dermis of the skin, but it is not a true granuloma. Typically, a central zone of necrobiotic generation of collagen is seen, with surrounding inflammation and mucin deposition on pathology.

=== Foreign-body granuloma ===
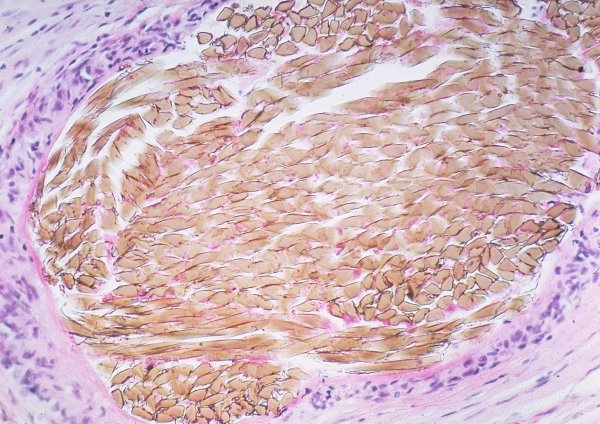
Granulomatous reaction to nylon suture material

A foreign-body granuloma occurs when a foreign body (such as a wood splinter, piece of metal or glass, etc.) penetrates the body's soft tissue, followed by acute inflammation and formation of a granuloma. In some cases the foreign body can be found and removed even years after the precipitating event.

=== Childhood granulomatous periorificial dermatitis ===
Childhood granulomatous periorificial dermatitis is a rare granulomatous skin disorder of unknown cause. It is temporary and tends to affect children, usually of African descent.

== Granulomas associated with vasculitis ==
Certain inflammatory diseases are characterised by a combination of granulomatous inflammation and vasculitis (inflammation of the blood vessels). Both the granulomas as well as the vasculitis tend to occur in association with necrosis. Classic examples of such diseases include granulomatosis with polyangiitis and eosinophilic granulomatosis with polyangiitis.

== Etymology ==
The term is from Latin grānulum 'small grain' and -oma, a suffix used to indicate tumors or masses. The plural is granulomas or granulomata. The adjective granulomatous means "characterized by granulomas".

== See also ==
- Contact granuloma, i.e. "throat granuloma"
- Lick granuloma, a skin disorder in dogs that results from dog's urge to lick the lower portion of their leg
- Sperm granuloma
