= Communicology =

Communicology is the scholarly and academic study of how people create and use messages to affect the social environment. Communicology is an academic discipline that distinguishes itself from the broader field of human communication with its exclusive use of scientific methods to study communicative phenomena. The goals of these scientific methods are to create and extend theory-based knowledge about the processes and outcomes of communication. Practitioners in the communicology discipline employ empirical and deductive research methods, such as cross-sectional and longitudinal surveys, experiments, meta-analyses, and content analyses, to test theoretically-derived hypotheses. Correlational and causal relationships between communication variables are tested in these studies.

Researchers of communicology explore specific functions of communication. Such functions might include interpersonal communication, message processing, and persuasion. Researcher might also situate their studies in different contexts, such as intercultural communication, health communication, intergroup communication, technology-mediated communication, and small group communication. Findings from communicology link research to several different perspectives from the social sciences, natural sciences, and medicine.

== Etymology and definitions ==
The word communicology has its roots in Latin from commūnicō, meaning to share or impart, and -logia, meaning the “study of.” The academic study of human communication focuses on the use of messages to impart, inform, and participate in dialogue. Charles Horton Cooley described the system of communication as “a tool, a progressive invention, whose improvements react upon mankind and alter the life of every individual and institution.” The adjective form of commūnicō, communis, is translated as “to make common.” An important pursuit in the academic study of human communication is to understand how meaning is created through the messages shared between interaction partners. Although various attempts have been made to label the scientific study of communication, including “communication sciences” and “communication studies,” such terms have been used to reference broad and all-encompassing approaches to studying messages. The label communicology narrows the scope of studying human communication by focusing solely on scientific approaches to message construction, production, and exchange.

== History ==
The study of human communication originated in ancient Macedonia and Rome with notable philosophers, such as Socrates, Cicero, and Plato. Students of this early study of communication pursued knowledge on public rhetoric, oratory, and persuasion. Interest in the modern study of human communication intensified with burgeoning technology and it soon grew into a legitimate field following World War I and World War II.

The modern study of communication in the U.S. can be traced to four influential forefathers: Paul Lazarsfeld, Kurt Lewin, Harold Lasswell, and Carl Hovland. Lazarsfeld, who was trained as a mathematician, was influenced by socialism. His training in mathematics made him gravitate toward the methodology of communication rather than its content. Lazarsfeld, however, did engage in some theorizing about the effects of propaganda on its viewers. His two-step flow of communication model is still used today to describe how information diffuses into public opinion. Harold Lasswell was interested in power dynamics that existed in politics. Lasswell used various approaches to understanding the media effects of propaganda messages, including his initial studies using critical and qualitative designs and his later quantitative studies. He was influenced largely by pragmatism and Freudian thought. Lasswell's best known contribution to the communication field is his model of communication. Kurt Lewin began as an experimental psychologist at the University of Berlin. Although some of his work after he moved to the U.S. focused on applied or action research, Lewin's largest contributions to scientific understanding were based on his theoretically-derived research. His approach to studying psychology was largely guided by the natural sciences, particularly physics, and medicine. Carl Hovland was the director of experimental studies for propaganda research during World War II. Hovland was interested in the persuasion of propaganda, including ideas involving attitudes, credibility, and fear appeals. Hovland's approach to studying persuasion was influenced by Freudian psychoanalytics theory and Clark Hull's behaviorism and stimulus-response theory. During his post as the Director of the Institute of Human Relations at Yale University, Hovland addressed a large number of social problems in his research using multidisciplinary approaches.

Following World War II, the study of propaganda and, more broadly, human interactions did not rest. The forefathers understood the importance of studying message creation and exchange. They developed communication centers and institutes at their own home institutions. The modern study of human communication in the decades that followed grew in the kinds of topics researchers studied and the different methodological approaches from which these topics were studied. Scholars began to address message-related topics of interest to them in subfields such as health communication, mass communication, interpersonal communication, intercultural communication, persuasion and social influence, political communication, and communication technology. These scholars approached theorizing about and researching human communication using various ontological and epistemological approaches, including rhetorical, semiotic, phenomenological, cybernetic, sociopsychological, sociocultural, and critical traditions. The term “communication” used to describe the collection of these vastly different traditions is now so broad and encompassing that it means everything and, at the same time, nothing.

By the end of the 20th century, the scholarly and academic domains of any communication department might include performance components (e.g., performance of literature; storytelling), humanities components (e.g., rhetorical analyses; critical analyses); social science components (e.g., scientific experimentation), and medical/biological components (e.g., speech pathology, audiology). Communication departments are also commonly the home of professional training in media-related topics, such as journalism, media production, Web design, and telecommunications. Some universities have attempted to house multiple independent departments that focus exclusively on targeted aspects of communication under larger “colleges of communication.”

The large breadth of the communication field meant that rhetoricians and critical cultural scholars were housed in the same departments as quantitative social scientists and even neuroscientists. Although these disparate learners of communication are ostensibly situated to tackle similar message-related research problems, the methodological approaches they use to resolve these problems vastly differ. The subset of communication researchers who practice theory development and theory building using scientific research methods, such as quantitative survey designs, experiments, quantitative content analysis, and meta-analysis, fall under the label communicologists. Programs such as the College of Communication at Michigan State University, Department of Communication at University of California, Santa Barbara, and Department of Communication at University of Arizona have, for several decades, directed their research production toward studying human communication from a communicological approach. More recently, programs like the Department of Communicology at the University of Hawai‘i at Mānoa have been created to underscore the exclusively scientific paradigmatic approach shared by all researchers in the department.

== Primary Functions of Human Communication in Communicology ==
Human communication in the study of communicology is examined through a functional approach, a general perspective used to describe what humans do with communication. Communicology begins with the primary assumption that the overarching goal of communication is to create understanding. No matter what reason we have for communicating with another interactant, we simply cannot achieve that purpose without initiating a state of mutual understanding with him or her. In essence, the primary function of all human communication is to get others to hold the same mental representation that we have in our minds.

Secondary reasons for communicating with others also exist, which generally involve goals of influence. For example, we might attempt to get a person to like us more in the pursuit of a friendship or a romantic relationship. Interactants might attempt to use communication to define and negotiate the nature of their relationship with each other, enacting what is known as relational influence. This interpersonal function of communication is present in every communicative situation, whether between two people, two corporations, or even two nation states. Social influence goals can also include using communication to instill specific beliefs in another person, influencing his or her attitudes toward some idea or object. The function of social influence is to persuade a person or induce compliance using requests or communicating desires.

== Major Schools of Thought ==
Communicological approaches have been aimed at developing theory-based knowledge using scientific methods. Communicologists often subscribe to postpositivist views of theory construction and theory refinement. Two views guide the study of human communication from a communicological standpoint: the view of communicology as a social science and as a natural science.

The view of communicology as a social science is guided by an understanding that social systems and cultures can introduce variability in communication patterns within and across groups of individuals. The social scientific approach is generally concerned with the way humans relate to each other by forming beliefs, attitudes, and stereotypes about them. For decades, a leading question in the study of human communication from a social scientific approach has been how context of the interactants involved in message exchange plays a role in how messages are interpreted. For instance, whereas the question of why people smile might lie in the province of medical or natural scientific approaches to studying communicology, answering questions about the variability between two cultural groups in smiling behaviors following exposure to a stimulus lies within the grasp of the social sciences. In understanding why people engage in specific behaviors, the social scientific approach to communicology references the mental processes underlying mental activity that give rise to the behavior. Perception, attitudes, reasoning, thinking, memory, and emotions, all things that can be directly influenced by one's environment, are taken into consideration when explaining, predicting, and controlling (i.e., the functions of theory-based knowledge) human behaviors.

The view of communicology as a natural science is guided by an understanding that humans’ communicative behaviors can be best explained as a function of our biologically-engineered responses, which are, to some extent, predetermined by our evolutionary origins. The basis for this view is that human communication that is employed for cooperation and collaboration served as an important historical adaptive advantage over several millennia. Largely guided by the work of Charles Darwin, the natural science view of communicology attempts to locate communicative behaviors that are common to and unite humans, and attribute these linguistic commonalities to an evolutionary problem for which it solved. The natural science approach also references recent developments in neuropsychological and cognitive sciences to explain human behaviors. Scholars of communicology address topics such as linguistic diversity in relation to parasite stress, the neurochemistry underlying certain media addictions, and unconscious and automatic behaviors related to the development of habits. The physiology and neurostructures of the human body are of interest to those who study communicology from this natural science perspective.

== Alternative Meanings of Communicology ==
The term ‘communicology’ has been adopted worldwide by the International Communicology Institute (Communicology.org) to refer to a human science (qualitative) approach to human communication research. Communicology has been used to describe a discipline under the broader field of communication that uses logic-based semiotic and phenomenological methods to study human consciousness and behavioral embodiment. This method of studying human consciousness and embodiment can be traced to Edmund Husserl, the Father of Phenomenology, and later inspired by the works of Maurice Merleau-Ponty, Michel Foucault, and Charles Peirce. Cognate subfields recognized under this label include art communicology, clinical communicology, media communicology, and philosophy communicology. Understanding of human communication processes is developed using qualitative methodologies in this discipline of study.

The International Academy of Communicology publishes “Communicology: International Scientific Journal,” a periodical dedicated to research reports on “the theory and practice of public relations, media and communications, the basic theory of communication, sociology of mass communications, image making skills, as well as problems of formation of non-material values (image, publicity, brand, reputation, etc.).Doctor of sociology, Professor, honored worker of science of the Russian Federation, President of the International Academy of communication Felix Izosimovich Sharkov published the following monographs, encyclopedic dictionaries, textbooks on communication: Communication: encyclopedic dictionary-reference/F. I. Sharkov. Moscow: Publishing and trading Corporation " Dashkov & Co.", 2009. 768 p.; Communicology: Sociology of mass communication: textbook/F. I. Sharkov. Moscow: Publishing and trading Corporation " Dashkov & Co.", 2009. 320 PP.; Communicology: communication consulting: textbook/F. I. Sharkov. Moscow: Publishing and trading Corporation " Dashkov & Co.", 2010. 408 p.; Communicology: fundamentals of communication theory. Textbook for bachelors/F. I. Sharkov. Moscow: Publishing and trading Corporation " Dashkov & Co.", 2012. 488 PP.; Communicology: theory and practice of mass media: Textbook / Sharkov F. I., Silkin V. V.-Moscow: Dashkov & Kо, 2017. - 160 PP.; Sharkov F.I., Silkin V.V. Theory and practice of mass information as a fundamental direction of communicology /Ed. F.I. Sharkov. M6 Dashkov and Ko.” Most uses of the term communicology do not correspond to how the "social science" (quantitative methods) term has been adopted and used at the University of Hawaii.

There is also a Norwegian group of scientists, that in strong connection to John Grinder developed a meta discipline in the 1970s with the same name. Drawing from system thinkers of all time. Their aim is to classify knowledge and extract a set of key factors and basic processes that all of communication and change have in common. Focusing on common key factors allows their students to make their knowledge useable and deliver changework more effectively within their frames of work. It’s the systemic understanding and the clear focus on the processes beyond context and content that make this scientific work so special.

== See also ==
- animal communication
- semiotics
