= Associations Law =

1960 Iraqi law which legally regulated political parties

The Associations Law was a law in Iraq, which legally regulated political parties. The law was promulgated on 1 January 1960. Prior to the adoption of this law, political parties had been banned since 1954. The law came into force on 6 January 1960 (Army Day).

Under this law, a party applying for legal status at the Ministry of Interior should have at least ten members (all Iraqi citizens) and at least 50 supporters. Article 4 of the law stated that an association registered under the law could not have goals that were incompatible with the independence and national unity of Iraq or the republican and democratic character of the state.

On 9 January 1960, four political parties applied for registration under the new law; the National Democratic Party, the Democratic Party of Iraqi Kurdistan, main Iraqi Communist Party (i.e. the Itihad ash-Sha'ab group) and Daud as-Sayegh's splinter Iraqi Communist Party. On 2 February 1960 two more parties applied for recognition, the Islamic Party and the Hizb ut-Tahrir. On 11 February 1960 the Republican Party applied for recognition and on 29 June 1960 the National Progressive Party submitted its application. The parties awarded recognition were as-Sayegh's Communist Party, the National Democratic Party, the Democratic Party of Iraqi Kurdistan (all on 10 February 1960), the Islamic Party (26 April 1960) and the National Progressive Party (29 July 1960). The mainstream communists, Hizb ut-Tahrir and the Republican Party remained illegal entities. The mainstream Communist Party tried to register itself a second time on 15 February 1960, under the name 'People's Unity Party', but were again turned down on 22 February 1960.
