= Contact granuloma =

- Other names: Contact ulcer, Vocal fold contact ulcer or Vocal process granuloma
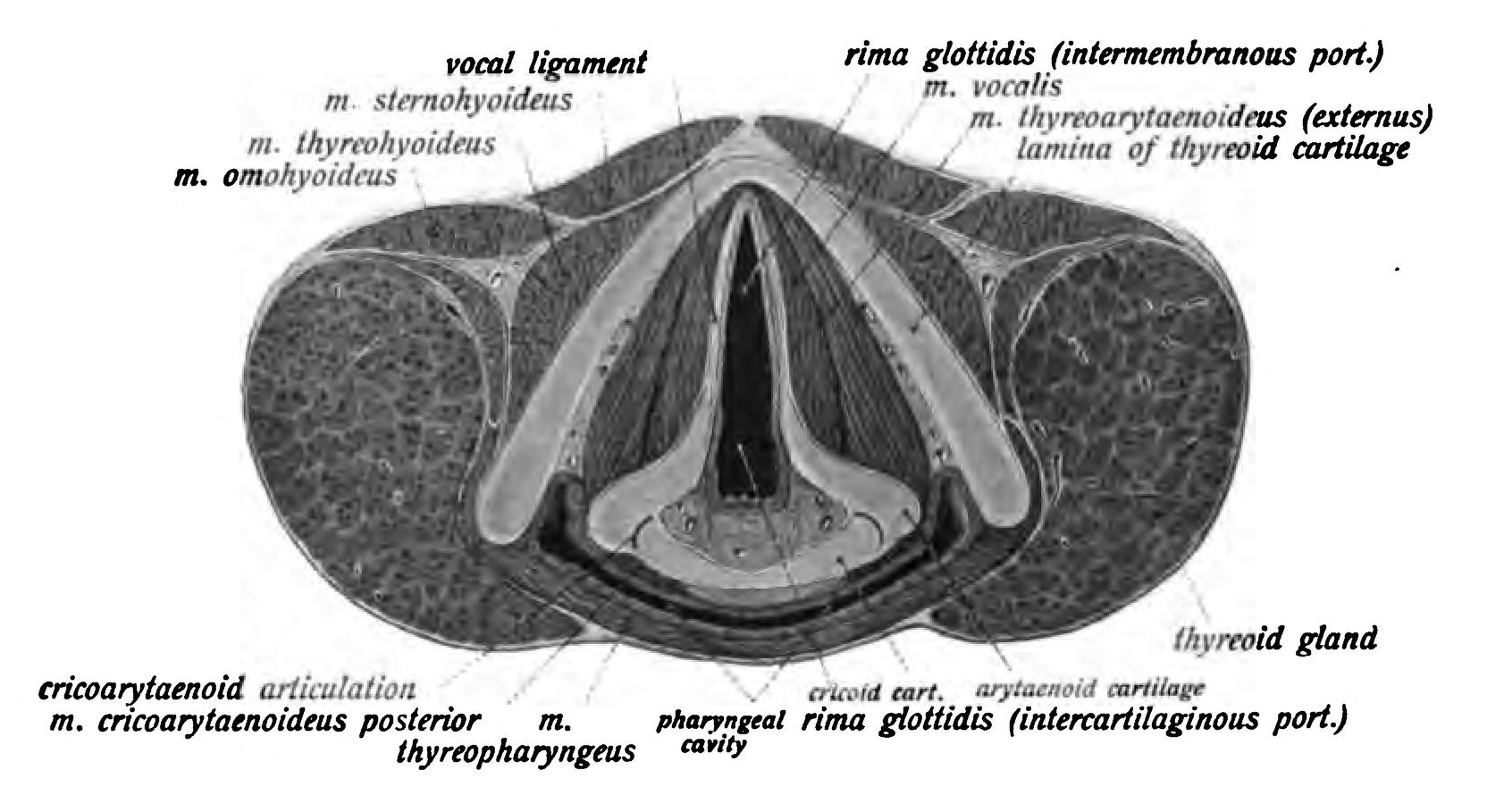
- Healthy vocal folds. Contact granulomas may form in the posterior part of the larynx.
- Specialty: Otolaryngologist

Contact granuloma is a condition that develops due to persistent tissue irritation in the posterior larynx. Benign granulomas, not to be confused with other types of granulomas, occur on the vocal process of the vocal folds, where the vocal ligament attaches. Signs and symptoms may include hoarseness of the voice, or a sensation of having a lump in the throat, but contact granulomas may also be without symptoms. There are two common causes associated with contact granulomas; the first common cause is sustained periods of increased pressure on the vocal folds, and is commonly seen in people who use their voice excessively, such as singers (John Mayer, for example). Treatment typically includes voice therapy and changes to lifestyle factors. The second common cause of granulomas is gastroesophageal reflux and is controlled primarily through the use of anti-reflux medication. Other associated causes are discussed below.

== Signs and symptoms ==
The primary symptoms of contact granuloma include chronic or acute hoarseness of the voice and vocal fatigue. More severe granulomas may result in throat ache or soreness, as well as pain that spreads to one or both ears. Smaller granulomas may result in a tickling sensation or slight discomfort.

Signs of contact granulomas are frequent coughing and throat-clearing. Some people may also notice that their pitch range is restricted due to granuloma.

== Causes ==
The major etiologic factors of contact granulomas have been organized into the following categories:

=== Mechanical issues ===
Mechanical issues resulting in contact granulomas are related to physical trauma at the level of the vocal folds. Trauma occurs when adductive forces are excessive, meaning that a person's vocal folds are closing abruptly and forcefully while speaking or engaging in other non-vocal behaviors (such as throat-clearing and coughing). In addition, the presence of the contact granuloma makes it impossible for the vocal folds to come to a complete closure in adduction. This causes the person to use more force when speaking in an attempt to close the vocal folds completely, which in turn creates more trauma to the vocal folds.

Glottal insufficiency (when the vocal folds cannot close completely, often due to vocal fold paralysis) can also be an underlying cause of contact granulomas.

Contact trauma can occur when a person frequently speaks at a pitch that is lower than their modal voice, especially in vocally-demanding professions like acting, teaching and singing. Research suggests that men are more commonly affected than women.

=== Inflammatory issues ===
Inflammatory issues associated with contact granuloma include gastroesophageal reflux, allergy or infection. There is some disagreement among researchers as to whether inflammatory issues are a direct cause.

=== Intubation ===
For patients in need of tracheal intubation to receive oral drugs, an oversized tube, excessive movement of the tube, or infection can lead to contact granulomas, but this is rare.

=== Psychosocial factors ===
People with certain personality traits and vocal patterns may be more susceptible to the development of contact granulomas. Tenseness, high-stress, aggressiveness and impulsiveness are personality traits associated with contact granuloma.

== Diagnosis ==
Diagnosis of contact ulcers normally involves an endoscopy examination, and a biopsy sample is taken so that the ulcer can be examined for cancerous cells.

=== Physical characteristics ===
Contact granulomas can be physically identified and diagnosed by observing the presence of proliferative tissue originating from the vocal process of the arytenoid cartilage. Identification is carried out by laryngoscopy, which produces an image of the lesion in the form of an abnormal growth (nodule or polyp) or ulceration. The vocal process is overwhelmingly the most common laryngeal site for these lesions, although they have also been observed on the medial and anterior portions of the vocal folds. In nodule or polyp form, contact granulomas generally have a grey or dark red colouring and measure 2 to 15 mm in size. Contact granulomas can occur unilaterally or bilaterally, affecting one or both vocal folds.

=== Differential diagnosis ===
Various methods are used to diagnose contact granuloma which aid in differentiating it from other vocal fold pathology. Laryngoscopy can allow visualization of the suspected granuloma while also checking for signs of vocal abuse. Laryngoscopy, as well as an acoustic analysis of the voice, can help rule out vocal fold paresis as an underlying cause. Microscopic examination of the tissue can help determine that the lesion is benign rather than cancerous, as would be the case in contact granuloma. Other methods such as laryngeal electromyography and reflux testing can also be used to evaluate the function of the vocal folds and determine if laryngopharyngeal reflux is contributing to the pathology.

== Screening ==
Screening tools for contact granulomas are not currently available. Diagnosis of contact granulomas require visualization using laryngoscopy, and may require further biopsy for differential diagnosis. A combination of symptoms and lifestyle factors may be linked with the development of a contact granuloma, however symptoms vary greatly by individual. Some lifestyle factors that have been linked with elevated risk of development of contact granulomas include frequent use of the voice, especially when in loud environments, and concurrent use of the voice with alcohol consumption (increasing risk of gastroesophageal reflux symptoms). Contact granuloma may also arise after intubation, and so following intubation, patients should be monitored if voice symptoms arise. Symptoms may or may not include hoarse voice, described as "huskiness" by some patients, "aching" in the throat related to increased effort to produce voice, and the feeling of having a lump in one's throat when swallowing. It is also possible to have no such symptoms, especially if the granuloma is small.

== Prevention ==
The causes of vocal process granulomas are quite varied, and as such prevention must target the individual causes. Education on lifestyle factors such as habitual vocal abuse and habits that may aggravate gastro-esophageal reflux should be implemented to lower risk, and those who use their voice professionally should use vocal hygiene techniques to ensure safe voice use. Vocal hygiene may include increasing water intake, eliminating external irritants such as smoking or airborne chemicals, controlling loudness, and balancing periods of increased vocal use with periods of rest. Since intubation can also cause vocal process granulomas, proper muscle relaxing medications should be used before insertion and removal of tubes, that smaller tubes are used and with proper lubrication, and that patient movement is controlled during intubation.

== Treatment ==
Specific treatment for contact granuloma depends on the underlying cause of the condition, but often initially includes a combination of speech therapy, vocal rest, and antireflux medication. A more aggressive treatment approach could include steroids (inhalant or injection), injections of botulinum toxin, low dose radiotherapy, vocal fold augmentation, or microlaryngeal surgery). Microlaryngeal surgery can be performed either via cold steel excision or various types of laser. The laser is more accurate and typically results in less damage to the surrounding tissue. These more aggressive approaches might be used in the case of the refractory (i.e. resistant to treatment) contact granuloma where previous interventions have not succeeded or recurrence rates are high. The best outcomes appear to occur when a combination of treatments is used.

=== Steroids ===
The application of corticosteroids to treat contact granulomas is considered a more extreme approach and its utility remains in contention. When employed, it is usually used in conjunction with antibiotics for the reduction of pain and inflammation related to the granuloma. This treatment can be administered orally, through inhalation, or through intralesion injection.

=== Botox injection ===
The injection of botulinum neurotoxin A, or Botox, to treat contact granulomas is considered a more extreme approach, and is generally only pursued when the case has been resistant to other treatments. In this approach, Botox is injected into the thyroarytenoid muscle (unilaterally or bilaterally), targeting a reduction in the contact forces of the arytenoids.

Surgery

When all other medical and behavioural treatments have been attempted, surgical removal of the contact granuloma is possible as a last resort option. However, caution needs to be exercised, especially in the cases of contact granuloma resulting from external factors (i.e., when factors are eliminated, the contact granuloma resolves independently), because any irritation can cause the contact granulomas to reappear.

== Prognosis ==
As the masses of granular tissue are most often benign, prognosis is generally positive. However, due to the variety of treatment options and lifestyle factors, outcomes of individual treatments and form of management vary. A high proportion of contact granulomas are present in patients with concurrent gastroesophageal reflux, and so treatment of the reflux is imperative. Those caused by intubation trauma are less likely to recur. The most common treatment is voice therapy by a speech-language pathologist, and this therapy is enough for many patients. Surgical solutions are sometimes used, however rates of recurrence are higher. Most recent research suggests that surgical options should only be explored once treatment of reflux with or without voice therapy has been introduced.

== Epidemiology ==
Across all posited etiologies, contact granulomas are more commonly observed in male patients than in female patients, and more commonly in adult patients than in pediatric patients. In cases where gastroesophageal reflux disease is identified as the most likely cause of the granuloma, the patient is most commonly an adult man in his 30s or 40s. When contact granulomas do occur in female and pediatric patients, they usually occur post-intubation. There are no observable age or gender trends within the category of post-intubation patients with contact granulomas, nor within the causation category of vocal abuse history.

== Terminology ==
Several different terms are used to refer to contact granulomas (contact ulcer, vocal fold granuloma, vocal process granuloma, etc.). The term contact ulcer was first used in the early 20th century at which time the single cause of this condition was believed to be excessive force when the vocal folds make contact during phonation or non-phonatory behaviors (i.e. coughing). Later, the same condition was observed in patients recovering from recent intubation and, more recently, came to be associated with inflammation and irritation resulting from gastro-esophageal reflux.

Likewise, use of both ulcer and granuloma reflect the fact that this condition can present as an ulcerated lesion or as granulated tissue.

In medical literature today, the term vocal process granuloma is preferred over the term contact ulcer or contact granuloma; this reflects the fact that this condition can result from a variety of different causes and not just excessively forceful contact of the vocal folds as was originally believed. Nevertheless, the term contact granuloma remains widely used.

== Sources ==
- Excerpt from Contact Granulomas - eMedicine
- Vocal Cord Contact Ulcers - The Merck Manuals Online Medical Library
