= Cordectomy =

Surgical removal of the vocal cords

Cordectomy is the surgical removal of a cord. It usually refers to removal of one or both vocal cords, often for the purpose of treating laryngeal cancer. The word is derived from the Greek, combining chorde and ektome meaning excision. It can be carried out by traditional surgical techniques or, increasingly, by carbon dioxide laser. CO_{2} laser cordectomy has allowed the treatment of glottic carcinoma as a day case procedure. The procedure has also been carried out by veterinarians to reduce the volume of incessant barking by dogs, where it is called debarking. In humans, this type of operation is usually done by otolaryngologists.

Prior to surgery, the patient must be informed of serious, debilitating, and permanent consequences of surgery, most notably the loss of speaking capacity with severity correlating to the portion of vocal cords removed. A patient will be incapable of producing most vocal sounds following total cordectomy, although deep guttural screams may still be produced, and with the patient almost always retaining the ability to speak in whispers. There is little to no chance of a patient recovering their voice following a complete or near-complete cordectomy as the procedure literally removes the organs responsible for vocal utterances, and patients with a less-than-entire cordectomy will always lose some or most of their vocal range (again corresponding to the section and amount of removed vocal cords). Doctors are encouraged to explore alternative communication technologies with patients (such as electrolarynxes, whisper-amplifying devices, and text-to-speech software) prior to determining the acceptability of the procedure. Patients should be made to understand that the procedure is absolutely permanent and their vocal capacity (with current technology) will never recover to its range prior to the surgery, and patients with small percentages of cord removals will experience disproportionately severe loss of vocal range compared to the loss suffered by patients who have undergone a near-entire cordectomy procedure.

The indications being Carcinoma of Vocal cords and Early Glottic Carcinoma etc.

According to the European Laryngeal Society, Cordectomy is classified into the following types:

Type I : Subepithelial cordectomy
Type II : Subligamental cordectomy
Type III: Transmuscular cordectomy
Type IV : Total or Complete cordectomy
