= Husain al-Radi =

Iraqi politician and poet (1924–1963)

Secretary of the Iraqi Communist Party
- In office June 1955 – February 1963
- Preceded by: Hamid Uthman
- Succeeded by: Aziz Muhammad

Personal details
- Born: 1924 Kingdom of Iraq
- Died: 24 February 1963 (aged 39) Iraq
- Cause of death: Torture (hanging - as said by the government)
- Party: Iraqi Communist Party
- Spouse: Thamina Naji Youssef
- Children: Iman Al-Musawi, Shatha Al-Musawi, Ali Al-Moussaoui
- Profession: Politician; Teacher

Husain Ar-Radi (Arabic: حسين الرضي;1924, Najaf – 24 February 1963, Baghdad), also known as Hashiim, 'Ammar, and Salam Adil (Arabic: سلام عادل), was an Iraqi communist politician as well as a poet and painter. He was the leader of the Iraqi Communist Party from 1955 until his death by execution or under torture after the Baathist coup in 1963.

== Early life ==
Husain al-Radi was born into a Shia Muslim family of sayyids in southern Iraq in 1924. His father was a junior clerk in a flour mill. Al-Radi trained as a teacher at the Elementary Teachers' College in Baghdad, where he first came into contact with the Communist Party in 1943. After graduating, he was appointed to a school in Diwaniya but was dismissed in 1946 on account of his political activities. He then moved to Baghdad, where he made a living selling grilled meat on the streets.

Muhammad's descendants through Fatimah are known as sharifs, sayeds or sayyids. These are honorific titles in Arabic, sharif meaning 'noble' and sayed or sayyid meaning 'lord' or 'sir'. As Muhammad's only descendants, they are respected by both Sunni and Shi'a, though the Shi'as place much more emphasis and value on their distinction.[156]

== Party activity, 1949-1955 ==
In January 1949, al-Radi was arrested at a demonstration and imprisoned. On his release in 1951, he was appointed comrade in charge of the southern division of the Iraqi Communist Party, and in 1953 he became a member of the party's Central Committee. In that year, he represented Iraq at the second London Conference of Communist Parties in the Sphere of British Imperialism.

That same year, following the arrest of party secretary Baha al-Din Nuri, Abd al-Karim Ahmad al-Daud became party secretary and began to promote a far-left line as well as a considerable level of confrontational activity. Al-Radi opposed this line and in September the party agreed a more moderate policy, but on 16 June 1954 hardliner Hamid Uthman escaped from Kut jail and succeeded in reimposing the far-left line. He was elected party secretary in place of Al-Daud. Uthman accused al-Radi of rightist deviationism and had him expelled from the Central Committee. The latter then moved to the mid-Euphrates region.

== Secretary of the Iraqi Communist Party ==
Al-Radi was recalled by the Central Committee in June 1955, after it removed Uthman from the secretariat. His more moderate line, focused on an alliance with all potential progressive and national forces, seemed more likely to yield results; in any case, the series of confrontations with the police which Uthman had incited had greatly weakened the organisation and were clearly not sustainable. Al-Radi reorganised the Central Committee, and the following year succeeded in reuniting the party, bringing two dissident groups back into the fold.

Al-Radi's moderate approach was similar to that of Khalid Bakdash, secretary of the Syrian Communist Party and elder statesman of Arab communism. During the period 1955–1959, the Iraqi party was closer to Bakdash than at any other point. Al-Radi himself was not by inclination a theoretician, preferring to concentrate on party organisation and action; until 1961, he would be content to leave ideological questions primarily to Amir Abdallah, who was the party's dominant intellectual figure during this period and rather more cautious than al-Radi in his political approach.

== The Qasim regime ==
This divergence of approach between al-Radi and Abdallah first became a serious issue in the aftermath of the 1958 coup that brought Abd al-Karim Qasim to power. The two men agreed on the party's position of support for the new government, which they considered potentially progressive and representative of the progressive national bourgeois elements in Iraqi society. However, Qasim's harsh reaction to the party's demand for a share in government in May 1959 brought about disagreement between them, with Abdallah favouring compromise and al-Radi pushing for a more radical approach.

The party suffered something of a crisis in the summer of 1959, with a minor crackdown by Qasim coinciding with the disturbances of July 1959 in Kirkuk, for which the Communists were widely blamed. A party plenum resulted in a victory for the right wing: it approved a highly self-critical report, published in the party newspaper Ittihad ash-Sha'ab. Al-Radi remained the nominal party leader, but his position as secretary was changed to that of first secretary, with three assistant secretaries appointed who were all close to Abdallah.

In the spring of 1960 the party came under renewed attack from Qasim, with Ittihad ash-Sha'ab banned first intermittently and finally completely. Communist supporters were removed from positions of influence in the government, party-backed organisations which provided a crucial element in its abilities to mobilize the masses were suppressed to a greater or lesser degree and thousands of Communist workers dismissed from their jobs. In November 1961 al-Radi struck back against his opponents in the party, and took full control. The "rightist" line was denounced, Abdallah left for Eastern Europe, and the three assistant secretaries were removed from the Central Committee.

However, with the party increasingly weak, al-Radi himself saw no alternative to a continued policy of critical support for Qasim, despite a renewed wave of repression in May 1962 following Communist-led demonstrations against the Kurdish war. In late 1962, the Kurdish Democratic Party suggested that the Communists collaborate with them in a coup attempt, but the latter rejected the idea. In January 1963, they warned Qasim that plans were afoot for a nationalist coup.

The Baathist coup of 8 February 1963 came as no surprise to the Communists, but they were unable to mobilize their supporters in the armed forces to oppose it effectively. Al-Radi reacted immediately by drawing up an appeal for mass resistance to the coup, and Communist supporters defended poorer districts of Baghdad against the new government until 10 February, suffering heavy losses.

== Capture and death ==
The new regime was quick to act against the Communists, capturing many of them and killing hundreds either in the fighting or in its jails and torture chambers. Al-Radi was captured on 20 February, and executed by hanging soon afterwards, of which the Government officially announced. There is an opinion that he died under torture four days after his arrest without divulging any information.

== Personal life ==
In 1953, Al-Radi married Thamina Naji Yousseff, a communist and feminist activist, and had three children with her: Iman Husain Ahmed Al-musawi, Shatha Husain Ahmed Al-Musawi and Ali Husain Ahmed Al-Moussaoui.

== See also ==
- Iraqi art
- Islamic art
- List of Iraqi artists

== Sources ==
- The Old Social Classes and New Revolutionary Movements of Iraq, Hanna Batatu, London, al-Saqi Books, 2000. ISBN 0-86356-520-4

Preceded by Hamid Uthman	Secretary of the Iraqi Communist Party; 1955–1963	Succeeded by Aziz Muhammad
