= Daud as-Sayegh =

Iraqi communist politician

Daud as-Sayegh was an Iraqi communist politician. As-Sayegh was a Christian lawyer from Mosul. He joined and left the Iraqi Communist Party several times during the 1940s and 1950s.

As-Sayegh had sided with Iraqi Communist Party leader Fahd in the 1942 split in the party. However, in February 1944 as-Sayegh broke away from the party and formed the League of Iraqi Communists. As-Sayegh denounced Fahd's leadership in the Iraqi Communist Party, accusing him of adventurism and undemocratic practices.

As-Sayegh was readmitted to the Iraqi Communist Party in 1957. In early 1958 as-Sayegh, then a Central Committee member of the Iraqi Communist Party, was expelled from the party after disagreements with Salam Adil and Amir Abdullah. In 1959 as-Sayegh founded his own newspaper al-Mabda'. As-Sayegh organized his own Iraqi Communist Party, with a tiny fraction of the membership of the original party. As-Sayegh's party applied for registration as the 'Iraqi Communist Party' in January 1960 as did the original Iraqi Communist Party. As-Sayegh's party was accorded recognition whilst the original party was denied registration. As-Sayegh was a personal friend of Abd al-Karim Qasim and his party received support from the government. As-Sayegh became the subject of virulent attacks in the Iraqi and foreign communist press. The (original) Iraqi Communist Party press stated that as-Sayegh did not represent the working class and that he suffered from megalomania. They stated that as-Sayegh had become a tool of the government in order to weaken the Iraqi Communist Party. As-Sayegh on his part rebuffed these accusations, stating that he represented the original party leadership formed in 1934.

Soon after its foundation, as-Sayegh's party whithered away.
