= Karl Pilß =

Austrian composer and conductor

Karl Pilß (4 April 1902 – 22 June 1979), alternative spelling Pilss, was an Austrian pianist, conductor, and composer. He also was a painter.

Born in Vienna, he studied piano and music theory with Ferdinand Rebay from 1918 to 1922; from 1924 to 1927 composition with Franz Schmidt at the Vienna Academy of Music; from 1925 to 1927 conducting and to become a Kapellmeister with Robert Heger. From 1928 to 1934 he worked as répétiteur at the Wiener Singakademie. In 1932, Clemens Krauss hired him as assistant choir director for Ferdinand Grossmann at the Vienna State Opera.

He also taught piano and music theory at the Wiener Volkskonservatorium that Grossman had established. From 1960 to 1968 he taught at the Vienna Academy of Music. He held various positions such as chorus master of the railroad employees choir, worked privately as a répétiteur from 1941 to 1966. He directed various choirs, including the Wiener Singverein. He was also director of studies at the Salzburg Festival from 1934 to 1966, where he had the opportunity to co-operate in productions with conductors such as Arturo Toscanini, Bruno Walter, Hans Knappertsbusch, Wilhelm Furtwängler, Karl Böhm, and Herbert von Karajan.

As a composer he was influenced by the music of Gustav Mahler, Richard Strauss and his teacher Franz Schmidt. His compositional work includes 85 works for wind instruments, ten orchestral works, 19 Lieder and 34 choral works. His most frequently performed works are the Trumpet Sonata (1935) and the Tre pezzi in forma di Sonata (Three pieces in sonata form) for French horn and piano. His work was also part of the music event in the art competition at the 1936 Summer Olympics.

Already as a young boy Pilß was an ardent painter. His works include many drawings, watercolours and oil paintings as well as drawing in pastels and crayons.
