= Symphony No. 4 (Franz Schmidt) =

Symphony No. 4 is an orchestral composition by Austro-Hungarian cellist and composer Franz Schmidt. It was completed in 1933, and received its premiere in 1934 under the direction of Oswald Kabasta at the Wiener Musikverein concert hall in Vienna. The work was composed following the unexpected death in childbirth of Schmidt's daughter, Emma, and conceptualized by the composer as a requiem in her honor. Symphony No. 4 is often considered the finest work in Schmidt's oeuvre.

== Movements and analysis ==
Symphony No. 4 is in the key of C Major and includes four movements, all performed attacca (without pause). Average performance duration ranges from 41 to 49 minutes.

1. Allegro molto moderato —
2. Adagio —
3. Molto vivace —
4. Tempo primo un poco sostenuto

**The movement titles of Symphony No. 4 are often termed slightly differently, but refer to the same music. The above represents a mix of titling interpretations for the four movements of this work.**

The work begins and ends with solos in the 1st trumpet and features prominent cello solos at the beginning of the Adagio, the first of which begins at the end of the first movement and serves as a bridge into the Adagio. This symphony is contemplative and reflective in nature, and it has been suggested that it represents Schmidt coming to terms with his own death in addition to his daughter's since the composer's physical health was in a period of serious decline around the time of composition. This is further evidenced by the lack of Mahlerian drama characteristic of much post-Romantic Austrian classical music.

== Instrumentation ==
Symphony No. 4 is scored for an orchestra consisting of 2 flutes (2nd doubling piccolo), 2 oboes, cor anglais, 2 clarinets in Bb, clarinet in Eb, 2 bassoons, contrabassoon, 4 French horns, 3 trumpets in C, 3 trombones, tuba, timpani, percussion (3), 2 harps, and strings.

== Performances and recordings ==
This work is not performed often or widely regarded by concertgoers as belonging to the standard repertoire. This may be due to Schmidt's perceived or alleged association with Nazism. (Such associations were strongly denied by two Jewish musicians close to Schmidt: his friend and chamber-music partner, Oskar Adler, and the broadcaster, Hans Keller, who, as a young violinist in Vienna, had benefited from Schmidt's patience and expert guidance.)

However, it has notably been championed by prominent conductors such as Kirill Petrenko, Zubin Mehta, Vassily Sinaisky, Paavo Järvi, Neeme Järvi, Franz Welser-Möst, Simone Young, and Andrew Litton, who have performed and recorded the symphony with the Berlin Philharmonic, Vienna Philharmonic, Malmö Symphony Orchestra, Frankfurt Radio Symphony, Detroit Symphony Orchestra, London Philharmonic Orchestra, Royal Stockholm Philharmonic Orchestra, and Dallas Symphony Orchestra respectively.

In 2000, Martin Sieghart recorded the symphony with the Bruckner Orchestra Linz. Yakov Kreizberg's recording with the Netherlands Philharmonic was released in 2003.

In 2010, Stefan Blunier made a recording with the Beethoven Orchester Bonn, and Vassily Sinasky recorded it with the Malmö Symphony Orchestra.

Paavo Järvi included the work in a 2020 Deutsche Grammophon album featuring all four of Schmidt's symphonies along with the Intermezzo from the opera Notre Dame. The album is titled Franz Schmidt: Complete Symphonies.

Rudolf Moralt's 1962 recording with the Vienna Symphony was released in 2024.

Most recently, Jonathan Berman, conducting the BBC National Orchestra of Wales has been released in 2024.
