= Wiener Singverein =

Concert choir of the Vienna Musikverein

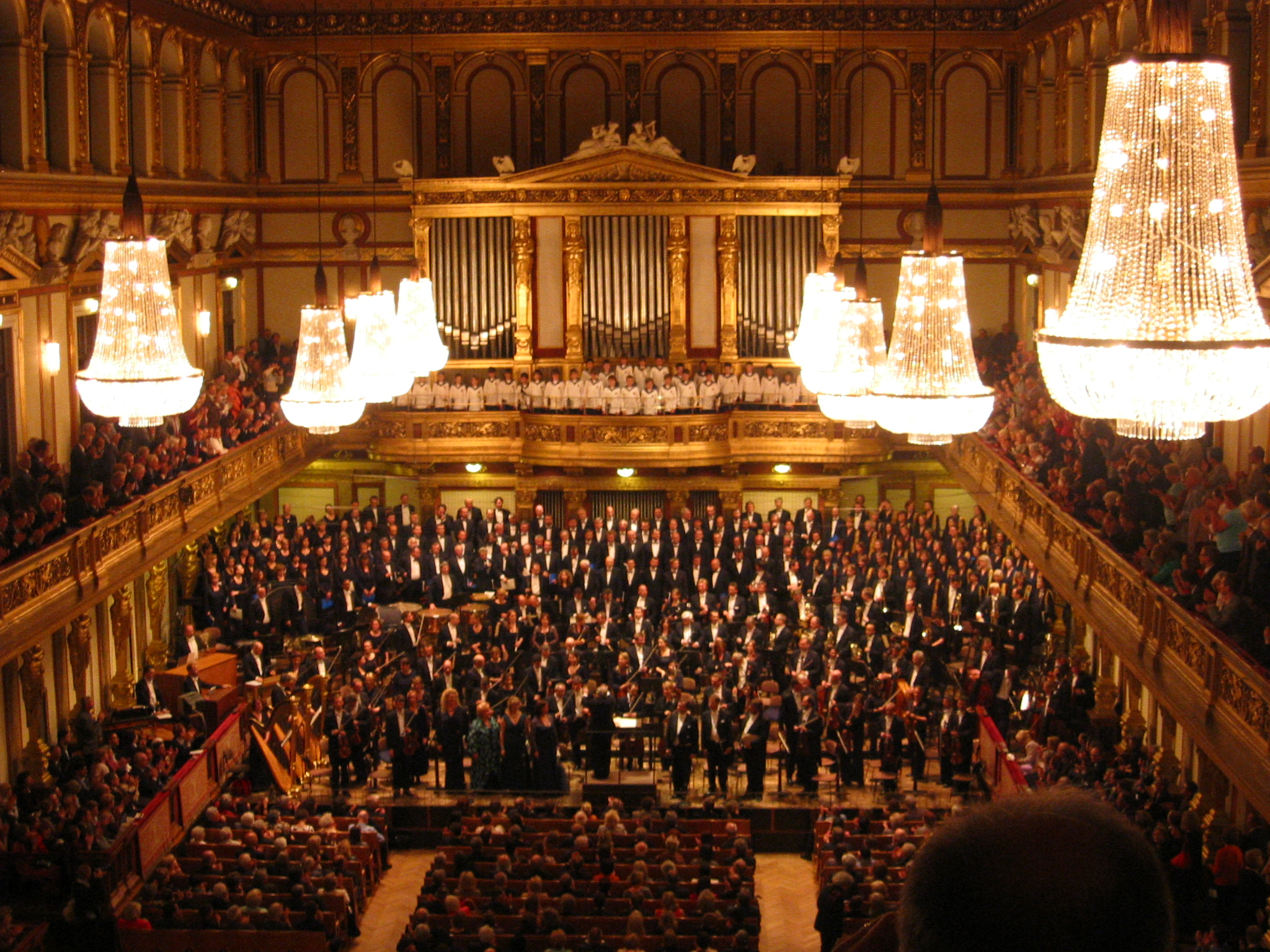
Gustav Mahler: Symphonie No. 8 (2009) – Wiener Singverein – Slovenský filharmonický zbor – Wiener Sängerknaben – Staatskapelle Berlin – Pierre Boulez in Goldener Saal of the Vienna Musikverein

The Vienna Singverein (Singverein der Gesellschaft der Musikfreunde in Wien; sometimes referred to in English as the Choral Society of the Friends of Music, Vienna) is the concert choir of the Vienna Musikverein with around 230 members. It is regularly requested by top orchestras and conductors for large and varied projects.

== History ==
In 1812 the Handel oratorio Alexander's Feast (Timotheus) was performed in the Winter Riding School of the Vienna Imperial Palace, an event which led to the founding of the Society of Music Friends in Vienna (Gesellschaft der Musikfreunde in Wien). The first choral activities of the Musikverein go back to the initiative of Antonio Salieri, for example, taking part in the First Performance of Beethoven's Missa Solemnis and the Symphony No. 9 in 1824.

The choir was founded in its present form in 1858. The first choir master was Johann von Herbeck until his transfer to the Vienna Court Opera. The Singverein has been substantially involved in many first performances from Schubert’s musical play Die Verschworenen (The Conspirators), Johannes Brahms’ A German Requiem, Anton Bruckner’s Te Deum, Gustav Mahler's Symphonie No. 8 and Franz Schmidt’s Das Buch mit sieben Siegeln up to composers of the second post war period, like Gerd Kühr, Christian Muthspiel, Arvo Pärt, Wolfram Wagner and Otto Zykan.

Since its foundation the Singverein has been partner of important conductors, among them Franz Schalk, Wilhelm Furtwängler, Dimitri Mitropoulos, Karl Böhm and Leonard Bernstein. From 1947 to 1989 Herbert von Karajan defined the profile of the choir and made it known worldwide through recordings, concert film productions on laser disc.

Concert tours took the choir to Australia, Japan and the USA; further concerts among others were in Israel, Athens, Berlin, Budapest, Frankfurt, London, Madrid, Moscow, Munich, Paris, Pisa, Rome, and Zurich. In 1959 a performance of the Bruckner Te Deum took place in the Vatican, as well as in 1985 a performance of the Mozart Coronation Mass during the High Mass with Pope John Paul II in St. Peter's Basilica under Karajan.

== Choir masters ==
The first choir master Herbeck was followed by Johannes Brahms, then from mid-twentieth century Ferdinand Grossmann, Reinhold Schmid and Helmut Froschauer. Since 1991 Johannes Prinz has been the choir master engaged by the Vienna Musikverein.

== Conductors and orchestras ==
In recent times the choir has worked, among others, with Daniel Barenboim, Bertrand de Billy, Herbert Blomstedt, Michael Boder, Andrey Boreyko, Pierre Boulez, Semyon Bychkov, Riccardo Chailly, Myung-whun Chung, Christoph von Dohnányi, Gustavo Dudamel, Christoph Eschenbach, Vladimir Fedosejev, Ádám Fischer, Rafael Frühbeck de Burgos, Daniele Gatti, Valery Gergiev, Leopold Hager, Nikolaus Harnoncourt, Martin Haselböck, Kristjan Järvi, Mariss Jansons, Philippe Jordan, Ton Koopman, Emmanuel Krivine, Markus Landerer, Fabio Luisi, Lorin Maazel, Sir Charles Mackerras, Wayne Marshall, Zubin Mehta, Cornelius Meister, Ingo Metzmacher, Riccardo Muti, Andrés Orozco-Estrada, Eiji Oue, Seiji Ozawa, Krzysztof Penderecki, Georges Prêtre, Simon Rattle, Wolfgang Sawallisch, Tugan Sokhiev, Christian Thielemann, Marcello Viotti, Bruno Weil and Franz Welser-Möst.

The Vienna orchestras regularly working with the Singverein are the Vienna Philharmonic, the Vienna Symphony, The Vienna Radio Symphony Orchestra as well as the Lower Austrian Tonkünstler Orchestra. Among the orchestras outside Vienna are the Berlin Philharmonic, the Staatskapelle Berlin, the Bavarian State Orchestra, the Royal Concertgebouw Orchestra Amsterdam, the Leipzig Gewandhaus Orchestra, the Philharmonia Orchestra London, L’Orchestre philharmonique de Radio France and the Orchestre National de France, the Austrian-Hungarian Haydnphilharmonie, the Mozarteum Orchestra Salzburg, the Osaka Philharmonic Orchestra, the Tchaikovsky Symphony Orchestra of Moscow Radio, the Orchestra Giovanile Luigi Cherubini, and the Chamber Orchestra of the Zurich Opera House.

== Jubilee 2008 and news ==
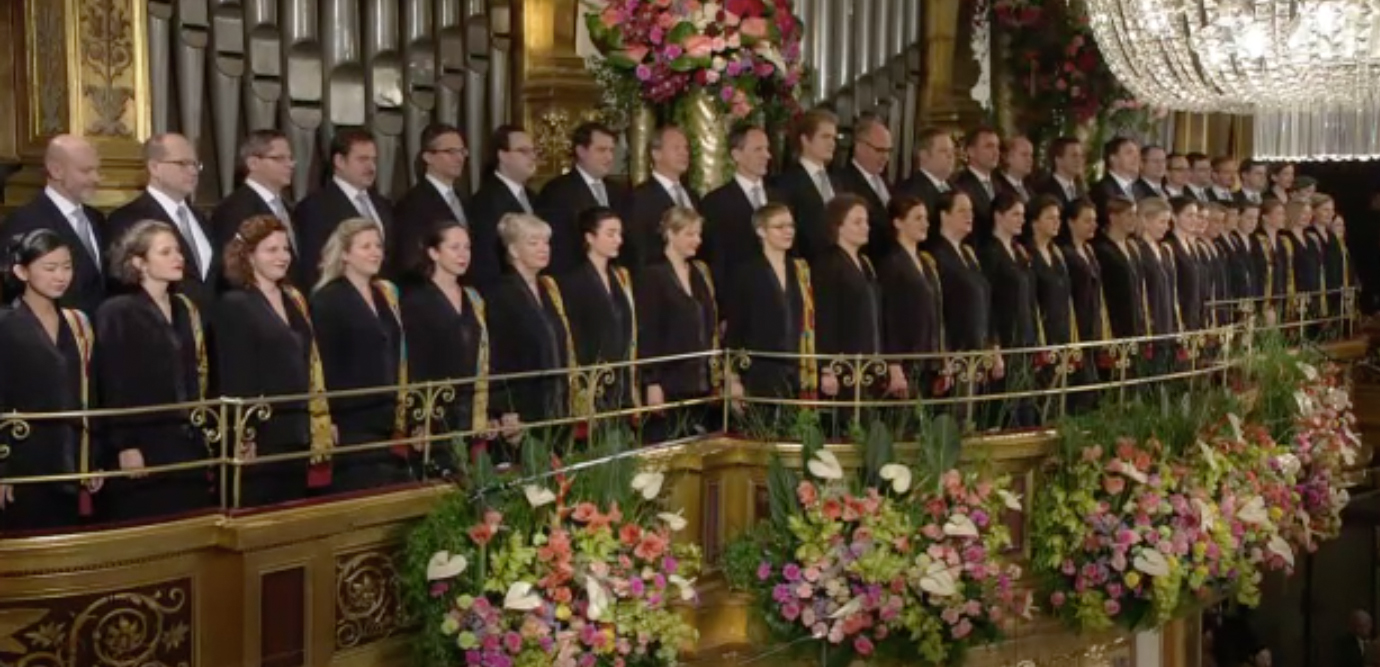
Wiener Singverein at Vienna New Year's Concert 2017

The Jubilee-Season 150 Years Vienna Singverein (2008) was celebrated by a concert tour to Moscow (Gala concert with the Missa Solemnis in the Tchaikovsky Conservatory), a ceremony and a joint concert with the Vienna Singakademie in the Musikverein and in the Konzerthaus singing the Berlioz Requiem. The final Jubilee Concerts took place in Amsterdam with the Koninklijk Concertgebouworkest under Mariss Jansons, four performances of the Requiem op. 89 by Antonín Dvořák. Finally a Leonard-Bernstein-Concert and then a High Mass with Cardinal Christoph Schönborn in St Stephan's Cathedral with a performance of Beethoven's Mass in C.

The Season 2009/2010 began with a concert tour to Japan, where Haydn's The Creation and Brahms’ Requiem were performed in the Izumi-Hall in Osaka. In honour of his 80th birthday, Nikolaus Harnoncourt again conducted the Singverein in a performance of Schmidt's Book with Seven Seals. On the occasion of his 85th birthday, Pierre Boulez conducted concerts with the Vienna Philharmonic and the Singverein; including the Song of the Night (Symphony Nr 3, op. 27) by Karol Szymanowski and Symphonie de psaumes by Stravinsky as well as the Glagolitic Mass (Glagolská mse) by Janáček. Further, for the first time the Singverein was brought in by Christian Thielemann to perform the Ninth Symphony in the complete cycle of the Beethoven symphonies with the Vienna Philharmonic. The Singverein also took part in the Vienna Summer Night’s Concert, which the Philharmonic gave in the park of the Schönbrunn Palace and was broadcast live on Austrian Radio and TV and internationally on 3Sat, singing the Moon Chorus from Otto Nicolai’s Merry Wives of Windsor. After two performances of Arthur Honegger’s Jeanne d’Arc au bucher, in Vienna and In the Linz Bruckner House – with the RSO under Bertrand de Billy, Johanna Wokalek, Peter Matic, Herbert Lippert and the Vienna Boys’ Choir – the Singverein made a guest appearance with this work in the Felsenreitschule at the Salzburg Festival. It was de Billy’s last concert as principal conductor of the RSO, Fanny Ardant played Jeanne. Later in August, the Singverein performed Mendelssohn’s Cantata, The First Walpurgis Night (MWV D3) at the Grafenegg Music Festival.

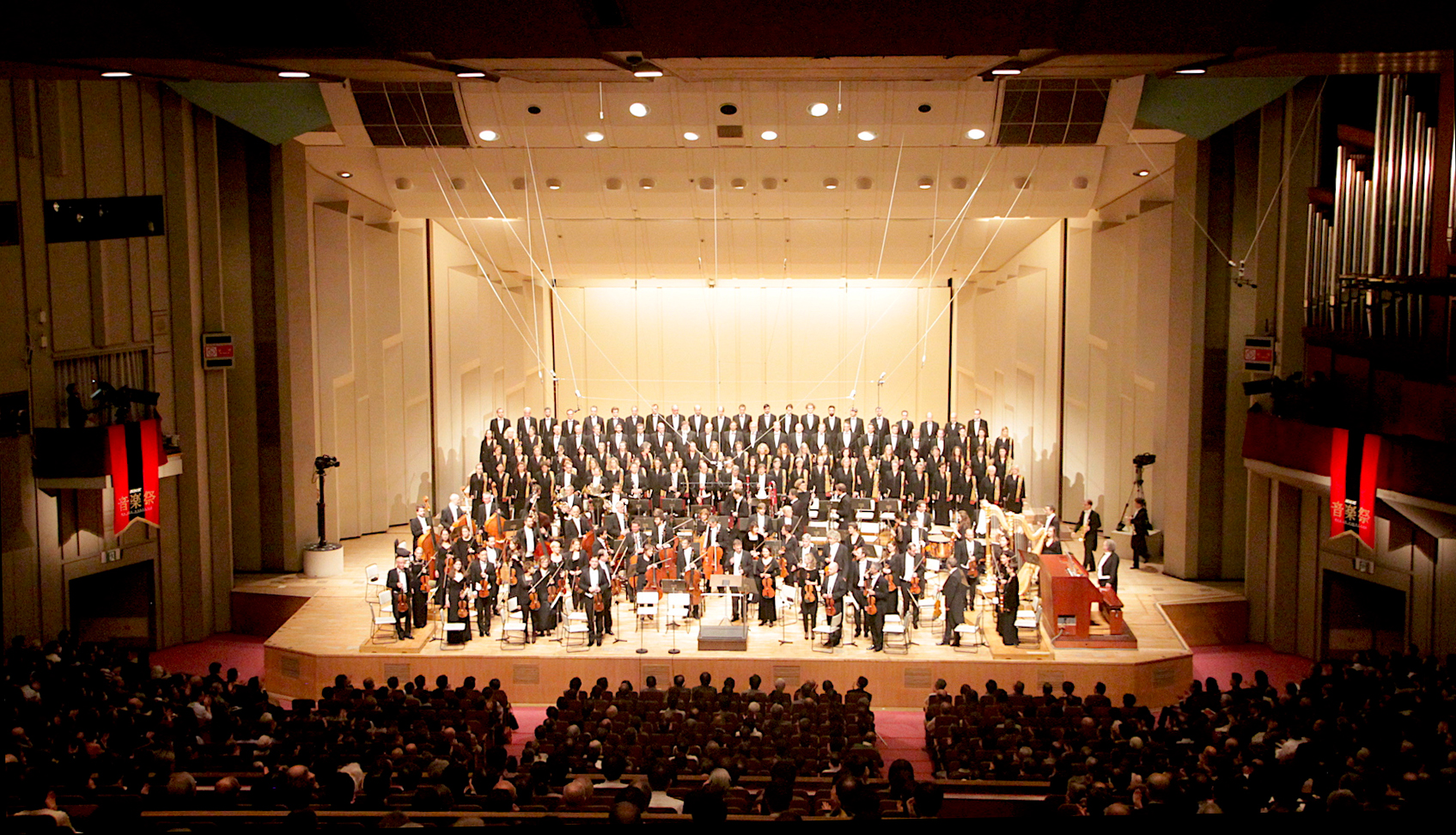
Gewandhausorchester, Wiener Singverein, Herbert Blomstedt, NHK-Hall Tokio 2017

To celebrate the centenary of the first performance Mahler’s Symphony Nr. 8 (Symphony of a Thousand), in which the Singverein took part in September 1910, the choir, along with the Philharmonic Choir Munich and the Tölzer Boys’ Choir, was invited to the Gasteig Philharmonie to give two performances under the direction of Christian Thielemann in October 2010. In the year 2011, concerts with works by Olivier Messiaen, Shostakovich and Mahler under Ingo Metzmacher, Bruckner's E minor Mass and choral works by Peter Planyavsky under Johannes Prinz and for the first time under Cornelius Meister and Gustavo Dudamel, works by Janáček and Mahler took place.

In 2017, the Singverein took part in the famous Vienna New Year's Concert for the first time.

== Recent recordings (CD, DVD, Livestream) ==
- Ludwig van Beethoven Symphonie Nr. 9 – Ode an die Freude (Vienna Philharmonic – Christian Thielemann)
- Johannes Brahms Ein deutsches Requiem (Cleveland Orchestra – F. Welser-Möst)
- Antonín Dvořák Requiem (Royal Concertgebouw Orchestra – Mariss Jansons)
- Gustav Mahler Symphonie Nr. 2 – Auferstehung (Vienna Philharmonic – Gilbert Kaplan)
- Gustav Mahler Symphonie Nr. 2 – Auferstehung (Vienna Philharmonic – Pierre Boulez)
- Gustav Mahler Symphonie Nr. 3 (Bavarian State Orchestra – Zubin Mehta)
- Gustav Mahler Symphonie Nr. 3 (Vienna Philharmonic – Pierre Boulez)
- Otto Nicolai Mondchor aus Die lustigen Weiber von Windsor (Schönbrunn Palace 2010, Vienna Philharmonic – F. Welser-Möst)
- Gioachino Rossini Petite messe solennelle – Musikverein Vienna – May 2013 – (Orchestre National de France – Daniele Gatti)
- Robert Schumann Manfred – Schauspielmusik (Tonkünstler-Orchester Niederösterreich – Bruno Weil)
- Franz Schmidt Das Buch mit sieben Siegeln (Vienna Philharmonic – Nikolaus Harnoncourt)
- Franz Schmidt Das Buch mit sieben Siegeln (Tonkünstler-Orchester Niederösterreich – Kristjan Järvi)
- Karol Szymanowski Symphonie Nr. 3 – Lied der Nacht (Vienna Philharmonic – Pierre Boulez)
- Richard Wagner Tristan und Isolde – Duett-Szenen (Vienna Radio Symphony Orchestra – Bertrand de Billy)

== Literature ==
- August Böhm: Geschichte des Singvereines der Gesellschaft der Musikfreunde in Wien. Wien 1908.
- Gottfried Möser (edit., Text: Desiree Hornek / Chronik: Rudolf Toncourt): Festschrift 125 Jahre Singverein der Gesellschaft der Musikfreunde in Wien (1858–1983). Vienna 1983.
- Gottfried Möser: Der Singverein der Gesellschaft der Musikfreunde in Wien; seine Geschichte mit besonderer Darstellung der Jahre 1933 bis 2000. Vienna 2003.
- Gottfried Möser: Das Chorwesen in Wien in der zweiten Hälfte des 20. Jahrhunderts. Thesis Vienna 2004.
- Joachim Reiber: Wiener Singverein – Menschen Stimmen Götterfunken (2007) *
