= Enid Szánthó =

Hungarian operatic contralto (1907–1997)

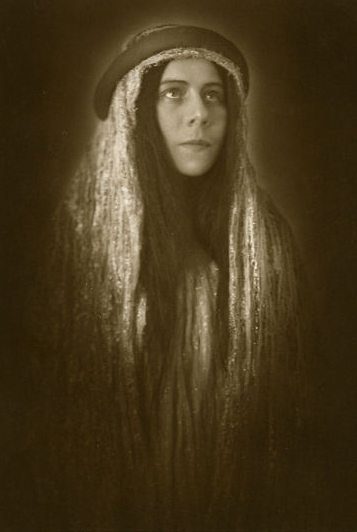
- Enid Szánthó as Erda at the Bayreuth Festival, c. 1930
- Born: 15 March 1907; Budapest, Austria-Hungary
- Died: 1997 (aged 89–90); London, UK
- Education: Königlich-Ungarische Musikakademie Budapest
- Occupations: Operatic contralto; Academic voice teacher
- Organizations: Vienna State Opera; Bayreuth Festival; University of Michigan

Enid Szánthó (15 March 1907 – 1997, buried 21 April 1997) was a Hungarian operatic contralto. From 1928, she belonged to the ensemble of the Vienna State Opera and appeared at the Bayreuth Festival from 1930, first as Erda in Der Ring des Nibelungen. She gave guest performances in opera and concert in Florence, London, Berlin, Paris, and New York at the Metropolitan Opera, where she made her debut as Fricka in 1938. Her career was de facto ended later that year when Austria came under the Nazi regime.

== Life and career ==
Born in Budapest on 15 March 1907, Szánthó was the daughter of a Hungarian ministerial councillor and an Irish mother. She studied singing at the Königlich-Ungarische Musikakademie in Budapest and graduated with a diploma. One of her teachers was Laura Hilgermann. At the age of 21, she was engaged as a member of the ensemble of the Vienna State Opera, where she first appeared as Muschel in the Vienna premiere of Die ägyptische Helena by Richard Strauss. She performed in all evenings of Wagner's Der Ring des Nibelungen in a new production directed by Lothar Wallerstein, as Erda in Das Rheingold in 1928, as Schwertleite in Die Walküre in 1930, as Erda in Siegfried, and as First Norn and Flosshilde in Götterdämmerung, both in 1931.

In 1928, she made her debut at the Salzburg Festival as the Third Boy in Mozart's Die Zauberflöte, staged by Wallerstein and conducted by Franz Schalk. She appeared first at the Bayreuth Festival in 1930 in Ring des Nibelungen as Erda, Waltraute, and Erste Norn, and as an Esquire and a Flower Maiden in Parsifal. She was regularly invited there until 1937.

At the Vienna State Opera, she quickly took on central alto roles in Verdi operas, Azucena in Il trovatore in 1930, Ulrica in un ballo in maschera and Giovanna in Rigoletto, both in 1930. She appeared in the world premiere of Julius Bittner's Das Veilchen on 8 December 1934, directed by Wallerstein and conducted by Krauss, and the male lead role performed by Richard Mayr.

Her international career began in 1935, when she was successful as a concert soloist at the Maggio Musicale Fiorentino and on a concert tour in North America, and subsequently also sang in Berlin and Paris. In 1936, she first appeared at the Royal Opera House in London as Erda and Fricka. She made her debut in the 1937/38 season at the Metropolitan Opera in New York City as Fricka, followed by Brangäne in Tristan und Isolde and Klytämnestra in Elektra by Richard Strauss.

In 1938, came the break in her career. She was no longer invited to Bayreuth, regarded as a Half-Jew, and after the annexation of Austria she also lost her engagement at the Vienna State Opera. Presumably her last performance in Vienna was Azucena in Verdi's Il trovatore on 27 June 1938.

She fled to the United States where she sang some performances at the Metropolitan Opera. In the autumn of 1945, she appeared in four opera and operetta productions of the New York City Opera, as Mary in Wagner's The Flying Dutchman, Czipra in The Gypsy Baron by Johann Strauss, Martha in Gounod's Faust and Ludmilla in Smetana's The Bartered Bride. In 1946, she sang in Paris with the ensemble of the City Opera at the Paris Opéra-Comique, as Mary, but found no permanent place of work. She earned her living as a singing teacher at the University of Michigan and in New York, and she occasionally gave concerts in schools and libraries. After 1946, there are no traces left.

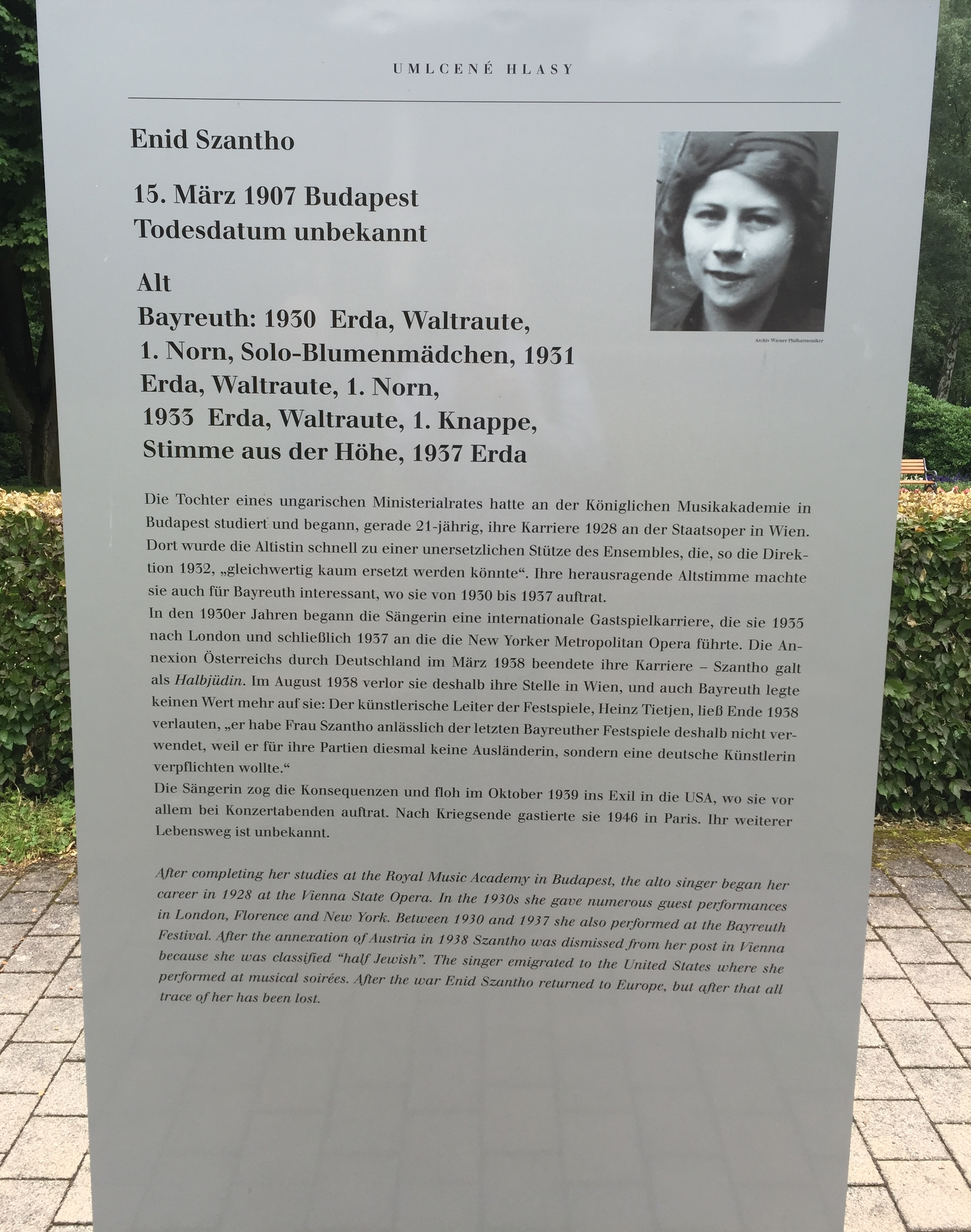
Memorial plaque for Enid Szánthó in Bayreuth

She was buried in London on 21 April 1997.

== Reception ==
Szánthó was regarded as one of the world's best contraltos of her time, especially in the dramatic roles of Strauss, Verdi, and Wagner. Her expressive, dramatic voice was generally praised.

== Repertoire ==
=== Opera ===
Szánthó's operatic roles included:

Giordano:

- Countess di Coigny in Andrea Chénier

Kienzl:

- Magdalena in Der Evangelimann

Korngold:

- Barbara in Violanta
- Brigitta in Die tote Stadt

Puccini:

- Shepherd in Tosca
- Duchess and Teacher in Suor Angelica

Smetana:

- Ludmila /Kathinka in Die verkaufte Braut

Richard Strauss:

- Page of Herodias in Salome
- Klytämnestra in Elektra
- Dryade in Ariadne auf Naxos

Tchaikovsky:

- Olga and Filipjewna in Eugene Onegin
- Polina in The Queen of Spades

Verdi:

- Giovanna in Rigoletto
- Azucena in Il trovatore
- Ulrica in Un ballo in maschera

Wagner:

- Mary in Der fliegende Holländer
- Brangäne in Tristan und Isolde
- Magdalene in Die Meistersinger von Nürnberg
- Erda, Flosshilde and Fricka Das Rheingold
- Fricka and Schwertleite in Die Walküre
- Erda in Siegfried
- Waltraute, Flosshilde and First Norn in Götterdämmerung
- Voice from Above, Esquire and Flower Maiden in Parsifal

Weber:

- Puck in Oberon

=== Concert ===
Szánthó was appreciated as a concert and oratorio singer with an extensive repertoire, ranging from Bach's St Matthew Passion to contemporary music. She performed the alto solo in Mahler's Das Lied von der Erde in Vienna in 1929, conducted by Erwin Stein, and in his Third Symphony, conducted there in 1933 by Eugen Szenkar. She performed in the world premiere of Franz Schmidt's oratorio Das Buch mit sieben Siegeln in Vienna on 15 June 1938, conducted by Oswald Kabasta, with Rudolf Gerlach-Rusnak as Johannes.

Her repertoire in lieder is best documented by performances in the U.S. At a concert at Ann Arbor High School in Michigan in 1941, she sang three songs by Franz Schubert, An die Musik, Liebesbotschaft and the Erlkönig, as well as Mahler's Kindertotenlieder. At another concert there, she performed four lieder by Hugo Wolf and the last two of Wagner's Wesendonck Lieder. At the New York Public Library, she performed works by her compatriot Béla Bartók.

== Recordings ==
Szánthó's voice is documented in several recordings from the Vienna State Opera, for example as Schwertleite in excerpts from Die Walküre on 1 March 1933, conducted by Krauss. On Koch/Schwann, the first scene from Das Rheingold was published, with Luise Helletsgruber, Dora With and Hermann Wiedemann as Alberich. On this label, the singer can also be heard as Erda and as Magdalene in Wagner's Die Meistersinger von Nürnberg. There are private recordings of the singer's voice from the Metropolitan Opera, for example excerpts from Tristan und Isolde with Kirsten Flagstad as Isolde, and on Unique Opera Records her interpretation of Klytämnestra. In 1945/46, Eugene Ormandy conducted Beethoven's Ninth Symphony, with Stella Roman (soprano), Frederick Jagel (tenor) and Nicola Moscona (bass), the Philadelphia Orchestra and the Westminster Choir.
