= The Book with Seven Seals =

German oratorio based on the Book of Revelation

The Book with Seven Seals (Das Buch mit sieben Siegeln)
- Oratorio by Franz Schmidt
- Text: Book of Revelation
- Language: German
- Composed: 1935–37
- Performed: 15 June 1938
- Scoring: St. John (tenor); Voice of God (bass); soprano; alto; tenor; bass; chorus; orchestra; organ

The Book with Seven Seals (Das Buch mit sieben Siegeln) is an oratorio in German by the Austrian composer Franz Schmidt, on themes from the biblical Book of Revelation of Saint John. It was completed in 1937 and first presented in 1938 in Vienna.

The Book of Revelation, the final book of the New Testament, contains a prophetic vision of the end of the present world, the Last Judgement, and the coming of the New Jerusalem. The Book with Seven Seals is opened by the enthroned Lamb of God in the presence of the twenty-four elders. The number seven corresponds to the seven spirits of God, and the sevenfold nature of the divine order in the world. As each of the seals is opened in turn, the events and catastrophes leading to the dissolution of the world are set in motion. (Revelation, Chapters IV - VII)

The oratorio takes the entire sacred narrative of the Book of Revelation as its subject, using selected texts. Through the narrator (tenor), the celestial symbology is introduced as visionary material, while the solo voices, ensembles and choruses enact scenes and responses to events as they unfold. The score employs full orchestral resources including passages for solo pipe organ.

== Textual structure ==
The oratorio is arranged in two main parts, with a prologue in heaven.

=== Prologue in Heaven ===
The principal soloist is Saint John (tenor) who, as narrator, opens with words of devotion to God the eternal, and to Christ the redeemer. The voice of God (bass) announces that He is the Alpha and Omega, and will show what must come. John then paints the vision of the throne in heaven, the rainbow, the 24 elders, the seven spirits, the sea of glass and the four living creatures. In turn the creatures and the elders sing praises. Angels then ask, who is worthy to open the book with seven seals which is in the hand of Him who sits on the Throne. John observes that no-one is found worthy, but then sees the Lamb that was slain, standing before the throne, that redeemed men with its blood, and John leads and the Chorus repeats and develops the phrases as the Lamb takes the book (Chorus: Die Vision des Lammes). John describes how everything falls down and worships, and introduces the chorus of worship to the Lamb. So ends the prologue.

=== Part One ===
The first part concerns the opening of the first six seals, and tells the history of Mankind and The Four Horsemen of the Apocalypse. After a great organ passage the first seal is broken, and John describes the appearance of the white horse and its crowned rider. The rider, whom Schmidt interprets as Jesus Christ, announces the Antichrist. He rides as a warrior in righteousness, with his heavenly hosts, to fight in the Name of God. John tells how the Lamb opens the second seal, and the fire-red horse and rider (War) emerges, followed by his hellish hosts, who shall drive all peace from the world, so that men shall all be driven into war against one another. He is given a great sword. Choruses of warriors extolling death and plunder demand that children be torn from their mothers' love and protection, as the women's choruses seek to protect them and cry out their sorrow and torment. (Chorus: Der Krieg)

The third and fourth riders signify what follows upon the world plunged into war. John tells of the third seal, and of the black horse and its rider, with scales in his hand. The rider announces a small portion of wheat and barley for all, and the mother and daughter sing a piteous lament (Duoszene: Mutter und Tochter) to the father in heaven as they starve from famine. John then describes the pale horse and rider, and the kingdom of death and pestilence which follows him. Tenor and bass soloist, survivors on the corpse-field (Duoszene: Ueberlebenden auf dem Leichenfelde) sing of the death unleashed upon all mankind, but for a small remnant 'He that shall endure to the end shall be saved.'

The fifth seal is broken, and John reveals the choir of souls of the Christian martyrs beneath the altar, which cry out for vengeance upon the earth (Chorus: Der Aufruhr im Himmel). The voice of God bids them wait a little while until their brothers and fellow warriors shall join them. John tells of the sixth seal's opening, and behold, a great earthquake, deluge, and world-burning: the first part of the oratorio ends in a violently-agitated chorus (Der Weltuntergang), cut through by angular trumpet-figures, as the Moon goes red with blood, everything crashes in storms, the stars fall to earth, the sea overflows, the sun goes black, and all mankind comes together before the face of the God of Gods in the Day of Anger.

=== Part Two ===
The second part opens in a climactic organ passage introducing a long narrative for John with orchestra. At the opening of the seventh seal, he describes a great silence in heaven. The ensuing narrative is an allegory for the history of the true believers and their Church, from the birth of Jesus Christ, of their struggle against the followers of the Devil and his false teachers, and of the ultimate victory of the righteous. John describes signs in the heavens, the appearance of a woman, sun and moon at her feet and crowned with twelve stars around her head, and also of a great dragon with seven crowned heads. The dragon's tail strikes the stars down to earth. The woman bears a child, a son, who is drawn up to the throne of God. The woman flees to a wilderness where a place is appointed for her. Then there is war in heaven, and Michael and his angels fight with the dragon (signifying Satan) and his angels, and the dragon is cast down onto the earth, and has no more place in heaven. And the dragon, seeing this, pursued the woman, and made war on those who kept God's word and bore the sign of Christ. He sees the heaven open, and the King of Kings ride out on the white horse, and all the dragon's followers were slain. An angel came down from heaven, and bound the dragon for a thousand years, and cast him into the eternal pit and closed it up so that he should never more trouble the people of the earth.

John's narration returns to the stillness of heaven, the end of all earthly time, and tells that seven angels appear and are given trumpets. Each sounding signifies great sorrows upon the world and its people. The soloists announce the woes, building from alto through to quartet: a rain of blood and fire (punishment for the sins of mankind, responds the chorus); a glowing mountain appears in the sea, and all ships founder, and all lives are lost in the sea and the water is turned to blood (Response: Great God, your judgements are righteous); the star named Wormwood falls to earth, and poisons all waters, and whoever drinks it, dies (Response: Lord, your punishment is truly righteous); Woe to you, sun moon and stars are lost!, sings the quartet of solo voices. The fifth and sixth blasts and their woes are given entirely to the chorus: the plague of hosts devouring the people, and the armies of riders seeking out and slaying people.

Then sounds the seventh trumpet, which announces the fulfilment of God's plans foretold by the prophets. The chorus sings that God rules the world and mankind praises God, in the summons to the Last Judgement (Chorus and Quadruple Fugue: Der Appell zum Jüngsten Gericht). John then narrates that earth and heaven disappear before the face of Him that sits on the throne, and the sea and hell give up their dead, and all the dead stand before the throne, and another book, the Book of Life, is opened. Those whose names are not found written there, shall be thrown into the sea of fire. John sees a new heaven and a new earth, and all those whose names are written in the Book of Life go there to have eternal life. The voice of God speaks, saying that He is the Alpha and the Omega and will give to them that thirst the water of life, and they will become His people, and He will wipe away their tears, and there shall be no more death nor sorrow. Behold, He makes all things new. Whoever shall overcome shall be taken up as an Heir (soll es zum Erbe empfangen), and He shall be his God, and he will become His son.

Then follows an ecstatic Hallelujah chorus (Chorus: Hallelujah), in which the choir sings praises to God, followed by a subdued male chorus of thanksgiving on three notes, in the manner of plainchant. Introduced by a light fanfare as at the opening, the chorus sings 'Amen'!

== Orchestration ==
The oratorio is scored for Heldentenor solo, soprano, alto, tenor, and bass solos, mixed choir, and an orchestra of piccolo, 2 flutes, 2 oboes, cor anglais, 3 clarinets (doubling E-flat clarinet and bass clarinet), 2 bassoons, contrabassoon, 4 horns, 3 trumpets, 3 trombones, tuba, timpani, percussion, organ, and strings.

== History ==
Schmidt completed writing the full score of his oratorio at his home in Perchtoldsdorf on 23 February 1937, and wrote the date at the end. By his own account the preparation of the full score had occupied him for two years, 1935-1937. He completed the Prologue on 15 October 1935, and worked through the first half of 1936 to complete Part One. At this point his hand had become extremely painful, and he stopped writing in the hope of an improvement through a period of hospital rest. By the turn of the year 1936/37 the score reached as far as the sounding of the Seventh Trumpet. A period of intense effort saw the work to completion over the next two months. It then had to wait a little more than a year for its premiere.

It had taken the composer many more years than this, to bring the musical and textual ideas together in their final form. Some parts of the work, such as the Hallelujah, and the closing address of God, are already foreshadowed in the four Preludes and Fugues for the organ (of 1928). However, the only sketches for the oratorio which survive consist of a rough outline of Part Two, on two notebook-leaves. This contrasts with the sketches for other of his works which have been found, including two whole sketchbooks for his opera Notre Dame. But within the score itself one can follow the thread of continual alterations by which he brought the work to its finished state.

Schmidt deliberated over the choice of biblical material for inclusion in an oratorio. He considered choosing from the Letters of Saint Paul, and also thought of setting the Song of Solomon. It is not certain who drew his attention to the Apocalypse, but the names of Oswald Kabasta and Raimund Weissensteiner are mentioned in connection with it. Having settled on the Book of Revelation, he consulted various translations in addition to his own house Bible (the Martin Luther version) in order to arrive at a beautiful and clear text. In his notes for the first performance he wrote that he had resolved not to amend the chosen texts, but to keep to the originals. The full score shows the occasional alteration of a word for its resonance, as for example substituting "throne" for "seat".

The oratorio includes some freely-constructed original texts which do not come from the Bible, but it is not known who wrote them.

The premiere was held in Vienna on 15 June 1938, with the Vienna Symphony Orchestra and the Vienna Singverein (Singverein der Gesellschaft der Musikfreunde) under Oswald Kabasta, with Franz Schütz at the organ. Rudolf Gerlach-Rusnak sang the Evangelist's recitative role, and the other vocal soloists were Erika Rokyta, Enid Szánthó, Anton Dermota and Josef von Manowarda.

The UK premiere was given on 24 May 1966, conducted by Bryan Fairfax.

== Recordings ==
- Anton Dermota (Evangelist), Walter Berry (God), Hilde Güden, Ira Malaniuk, Fritz Wunderlich (soloists): Wiener Singverein, Wiener Philharmoniker, cond. Dimitri Mitropoulos, Alois Forrer (organ). Salzburg Festival, 23 August 1959. Sony SM2K 68442 (2CD).
- Julius Patzak (Evangelist), Otto Wiener (God), Hanny Steffek, Hertha Töpper, Erich Majkut, Frederick Guthrie (soloists): Grazer Domchor, Münchner Philharmoniker, cond. Anton Lippe, Franz Illenburger (organ). Recorded in Stephaniesaal at Graz, January 1962. Amadeo 2 LP AVRS 5004/5005 St, 2 CD Amadeo 423 993-2.
- Peter Schreier (Evangelist), Robert Holl (God), Sylvia Greenberg, Carolyn Watkinson, Thomas Moser, Kurt Rydl, Vienna State Opera Chorus, Austrian Radio Symphony Orchestra, cond. Lothar Zagrosek. Orpheus Digital C 143862H (2CD).
- Eberhard Büchner (Evangelist), Robert Holl (God), Gabriele Fontana, Margareta Hintermeier, Kurt Azesberger, Robert Holzer, Wiener Singverein, Wiener Symphoniker, Horst Stein (cond.). 2 CD, Profil: Günter Hänssler (1997)
- Stig Fogh Andersen, Rene Pape, Christiana Oelze, Cornelia Kallisch, Lothar Odinius, Alfred Reiter, soloists: Bavarian Radio Symphony Orchestra, cond. Franz Welser-Möst. EMI Classics 2-CD
- Kurt Streit, Franz Hawlata, Dorothea Röschmann, Marjana Lipovsek, Herbert Lippert: Wiener Singverein, Wiener Philharmoniker, cond. Nikolaus Harnoncourt. 2 CD, Teldec (2000)
- Johannes Chum (Evangelist), Robert Holl, Sandra Trattnigg, Michelle Breedt, Nikolai Schukoff, Manfred Hemm, Wiener Singverein Tonkünstler-Orchester, cond. Kristjan Järvi. CD, Chandos (2008)
- Herbert Lippert, Noriko Masuda, Etsuko Kanoh, Hiroyuki Yoshida, Kurt Rydl, Ritsuyukai Choir, New Japan Philharmonic, cond. Christian Arming. 2 CD, Fontec (2009)
- Klaus Florian Vogt, Georg Zeppenfeld, Inga Kalna, Bettina Ranch, Dovlet Nurgeldiyev, Volker Krafft, NDR Chor, Staatschor Latvija, Hamburger Philharmoniker, cond. Simone Young. Oehms Classics (2016)
- Anton Dermota, Robert Holl, Margarita Kyriaki, Hertha Töpper, Thomas Moser, Artur Korn (soloists); Grazer Concertchor, Niederösterreichisches Tonkünstlerorchester, cond. Alois J. Hochstrasser; Rudolf Scholz (organ). Preiser Records SQPR 3263/4 (2 LP)

== Sources ==
- Andreas Liess, Franz Schmidt (Verlag Hermann Böhlaus Nachf. G.m.b.H., Graz 1951).
- Carl Nemeth, Franz Schmidt (Amalthea-Verlag, Zurich-Leipzig-Wien 1957).
- Franz Kosch, 'Das Österreichische Oratorium. Zur Musik von Franz Schmidts "Das Buch Mit Sieben Siegeln",' in Österreichische Musikzeitschrift, Jahrgang 8, Wien 1953, pp. 98–104.
- Albert Arbeiter, 'Einführung in "Das Buch mit Sieben Siegeln",' 1958, Styria, Judenburg.
- Franz Schmidt, 'Einige Bemerkungen zum Text des Oratoriums "Das Buch mit Sieben Siegeln".'(Printed in full (German) in insert to Amadeo LP and CD record sets of 1962 recording).
