= Franz Schmidt (composer) =

Austrian composer, cellist and pianist

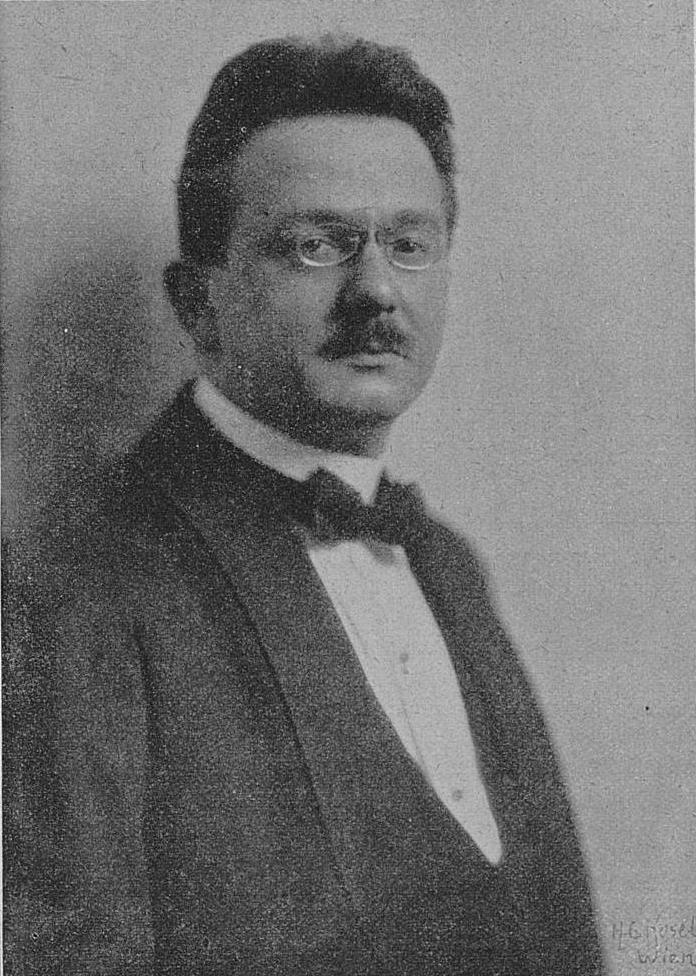
- Born: 22 December 1874; Pressburg, Austria-Hungary
- Died: 11 February 1939 (aged 64); Perchtoldsdorf
- Education: Vienna Conservatory
- Occupations: Composer; Cellist; Academic teacher
- Organization: Vienna Conservatory

Franz Schmidt, also Ferenc Schmidt (Hungarian: [ˈʃmitː ˈfɛrɛnt͡s], 22 December 1874 – 11 February 1939) was an Austro-Hungarian composer, cellist and pianist.

== Life ==
Schmidt was born in Pozsony/Pressburg, in the Hungarian part of Austria-Hungary (today Bratislava, Slovakia) to a half-Hungarian father – with the same name, born in the same city – and to a Hungarian mother, Mária Ravasz. He was a Roman Catholic.

His earliest teacher was his mother, an accomplished pianist, who gave him a systematic instruction in the keyboard works of J. S. Bach. He received a foundation in theory from Felizian Josef Moczik, the organist at the Franciscan church in Pressburg. He studied piano briefly with Theodor Leschetizky, with whom he clashed. He moved to Vienna with his family in 1888, and studied at the Vienna Conservatory (composition with Robert Fuchs, cello with Ferdinand Hellmesberger, and, for a few lessons, counterpoint with Anton Bruckner, who was already seriously ill at that time), graduating "with excellence" in 1896.

He obtained a post as cellist with the Vienna Court Opera Orchestra, where he played until 1914, often under Gustav Mahler. Mahler habitually had Schmidt play all the cello solos, even though Friedrich Buxbaum was the principal cellist. Schmidt was also in demand as a chamber musician. Schmidt and Arnold Schoenberg maintained cordial relations despite their vast differences in eventual outlook and style (Schmidt certainly shows a perceptible influence from Schoenberg's early, tonal works such as Verklärte Nacht, Op. 4, in whose Viennese première he participated as cellist, the Chamber Symphony No. 1, Op. 9 and the gigantic cantata Gurre-Lieder. Unable to procure a teaching position for Schoenberg at the academy, Schmidt rehearsed his students in a performance of Pierrot Lunaire, Op. 21 which Schoenberg warmly praised). Also a brilliant pianist, in 1914 Schmidt took up a professorship in piano at the Vienna Conservatory, which had been recently renamed Imperial Academy of Music and the Performing Arts. (Apparently, when asked who the greatest living pianist was, Leopold Godowsky replied, "The other one is Franz Schmidt.") In 1925 he became Director of the academy, and from 1927 to 1931 its Rector.

As teacher of piano, cello and counterpoint and composition at the academy, Schmidt trained numerous instrumentalists, conductors, and composers who later achieved fame. Among his best-known students were the pianist Friedrich Wührer and Alfred Rosé (son of Arnold Rosé, the founder of the Rosé Quartet, Konzertmeister of the Vienna Philharmonic and brother-in-law of Gustav Mahler). Among the composers were Walter Bricht (his favourite student), Theodor Berger, Marcel Rubin, Alfred Uhl and Ľudovít Rajter. He received many tokens of the high esteem in which he was held, notably the Order of Franz Joseph, and an Honorary Doctorate from the University of Vienna.

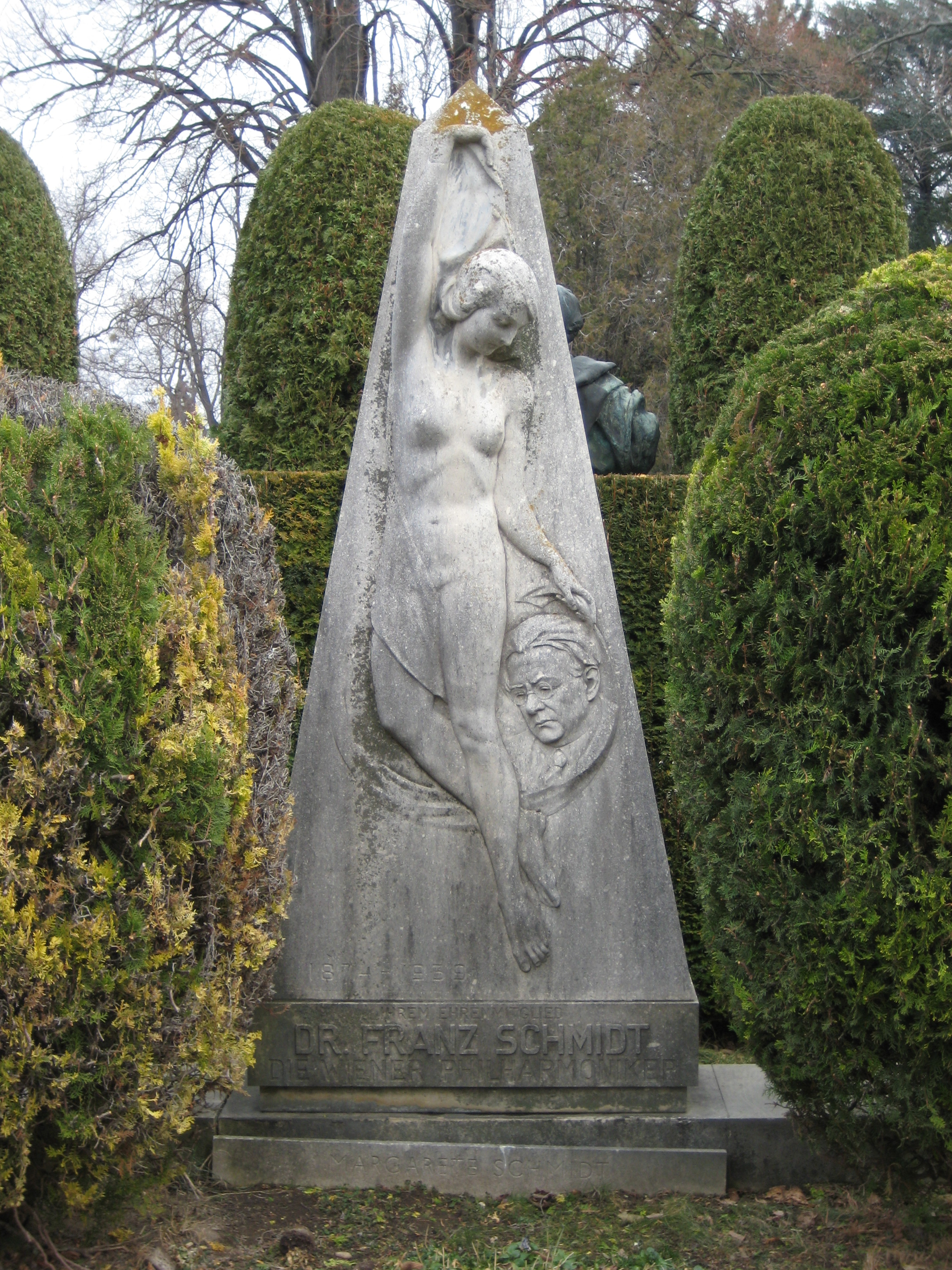
His grave in Vienna's Zentralfriedhof

Schmidt's private life was in stark contrast to the success of his distinguished professional career. His first wife, Karoline Perssin (c. 1880–1943), was confined in the Vienna mental hospital Am Steinhof in 1919, and three years after his death was murdered under the Nazi euthanasia program. Their daughter Emma Schmidt Holzschuh (1902–1932, married 1929) died unexpectedly after the birth of her first child. Schmidt experienced a spiritual and physical breakdown after this, and achieved an artistic revival and resolution in his Fourth Symphony of 1933 (which he inscribed as "Requiem for my Daughter") and, especially, in his oratorio The Book with Seven Seals. His second marriage in 1923, to a successful young piano student Margarethe Jirasek (1891–1964), for the first time brought some desperately needed stability into the private life of the artist, who was plagued by many serious health problems.

Schmidt's worsening health forced his retirement from the academy in early 1937. In the last year of his life Austria was brought into the German Reich by the Anschluss, and Schmidt was feted by the Nazi authorities as the greatest living composer of the so-called Ostmark. He was given a commission to write a cantata entitled The German Resurrection, which, after 1945, was taken by many as a reason to brand him as having been tainted by Nazi sympathy. However, Schmidt left this composition unfinished, and in the summer and autumn of 1938, a few months before his death, set it aside to devote himself to two other commissioned works for the one-armed pianist Paul Wittgenstein: the Quintet in A major for piano left-hand, clarinet, and string trio; and the Toccata in D minor for solo piano. Schmidt died on 11 February 1939.

== Musical works ==
As a composer, Schmidt was slow to develop, but his reputation, at least in Austria, saw a steady growth from the late 1890s until his death in 1939. In his music, Schmidt continued to develop the Viennese classic-romantic traditions he inherited from Schubert, Brahms, and Bruckner. He also takes forward the "gypsy" style of Liszt and Brahms. His works are monumental in form and firmly tonal in language, though quite often innovative in their designs and clearly open to some of the new developments in musical syntax initiated by Mahler and Schoenberg.

Although Schmidt did not write a lot of chamber music, what he did write, in the opinion of such critics as Wilhelm Altmann, was important and of high quality. Although Schmidt's organ works may resemble others of the era in terms of length, complexity, and difficulty, they are forward-looking in being conceived for the smaller, clearer, classical-style instruments of the Orgelbewegung, which he advocated. Schmidt worked mainly in large forms, including four symphonies (1899, 1913, 1928 and 1933) and two operas: Notre Dame (1904–6) and Fredigundis (1916–21). A CD recording of Notre Dame has been available for many years, starring Dame Gwyneth Jones and James King.

=== Fredigundis ===
No really adequate recording has been made of Schmidt's second and last opera Fredigundis, of which there has been but one "unauthorized" release in the early 1980s on the Voce label of an Austrian Radio broadcast of a 1979 Vienna performance under the direction of Ernst Märzendorfer. Aside from numerous "royal fanfares" (Fredigundis held the French throne in the sixth century) the score contains some fine examples of Schmidt's transitional style between his earlier and later manner. In many respects, Schmidt seldom ventured so far from traditional tonality again, and his third and final period (in the last decade-and-a-half of his life) was generally one of (at least partial) retrenchment, consolidation and the integration of the style of his opulently scored and melodious early compositions (the First Symphony, "Notre Dame") with elements of the overt experimentation seen in "Fredigundis", combined with an economy of utterance born of artistic maturity. New Grove encyclopaedia states that Fredigundis was a critical and popular failure, which may be partly attributable to the fact that Fredigundis (Fredegund, the widow of Chilperic I), is presented as a murderous and sadistic feminine monster. Add to this some structural problems with the libretto, and the opera's failure to make headway – despite an admirable and impressive score – becomes comprehensible.

=== The Book with Seven Seals ===
Aside from the mature symphonies (Nos. 2–4), Schmidt's crowning achievement was the oratorio The Book with Seven Seals (1935–37), a setting of passages from the Book of Revelation. His choice of subject was prophetic: with hindsight the work appears to foretell, in the most powerful terms, the disasters that were shortly to be visited upon Europe in the Second World War. Here his invention rises to a sustained pitch of genius. A narrative upon the text of the oratorio was provided by the composer.

Schmidt's oratorio stands in the Austro-German tradition stretching back to the time of J. S. Bach and Handel. He was one of relatively few composers to write an oratorio fully on the subject of the Book of Revelation (earlier works include Georg Philipp Telemann: Der Tag des Gerichts, Schneider: Das Weltgericht, Louis Spohr: Die letzten Dinge, Joachim Raff: Weltende, and Ralph Vaughan Williams: Sancta Civitas). Far from glorifying its subject, it is a mystical contemplation, a horrified warning, and a prayer for salvation. The premiere was held in Vienna on 15 June 1938, with the Vienna Symphony Orchestra under Oswald Kabasta: the soloists were Rudolf Gerlach (John), Erika Rokyta, Enid Szánthó, Anton Dermota, Josef von Manowarda and Franz Schütz at the organ.

=== Symphonies ===
Schmidt is generally regarded as a conservative composer, but the rhythmic subtlety and harmonic complexity of much of his music belie this. His music combines a reverence for the Austro-German lineage of composers with innovations in harmony and orchestration (showing an awareness of the output of composers such as Debussy and Ravel, whose piano music he greatly admired, along with a knowledge of more recent composers in his own German-speaking realm, such as Schoenberg, Berg, Hindemith, etc.).

- Symphony No. 1 in E major
  Written in 1896 at age 22. The scherzo (which shows a mature absorption of Bruckner and Richard Strauss) is especially noteworthy, while Schmidt demonstrates his contrapuntal skills in the Finale.
- Symphony No. 2 in E♭ major
  Written in 1913 in a style reminiscent of Strauss and Reger while also paying homage to the monumentality of Bruckner. This is Schmidt's longest symphony and it employs a huge orchestra. The central movement (of three) is an ingenious set of variations, which are grouped to suggest the characters of slow movement and scherzo. The complex scoring renders it a considerable challenge for most orchestras.
- Symphony No. 3 in A major
  A sunny, melodic work in the Schubert vein (although its lyricism and superb orchestration do much to conceal the fact that it is one of the composer's most harmonically advanced works). Winner of the Austrian section of the 1928 International Columbia Graphophone Competition (the overall winner was Swedish composer Kurt Atterberg with his 6th Symphony), it enjoyed some popularity at the time (1928).
- Symphony No. 4 in C major
  Written in 1933, this is the best-known work of his entire oeuvre. The composer called it "A requiem for my daughter". It begins with a long 23-bar melody on an unaccompanied solo trumpet (which returns at the symphony's close, "transfigured" by all that has intervened). The Adagio is an immense ABA ternary structure. The first A is an expansive threnody on solo cello (Schmidt's own instrument) whose seamless lyricism predates Strauss's Metamorphosen by more than a decade (its theme is later adjusted to form the scherzo of the symphony); the B section is an equally expansive funeral march (unmistakably referencing the Marcia Funebre from Beethoven's Eroica in its texture) whose dramatic climax is marked by an orchestral crescendo culminating in a gong and cymbal crash (again, a clear allusion to similar climaxes in the later symphonies of Bruckner, and followed by what Harold Truscott has described as a "reverse climax", leading back to a repeat of the A section).

== Schmidt and Nazism ==
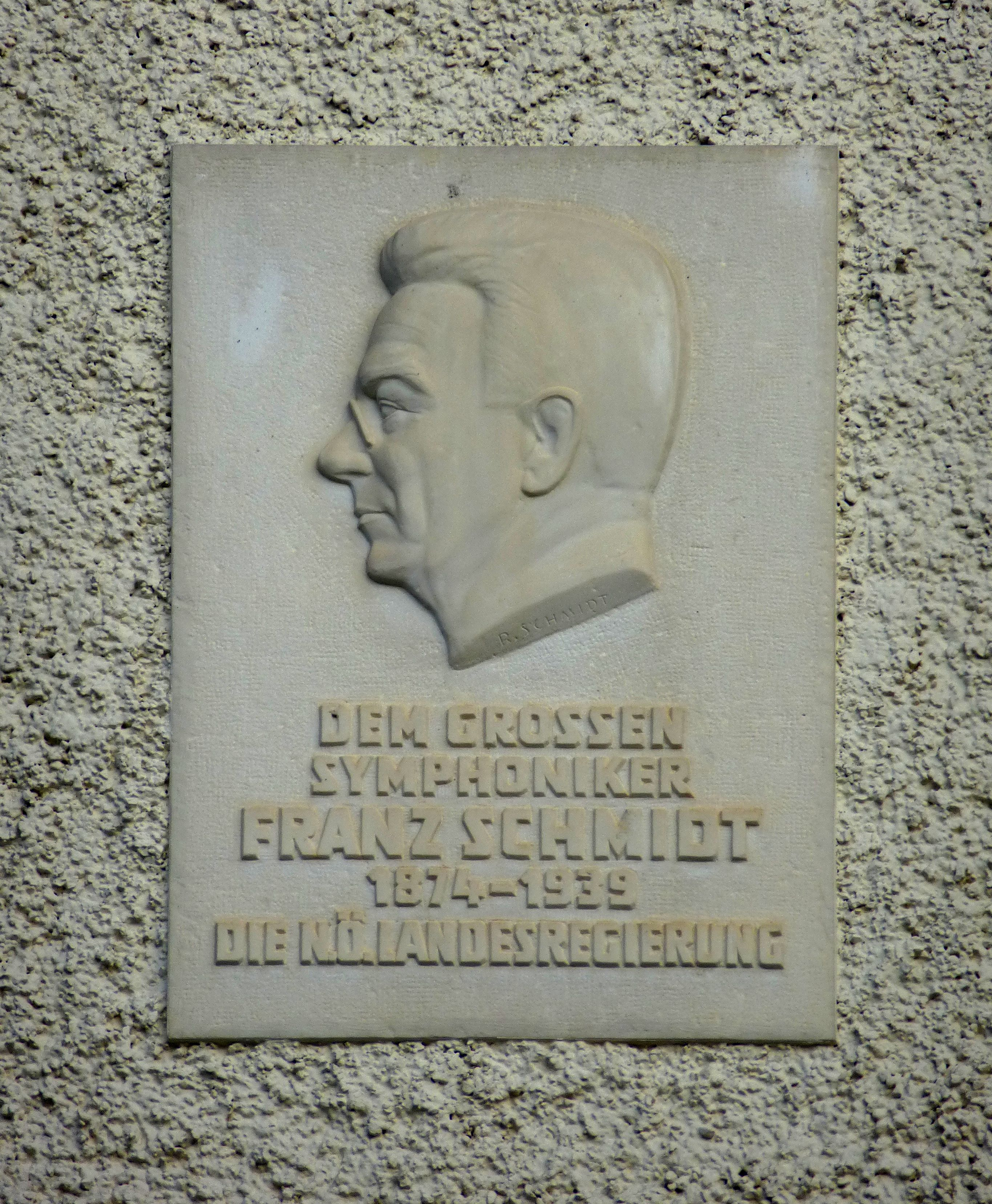
Monument of Schmidt

Schmidt's premiere of The Book with Seven Seals was made much of by the Nazis (who had annexed Austria shortly before in the Anschluss), and Schmidt was seen to give the Nazi salute (according to a report by Georg Tintner, who revered Schmidt and whose intent to record his symphonies was never realised). His conductor Oswald Kabasta was apparently an enthusiastic Nazi who, being prohibited from conducting in 1946 during de-nazification, committed suicide. These facts long placed Schmidt's posthumous reputation under a cloud. His lifelong friend and colleague Oskar Adler, who fled the Nazis in 1938, wrote afterwards that Schmidt was never a Nazi and never antisemitic but was extremely naive about politics. Hans Keller gave a similar endorsement. Regarding Schmidt's political naivety, Michael Steinberg, in his book The Symphony, tells of Schmidt's recommending Variations on a Hebrew Theme by his student Israel Brandmann to a musical group associated with the proto-Nazi German National Party. Most of Schmidt's principal musical friends were Jews, and they benefited from his generosity.

Schmidt's last listed work, the cantata Deutsche Auferstehung (German Resurrection), was composed to a Nazi text. As one of the most famous living Austrian composers, Schmidt was well known to Hitler and received this commission after the Anschluss. He left it unfinished, to be completed later by Robert Wagner. Already seriously ill, Schmidt worked instead on other compositions such as the Quintet in A major for piano (left hand), clarinet and string trio, intended for Paul Wittgenstein and incorporating a variation set based on a theme by Wittgenstein's old teacher, Josef Labor. His failure to complete the cantata is likely to be a further indication that he was not committed to the Nazi cause.

In a 1996 issue of The Musical Quarterly, Peter Laki argued that Schmidt was falsely associated with Nazism, although Leon Botstein disagreed.

== Listing of works ==
=== Operas ===
- Notre Dame, romantic Opera in two acts, text after Victor Hugo by Franz Schmidt and Leopold Wilk; comp. 1902–4, premiered Vienna 1914
- Fredigundis, Opera in three acts, text after Felix Dahn by Bruno Hardt-Warden and Ignaz Michael Welleminsky; comp. 1916–21, premiered Berlin 1922

=== Oratorio ===
- The Book with Seven Seals (Das Buch mit sieben Siegeln) for Soli, Chorus, Organ and Orchestra, Text after the Revelation of St John; comp. 1935–37; premiered Vienna, 1938

=== Cantata ===
- Deutsche Auferstehung a Festival Song for Soli, Chorus, Organ and Orchestra, Text by Oskar Dietrich; comp. 1938–39, unfinished, prepared for performance by Dr. Robert Wagner; premiered Vienna, 1940

=== Symphonies ===
- Symphony No. 1 in E major; comp. 1896–99, premiered Vienna 1902
- Symphony No. 2 in E♭ major; comp. 1911–13, premiered Vienna 1913
- Symphony No. 3 in A major; comp. 1927–28, premiered Vienna 1928
- Symphony No. 4 in C major; comp. 1932–33, premiered Vienna 1934

=== Piano concertos ===
- Concertante Variations on a Theme of Beethoven for Piano (left hand alone) with orchestral accompaniment; comp. 1923, premiered Vienna 1924; Two-handed arrangement by Friedrich Wührer (1952)
- Piano Concerto in E♭ major (for left hand alone); comp. 1934, premiered: Vienna 1935; Two-handed version by Friedrich Wührer (1952)

=== Other orchestral works ===
- Carnival music and Intermezzo from the Opera Notre Dame; comp. 1902–03; premiered Vienna 1903
- Variations on a Hussar Song for orchestra; comp. 1930–31; premiered Vienna 1931
- Chaconne in D minor; transcribed from the Chaconne in C♯ minor for organ from 1925; completed 1931; Manuscript

=== Chamber music ===
- Four Little Fantasy pieces after Hungarian National Melodies, for cello with piano accompaniment; comp. 1892; premiered Vienna 1926 (three pieces)
- String Quartet in A major; comp. 1925; premiered Vienna 1925
- String Quartet in G major; comp. 1929; premiered Vienna 1930
- Quintet for piano left hand, two violins, viola and cello in G major; comp. 1926; premiered Stuttgart 1931; two-handed arrangement by Friedrich Wührer (1954)
- Quintet for clarinet, piano left hand, violin, viola and cello in B♭ major; comp. 1932; premiered Vienna 1933
- Quintet for clarinet, piano left hand, violin, viola and cello in A major; comp. 1938; premiered Vienna 1939; two-handed arrangement by Friedrich Wührer (1952)

=== Music for trumpets ===
- Variations and Fugue on an original Theme in D major (King's Fanfare from Fredigundis); 3. Arrangement for Trumpets alone; comp. 1925, premiered 1925

=== Music for organ and trumpet ===
- Variations and Fugue on an original Theme in D major (King's Fanfare from Fredigundis); 4. Arrangement for 14 Trumpets, Kettledrum and Organ; comp. 1925, premiered Vienna 1925
- Choral overture "God preserve us" for Organ with ad libitum processional Trumpet-chorus; comp. 1933, premiered Vienna 1933
- Solemn Fugue (Fuga solemnis) for Organ with Entrance of 6 Trumpets, 6 Horns, 3 Trombones, Bass Tuba and Kettledrums; comp. 1937, premiered Wien 1939

=== Piano music ===
- Romance in A major
- Christmas pastorale in A major (= Organ work, arrangement)
- Intermezzo in F♯ minor (2nd movement of the A major Quintet)
- Toccata in D minor (for left hand alone); comp. 1938, premiered: Vienna 1940 (two-handed arrangement); two-handed arrangement by Friedrich Wührer (1952)

=== Organ works ===
- Variations on a theme by Christoph Willibald Gluck (lost)
- Variations and Fugue on an original theme in D major (King's Fanfare from Fredigundis), 1. Arrangement; comp. 1916
- Phantasie and Fugue in D major; comp. 1923–24, premiered Vienna 1924
- Variations and Fugue on an original theme in D major (King's Fanfare from Fredigundis), 2. Arrangement; comp. 1924, premiered Vienna 1924
- Toccata in C major; comp. 1924, premiered Vienna 1925
- Prelude and Fugue in E♭ major; comp. 1924, premiered Vienna 1925
- Chaconne in C♯ minor; comp. 1925, premiered Vienna 1925
- Four small Chorale preludes; comp. 1926, premiered Vienna 1926

"O Ewigkeit du Donnerwort" (O Eternity thou Thundrous Word), F major
"Was mein Gott will" (What My God Wills), D major
"O, wie selig seid ihr doch, ihr Frommen" (O How Happy Are Ye Now, You Blessed), D minor
"Nun danket alle Gott" (Now Thank We All Our God), A major

- Fugue in F major; comp. 1927, premiered Vienna 1932
- Prelude and Fugue in C major; comp. 1927, premiered Vienna 1928
- Four little Preludes and Fugues; comp. 1928, premiered Berlin 1929

Prelude and Fugue in E♭ major
Prelude and Fugue in C minor
Prelude and Fugue in G major
Prelude and Fugue in D major

- Chorale Prelude, "Der Heiland ist erstanden"; comp. 1934, premiered Vienna 1934
- Prelude and Fugue in A major, Christmas pastoral; comp. 1934, premiered Vienna 1934
- Toccata and Fugue A♭ major; comp. 1935, premiered Vienna 1936

== See also ==
- List of Austrians in music
