= Walter Bricht =

Austrian-born American pianist, composer, teacher (1904–1970)

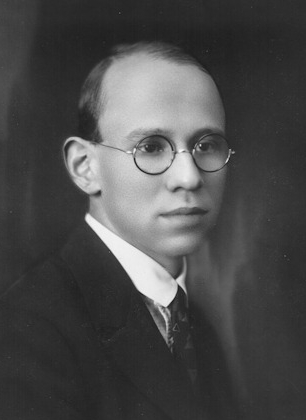
Walter Bricht (ca. 1920)

Walter Bricht (September 21, 1904 – March 20, 1970) was an Austrian-American pianist, composer and teacher.

== Early life ==
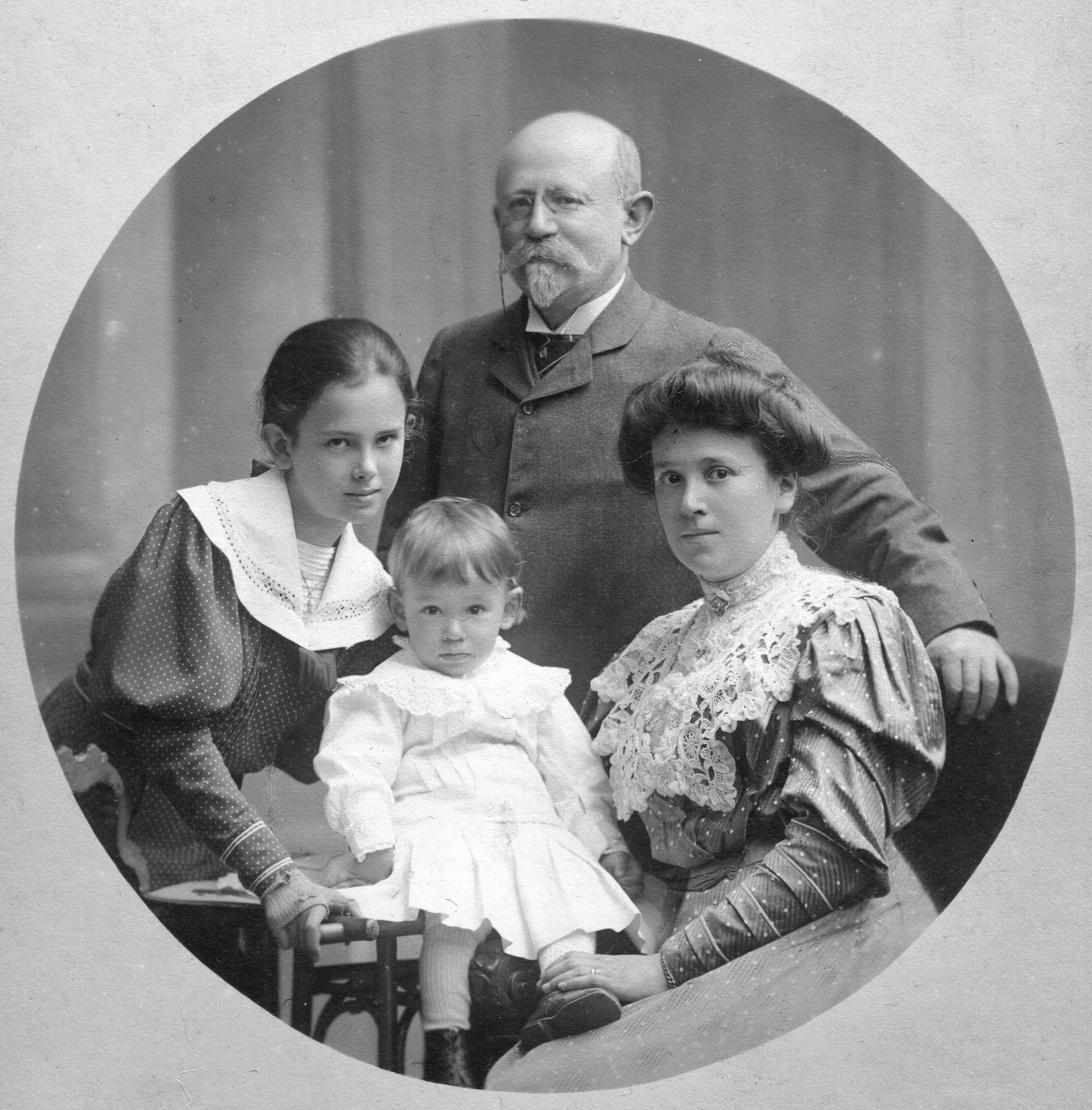
Walter (center) with sister Franziska (left), mother Agnes (right) and father Balduin Bricht (standing; ca; 1906)

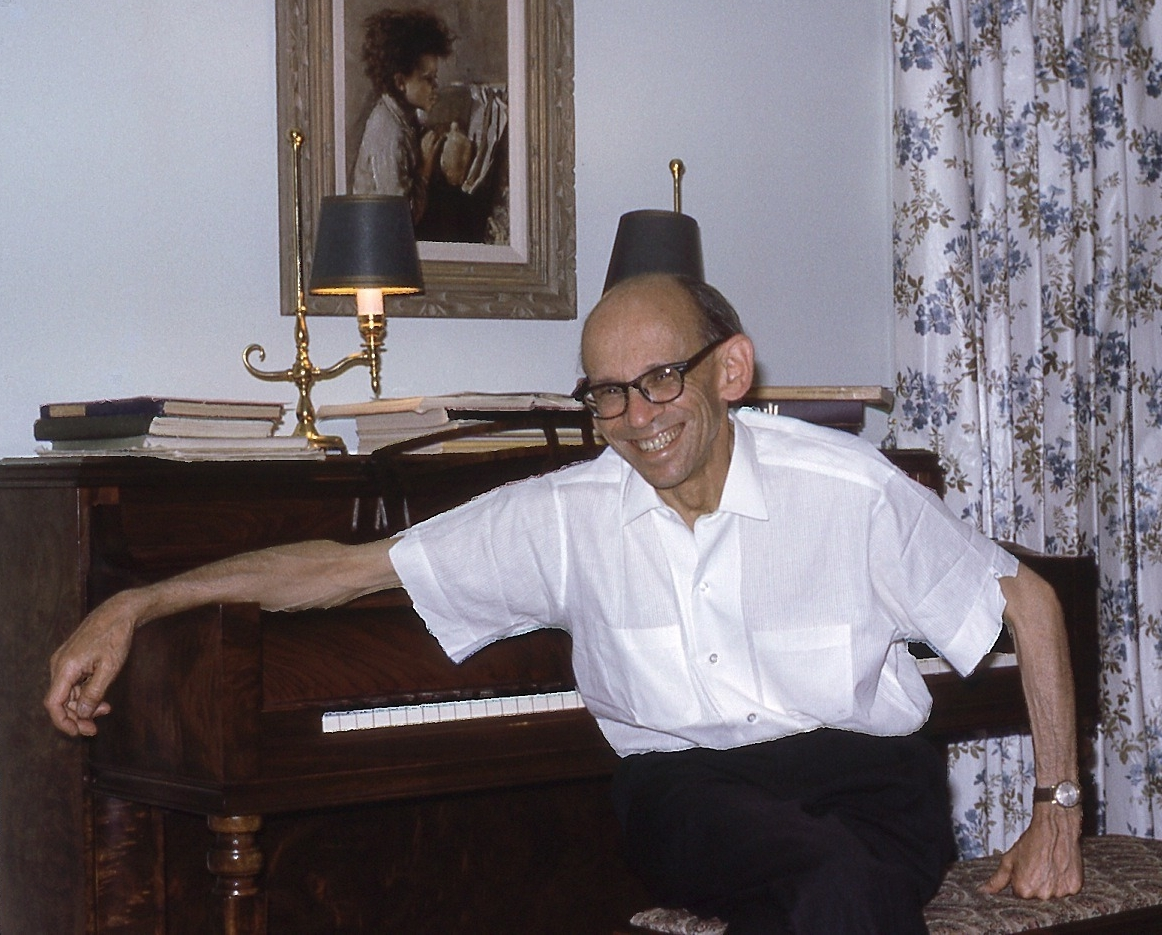
Walter Bricht (1960s)

Born in Vienna, Bricht was exposed to multiple musical influences from his youth. His father, Balduin Bricht, was a music critic for the Oesterreichische Volkszeitung, a newspaper in Vienna. His mother, Agnes Bricht-Pyllemann was a concert singer and pianist, and became his first teacher. His talent was recognized early on. Bricht received his first piano lesson at age four and began composing piano pieces and songs by age twelve. He was educated at the Vienna Academy for Music, graduating in 1928 with degrees in composition, conducting and piano. Bricht was a student of famed composer Franz Schmidt.

== Career and personal life ==
Upon the completion of his education at the Vienna Academy, Bricht taught at the Vienna Volkskonservatorium from 1931 to 1938. From 1934 to 1938, he also taught voice, piano, and composition at the Horak-Schulen in Vienna. As a composer, he was prolific during this period, writing the majority of his works, and hearing many of them publicly performed. In 1938, Bricht was forced to leave Austria, because the Nazi regime had discovered that he had Jewish-born grandparents. He was offered "honorary Aryan status" by Adolf Hitler, providing he would swear allegiance to the Nazi Party, but instead chose to emigrate to the United States of America. All of his important papers and letters of recommendation were confiscated at the border, and he arrived in the U.S. not speaking a word of English.

Upon his arrival in the U.S., Bricht settled in New York City, earning a living by serving as church organist, accompanying and coaching. In 1939, Bricht joined the faculty of the Mason College of Music in Charleston, West Virginia, becoming chairman of the music department the following year. He met his future wife, Donna Kuhn, after hiring her as a professor of violin. Bricht returned to New York in 1944, teaching and coaching there until 1963. He also made regular trips to Washington D.C., to teach members of the U.S. Army Chorus. Two daughters were born to the Brichts during this period, Dana Eve (1955), and Wendy Diane (1959).

In 1963 Bricht was invited to become a professor at the Indiana University School of Music. He was hired as a professor of piano; however, by 1967, he was teaching applied voice and song literature exclusively. He wrote three compositions while at Indiana University, the Sonata for Flute and Piano (1964), the Chaconne for String Quartet (1967), and the Trio for Flute, Cello and Piano (1968). In 1967, an entire recital devoted to his compositions was performed at the Indiana University School of Music to much acclaim.

In the mid-1960s Bricht was diagnosed with emphysema, which resulted in his death in 1970, at the age of 65. He is survived by his daughters Dana Bricht Higbee and Wendy Bricht.

== Compositions ==
Bricht's music is characteristic of the German Late Romantic style, and includes multiple choral works, songs, sonatas, chamber music and symphonic works.

=== Compositions with opus number ===
- Op. 1: Suite in G Dur für Klavier (date unknown)
- Op. 2: Variationen in D Dur über ein eigenes Thema für zwei Klaviere (July 20, 1925)
- Op. 3: Klaviersonate I in G Moll (Winter 1925–1926)
- Op. 4: Klavierkonzert I in F Dur (date unknown)
- Op. 5: Sieben Lieder für Gesang und Klavier (1926–1928)
- Op. 6: Zwei Lieder für Gesang und Klavier (November?–December 14, 1922)
- Op. 7: Klaviersonate II in E Moll (1926)
- Op. 8a: Kleine Variationen in A Moll für Klavier (date unknown)
- Op. 8b: Kleine Variationen in C Moll für Klavier (date unknown)
- Op. 9: Zehn nächtliche Lieder für Gesang und Klavier (1926–1932)
- Op. 10: Klaviersonate III in A Moll ("Grosse") (July 12, 1927)
- Op. 11: Fünfzehn kleine Lieder für Gesang und Klavier (1926–1933)
- Op. 12: Klaviersonate IV in Fis Moll (1928)
- Op. 13: Kleine Klavierstücke (1926–1927)
- Op. 14: Streichquartett I in H Moll (March 18, 1928)
- Op. 15: Zwei Mazurken für Klavier (May 10, 1928)
- Op. 16: Klaviersonate V in D Moll (August 29, 1929)
- Op. 17: Klavierkonzert II in A Moll (February 16, 1929)
- Op. 18a: Verwehte Blätter, für Klavier (1926–1927)
- Op. 18b: Verwehte Blätter: Acht kleine Stücke für Orchester (im zusammenhange aufzuführen) (October 30, 1932)
- Op. 19: Zwei Elementarphantasten für fünfstimmigen/sechsstimmigen Männerchor und großes Orchester (July 29 – August 5, 1930)
- Op. 20: Klaviersonate VI in A Moll ("Kleine") (June 19, 1930)
- Op. 21: Drei Lieder für Gesang und Klavier (date unknown)
- Op. 22: Variationen in Fis Moll über ein Thema von Franz Schmidt für Orgel (June 23, 1931)
- Op. 23: Kleine Tanzstücke für Klavier (1926–1927)
- Op. 24: Vier Lieder für Gesang und Klavier (August 29, 1930)
- Op. 25: Symphonische Suite in A Moll für großes Orchester (October 22, 1931)
- Op. 26: Zwei Lieder für Gesang und Klavier (March 20–21, 1932)
- Op. 27: Variationen und Fuge in Cis Moll über ein eigenes Thema für Orgel (March 30, 1932)
- Op. 28: Fünf Lieder für Gesang und Klavier (May 8–14, 1932)
- Op. 29: Suite in G Moll für Gesang und Klavier (September 5, 1932)
- Op. 30: Vier Klavierstücke für die linke Hand allein (June 17, 1933)
- Op. 31: Drei Lieder für Gesang und Klavier (November 23, 1932)
- Op. 32: Streichquintett in D Moll (September 20, 1933)
- Op. 33: Symphonie in A Moll für großes Orchester (July 16, 1934)
- Op. 34: Sonate in A Moll für Violoncello und Klavier (1936)
- Op. 35: Fünf Lieder für Gesang und Klavier (August 8, 1935)
- Op. 36: Streichquartett II in A Moll (August 8, 1935)
- Op. 37: Das große Halleluja für Männerchor, Orgel, 4 Hörner, 3 Trompeten, 3 Posaunen, Basstuba, Pauken, und Becken (August 11, 1937)
- Op. 38: Possibly the missing Sonate für Violine und Klavier (1938?)
- Op. 39: Klaviersonate VII in E dur (August 4, 1940)
- Op. 40: Variations in F Major on an Old German Children's Song for Pianoforte (left hand alone), Flute (or Violin), and Violoncello (August 18, 1942)

=== Compositions without opus number ===
- WoO 1: Zwei Lieder für Gesang und Klavier (December 16–19, 1919?)
- WoO 2: Zwei Lieder für Gesang und Klavier (March ? – December 6, 1921)
- WoO 3: Elf Lieder für Gesang und Klavier (January 2 – September 6, 1922)
- WoO 4: Drei Lieder für Gesang und Klavier (date unknown)
- WoO 5: Zwei Lieder für Gesang und Klavier (mid-February, 1923 – Winter 1923–24)
- WoO 6: Praeludium, Intermezzo, und Finale in Cis Dur für Orgel (August 31, 1925)
- WoO 7: Zwei Lieder für Gesang und Klavier (January 4 – April 29, 1926)
- WoO 8: Bruchstücken für Klavier (1926-1927?)
- WoO 9: Einrichtung, Satz 3, Streichquartett I in H Moll, für Klavier (1928)
- WoO 10: Duett-Variationen über "Ein Männlein steht im Walde" für Gesängen und Klavier (1931)
- WoO 11: Duett für Gesängen und Klavier (June 3, 1931)
- WoO 12: Duett-Bruchstücke für Gesängen und Klavier (1931)
- WoO 13: Herbst, für gemischten Chor a cappella (September 7, 1932)
- WoO 14: Die Suchenden, für sechsstimmigen Männerchor a cappella (December 26, 1932)
- WoO 15: Phantasie in C Dur über Themen aus Gounod's "Faust" für Klavier (linke Hand allein) (1936)
- WoO 16: Phantasie in A Dur über Themen aus Strauss' "Fledermaus" für Klavier (linke Hand allein) (1937)
- WoO 17: Fünf Lieder für Sopran mit Begleitung von Streichquartett (1937)
- WoO 18: Vier Lieder für Gesang und Klavier (March 17–20, 1940)
- WoO 19: Four Songs for Voice and Piano (December 25, 1940)
- WoO 20: Chorale Prelude on the Hymn "For the Beauty of the Earth" for Organ (date unknown)
- WoO 21: Fragments for Organ (date unknown)
- WoO 22: Quintet in A Minor for Piano and Strings (May 1952)
- WoO 23: Sonata for Flute and Piano (December 8, 1964)
- WoO 24: Chaconne for String Quartet (January 20, 1967)
- WoO 25: Trio for Flute (alternating with Alto Flute and Piccolo), Violoncello, and Piano (May 4, 1968)
