= Wiener Volkskonservatorium =

The Wiener Volkskonservatorium was a conservatory in Vienna established in the summer of 1925 by Ferdinand Grossmann, Emmerich Maday, and Eduard Castle.

It was dissolved in 1938 amidst financial difficulties.

Among its faculty were Ferdinand Grossmann and Fritz Högler, who each served as artistic director, Franz Burkhart, Armin Kaufmann, Viktor Korda, Walter Pach (composer), and Walter Bricht.
