= Rudolf Gerlach-Rusnak =

German lyrical tenor (1895–1960)

- Born: Orest Rusnak; 24 July 1895; Dubiwzi near Czernowitz, Bukovina
- Died: 23 January 1960 (aged 64); Munich
- Occupation: Operatic tenor
- Organizations: Bavarian State Opera

Rudolf Gerlach-Rusnak (Ukrainian: Рудольф Герлах-Руснак; né Orest Rusnak [Орест Руснак]; later known as Gerlach; 24 July 1895 – 23 January 1960) was a German operatic and concert lyrical tenor, and a member of the Bavarian State Opera who had an international career and was known for his exceptional high register.

== Life ==
Rudolf Gerlach-Rusnak was born Orest Rusnak in Dubiwzi near Czernowitz, Bukovina, in modern-day Ukraine. His brother Denis Gerlach (1901-1952, also born in Dubiwzi) was also a professional tenor. He served as an officer in the Austro-Hungarian Army during World War I and in 1917, he was captured by the Russians and caused a commotion in the POW camp, where he recited Ukrainian folk songs in the evenings.

After his release in 1918, Gerlach began his singing studies in Prague with Eugen Fuchs. In 1923, Gerlach made his debut as Rudolf (Rodolfo) in Puccini's La bohème at a performance in Olmütz. From 1924 to 1926, he sang at the Theater of Königsberg, one of Germany's most-respected theaters; he then performed in Stettin from 1926 to 1927. Gerlach resumed his music studies with Jacques Stückgold in Paris and with Dante Lari in Milan. From 1928 to 1930, he sang at Theater Chemnitz and for the next two years at the Graz Opera.

In 1931, Gerlach became a member of the Bavarian State Opera's ensemble in Munich, where he first sang under the name Rudolf Gerlach. He chose the stage name Rudolf from his favorite (and debut) role in La bohème, and took Gerlach from his wife Elisabeth's family name. He later adopted the shorter stage name Gerlach. He remained a part of the Bavarian State Opera company until 1938.

Gerlach performed at the 1934 world premiere of Vittorio Giannini's Lucedia as a guest star from Munich at the Vienna State Opera. On 15 June 1938, he sang the tenor solo in the leading role of John the Evangelist at the world premiere of Franz Schmidt's oratorio Das Buch mit sieben Siegeln (The Book with Seven Seals), which was conducted by Oswald Kabasta, at the Vienna Musikverein. From 1941 to 1942, he was a member of Theater Bremen and then performed as a guest soloist at the Municipal Theater of Innsbruck. In 1944, he became engaged in military operations but returned to the Munich Opera in 1945. Gerlach retired from the stage in 1946 after suffering a heart attack; he resumed singing, and toured Canada and the U.S. between 1956 and 1957.

Gerlach had a lyrical and dramatic tenor voice with an unusual timbre and an exceptionally high register. Among his roles were Chapelou in Adam's Le postillon de Lonjumeau, Edgardo in Donizetti's Lucia di Lammermoor and Fernando in La favorite, Arnold in Rossini's Guglielmo Tell, the Duke in Verdi's Rigoletto and Manrico in Il trovatore, Lionel in Flotow's Martha, Cavarodossi in Puccini's Tosca and Rodolfo in La bohème, and Matteo in Arabella by Richard Strauss. Gerlach made radio productions with broadcasters in Munich, Berlin, and Königsberg; he also recorded Ukrainian folk songs in the U.S. in 1957. His voice has been preserved on various recordings.

Gerlach died in Munich on 23 January 1960 at age 64.
