= Oskar Adler =

Austrian physician, musician and astrologer

Oskar Adler (4 June 1875 – 15 May 1955) was an Austrian violinist, physician and esoteric savant. He was the brother of the political theorist Max Adler and a key early influence on his contemporary Arnold Schoenberg. His friend and student Hans Keller called him "one of our century's supreme (if largely private) instrumentalists".

== Life and career ==
Adler was a close friend of Arnold Schoenberg from their schooldays, Adler taught Schoenberg the rudiments of music, gave him his first grounding in philosophy, and played chamber music with him. Though self-taught, Adler for many years led a string quartet whose regular cellist was another composer-friend, Franz Schmidt. Adler also played in Schoenberg's Society for Private Musical Performances, lectured on music and philosophy, as well as giving musical and spiritual advice to, and casting horoscopes for, many of Vienna's leading creative artists.

In 1935 the violinist Louis Krasner consulted Adler (as well as Carl Flesch) about the solo part of Alban Berg's Violin Concerto, which Krasner had commissioned but could not, at that time, play. Around this time, Adler was also the teacher of the young Hans Keller, later a musician, writer and Schoenberg-expert resident in the UK.

After the Anschluss, Schoenberg tried to arrange for Adler to come to California, but he escaped instead to the United Kingdom after his visa was secured by Hans Keller's brother-in-law Roy Franey. He settled nearby Keller's family in Herne Hill until both of them were sent to the Huyton internment camp near Liverpool. After release he and his wife Paula (Freud) Adler, a fluent pianist, joined Keller's family in the Lake District and performed in chamber music concerts there with Keller. His last years were spent in London. Adler and Schoenberg resumed their friendship by letter in the late 1940s; some of the correspondence is published.

== Writing ==
Adler's principal books were Critique of Pure Music (1918, finally published in 2020), and The Testament of Astrology (published in 3 volumes 1935–37, many subsequent editions), based on lectures given from 1930 in Vienna. The Testament of Astrology was translated into English by his pupil Zdenka Orenstein and edited by Amy Shapiro.

A biography by Shapiro published in 2012 includes letters, stories and memoirs gathered across twenty years of discovery, of people who recounted the central role that Dr. Oskar Adler played in Vienna's pre-Nazi cultural life before 1938 and while in exile.
