= Herbert Lippert =

Austrian operatic tenor (born 1957)

Herbert Lippert (born 7 October 1957) is an Austrian operatic tenor.

== Life ==
Born in Linz, Lippert was a soloist with the Vienna Boys' Choir, studied music teaching at the University of Vienna and graduated with distinction. As a member of the ensemble of the Vienna State Opera he has specialised as a Mozart singer.

He has worked with Sir Georg Solti and Wolfgang Sawallisch, under whose direction numerous recordings such as Haydn's Die Schöpfung, Mozart's Don Giovanni and Wagner's Die Meistersinger von Nürnberg were made. Lippert worked several times with the conductors Nikolaus Harnoncourt, Franz Welser-Möst, Riccardo Muti and Fabio Luisi.

In 2009/10 he made recordings and gave concerts with Harnoncourt and the Concentus Musicus Wien, with Luisi and the Sächsische Staatskapelle Dresden, with Franz Welser-Möst and the Wiener Philharmoniker, as well as opera appearances at the Vienna Volksoper and at the Graz Opera.

In June 2014, he performed at the Vienna State Opera as the replacement of Peter Seiffert who was indisposed in Act 2 as Siegmund in Wagner's Die Walküre. On 15 November 2014 Lippert appeared as Golizyn in Vienna in a new production of Mussorgsky's Khovanshchina.

=== Awards ===
In 1997 he was awarded a Grammy Award for his interpretation of David in Die Meistersinger von Nürnberg.

== Discography ==
An extensive discography of Lippert is available (as of 2010) with well over 300 recordings. Recordings include:

- Tamino in Mozart's Die Zauberflöte, 1994, conducted by Michael Halász.
- David in Wagner's Die Meistersinger von Nürnberg, 1996, conducted by Georg Solti.

== Bibliography ==
- (in German) Herbert Lippert in Oesterreichisches Musiklexikon. Online edition, Vienna 2002 ff., ISBN 3-7001-3077-5; Druckausgabe: volume 3, Verlag der Österreichischen Akademie der Wissenschaften, Vienna 2004, ISBN 3-7001-3045-7.
