= Ferdinand Grossmann =

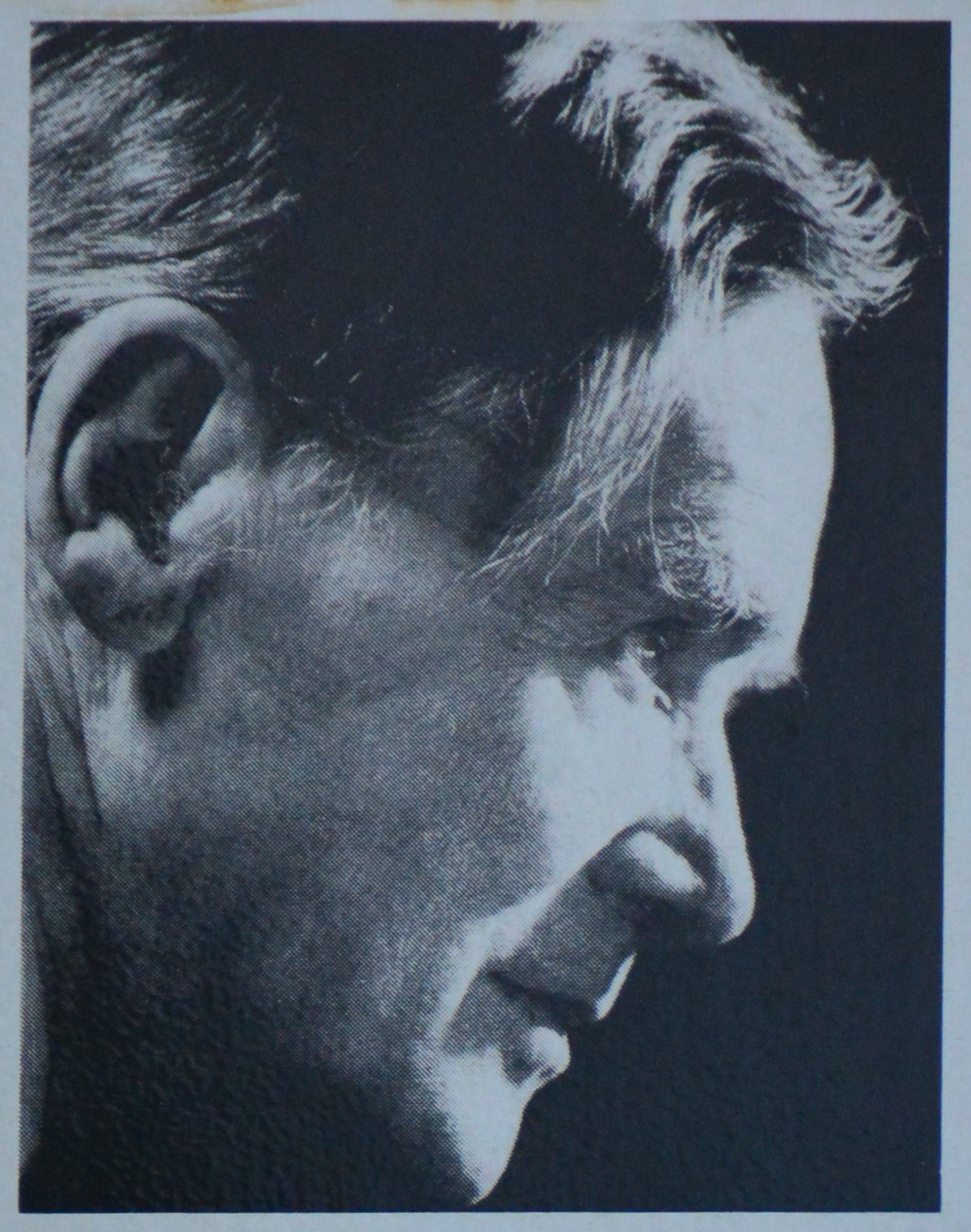

Background information
- Born: 4 July 1887; Tulln, Austria
- Died: 5 December 1970 (aged 83); Vienna, Austria
- Genres: Classical
- Occupation(s): Conductor, pedagogue, composer

Ferdinand Grossmann (4 July 1887 – 5 December 1970) was an Austrian choral conductor, vocal teacher and composer.

He studied music in Linz. Some years later in Vienna he attended a class of conducting given by Felix Weingartner.

In 1923 he established the Wiener Volkskonservatorium. He later became the artistic director of the Wiener Sängerknaben, and led the choir to gain international reputation.
