= Metamorphosen =

Composition by Richard Strauss

- study for 23 solo strings by Richard Strauss
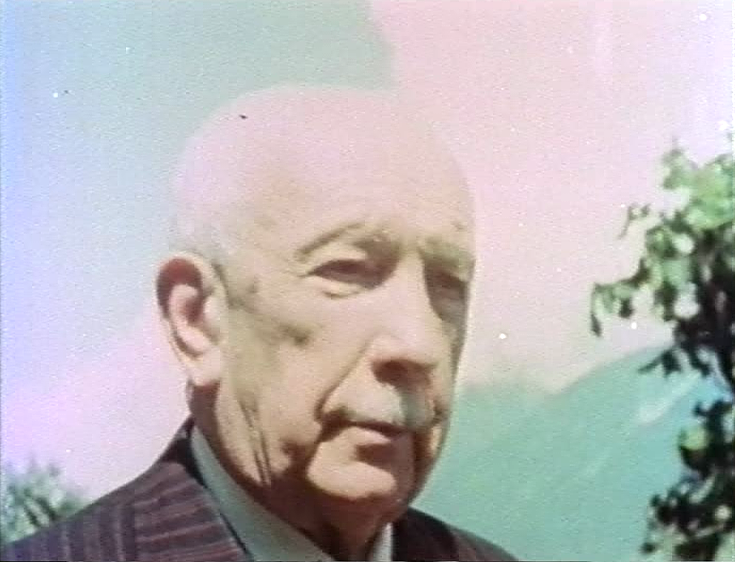
- Strauss in July 1945, picture taken by US Army Special Film Project 186.
- Catalogue: TrV 290
- Composed: 12 April 1945
- Dedication: Paul Sacher
- Scoring: 10 violins, 5 violas, 5 cellos, and 3 double basses

Premiere
- Date: 25 January 1946
- Conductor: Paul Sacher
- Performers: Collegium Musicum Zürich

Metamorphosen, study for 23 solo strings (TrV 290, AV 142) is a composition by Richard Strauss for ten violins, five violas, five cellos, and three double basses, typically lasting 25 to 30 minutes. It was composed during the closing months of the Second World War, from August 1944 to March 1945. The piece was commissioned by Paul Sacher, the founder and director of the Basler Kammerorchester and Collegium Musicum Zürich, to whom Strauss dedicated it. It was first performed on 25 January 1946 by Sacher and the Collegium Musicum Zürich, with Strauss conducting the final rehearsal.

== Composition history ==
By 1944, Strauss was in poor health and needed to visit the Swiss spa at Baden near Zürich. He was unable to get the Nazi government's permission to travel abroad. Karl Böhm, Paul Sacher, and Willi Schuh came up with a plan to get the travel permit: a commission from Sacher and invitation to the premiere in Zurich. The commission was made in a letter by Böhm on August 28, 1944, for a "suite for strings". Strauss replied that he had been working for some time on an adagio for 11 strings. In fact, his early work on Metamorphosen was for a septet (2 violins, 2 violas, 2 cellos and a bass). The starting date for the score is given as 13 March 1945, which suggests that the destruction of the Vienna opera house the previous day gave Strauss the impetus to finish the work and draw together his previous sketches in just one month (finished on 12 April 1945).

As with his other late works, Strauss builds the music from a series of small melodic ideas "which are the point of departure for the development of the entire composition". In this unfolding of ideas "Strauss applies here all of the rhetorical means developed over the centuries to express pain". But he also alternates passages in a major key expressing hope and optimism with passages of sadness, as in the finales of both Gustav Mahler's 6th Symphony and Pyotr Ilyich Tchaikovsky's 6th Symphony. The overall structure of the piece is "a slow introduction, a quick central section, and a return to the initial slower tempo", which echoes the structure of Death and Transfiguration.

There are five basic thematic elements in Metamorphosen. First, there are the opening chords. Second, there is the repetition of three short notes followed by a fourth long note. Third, there is the direct quote from bar 3 of the "Marcia funebre" from Beethoven's Eroica Symphony. Fourth, there is a minor theme with triplets. Fifth, there is the lyrical theme "that becomes the source of much of the contrasting music in major, sunnier keys". The second theme does not stand on its own, but precedes the third and fourth themes. Its most obvious source is Beethoven's 5th Symphony, for example the short-short-short-long repetition of G played by the horns in the third movement. But it has other progenitors: the Finale of Mozart's Jupiter Symphony (a personal favorite of Strauss as a conductor) and the Fugue from Bach's Solo Violin Sonata in G minor BWV 1001. Strauss also used it in the Oboe Concerto, written only a few months after Metamorphosen, displaying "a remarkable example of the thematic links between the last instrumental works". He had also used this motif over 60 years before in his 1881 Piano Sonata.

At the end of Metamorphosen, Strauss quotes the first four bars of the Eroica's "Marcia funebre" with the annotation "IN MEMORIAM!" at the bottom. Metamorphosen exhibits the complex counterpoint for which Strauss showed a predilection throughout his life.

== Meaning ==
The title and inspiration for Metamorphosen comes from two profoundly self-examining poems of the same title by Goethe, which Strauss had considered setting as a choral work. Strauss's chronological rereading of Goethe during 1944 was a crucial influence; he told a visitor: "I am reading him as he developed and as he finally became.... Now that I am old myself I will be young again with Goethe and then again old with him—with his eyes. For he was a man of eyes—he saw what I heard." According to Norman Del Mar, Strauss wrote out additional lines "of searching introspection" from Goethe's poem Widmung ("Dedication") "in full amongst the pages of sketches for Metamorphosen, the word Metamorphosen being itself a term Goethe used in old age to apply to his own mental development over a great period of time in pursuit of ever more exalted thinking". Goethe's ideas of metamorphosis also contained the concept of the inherent archetype of each being, and that no matter how much change occurred, its essential core still remained.

Generally regarded as one of the masterpieces of the string repertoire, Metamorphosen contains Strauss's most sustained outpouring of tragic emotion. Conceived and written during the blackest days of World War II, it expresses Strauss's mourning of, among other things, the destruction of German culture—including the bombing of every great opera house in the nation. In Strauss's sketchbook for Metamorphosen is an entry that simply says, "Mourning Munich", referring to the destruction of its opera house the National Theatre, where he had worked for many years.

At the very end of the work, "Im Memoriam!" is written in the score and the lower voices quote the theme from the funeral march from Beethoven's Eroica Symphony.

A few days after finishing Metamorphosen, Strauss wrote in his diary:

The most terrible period of human history is at an end, the twelve year reign of bestiality, ignorance and anti-culture under the greatest criminals, during which Germany's 2,000 years of cultural evolution met its doom.

== Main themes ==
The main themes of Metamorphosen are given here at the pitch they first occur. The first four themes occur in the first 20 bars. The fifth theme occurs at bar 82, with the tempo marking "etwas fließender" (slightly flowing).

== Arrangements ==
An arrangement for string septet (two violins, two violas, two cellos, one bass) by Rudolf Leopold was published in 1996.

== Sources ==
- Del Mar, Norman (1986). Richard Strauss: A Critical Commentary on his Life and Works (2nd ed.) London: Faber and Faber. ISBN 978-0-571-25098-1.
- Hurwitz, David (2014). Richard Strauss: An Owner's Manual. Milwaukee: Amadeus Press, ISBN 978-1-57467-442-2.
- Kennedy, Michael (1999), Richard Strauss: Man, Musician, Enigma. Cambridge University Press. ISBN 9780521027748.
- Leopold, Rudolf. (n.d.) "Metamorphosen ((Realisation for String Septet)". Boosey & Hawkes. ISMN 9790060102660
- May, Juergen (2010). "Late Works". In Youmans, Charles (ed.) The Cambridge Companion to Richard Strauss, pp. 178–192. Cambridge Companions to Music. Cambridge and New York: Cambridge University Press, ISBN 978-0-521-72815-7.
- Wilhelm, Kurt (1989). Richard Strauss: An Intimate Portrait. London: Thames & Hudson, ISBN 978-0-500-01459-2.
- Ross, Alex (2009). The Rest Is Noise: Listening to the Twentieth Century. New York: Farrar, Straus, and Giroux. ISBN 978-0-374-24939-7.
