= Oswald Kabasta =

Austrian conductor (1896–1946)

Oswald Kabasta

Oswald Kabasta (December 29, 1896 – February 6, 1946) was an Austrian conductor.

== Life and career ==
1930s performance of the then-Austrian national anthem by the Wiener Symphonie-Orchester, conducted by Kabasta.

Kabasta was born in Mistelbach, Austria and later studied with composer Franz Schmidt. In 1931 he became head of conducting at the Vienna Academy. He also served as musical director of Vienna Radio about this time. In 1938 he became principal conductor of the Munich Philharmonic. His interpretations, especially of Anton Bruckner, are admired for their intensity and rhythmic drive. He enjoyed the public approbation of Adrian Boult, who announced in a 1938 radio broadcast that:

The present high reputation of the Vienna Symphony Orchestra is due to Professor Kabasta who, with Sir Henry Wood and Dr. Mengelberg, commands our admiration by virtue of sheer mastery in the business of conducting. Quite apart from their merits as musicians and artists, they are superb craftsmen.

Kabasta was an enthusiastic supporter of the Nazi regime. After the Anschluss in 1938, he signed all his letters with, "Heil Hitler!" After the end of World War II, Kabasta was forbidden to work as a conductor by the Allies when he admitted that he had applied to join the Nazi Party (although he claimed to be "inwardly anti-Nazi"). In October 1945 the denazification authorities ordered the city of Munich to discontinue his salary. Devastated by his dismissal, and his relegation to the status of "common laborer", he committed suicide in Kufstein, Austria in 1946.

== Notable premieres ==
- Franz Schmidt, The Book with Seven Seals, Vienna Symphony, Vienna, 15 June 1938.
