= Operklosterneuburg =

Austrian opera festival

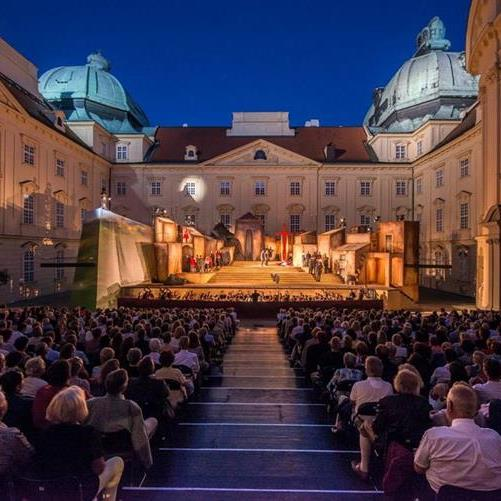
operklosterneuburg Imperial Court

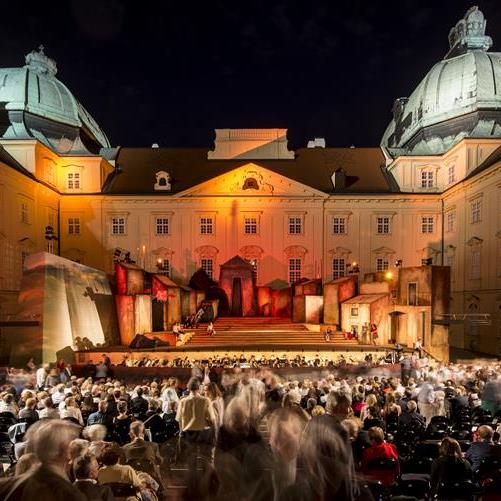
operklosterneuburg Imperial Court

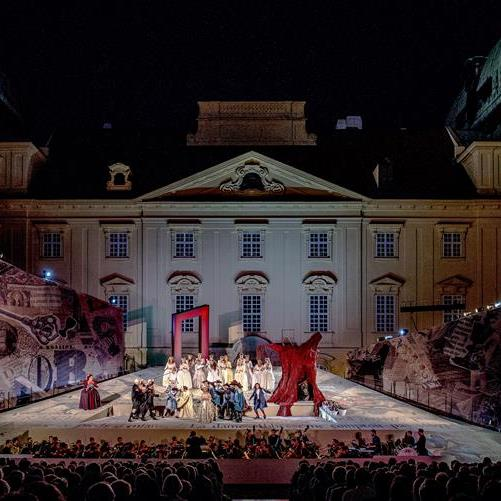
operklosterneuburg Imperial Court Le Comte Ory

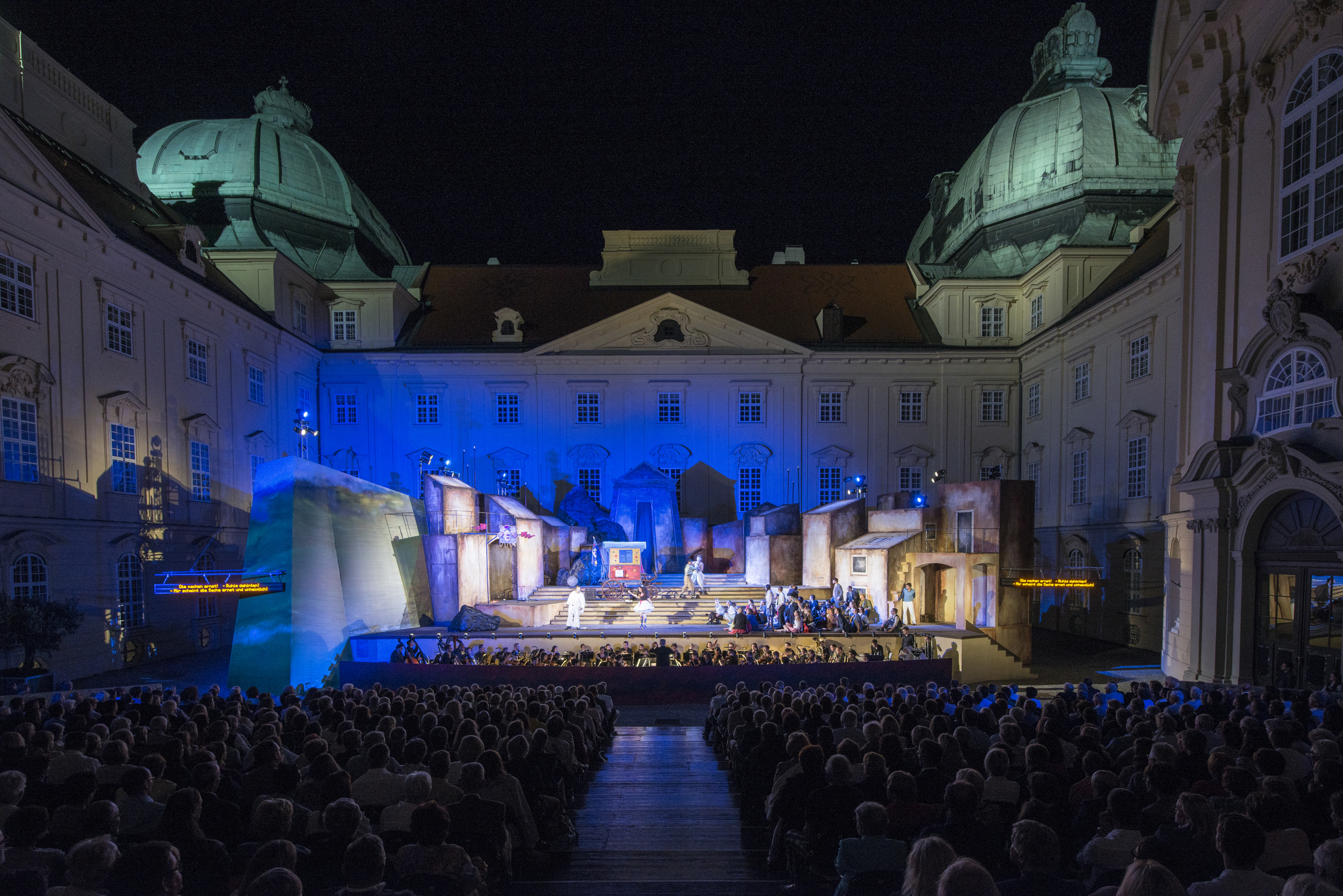
operklosterneuburg Imperial Court

The operklosterneuburg is an Austrian opera festival held annually in the baroque imperial courtyard of Klosterneuburg Abbey in Lower Austria.

== History ==
The festival was founded in 1993 by Alexander Hermann and Sonja Fletzberger and takes place in July and August. Since 1998 it has been under the direction of Michael Garschall.

In contrast to other Austrian summer festivals, the Klosterneuburg Opera follows a moderately modern line in its productions. The directors who have worked here include Max Augenfeld, Nikolaus Büchel, François de Carpentries, Michael Garschall, Isabella Gregor, Andy Hallwaxx, Alexander Hauer, Jens-Daniel Herzog, Gernot Kranner (children's versions), Markus Kupferblum, Matthias Lutz, Henry Mason and Julian Pölsler, Michael Scheidl, Karl M. Sibelius, Kurt Sobotka, Matthias von Stegmann, Alexander Waechter. The comparatively sparse furnishings are closely matched to the existing architecture. The natural acoustics of the Abbey courtyard enable singing without amplification or other technical manipulation. For numerous soloists, a performance at the festival was a springboard to an international career.

Initially, the Czech Philharmonic Orchestra under Konstantin Schenk, Andreas Stöhr and Matthias Fletzberger was the main orchestra. Since 2000, the Sinfonietta Baden (since 2017 Beethoven Philharmonie, which has performed under various conductors – including Guido Mancusi (1997 to 2000), Thomas Rösner (2001 to 2003, 2014), Andrés Orozco-Estrada (2004 to 2007), Enrico Calesso (2008 to 2010), Vinzenz Praxmarer (2011) and Christoph Campestrini (2012, 2013, since 2015) – have been involved.

The production of Giuseppe Verdi's La forza del destino planned for 2020 will not take place until 2021 because of the COVID-19 pandemic in Austria.

== Repertoire ==
- 1994 Hänsel und Gretel by Humperdinck
- 1995 Zar und Zimmermann bu Albert Lortzing
- 1996 Die lustigen Weiber von Windsor by Nicolai
- 1997 Gianni Schicchi by Puccini and Abu Hassan by Weber
- 1998 The Barber of Seville by Rossini (among others with Carsten Süss and Andreas Schager
- 1999 Le nozze di Figaro by Mozart (among others with Frauke Schäfer, Markus Werba and Florian Boesch)
- 2000 Die Entführung aus dem Serail by Mozart (among others with Kristiane Kaiser)
- 2001 La Cenerentola by Rossini (among others with Annely Peebo)
- 2002 L'elisir d'amore by Donizetti (among others with Eva Lind and Pavol Breslik)
- 2003 The Magic Flute by Mozart (among others with Günther Groissböck and Adrian Eröd)
- 2004 The Bartered Bride by Smetana (among others with Sandra Trattnigg)
- 2005 L'italiana in Algeri by Rossini (among others with Stella Grigorian)
- 2006 The Tales of Hoffmann by Offenbach (among others with Bojidar Nikolov, Clemens Unterreiner)
- 2007 Fidelio by Beethoven (among others with Marion Ammann, Clemens Unterreiner)
- 2008 Don Giovanni by Mozart (among others with Klemens Sander, Netta Or, Iurie Ciobanu)
- 2009 La fille du régiment by Donizetti (among others with Daniela Fally, Clemens Unterreiner)
- 2010 Carmen by Bizet (among others with Katarina Bradić, Bruno Ribeiro and Ana Puche Rosado)
- 2011 Le nozze di Figaro by Mozart (among others with Zoe Nicolaidou and Thomas Tatzl)
- 2012 Don Pasquale by Donizetti (among others with Marc-Olivier Oetterli, Chiara Skerath and Arthur Espiritu)
- 2013 Die lustigen Weiber von Windsor by Nicolai (among others with Talia Or, Dshamilja Kaiser, Christian Hübner and Patrick Vogel)
- 2014 Die Zauberflöte (Jubiläum 20 Jahre operklosterneuburg) by Mozart (among others with Antje Bitterlich, Ilker Arcayürek and Martin Achrainer)
- 2015 Rigoletto by Verdi (among others with Daniela Fally, Arthur Espiritu, Paolo Rúmetz and Ilseyar Khayrullova)
- 2016Cavalleria rusticana by Mascagni (among others with Stella Grigorian, Stefania Toczyska, Bruno Ribeiro and Sebastian Holecek)
- 2016 Der Bajazzo by Leoncavallo (with Eugenia Dushina, Zurab Zurabishvili, Clemens Unterreiner, Klemens Sander and Maximilian Mayer)
- 2017 Le comte Ory by Rossini (among others with Iurie Ciobanu, Daniela Fally, Margarita Gritskova, Peter Kellner, Martin Achrainer, Caroline Wilson, Florina Ilie)
- 2018 La traviata by Verdi (among others with Eugenia Dushina, Arthur Espiritu, Günter Haumer, Christiane Döcker, Oscar Rubén Oré Alarcón, Apostol Milenkov, Alexander Grassauer, Florian Köfler, Florina Ilie)
- 2019 The Tales of Hoffmann by Offenbach (among others with Florina Ilie, Daniela Fally, Zurab Zurabishvili, Clemens Unterreiner)
- 2021 La forza del destino by Verdi (among others with Karina Flores, Margarita Gritskova, Anja Mittermüller, Zurab Zurabishvili, David Babayants, Matheus França, Marian Pop, Walter Fink)
