= Michael Garschall =

Austrian artistic director, cultural manager and theatre director

Michael Garschall (born 1967) is an Austrian artistic director, cultural manager and theatre director.

== Career ==
Garschall was born in Amstetten, Lower Austria and grew up in Blindenmarkt where he followed theatre studies and Medienpädagogik at the University of Vienna und sammelt erste Erfahrungen bei Festspielen, unter anderem als Regieassistent von Elfriede Ott and Heinz Ehrenfreund. From 1994 until 1998, zeichnete er als Pressereferent der Anton Bruckner Private University in Linz für die Organisation von Veranstaltungen verantwortlich. 2001 bis 2004 war er bei Steinway in Austria in Wien im Bereich Marketing und Organisation tätig.

== Autumn Days Blindenmarkt ==
In 1990, while still a student, Garschall founded the operetta festival Herbsttage Blindenmarkt in his home municipality. Since its inception, more than 270,000 guests have attended this Mostviertel festival. Thanks to Garschall's commitment, the long-standing heart project of a modern venue for the Herbsttage Blindenmarkt could be realised with the opening of the Ybbsfeldhalle in 2016. The declared aim of the festival is the contemporary presentation of the operetta genre. Garschall repeatedly focuses on operetta rarities, whose productions are well received far beyond the borders of Lower Austria. Another characteristic feature is the successful combination of professional artists and amateurs from the region.

In 2007, initiiert Garschall gemeinsam mit der Unternehmerin Hilde Umdasch die Sozialinitiative helfen mit kunst, um benachteiligten Menschen jedes Jahr den Besuch einer Operettenvorstellung zu ermöglichen. Seit 2019 hat er das Konzert für alle ins Leben gerufen, um potentielles Klassik-Publikum bei freiem Antritt anzuwerben.

== Opera Klosterneuburg ==
Since 1998, Garschall has directed the operklosterneuburg, which over the years has risen to become Austria's third largest open-air opera festival... For numerous young singers, the festival became a springboard for international careers, including Daniela Fally, Annely Peebo, Florian Boesch, Markus Werba, Pavol Breslik, Günther Groissböck, as well as conductors such as Thomas Rösner and Andrés Orozco-Estrada. In addition to popular works of opera literature from Mozart to Donizetti to Verdi, the programme also includes lesser-known works such as Rossini's comic opera Le Comte Ory. For the younger generation, the festival offers specially adapted versions - the Oper für Kinder.

== Functions ==
Garschall was involved in the provincial and national board of the Wirtschaftsforum der Führungskräfte and held numerous functions in the Theaterfest Niederösterreich. As a jury member, he takes part in various singing competitions (Nico-Dostal-Operetta Competition, Konservatorium Wien Privatuniversität, Klassik Mania etc.) and participates in the jury of the literature competition Forum Land as well as in the Kulturbeirat des Amtes der Niederösterreichischen Landesregierung.

== Productions ==
Garschall staged among others L'Elisir d'Amore by Gaetano Donizetti (operklosterneuburg), the Barber of Seville by Giovanni Paisiello and La Contessina by Florian Leopold Gassmann (Festwochen Schärding), La Serva Padrona by Giovanni Battista Pergolesi (Schloss Hof), Orpheus in the Underworld by Jacques Offenbach and Die Fledermaus by Johann Strauss (Herbsttage Blindenmarkt).

== Awards ==
- 1993: Bronze Badge of Honour of the municipality of Blindenmarkt.
- 1994: Award of the Province of Lower Austria
- 1999: Gold Badge of Honour of the Market Town of Blindenmarkt
- 2000: Award of the Lower Austrian Regional School Board
- 2003/2006: Thanks and recognition of the Lower Austrian Regional School Board
- 2003: Recognition Award of the Province of Lower Austria for the Performing Arts
- 2004: Ring of Honour of the Market Town of Blindenmarkt
- 2007: Golden coat of arms of the municipality of Klosterneuburg
- 2015: Golden Mark of Honour for Services to the Province of Lower Austria
- 2017: Culture Award of the Municipality of Klosterneuburg
- 2021: Decoration of Honour for Services to the Republic of Austria
