= Sandra Trattnigg =

Austrian opera and concert soprano (born 1976)

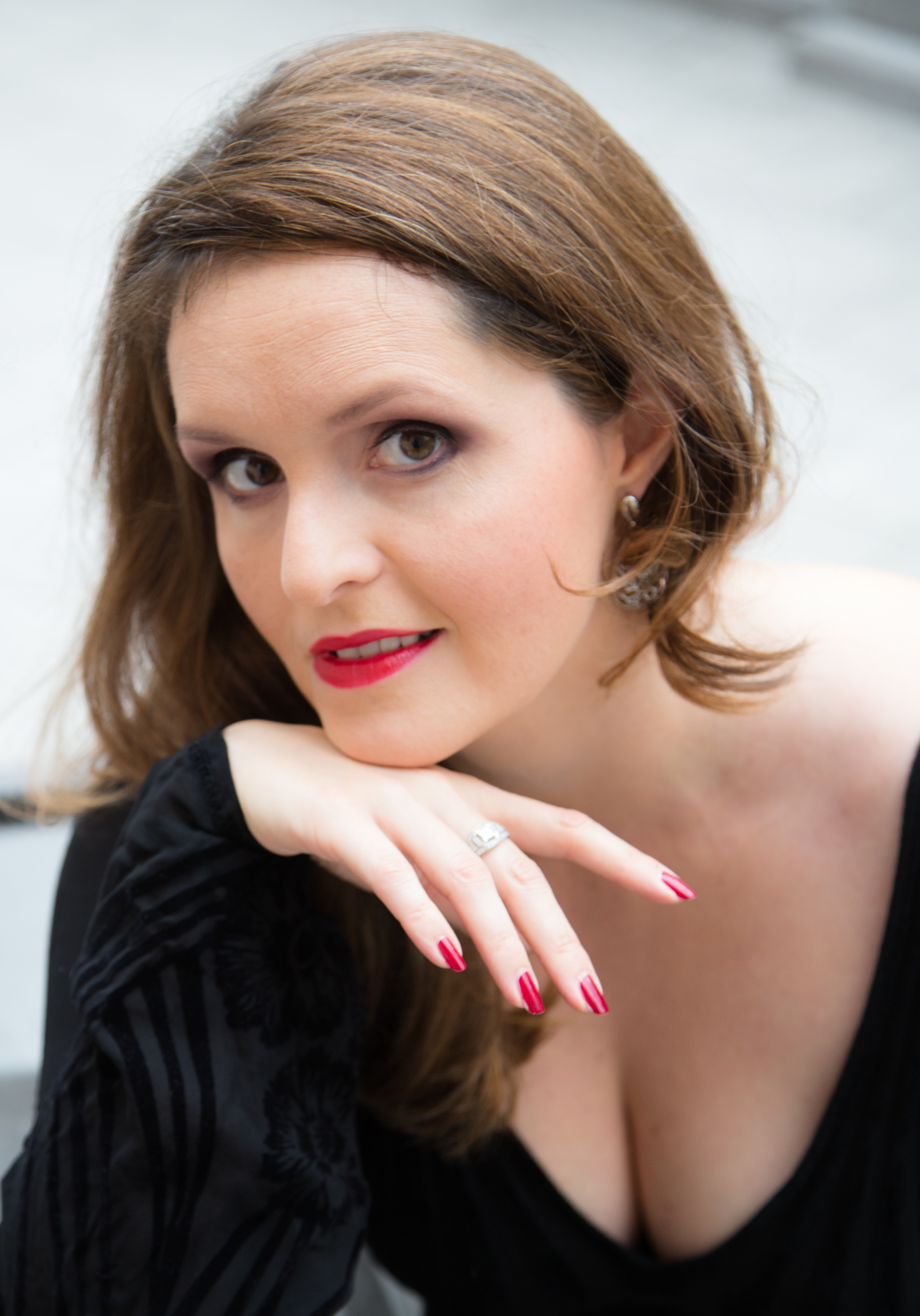
- Trattnigg in 2013
- Born: 14 November 1976 (age 49); Klagenfurt, Austria
- Occupation: Operatic soprano

Sandra Trattnigg (born 14 November 1976) is an Austrian opera and concert soprano.

== Life ==
Trattnigg was born in Klagenfurt in South Carinthia in 1976 and has been living in Zürich since 2005. She received her musical training at the University of Music and Performing Arts in Vienna at Helena Lazarska (vocal coach) as well as Edith Mathis (song and oratorio). In 2001, she won the Kammeroper Schloss Rheinsberg competition (Berlin). In 2002, she was the laureate of the Musica Juventutis competition of the Konzerthaus, Vienna, and received a sponsorship award from the Mozarteum University Salzburg in 2003.

Trattnigg made her opera debut at the Schlosstheater Schönbrunn, singing Euridice in Gluck's Orfeo ed Euridice. She then continued to sing Cleopatra in Handel's Giulio Cesare in Egitto in Vienna, Donna Elvira in Mozart's Don Giovanni at the chamber opera at Schloss Rheinsberg, Pamina in his Die Zauberflöte, Mařenka in Smetana's The Bartered Bride and Antonia in Offenbach's The Tales of Hoffmann at the opera Klosterneuburg as well as Micaëla in Bizet's Carmen at the municipal theatre of Klagenfurt. She was then engaged at the Zürich Opera by Nikolaus Harnoncourt, where she has performed in roles such as Pamina, First Lady, Drusilla, Celia, Anna Geppone, First Flower Girl, The Duchess of Parma, Solveig, Marzelline, Micaëla, Vitellia, Rosalinde, Elisabeth und Gutrune. She sang in the Palau de les Arts Reina Sofía in Valencia as Marzelline (Fidelio) conducted by Zubin Mehta and performed as the main part in the premiere of Anno Schreier's Die Stadt der Blinden as well as Regina in Hindemith's Mathis der Maler in Zürich. In the Summer of 2012, she sang in The Magic Flute at the Salzburg Festival and performed as Freia in Das Rheingold in Leipzig.

Trattnigg is also a concert singer. Appearances in all important European musical centers reflect her broad repertoire, her frequent engagements as well as her musical versatility: The Salzburg Festival, the Carinthian Summer, Konzerthaus and Musikverein Vienna, Tonhalle Zürich or the Gewandhaus in Leipzig being only some of her various stations in Europe. 2011 she sang the St Luke Passion of Krzysztof Penderecki with the Dresden Philharmonic. Conducted by Ingo Metzmacher, Trattnigg also sung Martha in a rendition of Schubert's Lazarus with the German Symphony Orchestra Berlin. Up to now, Trattnigg has worked with conductors such as Nikolaus Harnoncourt, Zubin Mehta, Franz Welser-Möst, Fabio Luisi, Bernard Haitink, Nello Santi, Christian Thielemann, Marc Minkowski, Thomas Rösner, Andrés Orozco-Estrada, Ivor Bolton, Christoph von Dohnányi, Philippe Jordan, Ingo Metzmacher, Daniele Gatti, Ulf Schirmer, Plácido Domingo and Krzysztof Penderecki.

== Repertoire (selection) ==
=== Opera repertoire ===
- Ludwig van Beethoven: Fidelio – Marzelline
- Georges Bizet: Carmen – Michaela
- Ferruccio Busoni: Doktor Faust – Herzogin von Parma
- Christoph Willibald Gluck: Orfeo ed Euridice – Euridice
- HK Gruber: Der Herrr Nordwind – Anna Geppone
- Paul Hindemith: Mathis der Maler – Regina
- Claudio Monteverdi: L'incoronazione di Poppea – Drusilla
- Wolfgang Amadeus Mozart: The Magic Flute – Pamina / Erste Dame
- Wolfgang Amadeus Mozart: Don Giovanni – Donna Elvira
- Wolfgang Amadeus Mozart: Così fan tutte – Fiordiligi
- Wolfgang Amadeus Mozart: La clemenza di Tito – Vitellia
- Wolfgang Amadeus Mozart: Il re pastore – Tamiri
- Jacques Offenbach: Les Contes d'Hoffmann – Antonia
- Anno Schreier: Die Stadt der Blinden – Frau des Augenarztes
- Bedřich Smetana: The Bartered Bride – Marie
- Johann Strauss II: Die Fledermaus – Rosalinde
- Richard Strauss: Ariadne auf Naxos – Echo
- Richard Strauss: Die Frau ohne Schatten – Stimme des Falken / Hüter der Schwelle
- Richard Wagner: Tannhäuser – Elisabeth
- Richard Wagner: Götterdämmerung – Gutrune / III Norne
- Richard Wagner: Parsifal – 1. Blumenmädchen
- Richard Wagner: Die Walküre – Ortlinde
- Richard Wagner: Das Rheingold – Freia
- Carl Maria von Weber: Der Freischütz – Agathe
- Riccardo Zandonai: Francesca da Rimini – Garsenda

=== Concert repertoire ===
- Johann Sebastian Bach: Christmas Oratorio
- Johann Sebastian Bach: St Matthew Passion
- Johann Sebastian Bach: Cantatas BWV 21, 89, 93, 155, 163, 193, 199
- Ludwig van Beethoven: Symphony No. 9
- Ludwig van Beethoven: Egmont, Op. 84
- Ludwig van Beethoven: Mass in C major
- Anton Bruckner: Mass No. 3 in F minor
- Gabriel Fauré: Requiem
- Edvard Grieg: Peer Gynt – Solveig
- George Frideric Handel: Solomon – The Queen of Sheba
- Joseph Haydn: "Berenice, che fai", (scena di Berenice)
- Gustav Mahler: Symphony No. 4 – Die himmlischen Freuden
- Gustav Mahler: Symphony No. 8 – Mater Gloriosa
- Gustav Mahler: Des Knaben Wunderhorn
- Felix Mendelssohn: Elijah
- Wolfgang Amadeus Mozart: Requiem
- Wolfgang Amadeus Mozart: Missa brevis D major, K. 194
- Wolfgang Amadeus Mozart: Coronation Mass
- Wolfgang Amadeus Mozart: Great Mass in C minor, K. 427 – Sopran I
- Wolfgang Amadeus Mozart: Vesperae solennes de confessore
- Krzysztof Penderecki: Symphony No. 7 ("Seven Gates of Jerusalem")
- Krzysztof Penderecki: St Luke Passion
- Giovanni Battista Pergolesi: Stabat mater
- Franz Schmidt: Das Buch mit sieben Siegeln
- Franz Schubert: Mass No. 2
- Franz Schubert: Mass No. 5
- Franz Schubert: various Lieder with orchestra
- Franz Schubert: Lazarus – Martha
- Richard Strauss: Vier letzte Lieder
- Richard Strauss: various Lieder with orchestra
- Alexander Zemlinsky: Lyrische Symphonie

== Discography (selection) ==
=== CD recordings ===
- 2006 Franz Schubert – Messe in As-Dur
- 2006 Gustav Mahler – 4. Symphonie, Fabio Luisi (Conductor) and MDR Sinfonieorchester
- 2008 Franz Schmidt – Das Buch mit sieben Siegeln

=== DVD recordings ===
- 2006 Ferruccio Busoni – Doktor Faust, Philippe Jordan (Conductor)
- 2007 Wolfgang Amadeus Mozart – Die Zauberflöte, Nikolaus Harnoncourt (Conductor)
- 2007 Franz Schubert – Fierrabras, Franz Welser-Möst (Conductor)
- 2007 Richard Wagner – Parsifal, Bernard Haitink (Conductor)
- 2007 Richard Strauss – Ariadne auf Naxos, Christoph von Dohnányi (Conductor)
- 2007 Benjamin Britten – Peter Grimes, Franz Welser-Möst (Conductor)
- 2010 Ludwig van Beethoven – Fidelio, Bernard Haitink (Conductor)
- 2014 Wolfgang Amadeus Mozart – Die Zauberflöte, Nikolaus Harnoncourt (Conductor)

== Awards ==
- 2005 Women's Culture Award for Music in Carinthia ("Frauenkulturpreis für Musik des Landes Kärnten (Austria)" in German)
