= Klemens Sander =

Austrian baritone (born before 1980

Klemens Sander (born before 1980) is an Austrian baritone.

== Life ==
=== Education ===
Born in Steyr, Upper Austria, Sander (married and stage name, born Klemens Geyrhofer) was first a member of the St. Florianer Sängerknaben before going on to study solo, Lied and oratorio at the University of Music and Performing Arts Vienna with Helena Łazarska, Robert Holl and David Lutz. In 2000/2001, he was a scholarship holder of the Tokyo Foundation and in 2001/2002 of the Thyll-Dürr Foundation. He received further artistic impulses in master classes by Gundula Janowitz, Dagmar Pecková, Hartmut Höll and Thomas Hampson. Already during his studies he sang at the Vienna Volksoper.

=== Engagements ===
From 2003 to 2006, he was a member of the ensemble of the Badisches Staatstheater Karlsruhe, where his roles included Papageno (The Magic Flute), Count Almaviva (Le nozze di Figaro), Belcore (L'elisir d'amore), Marcello (La Bohème), Ping (Turandot), Donner (Das Rheingold) and Onegin (Eugene Onegin).

Since 2005, guest engagements have taken him among others to the Neue Oper Wien (Seikyo in Tan Dun's opera Tea, Socrates in Krenek's Pallas Athene weint and the title role in the Austrian premiere of Manfred Trojahn's Orest) to the Salzburg Festival (Schreker: Die Gezeichneten), to the Grand Théâtre de Luxembourg (Papageno in The Magic Flute), to the Badisches Staatstheater Karlsruhe (Donner in Das Rheingold), to the Theater an der Wien (G. F. Händel's Giulio Cesare in Egitto, F. Poulenc Dialogues of the Carmelites and Strauss' Intermezzo), to the Operklosterneuburg (title role in Don Giovanni, Escamillo in Carmen and Silvio in Pagliacci) and to the opera houses of Dijon, Caen and Limoges (Papageno in Die Zauberflöte).

From 2008/2009, he was associated with the Volksoper Wien with residency contracts and sang among others roles such as Papageno (Die Zauberflöte), Dr. Falke (Die Fledermaus), Lord Kookburn (Fra Diavolo) and Harlekin (Ariadne auf Naxos).

In 2018/19, Sander appeared, among other roles, as Papageno in Romeo Castellucci's internationally acclaimed new interpretation of Mozart's Magic Flute at the Opéra de Lille.

In addition to opera, Sander is also active in the concert field. In 2005, he gave Charles Spencer (piano) his recital debut at London's Wigmore Hall. Concert invitations have taken him throughout Europe, to Japan and the US, including to the Berlin Philharmonie, London's Wigmore Hall, the Suntory Hall Tokyo, the Gewandhaus Leipzig, the Mozarteum Salzburg, the Laeiszhalle Hamburg, the Wiener Musikverein and the Wiener Konzerthaus, to the Salzburg Easter Festival, the Carinthian Summer, the Schleswig-Holstein Music Festival and the Oxford Lieder Festival. He has worked with the conductors Kent Nagano, Bertrand de Billy, Georges Prêtre, Franz Welser-Möst, Leopold Hager, Helmuth Rilling, René Jacobs, Martin Haselböck, Christopher Moulds, Christian Arming, Andrés Oroczco-Estrada, Thomas Dausgaard, Christophe Rousset, Stefan Vladar, Eivind Gullberg Jensen, H. K. Gruber, Andreas Spering and Jérémie Rhorer.

Concert highlights included Gabriel Fauré's Requiem under Georges Prêtre at the Berlin Philharmonie and Schubert's E-major Mass conducted by Franz Welser-Möst. He also performed Fauré's Requiem at Mitteldeutscher Rundfunk in Leipzig, Handel's Judas Maccabäus and the Messiah at the Vienna Konzerthaus, Beethoven's Missa solemnis at the Vienna Musikverein, Orff's Carmina Burana in Tokyo, Taipei and Madrid, Haydn's Die Schöpfung at the Brucknerhaus Linz, Szymanowski's Stabat Mater at the Festival of Polish Music Krakow, as well as Brahms' A German Requiem at Hamburg's Laeiszhalle, Bach's St Matthew Passion at the Vienna Konzerthaus and Frank Martin's Golgotha at the Graz Stefaniensaal.

=== Prizes and awards ===
Sander is the winner of the "Richard Tauber Prize" (London 2003) and was awarded the Lied Prize of the International Vocal Competition 's-Hertogenbosch 2002. Furthermore, he is a laureate of the "Internationaler Ada-Sari-Wettbewerb der Vokalkunst" in Poland 2001 and the Robert Schumann International Competition for Pianists and Singers (Zwickau 2000).

=== Discography ===
Various CDs have been released by Sander (Mahler: Lieder eines fahrenden Gesellen, Beethoven: IX. Symphonie, Fauré: Requiem, Handel: Judas Maccabaeus, Verdi: Requiem, Bach: cantata Ich habe genug). In 2013, together with the pianist Justus Zeyen, he released his debut solo album with Schubert's Schwanengesang and the Seidl Lieder op. 105. In 2016, another CD was released with Schubert's Die schöne Müllerin (with Sander's wife Uta Sander at the piano), which won the Supersonic Award and was nominated for the International Classical Music Awards. His 2017 album Das Lyrische Intermezzo (together with actor Cornelius Obonya and Uta Sander) was also nominated for the International Classical Music Awards, selected for the Austrian Airlines and Lufthansa in-flight programme and awarded the Bank Austria Art Prize.

=== Teaching activities ===
In addition to his active artistic career, Sander teaches singing at the University of Music and Performing Arts Vienna and is a sought-after lecturer for master classes (among others New England Conservatory of Music in Boston, University of Cartagena Colombia) and a juror at singing competitions (Ada Sari Competition Nowy Sacz / Poland). From 2020/21, Sander will take up a professorship for solo singing at the Hochschule für Musik Carl Maria von Weber in Dresden.
