= Martin Achrainer =

Austrian operatic bass-baritone

Martin Achrainer (born 1978) is an Austrian operatic bass-baritone.

== Life ==
Born in Kitzbühel, Achrainer comes from a farming family and first did an apprenticeship as a cook. Then he trained as an actor at the Max Reinhardt Seminar Vienna. He studied singing with Rotraud Hansmann at the University of Music and Performing Arts Vienna. His teachers included Brigitte Fassbaender, Irina Gavrilovici, Robert Holl and Charles Spencer.

From 2004, he was engaged for four seasons at the Tyrolean State Theatre, and since 2006 he has been in the ensemble of the Linzer Landestheater. There, he performed Count Almaviva, Don Giovanni, Leporello, Guglielmo, Papageno in Mozart's operas, Figaro in Rossini's Il barbiere di Siviglia, Dandini in La Cenerentola, Raimbaud in Le comte Ory, Marcello in Puccini's La Bohème and Nekrotzar in György Ligeti's Le Grand Macabre.

Achrainer has sung under renowned conductors such as Dietfried Bernet, Christoph Campestrini, Dennis Russell Davies, James Gaffigan, Kurt Masur, Marc Minkowski, Thomas Rösner, Reinhard Schwarz, Ralf Weikert. He has appeared at major festivals and concert halls, including the Bregenz Festival, the Brooklyn Academy of Music New York, the Bunkankaikan and Suntory Hall Tokyo, the Festival Hall Osaka, the Neue Oper Wien, the Salzburg Festival, the Stadt-Casino Basel and at the KKL Luzern. He sang the title role in the world premiere of the opera Kepler by Philip Glass. Composers such as Alexander Bălănescu, Rudolf Kelterborn, Kurt Schwertsik, Paul Engel, Ernst Ludwig Leitner and Ingo Ingensand have written for him.

In concert, he sang Glass, Henze, Kelterborn, Ligeti and Schwertsik as well as jazz-inspired music such as by Leonard Bernstein and Kurt Weill. Likewise, he was a performer in J. S. Bach's Passions and the great works of classical and romantic church music.

He worked with directors such as Brigitte Fassbaender, Isabella Gregor, Harry Kupfer, David Pountney, Olivier Tambosi and Jochen Ulrich.

== Awards ==
- Deutscher Darstellerpreis der Stiftung Doppelfeld bei den Festspielen Schloss Rheinsberg
- Robert Schumann International Competition for Pianists and Singers
- Hugo-Wolf-Preis Wien
- Gradus ad Parnassum
- Internationaler Hilde-Zadek-Gesangswettbewerb für Literatur des 20. Jahrhunderts Wien

== Recording ==
Achrainer can be heard on numerous international CD and DVD releases, radio and television recordings document the versatility of his musical work.
