= Frimmel =

Frimmel is a surname. Notable people with the surname include:

- Marek Frimmel (born 1992), Slovak football forward
- Rainer Frimmel (born 1971), Austrian director and photographer
- Sebastian Frimmel (born 1995), Austrian handball player
- Theodor von Frimmel (1853–1928), Austrian art historian, musicologist and Beethoven biographer
