= Unterreiner =

Unterreiner is a German surname. Notable people with the surname include:

- Clemens Unterreiner (born 1972), Austrian operatic baritone
- Heidemarie Unterreiner (1944–2025), Austrian politician

== See also ==
- Hans-Jörg Unterrainer (born 1980), Austrian snowboarder
