= Stephan Matthias Lademann =

German pianist

Stephan Matthias Lademann is a German pianist and academic teacher.

== Life ==
Born in Meißen, Lademann studied at the Hochschule für Musik Carl Maria von Weber Dresden and is predominantly active as Liedbegleiter. He accompanied Diana Damrau, Edita Gruberová, Paul Armin Edelmann, Mathias Hausmann, Sibylla Rubens, Chen Reiss, Günther Groissböck, Daniela Fally, Peter Schreier and Siegfried Jerusalem.

As a pianist, he has made guest appearances at many renowned festivals and stages: Alte Oper Frankfurt, Wiener Musikverein, KlangBogen Wien, Theater an der Wien, Schubertiade Vorarlberg, Rheingau Musik Festival, Schleswig-Holstein Musik Festival, Kissinger Sommer, Munich Opera Festival, Ludwigsburger Schlossfestspiele, Salzburg Festival, Semperoper Dresden, Berlin Philharmonie, Teatro de la Zarzuela Madrid, Auditorio Santiago de Compostela, Carnegie Hall New York and La Scala.

Various tours with Diana Damrau and Edita Gruberova have taken him to concert appearances at Wigmore Hall London, Staatsoper Unter den Linden, Laeiszhalle Hamburg and at the Philharmonie Luxembourg.

Since 2009, Lademann has concentrated on musical-literary projects, for example with actors such as Peter Matić, Sophie von Kessel, Ulrich Reinthaller and Angela Winkler. 2014 debuts during a tour with León de Castillo in Latin America at the Mexican State Opera Palacio de Bellas Artes and at the Sala Nezahualcóyotl in Mexico City. The music researcher Gerold Gruber organised a musical programme of exiled composers who were able to flee to Mexico, among them Marcel Rubin, Hanns Eisler, Egon Neumann, Paul Hindemith and Ruth Schönthal.

His discography includes a live recording of a concert at the Salzburg Festival with Diana Damrau in 2005, as well as Gustav Mahler's Des Knaben Wunderhorn in the original piano version.

He teaches at the University of Music and Performing Arts Vienna, correpeting among others in the Lied class of Robert Holl and his a juror of the International Johannes Brahms Competition.
