= Daniela Fally =

Austrian operatic coloratura soprano

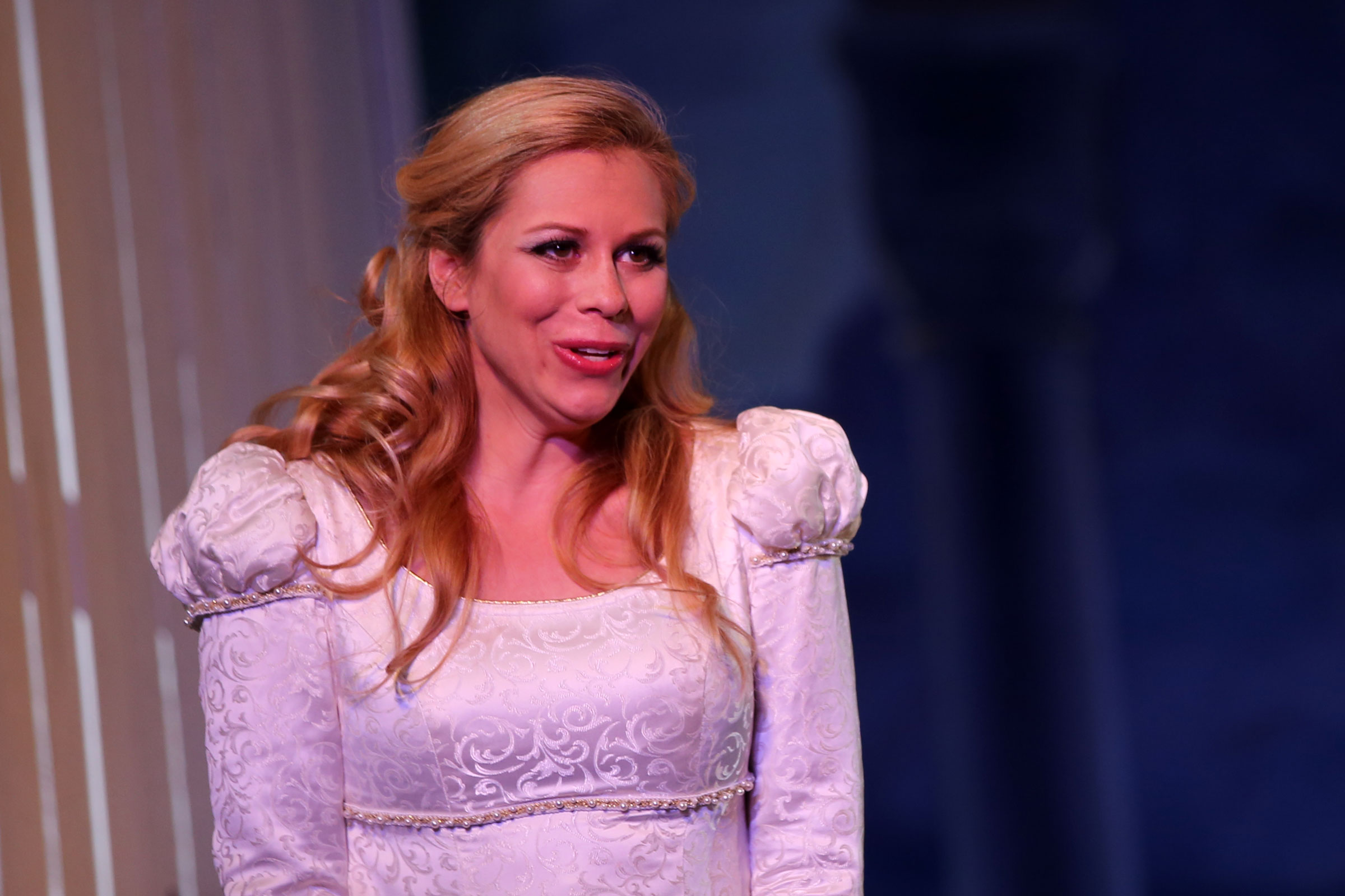
- Daniela Fally in 2015
- Born: 1 February 1980 (age 46); Pottenstein, Austria
- Occupations: Operatic soprano; Voice teacher
- Organizations: Vienna State Opera
- Title: Kammersängerin

Daniela Fally (born 1 February 1980) is an Austrian operatic coloratura soprano. Based at the Vienna State Opera, she has made an international career.

== Life ==
Born in Pottenstein, (Note: Year and place of birth are questionable. Although Austria-Info mentions Pottenstein in 1980, NEWS wrote on 19 December 2007 of "Daniela Fally, 29, born in Mödling". The artist's website reproduces this article without comment, but mentions neither year nor place of birth.) Fally first studied theatre studies and music pedagogy. She took private acting education, and passed a final stage examination with distinction. She then studied at the Vienna University of Music and Performing Arts Vienna, opera with Helena Łazarska and lied and oratorio with Edith Mathis, graduating with distinction in 2005.

Fally made her operatic debut as Zerlina in Mozart's Don Giovanni at Schloss Haldenstein in Chur, Switzerland, at age 21. In summer 2005, she appeared as Bronislawa in Millöcker's Der Bettelstudent at the Lehár Festival Bad Ischl. She became a member of the ensemble at the Vienna Volksoper from the 2005/06 season for four years, where she was able to develop an extensive repertoire in many genres. Franz Welser-Möst, who had seen her in Bad Ischl, engaged her as Fiakermilli in Arabella by Richard Strauss at the Vienna State Opera in 2006.

She performed as Zerbinetta in Ariadne auf Naxos by R. Strauss at the Stadttheater Klagenfurt in 2007. She became a member of the Vienna State Opera in the 2009/10 season, with roles including Zerbinetta, Sophie in Der Rosenkavalier by R. Strauss, Oscar in Verdi's Un ballo in maschera, Rosina in Rossini's Il barbiere di Siviglia, the Italian singer in Capriccio by R. Strauss, Sophie in Massenet's Werther, and Adele in Die Fledermaus by Johann Strauss. She appeared in the title role of Donizetti's La fille du régiment alongside Juan Diego Flórez. In 2012 she appeared as Sophie at the Semperoper in Dresden and the Opéra national du Rhin in Strasbourg.

At the Salzburg Festival, she participated in the inauguration of the new festival hall in 2012. She made her U.S. debut in 2013 as Adele at the Lyric Opera of Chicago. She performed as the Queen of the Night in Mozart's Die Zauberflöte on the lake stage of the Bregenz Festival in 2014. In 2015, Fally appeared at the Klosterneuburg Opera as Gilda in Verdi's Rigoletto, as Zerbinetta in Paris, and as Sophie in Tokyo. Her repertoire also includes Norina in Donizetti's Don Pasquale, Gretel in Humperdinck's Hänsel und Gretel, and Tytania in Britten's A Midsummer Night's Dream.

Concerts and recitals brought Fally to the Lucerne Festival, the Wiener Musikverein and the Musikverein für Steiermark in Graz, the Deutsche Oper Berlin, the Alte Oper in Frankfurt, the Salzburgarena, the Kongresshaus Innsbruck, the Hamburg Laeiszhalle, the Munich Prinzregententheater, the Theater Bonn, the Grafenegg Festival, as well as to Switzerland, Japan, China and Dubai. Oliver Ostermann composed the song cycle Von Vögeln und Insekten (Of birds and insects) for Fally, which she premiered at the Vienna Musikverein. She performed songs by Albin Fries at the Vienna State Opera with pianist Stephanie Houtzeel. The program of a Mother's Day matinee in 2012 in Waidhofen an der Ybbs with actor Peter Matić and pianist Stephan Matthias Lademann exemplifies how confidently the artist is able to combine serious commitment to classical music with comedic elements.

Fally has worked with conductors such as Bertrand de Billy, Christoph Eschenbach, Ádám Fischer, Asher Fisch, Fabio Luisi, Leopold Hager, Nikolaus Harnoncourt, Julia Jones, Philippe Jordan, Simone Young, Ulf Schirmer and Peter Schneider.

She performed in charity concerts such as the 2008 Opera Gala of the Deutsche AIDS-Stiftung, the 2012 AIDS Gala of the Oper Bonn and in 2012 and 2014 benefit concerts for the Hilfswerk Österreich.

Fally has been a voice teacher at the Richard Wagner Konservatorium in Vienna from 2019.

== Awards ==
- 2005 Universität für Musik und darstellende Kunst Wien, Würdigungspreis
- 2006 Eberhard Waechter Medaille
- 2021 Title of Austrian Kammersängerin
