= Amstetten, Lower Austria =

Amstetten
- City
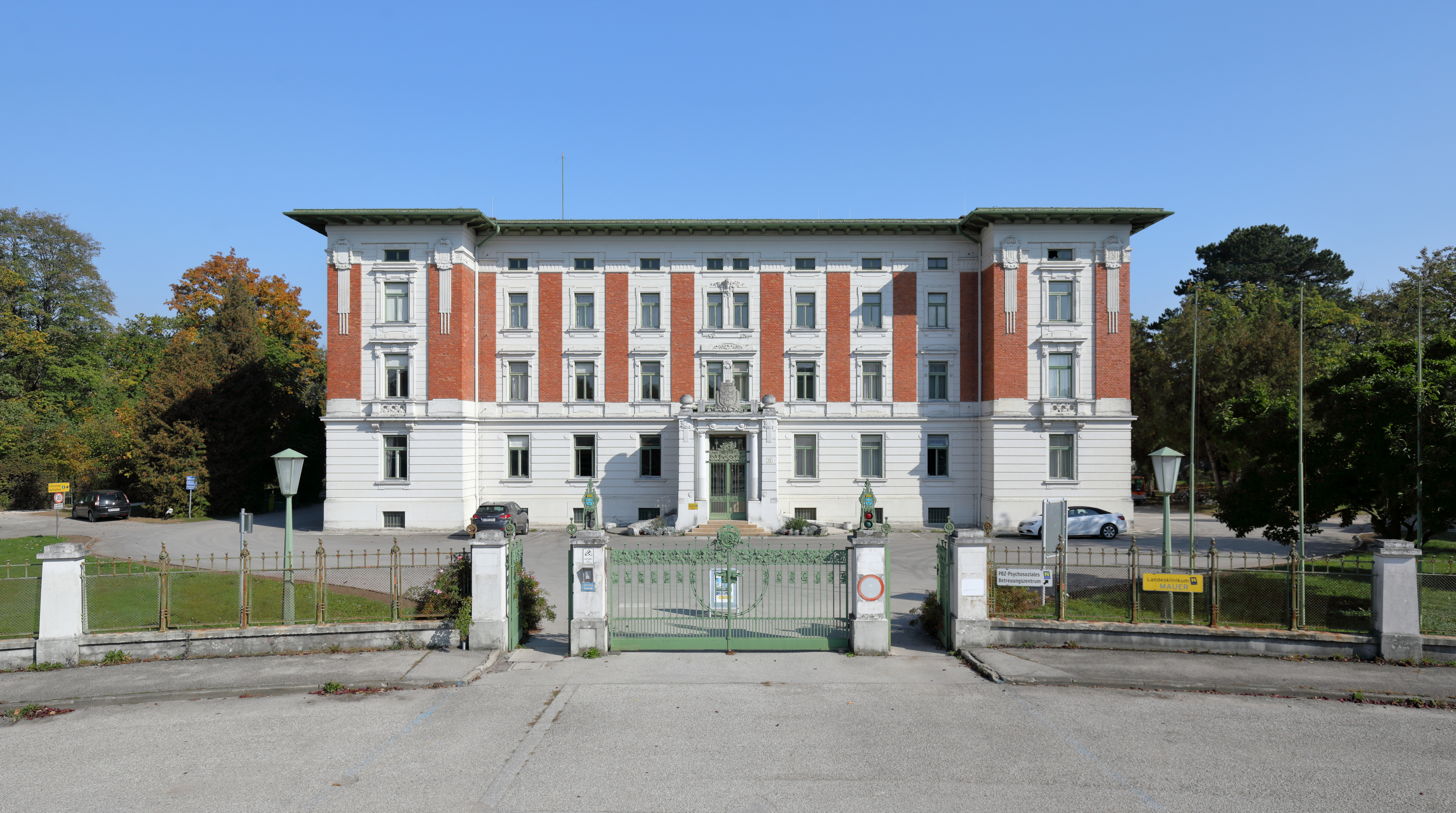
- Amstetten-Mauer hospital main building

- Coat of arms

- Location within Austria
- Coordinates: 48°07′N 14°52′E
- Country: Austria
- State: Lower Austria
- District: Amstetten

Government
  - Mayor: Christian Haberhauer (ÖVP)

Area
  - Total: 51.92 km^{2} (20.05 sq mi)
- Elevation: 275 m (902 ft)

Population (2018-01-01)
  - Total: 23,656
  - Density: 455.6/km^{2} (1,180/sq mi)
- Time zone: UTC+1 (CET)
  - Summer (DST): UTC+2 (CEST)
- Postal code: 3300; 3311; 3361; 3362; 3363
- Area code: 07472
- Vehicle registration: AM
- Website: www.amstetten.at

Amstetten (German pronunciation: [amˈʃtɛtn̩]) is a city in the state of Lower Austria in Austria. It is the capital of the Amstetten District and the centre of the historical region Mostviertel ("Most" – lightly fermented apple juice, "viertel" – a region of the province Lower Austria).

== Geography ==
Amstetten is situated between Linz (60 km; 40 miles) and Vienna (120 km; 75 miles) on the highway and just over an hour from Vienna by highspeed-train, and lies on the river Ybbs and Url as well near the Danube river.

It contains the City of Amstetten and the Amstetten boroughs of Mauer, Greinford (German: Greinsfurth), Prinebrook (German: Preinsbach), Elmsfield (German: Ulmerfeld), Hausmening and Newford (German: Neufurth).

== History ==
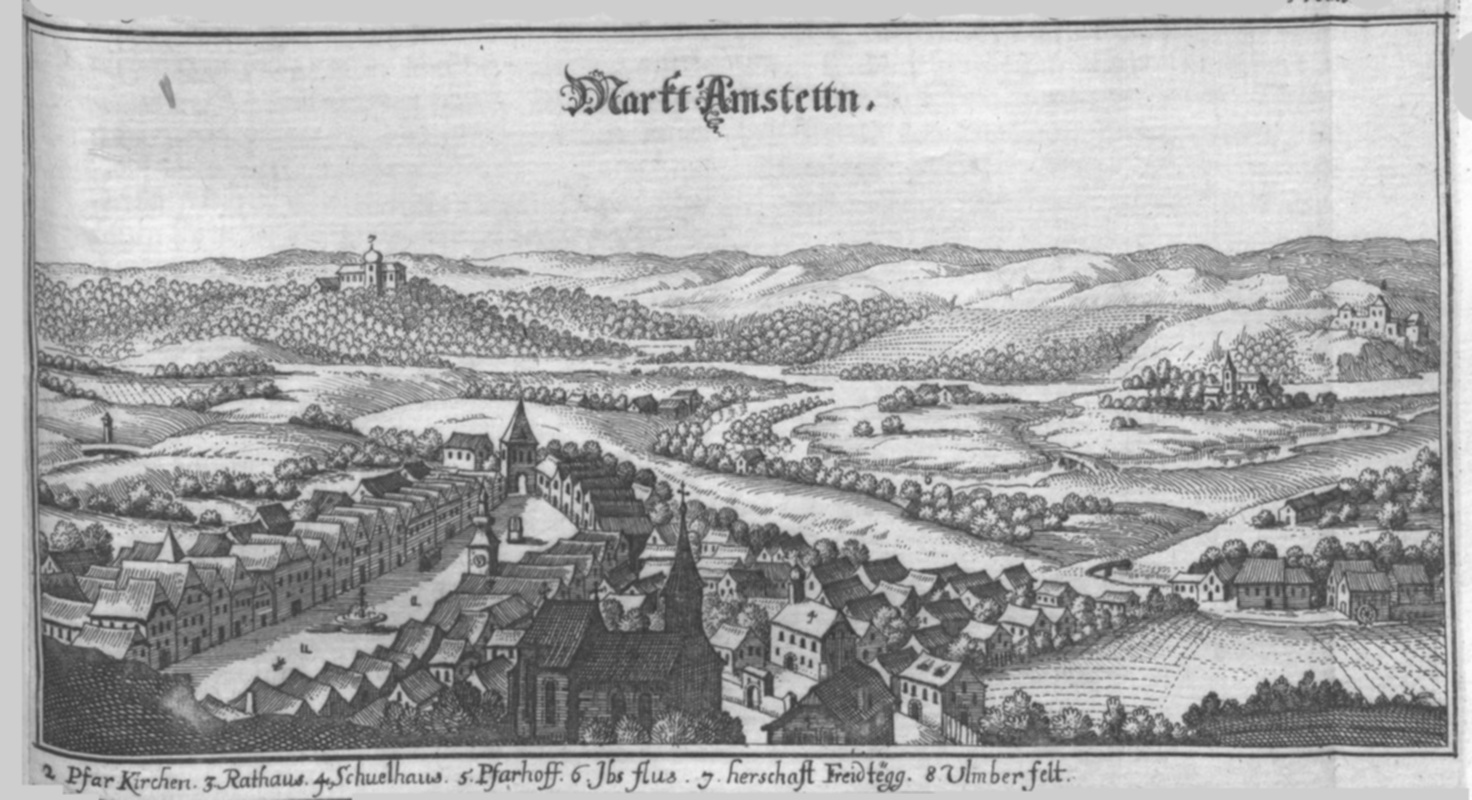
17th-century view of Amstetten

There are traces of human settlements from the Stone Age and the Bronze Age in the area. The first permanent settlement in the area to be mentioned in written sources was Ulmerfeld, mentioned in 995. The first mention of Amstetten itself is dated to 1111. In 1858, the town was linked to the rest of Austria-Hungary by railroad. Since 1868, it has also been the seat of the local district administration.

In 1938, it was annexed by Germany. During World War II, there were two subcamps of the Mauthausen-Gusen concentration camp in Amstetten, one for men, and one for women. Up to 3,500 people were imprisoned in the subcamps, including Poles, Jews, Greeks, French, Soviets, Hungarians, Belgians, Romanis, Sinti, Germans, Italians, Dutch, Czechs, Slovaks and Yugoslavs. There were also one British, American, Latvian, Norwegian, Romanian, and Spanish woman each. Many prisoners were killed during an Allied bombing of the town on 20 March 1945, as they were not allowed to enter the air-raid bunkers. After the defeat of Germany in the war, it was again part of restored independent Austria.

== Population ==
Historical population

Year	Pop.	±%
1869	4,313	—
1880	6,086	+41.1%
1890	7,254	+19.2%
1900	10,287	+41.8%
1910	14,415	+40.1%

Year	Pop.	±%
1923	14,715	+2.1%
1934	17,311	+17.6%
1939	18,574	+7.3%
1951	17,380	−6.4%
1961	19,086	+9.8%

Year	Pop.	±%
1971	21,695	+13.7%
1981	21,989	+1.4%
1991	21,972	−0.1%
2001	22,595	+2.8%
2011	22,948	+1.6%

Largest groups of foreign residents
Nationality	Population (2026)
Romania	1,171
Turkey	496
Syria	495
Afghanistan	270
Ukraine	229
Kosovo	215
Germany	206
Bosnia and Herzegovina	193
Hungary	171
Russian Federation	138
Serbia	115
Croatia	110
Poland	86
Slovakia	78
North Macedonia	71
Bulgaria	67
Czech Republic	34
Iran	28
Iraq	21
Italy	18
Slovenia	14

== Economy ==
The Doka Group, a major international producer/supplier of formwork, has their company headquarters in Amstetten.

== Schools ==
Amstetten has a variety of schools which cater to the needs of its residents, and residents of neighbouring villages. These include a Gymnasium, HLW Amstetten and HAK Amstetten. Language learning in Amstetten is enhanced greatly by the presence of English Language Assistants from the UK and USA, who also run regular extra-curricular events in the local area. There is also a vocational boarding school for technical professions and craftsman education.

== Sights ==
Old churches and chapels of Amstetten

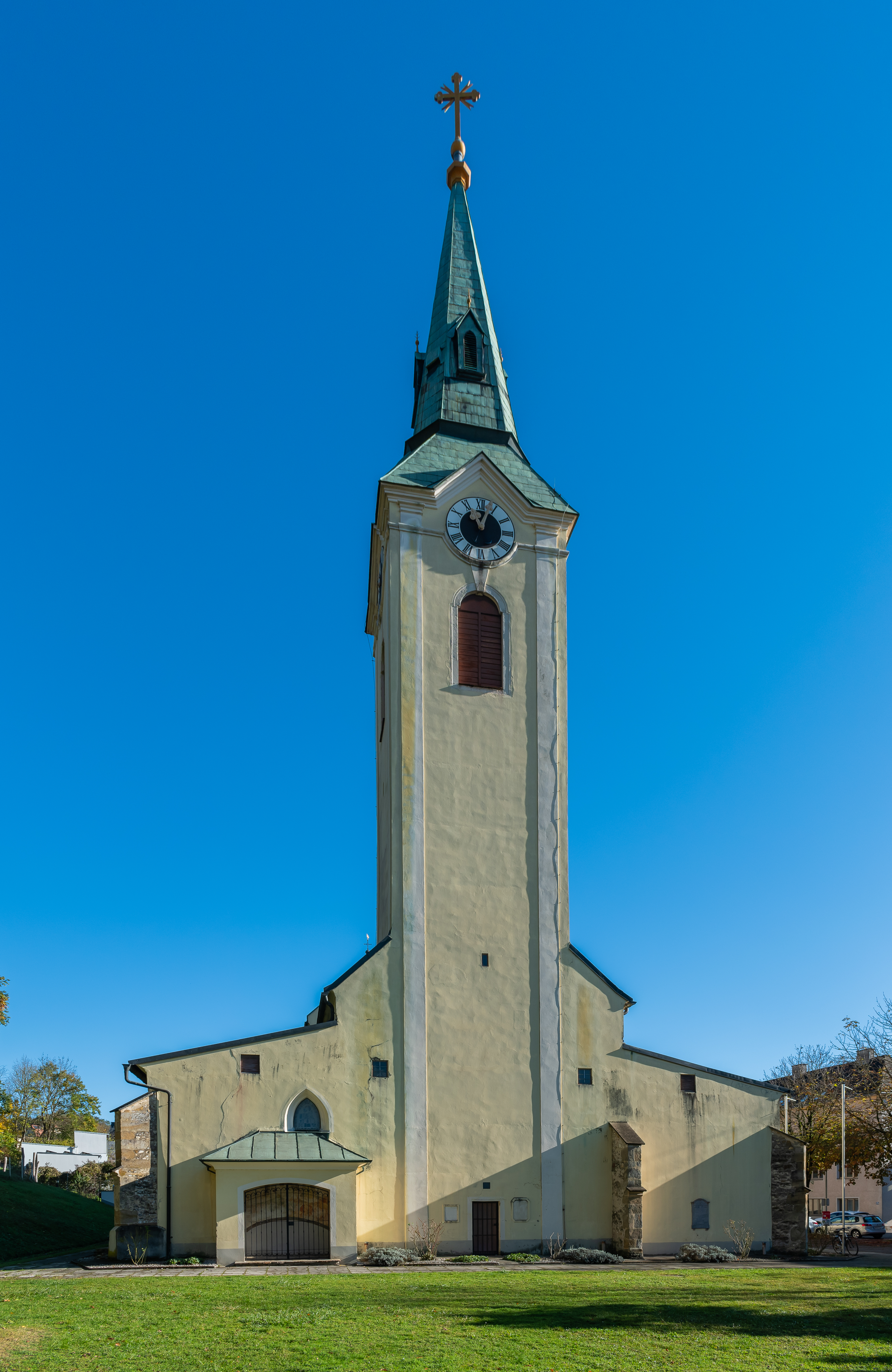
St. Stephen church

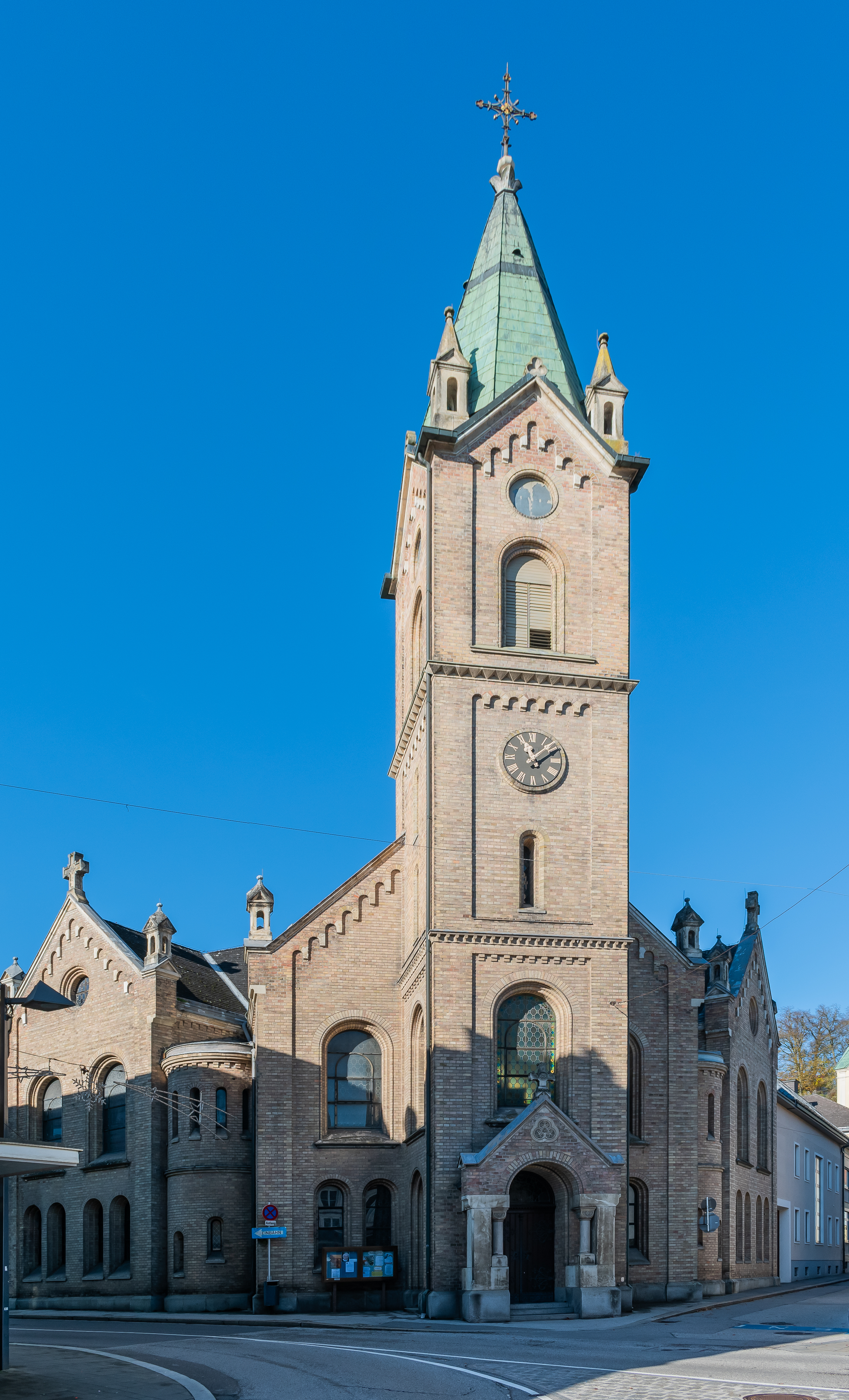
St. Francis church

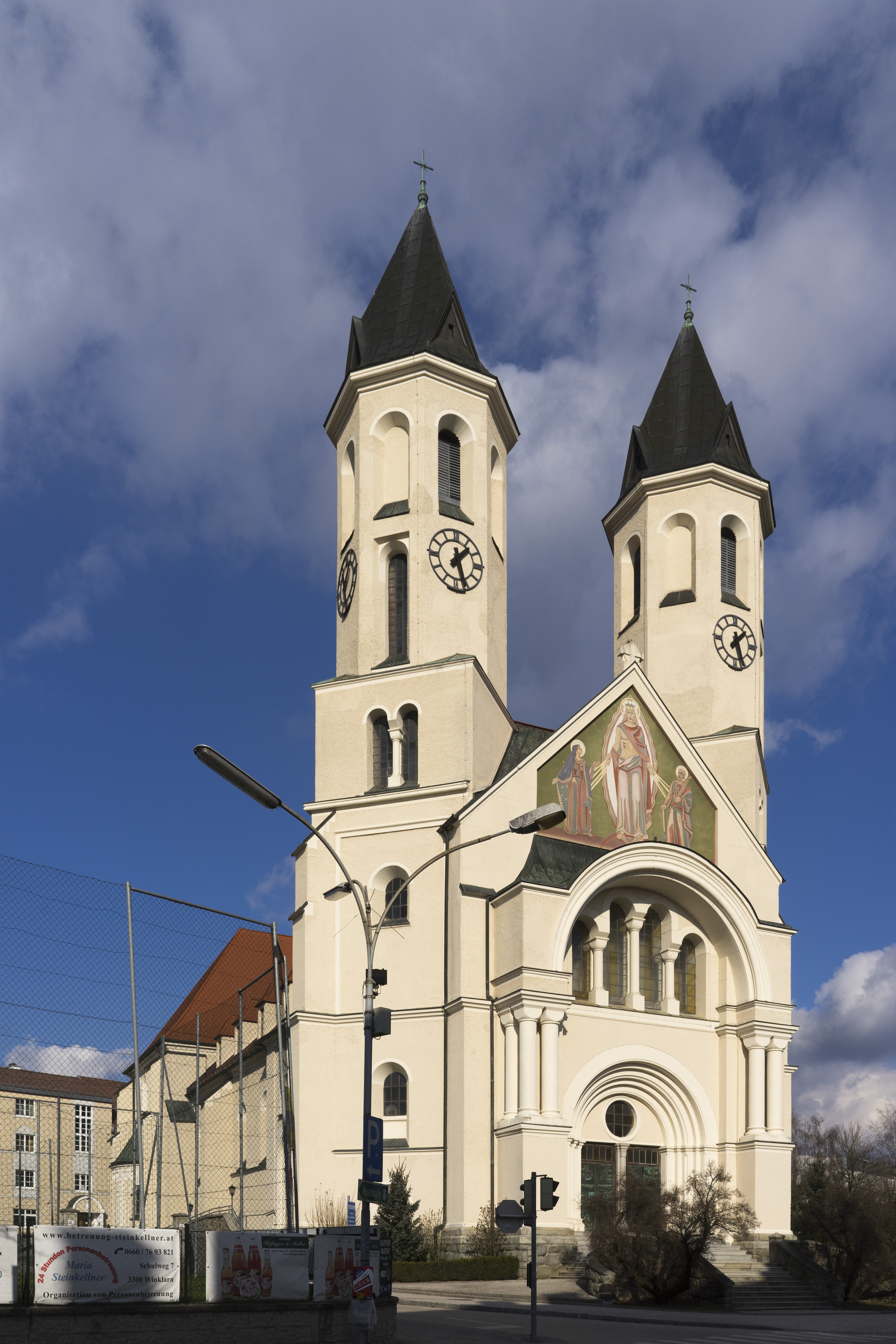
Sacred Heart of Jesus church

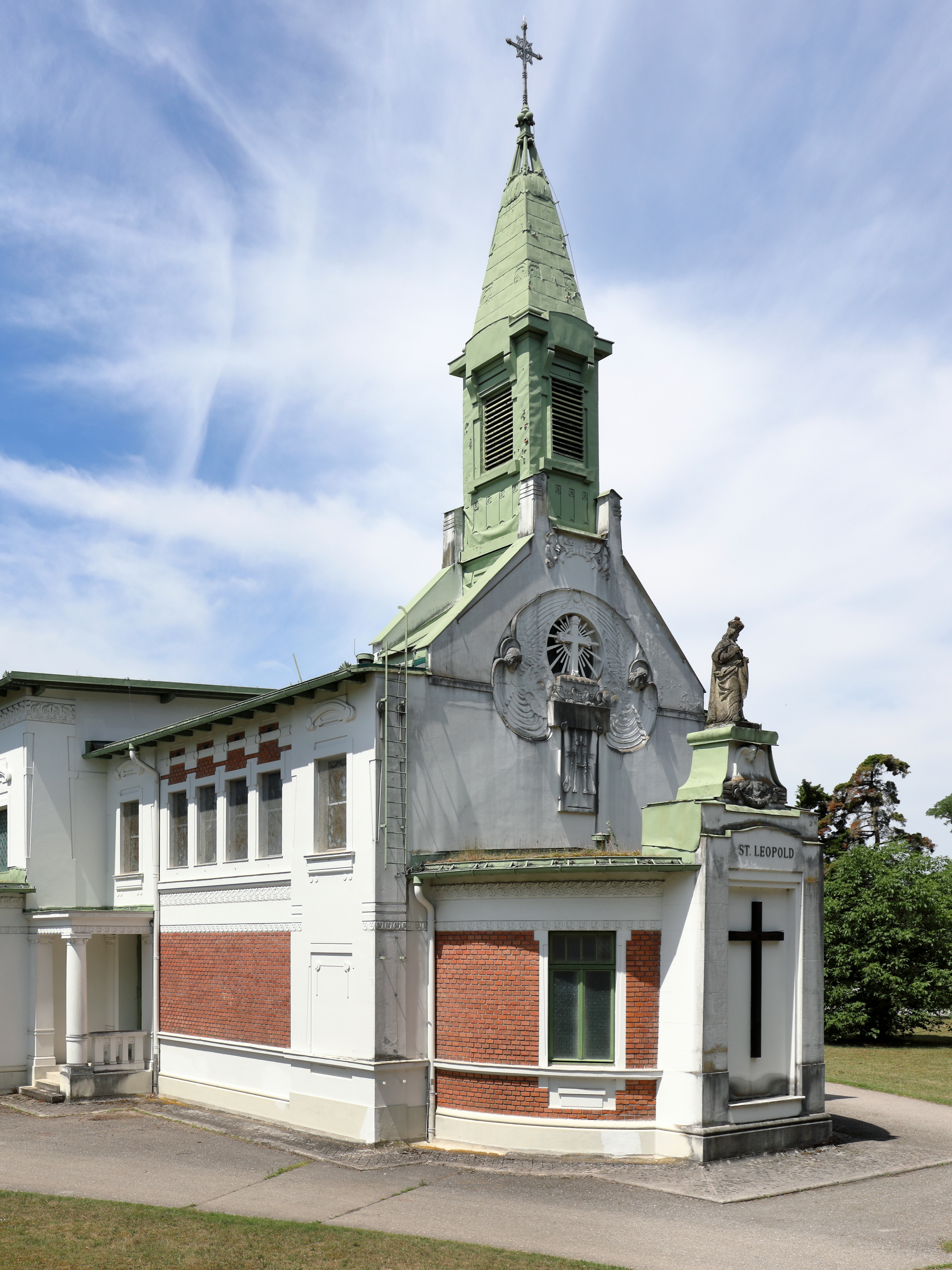
St. Leopold chapel

Amstetten has several churches. There is a small forest and a river for walking opportunities. There is an indoor and outdoor swimming pool, the 'Stadtbad', which offers attractions such as two slides, a current pool and its own park, the 'Uferpark'. There are several gyms in Amstetten as well as a dance and music school.

== Shopping ==
There is a shopping centre named CCA with clothes shops, shoe shops, a supermarket, technology shops and other amenities. Amstetten's high street has some clothes shops and several restaurants.

== Culture ==
Johann Pölz Halle is the local concert hall where school balls, theatre performances and concerts are held. Amstetten has an annual 'Kulturwochen', a series of weeks in Autumn dedicated to Culture. This includes performances from the Amstetten Symphony Orchestra and local Amateur dramatic groups, as well as professional theatre, cabarets, story-telling, lectures and exhibitions. In Winter, Amstetten has its own Christmas Market. In Summer, a summer musical theatre made of amateurs and professionals entertains in what is called 'Musicalsummer Amstetten'.

== Transport ==
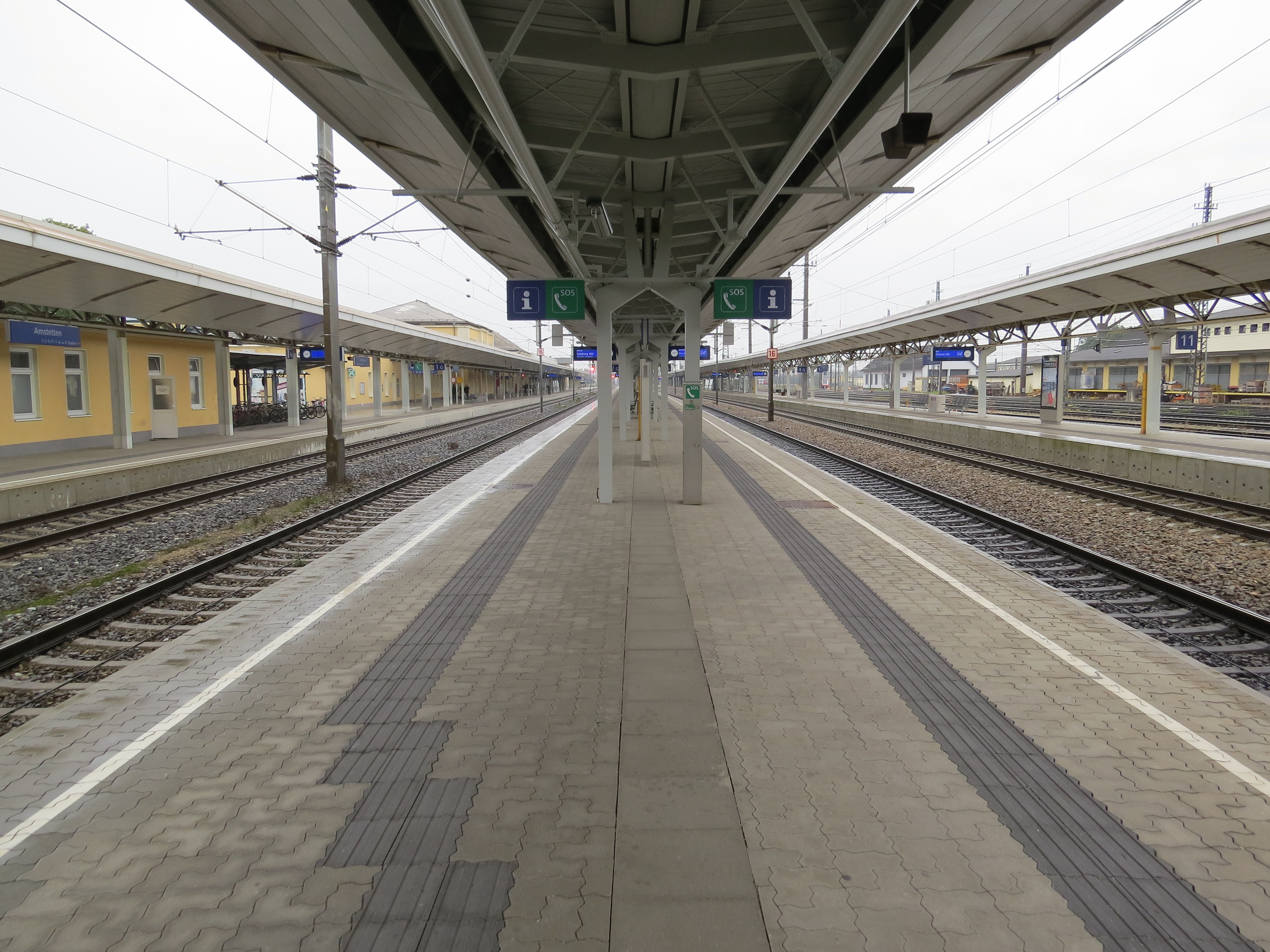
Railway station

Amstetten has a train station that is served by OEBB trains and the Westbahn trains. From the station, there are direct rail services to Vienna, Munich and Salzburg as well as local tourist attraction Melk.

== Twin towns – sister cities ==
Amstetten is twinned with:

- Alsfeld, Germany (1979)
- Ruelle-sur-Touvre, France (1992)
- Pergine Valsugana, Italy (1999)

== Notable people ==
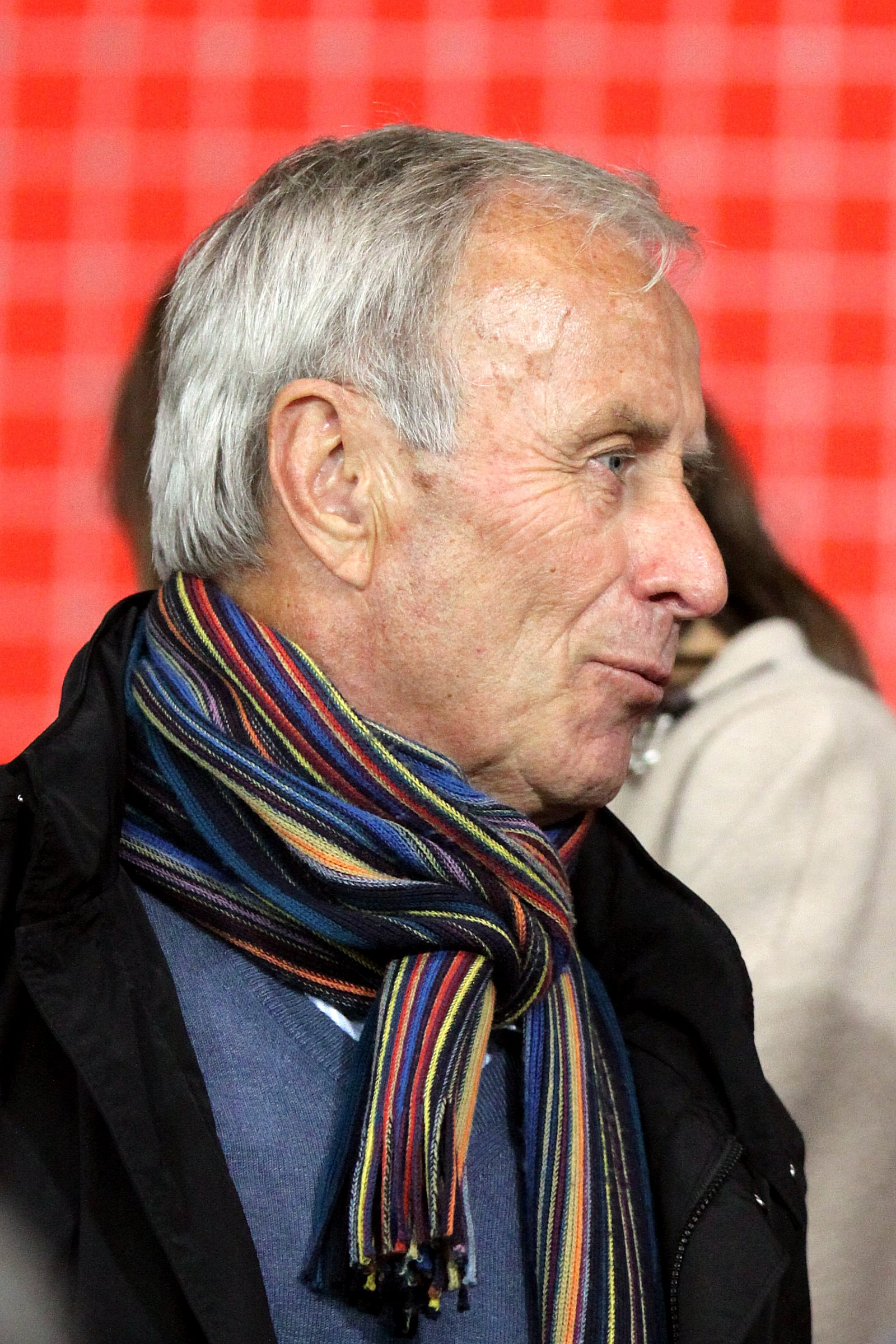
Josef Hickersberger, 2015

- Theodor von Frimmel (1853–1928), art historian, musicologist and Beethoven researcher
- Friedl Czepa (1898–1973), stage, film and television actress
- Josef Fritzl (born 1935), criminal, rapist and murderer; see Fritzl case
- Helene von Damm (born 1938), American diplomat, US Ambassador to Austria
- Margit Palme (1939–2025), painter
- Jochem Schindler (1944–1994), Indo-Europeanist
- Erwin Wagenhofer (born 1961), author and filmmaker
- Paulus Hochgatterer (born 1961), writer and psychiatrist
- Michael Garschall (born 1967), theatre director
- Georg Breinschmid (born 1973), bassist, composer and jazz musician
- Gernot Wagner (born 1980), climate economist and author

=== Sport ===
- Josef Hickersberger (born 1948), football player and coach, played 372 games and 39 for Austria
- Hermann Fehringer (born 1962), pole vaulter, holds the current Austrian record
- Michael Klukowski (born 1981), Canadian football player, played 417 games and 36 for Canada
- Daniel Kogler (born 1988), football player, played over 250 games
- David Peham (born 1992), an Austrian footballer who has played over 240 games
- Lukas Deinhofer (born 1994), an Austrian footballer who has played over 290 games
