= Isabella Gregor =

Austrian actress

Isabella Gregor (born in the 20th century) is an Austrian actress and theatre director.

== Career ==
Born in Vienna, Gregor comes from a family of musicians: her great-uncle is the conductor Bertil Wetzelsberger, her mother was the singer Sieglinde Wetzelsberger, her father the conductor Karl Österreicher and her cousin the conductor Franz Welser-Möst. She completed her acting training with Susi Nicoletti.

She had engagements as an actress at the Schauspielhaus Graz, the Landestheater Salzburg and the Burgtheater Vienna. She has appeared at the Salzburg Festival, the Wiener Festwochen, the Theater in der Josefstadt, the Volksbühne Berlin, the Nationaltheater Weimar, Schauspiel Frankfurt, Staatstheater Stuttgart and the Theater am Neumarkt in Zurich.

Since the 1990s, Gregor has worked as a director in drama and music theatre. In spoken theatre, she directed and adapted the German premiere of Oxygen by Carl Djerassi and Roald Hoffmann at the Mainfranken Theater Würzburg - with which she was nominated for the Bavarian Directing Prize and invited to various guest performances; she directed, among others. Critics by Arthur Schnitzler, Es by Karl Schönherr, Copenhagen by Michael Frayn, Lulu after Frank Wedekind, An Immaculate Misconception (Djerassi&Hoffmann, in Singapore), Torquato Tasso (Goethe), How to Hunt Hares (Georges Feydeau) and the world premiere of Kanari by Klaus Pohl, as well as the Austrian premiere of junk space by Kathrin Röggla.

In music theatre she directed the world premiere Kalkül by Werner Schulze (Studio of the Zurich Opera House), Heute Abend Lola Blau by Georg Kreisler at the Tiroler Festspiele Erl, various operettas at the Festival Herbsttage Blindenmarkt (Die Lustige Witwe, Das Feuerwerk, Orpheus in der Unterwelt, Der fidele Bauer, Im weißen Rössl) and Der Vogelhändler at the Lehár Festival Bad Ischl. She staged Mozart's Die Zauberflöte in 2014 as part of the Operklosterneuburg festival.

For one term she was a visiting dramatic teacher at Stanford University in the US.

From 2013 to 2015, Gregor was the artistic director of the Raimundspiele Gutenstein, which she staged with her production of Der Verschwender.
