= Marion Ammann =

Swiss soprano

Marion Ammann (born 30 July 1964), citizen of Herisau is a Swiss operatic and concert soprano.

== Life ==
Born in Zürich, Ammann studied singing at the Academy for School and Church Music in Lucerne from 1991 and privately in Zurich and Berne. At the Opera Studio Biel, she obtained her concert entrance qualification in opera in 1997. She sang her first roles as Lady Macbeth in Verdi's Macbeth and Leonore in Beethoven's Fidelio at the Theater Orchester Biel Solothurn. Her teachers were among others Kurt Widmer (Basel), Edith Mathis (Lucern) and Daniel Ferro (New York).

Ammann excelled above all in the Strauss and Wagner genres. She sang the Empress in Strauss' Die Frau ohne Schatten at the stages of Antwerp, Ghent, Graz, Karlsruhe, Saarbrücken and Helsinki, her Isolde in Wagner's Tristan und Isolde at a dozen German and Nordic stages. At the Operklosterneuburg, she was Leonore in Fidelio.

She has received various prizes and awards, including from the Migros and the cantons of Graubünden and Solothurn, and was a Bayreuth scholarship holder.

Ammann lives in Dornach near Basel.

== Repertoire ==
=== Operas and Operettas ===
- Leonore in Fidelio.
- Dorabella in Così fan tutte.
- Rosalinde in Die Fledermaus.
- Salome in Salome.
- Arabella in Arabella.
- Elsa von Brabant in Lohengrin.
- Senta in Der Fliegende Holländer.
- Isolde in Tristan und Isolde.
- Sieglinde in Die Walküre.

=== Concerts ===
- St Matthew Passion, BWV 244, Johann Sebastian Bach
- Symphony No. 9 in D minor op. 125, Ludwig van Beethoven
- Messe Nr. 3 in F minor (WAB 28), Anton Bruckner
- The Book with Seven Seals.
- Wesendonck Lieder.

== Recording ==
- DVD Der Ring des Nibelungen, Richard Wagner, Klassik-Center Kassel, 2011
