= Karina Flores =

Russian opera singer

- Born: Shakhty, Russia
- Other name: Karina Grigoryan
- Education: Rostov State Conservatory; Accademia Nazionale di Santa Cecilia
- Occupation: Opera singer (soprano)
- Years active: 1999–present

Karina Flores, also known as Karina Grigoryan, is a Russian opera singer who has sung leading soprano roles with companies in her native Russia as well as in other European countries. For eight seasons she was a soloist with Helikon Opera in Moscow and has gone on to sing at the Teatro Regio in Turin, the Teatro Filarmonico in Verona, the Teatro San Carlo in Naples, and the Tyrolean State Theatre in Innsbruck, amongst others. She made her American debut in 2018 as the soprano soloist in a performance of the War Requiem at the Kennedy Center conducted by Gianandrea Noseda. On disc Flores appears as Lisa in Israeli Opera's 2012 recording of Pique Dame conducted by Vladimir Jurowski.

== Life and career ==
Flores was born in the Russian city of Shakhty to parents of Armenian descent. She began her musical education at the conservatory in Shakhty and went on to study at the Rostov State Conservatory from 1999 to 2005. It was there that she made her stage debut in the title role of Madama Butterfly. In 2006 she continued her vocal studies in Moscow under Ruben Lisitsian and from 2008 to 2011 in Rome at the Accademia Nazionale di Santa Cecilia under Renata Scotto. During this time, she placed third in the 2008 Galina Vishnevskaya International Opera Singers Competition, and she continued her professional career singing with Helikon Opera in Moscow and on tour. In 2009, she was awarded first prize in the International Competition “Ottavio Ziino” (soprano category).

Flores was engaged as a soloist with Helikon Opera in 2006 and remained with the company for eight years. Her numerous roles with Helikon included Rosina in The Barber of Seville, Amelia in Un ballo in maschera, the title roles of Aida and Lady Macbeth of Mtsensk, and Stephana in Gordano's rarely performed Siberia. In 2012 she also made her debut with Israeli Opera as Lisa in Tchaikovsky's Pique Dame. The production, conducted by Vladimir Jurowski, was later released on CD and DVD. It was a role she would later reprise at the Heidenheim Opera Festival in 2019.

Between 2014 and 2019, Flores made a number of European house debuts, including Santuzza in Cavalleria rusticana at the Teatro San Carlo in 2014, Desdemona in Otello at the Teatro Filarmonico in Verona in 2018, and Leonora in Il trovatore at the Teatro Regio in Turin in 2018. She made her first appearance at the Tyrolean State Theatre in Innsbruck in 2015 in the title role of Adriana Lecouvreur for which she was nominated for the Österreichischer Musiktheaterpreis (Austrian Music Theatre Prize) in the "Best Female Lead" category. In later seasons she returned to the theatre as Amelia in Un ballo in maschera (2016) and as Angelica in Suor Angelica (2019).

Flores made her American debut in 2018 as the soprano soloist in a performance of Britten's War Requiem at the Kennedy Center conducted by Gianandrea Noseda. Her other concert appearances have included the soprano soloist in Brahms's German Requiem at the Teatro Regio in Turin conducted by Pinchas Steinberg in 2018 and the Mozart Requiem performed in Spain's Palma Cathedral in 2019.

Between 2021 and 2024, Flores made several notable appearances across European stages and concert venues, including her debut as Donna Leonora in La forza del destino at Oper Klosterneuburg in 2021, conducted by Christoph Campestrini and directed by Julian Roman Pölsler. In 2022, she performed in a symphonic concert featuring works by Shostakovich, Bizet, and Ernest Guiraud at the Perm Opera and Ballet Theatre conducted by Mihran Aghajanyan. The same season, she took on the title role in Aida at the Badisches Staatstheater Karlsruhe (2022–2023) conducted by Yura Yang and Johannes Willig and directed by Jasmina Hadziahmetovic. In 2023, she appeared as soprano soloist in Verdi's Requiem with the Kaunas City Symphony Orchestra, Lithuania, conducted by Constantine Orbelian and Algimantas Liaučius. She returned to Oper Klosterneuburg in 2023 and 2024 as Elisabetta di Valois in Don Carlo, conducted by Christoph Campestrini and directed by Günther Groissböck, with Monica I. Rusu-Radman joining the production in its 2024 revival. In 2024, Flores performed the title role in Bellini's Norma at Oper Klosterneuburg, directed by Monica I. Rusu-Radman and conducted by Christoph Campestrini.

== Repertory ==
Role	Opera	Composer
Lisa	Pique Dame	Pyotr Ilyich Tchaikovsky
Santuzza	Cavalleria rusticana	Pietro Mascagni
Stephana	Siberia	Umberto Giordano
Cio Cio San	Madama Butterfly	Giacomo Puccini
Soprano Soloist	War Requiem	Benjamin Britten
Soprano Soloist	Requiem	Wolfgang Amadeus Mozart
Suor Angelica	Suor Angelica	Giacomo Puccini
Floria Tosca	Tosca	Giacomo Puccini
Katerina Ismajlova	Lady Macbeth of Mtsensk	Dmitri Shostakovich
Amelia	Un ballo in maschera	Giuseppe Verdi
Elisabetta	Don Carlos	Giuseppe Verdi
Leonora	La forza del destino	Giuseppe Verdi
Desdemona	Otello	Giuseppe Verdi
Soprano Soloist	Requiem	Giuseppe Verdi
Aida	Aida	Giuseppe Verdi
Norma	Norma	Vincenzo Bellini
Tatyana	Eugen Onegin	Pyotr Ilyich Tchaikovsky
Adriana Lecouvreur	Adriana Lecouvreur	Francesco Cilea
Leonora	Il trovatore	Giuseppe Verdi
Contessa	The Marriage of Figaro	Wolfgang Amadeus Mozart
Rosina	The Barber of Seville	Gioachino Rossini
