= Clemens Unterreiner =

Austrian opera baritone (born 1972)

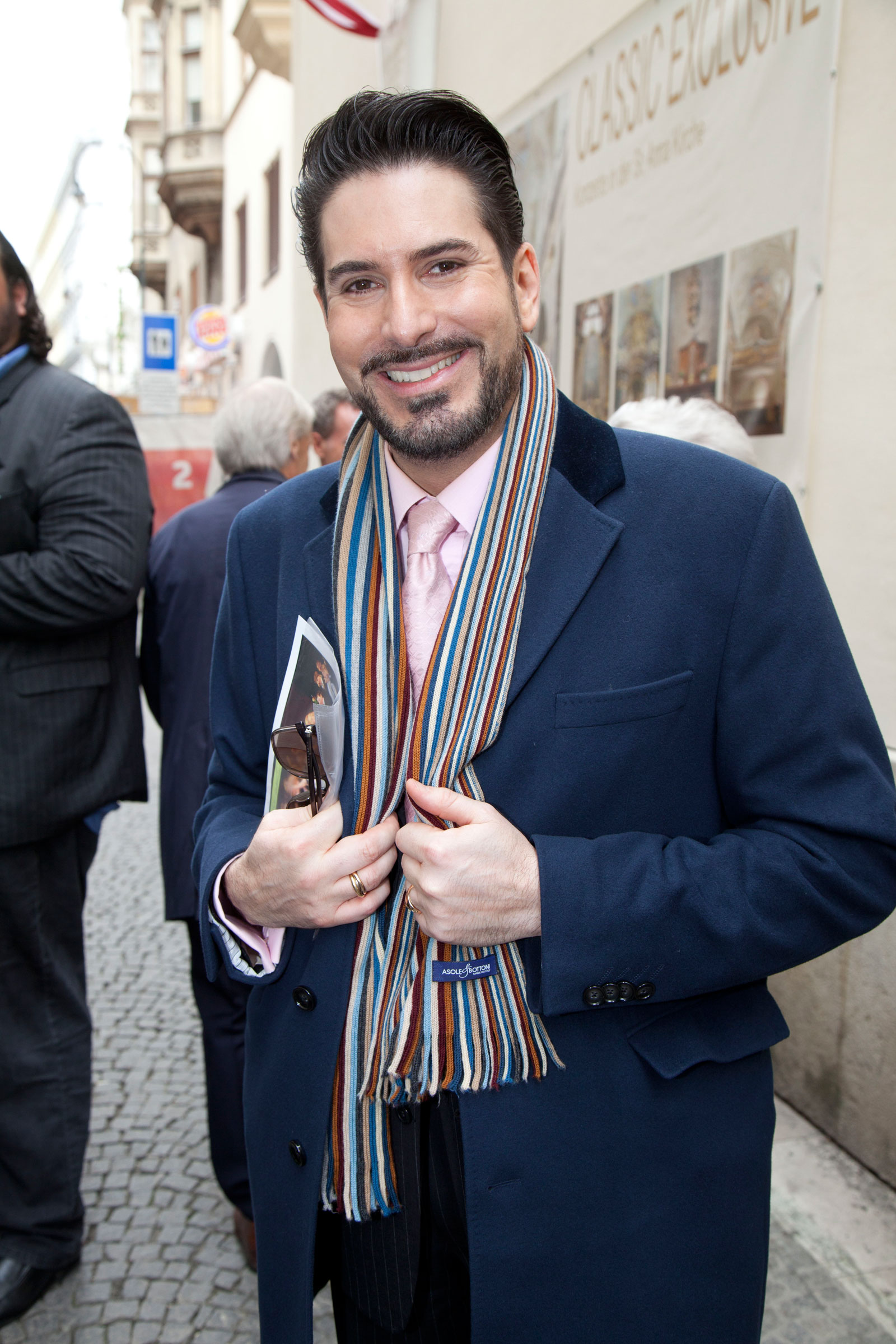
Image of Unterreiner Clemens

Clemens Unterreiner (born 18 March 1972) is an Austrian operatic baritone. He is professionally active internationally as well as a soloist and ensemble member of the Vienna State Opera. His operatic repertoire ranges from lyric to German-Italian-French cavalier and heroic baritone roles to masses, oratorios and classical Lieder, and also includes operetta and modern music.

== Life ==
Unterreiner grew up in Vienna where he was born, Graz and Budapest. At the age of 5 he went blind for 1 year and was able to slowly fight his way back to a sighted life in the following years. After the Matura at the Wiener Akademisches Gymnasium, he began studying law at the University of Vienna. He had his first musical experiences during his school years as a member of the choir and the drama group (Old Greek Theatre) of the Akademisches Gymnasium. From 1998, he took singing lessons with Hilde Rössel-Majdan and completed private singing studies with Rudolf Holtenau, Artur Korn, Gottfried Hornik, Helena Lazarska and Wicus Slabbert. Since 2005, he has been a soloist and ensemble member of the Vienna State Opera as well as a freelance international opera singer and singing teacher. His sister is the art historian Katrin Unterreiner.

== Career ==
He began his career with performances at the Vienna Festival, opera, operetta and church concerts. He undertook concert tours to Bulgaria, Syria, Italy, Spain, Germany, the US and Asia. He has performed in the Great Hall of the Wiener Musikverein, in the Wiener Konzerthaus and in the Palau de la Música Catalana – Barcelona.

In 2000, he was a scholarship holder of the Bayreuth Festival and in the following years participated in master classes with Bernd Weikl, Axelle Gall and Gottfried Hornik and Renate Holm. He was a semi-finalist at the 21st International Hans Gabor Belvedere Singing Competition in 2002 and was engaged from there to the "Linzer Landestheater", where he made his operatic debut in October 2002 in the European premiere of The Voyage by Philip Glass under the conduct of Dennis Russell Davies.

As a guest soloist, Unterreiner appeared at the Schärding Summer Opera, the Opera Festival Heidenheim, the Operklosterneuburg, the Hallstatt Mozart Festival and the Steyr Opera Festival as Bartolo (The Barber of Seville), Don Giovanni, Don Fernando (Fidelio), Guglielmo (Così fan tutte), Papageno (The Magic Flute) and Consul Sharpless (Madama Butterfly). He also worked with the Compagnia d'Opera Italiana di Milano, where he appeared as Consul Sharpless in a production of Madama Butterfly at 21 theatres in Europe, which was subsequently awarded the Music Theatre Prize of the 2004/05 season by the members of the Interest Group of Cities with Guest Theatre Performances INTHEGA.

In 2004, Unterreiner founded the Klassik Mania, an international opera singing competition for young singers in Vienna.

Since September 2005, Unterreiner has been engaged as a soloist and permanent ensemble member at the Vienna State Opera, where he has been cast in 14 premieres and revivals. He took on roles as Consul Sharpless, Lord of Faninal (Der Rosenkavalier), Donner (Das Rheingold), Harlequin (Ariadne auf Naxos), Grégorio (Roméo et Juliette), Meister Ortel (Die Meistersinger von Nürnberg), Schaunard (La Bohème), Antonio (Le nozze di Figaro), Brétigny (Manon) as well as Melot (Tristan and Isolde), Johann (Werther), Fleville (Andrea Chénier), Hortensius (La fille du régiment), Shchelkalov (Boris Godunov), Angelotti (Tosca), Baron Douphol (La traviata).

On 22 October 2008, he made his Vienna Folk Opera debut as Consul Sharpless in Puccini's Madama Butterfly and was heard as a guest soloist in the roles of Papageno, Morales (Carmen), the narrator (Die Zauberflöte) or Dr. Falke (Die Fledermaus) at the Volksoper Wien. In 2010, he sang there in the premiere of Rusalka.

In the summer of 2008, he was appointed Honorary Chamber Singer of Hohenberg due to his longstanding association and cultural activities in the local cultural association. In October 2008 he toured Asia with the Vienna State Opera production of Le nozze di Figaro among others in Shanghai, Seoul, Taipei, Singapore and Hong Kong. Unterreiner was vice-president of the Richard Wagner Association Vienna and scholarship representative for the Bayreuth scholarship from 2009–2011. In December 2010 he was invited to the Copenhagen Opera House and made a guest appearance there as Consul Sharpless in Madama Butterfly. In 2011, he appeared in the State Opera premieres of (La Traviata) and (From the House of the Dead) and in 2012 sang the role of Sparbüchsenbill in the premiere of (Rise and Fall of the City of Mahagonny). In April 2012, he made a guest appearance at Opera de Nice in Tristan und Isolde and as Papageno in The Magic Flute.

In 2012, he made his debut at the Salzburg Festival in the anniversary new production The Labyrinth by Peter von Winter in the role of Tipheus. In 2013, he sang Faninal in the gala performance of der Rosenkavalier at the new Musiktheater Linz for the opening of the new opera house in Linz and celebrated his role debut as Wolfram in Wagner's Tannhäuser at the Richard Wagner Festival Wels on 17 May. In 2014, he had his role debut as Telramund in Wagner's Lohengrin at the Richard Wagner Festival Wels. In 2015, he made his Japan debut as Herr von Faninal in Strauss' Der Rosenkavalier at the New National Theatre Tokyo. and sang for the first time at Carnegie Hall. in New York.

In 2016, he became the first Austrian baritone in 34 years to sing Escamillo in Carmen at the Vienna State Opera. and debuted as Telramund in Wagner's Lohengrin at the Royal Opera House Muscat.

On 12 May 2016, his autobiography Ein Bariton für alle Fälle was published at Amalthea Signum Verlag.

On 7 November 2017, his first CD Christmas with Clemens Unterreiner was released by GRAMOLA.

On 7 July 2018, he made his debut as Valentin in the premiere of the opera Faust by Charles Gounod at the Savonlinna Opera Festival in Finland.

In the summer of 2018, he taught for the first time as a professor of voice at the "Vienna Music Seminar" at the University of Music in Vienna.

In February 2019, he sang exclusively for the King and Queen of Sweden, Carl XVI Gustaf and Queen Silvia in the course of the FIS Nordic World Ski Championships 2019 in Seefeld/Tyrol.

During the 2020 COVID-19 pandemic and during the lockdown in Austria, he was involved in various initiatives for music, art and culture, singing as part of "Wir spielen für Österreich" diverse Konzerte und Opernvorstellungen for the ORF.

== Social commitment ==
Since he himself was blinded by an eye disease as a child and only after lengthy treatments was it possible to overcome his disability, Unterreiner has been regularly involved in charitable organisations and projects at home and abroad. Since December 2013, Unterreiner has been president of the association HILFSTÖNE – Music for People in Need. He is furthermore consul of the Austrian Red Cross Ambassador of the BSVÖ Blinden- und Sehbehindertenverband Österreich. Sponsor of the action space Hilfswerk Österreich and also supports Volkshilfe Österreich, CS Hospiz Rennweg, Kinder Krebs Hilfe, "Österreichischer Kinderschutzpreis" and many other charitable organisations through his artistic, media work and donations. In the wake of the Corona Crisis cultural lockdown, Unterreiner got involved with his HILFSTÖNE artist aid and the HILFSTÖNE MASK for artists in need.

== Repertoire ==
- Don Giovanni, Masetto in Don Giovanni (W. A. Mozart)
- Don Fernando, Don Pizarro in Fidelio (Ludwig van Beethoven)
- Guglielmo in Così fan tutte (W. A. Mozart)
- Papageno, Sprecher in Die Zauberflöte (W. A. Mozart)
- Sharpless in Madama Butterfly (Giacomo Puccini)
- Herr von Faninal in Der Rosenkavalier (Richard Strauss)
- Donner in Das Rheingold (Richard Wagner)
- Gunther in Götterdämmerung (Richard Wagner)
- Musiklehrer, Harlekin in Ariadne auf Naxos (Richard Strauss)
- Grégorio in Roméo et Juliette (Charles Gounod)
- Kothner, Ortel in Die Meistersinger von Nürnberg (Richard Wagner)
- Marcello, Schaunard in La Bohème (Giacomo Puccini)
- Conte Almaviva, Antonio in Le nozze di Figaro (W. A. Mozart)
- Lescaut, Brétigny in Manon (Jules Massenet)
- Kurwenal, Melot in Tristan und Isolde (Richard Wagner)
- Albert, Johann in Werther (Jules Massenet)
- Gérard, Fleville in Andrea Chénier (Umberto Giordano)
- Sulpice, Hortensius in La fille du régiment (Gaetano Donizetti)
- Schtschelkalov in Boris Godunov (Modest Mussorgski)
- Angelotti, Scarpia in Tosca (Giacomo Puccini)
- Germont, Barone Douphol in La traviata (Giuseppe Verdi)
- Escamillo, Morales in Carmen (Georges Bizet)
- Eisenstein, Dr. Falke in Die Fledermaus (Johann Strauss II)
- Der Heger in Rusalka (Antonín Dvořák)
- Sparbüchsenbill in Aufstieg und Fall der Stadt Mahagonny (Kurt Weill)
- Tipheus in Das Labyrinth (Peter von Winter)
- Wolfram in Tannhäuser (Richard Wagner)
- Telramund, Heerrufer in Lohengrin (Richard Wagner)
- Verschinin in Tri Sestri (Péter Eötvös)
- Vater in Hänsel und Gretel (Engelbert Humperdinck)
- Tonio, Silvio in Bajazzo / Pagliacci (Ruggero Leoncavallo)
- Mandarin in Turandot (Giacomo Puccini)
- Belcore in L'elisir d'amore (Gaetano Donizetti)
- Geisterbote in Die Frau ohne Schatten (Richard Strauss)
- Valentin in Faust (Charles Gounod)

== Discography ==
- Weihnachten mit Clemens Unterreiner
- Das Städtchen Drumherum (Elisabeth Naske)
- Werther (Jules Massenet)
- Das Labyrinth (Peter von Winter)
- Die Meistersinger von Nürnberg (Richard Wagner)
- La fille du régiment (Gaetano Donizetti)
- Moses und Aron (Arnold Schoenberg)
- Capriccio (Richard Strauss)
- La fanciulla del West (Giacomo Puccini)
- Arabella (Richard Strauss)

== Awards ==
- ASTORIA Botschafter 2018–2019
- Die goldene TARA in the "Karitatives Engagement" category
- Konsul des Wiener Roten Kreuzes
- Honorary member of the "Ballettclub Wiener Staatsoper & Volksoper"
- The Silver Badge of Honour of the Austrian Association for the Blind and Visually Impaired for his social, charitable commitment as an ambassador of the BSVÖ
- Die HILMA 2015 des "Hilfswerk Österreich" für sein soziales, karitatives Engagement
- Ambassador of the "Blinden- und Sehbehindertenverband Österreich" for his social, charitable commitment to blind and visually impaired people
- Honorary Member of the Gesellschaft Österreich Ungarn
- 2023 Austrian Kammersänger
