= Anno Schreier =

German composer (born 1979)

Anno Schreier (born 1979 Aachen) is a German composer.

== Works ==
- Der Herr Gevatter (2004).
- Kein Ort. Nirgends (2006). Opera after Christa Wolf.
- Wunderhorn (2008). Song cycle
- Hinter Masken (2008)
- Die Stadt der Blinden (2011). Opera after the novel by José Saramago.
- Hamlet (2016). Premiere at Theater an der Wien
- Schade, dass sie eine Hure war (2016–2018). Opera after John Ford.
- Turing, two-act opera with libretto by Georg Holzer. Premiere 26 November 2022 at the Nürnberg Staatstheater, conducted by Guido Johannes Rumstadt with Martin Platz in the title role.
