= Theodor von Frimmel =

Theodor von Frimmel, fully Theodor von Frimmel-Traisenau (15 December 1853 – 3 December 1928), was an Austrian art historian, musicologist and Beethoven biographer. He was born in Amstetten and eventually settled in Vienna, where he died.

== Biography ==
Theodor von Frimmel was born in Amstetten, Lower Austria. He was assistant curator at the Imperial Natural History Museum (Hofmuseum) of Vienna until 1893, later taught art history at the Vienna Athenäum and was director of a gallery. He is mainly remembered as a musicologist for essays on Beethoven's work, life and images.

== Works ==
- Beethoven und Goethe: eine Studie, 1883
- Neue Beethoveniana, 1888
- Ludwig van Beethoven, 1901
- Beethoven-Studien, München, Georg Müller 1905–1906, (2 vols.)
- Bemerkungen zur angeblich "kritischen" Ausgabe der Briefe Beethovens, Wien, 1907
- Beethoven-Jahrbuch, only 1908/1909
- Beethoven-Briefe, 1910–1911, (5 vols.)
- Beethoven im zeitgenössischen Bildnis. Wien, König 1923
- Neuausgabe des Beethovens-Werkverzeichnisses von G. Nottebohm/Th. v. Frimmel (new list of Beethoven's work), Leipzig, Breitkopf & Härtel 1925
- Beethoven-Handbuch, 2 vols., 1926
