= Christoph Campestrini =

Austrian conductor (born 1968)

Christoph Campestrini (born 1968) is an Austrian conductor.

== Life and work ==
Born in Linz Campestrini's international concert and opera career has taken him to orchestras such as the London Symphony Orchestra, Tchaikovsky RSO Moscow, Deutsches Symphonie-Orchester Berlin, RSO Frankfurt, Mozarteumorchester Salzburg, RSO Vienna, Orchestre National du Capitole de Toulouse, Royal Seville Symphony Orchestra, RSO Prague, RSO Budapest, National Symphony Orchestra of Mexico, the Cairo Symphony Orchestra, the Seoul Philharmonic Orchestra, the National Symphony Orchestra (Taiwan) and many others.

He has worked regularly for several years in the US and Canada, where he has conducted the Philadelphia Orchestra, the Houston Symphony, the Detroit Symphony, the Indianapolis Symphony, the Florida Orchestra, the Vancouver Symphony, the National Arts Centre Orchestra Ottawa and the Orchestre Symphonique de Quebec, among others.

Campestrini was appointed Kapellmeister of the Wiener Hofmusikkapelle in 2016, for the performance of sacred music with the Vienna Philharmonic, the Vienna Boys' Choir and the Herrenchor of the Vienna State Opera. He is musical director of the Klosterneuburg Opera on the outskirts of Vienna and Principal Guest Conductor of the International Late Summer Mu sic Festival Dubrovnik.

As an opera conductor, Campestrini was 1st Kapellmeister at the renowned Aalto Theatre in Essen in over 100 performances. He has also conducted at the Teatro Regio (Turin), the Teatro Lirico di Cagliari, the Deutsche Oper am Rhein, the Minnesota Opera, the Opera de Montreal, the Edmonton Opera and Sakai City Opera Osaka in Japan. Among the international soloists with whom he has worked are Lang Lang, Maxim Vengerov, Gidon Kremer, Julian Rachlin, Sharon Kam and Julia Fischer.

Campestrini studied conducting, composition, philosophy and languages in New York at the Juilliard School and Yale University and, in addition to his conducting activities, is also active as a pianist and composer of Lieder cycles, symphonic works and chamber music.

In 2005, he conducted the Naumburg Orchestral Concerts, in the Naumburg Bandshell, Central Park, in the summer series.

== Recordings ==
- Hans Rott: Symphony in E major with the Philharmonia Hungarica
- Mendelssohn, Mozart: Double Concertos with the Brno Philharmonic Orchestra
- Hadyn, Rosetti, Hoffmeister: Hunting Symphonies with the Chamber Orchestra of the Vienna Volksoper
- Casella: Organ Concerto with the Brandenburg State Orchestra Frankfurt
