= Markus Werba =

Austrian baritone opera singer (born 1973)

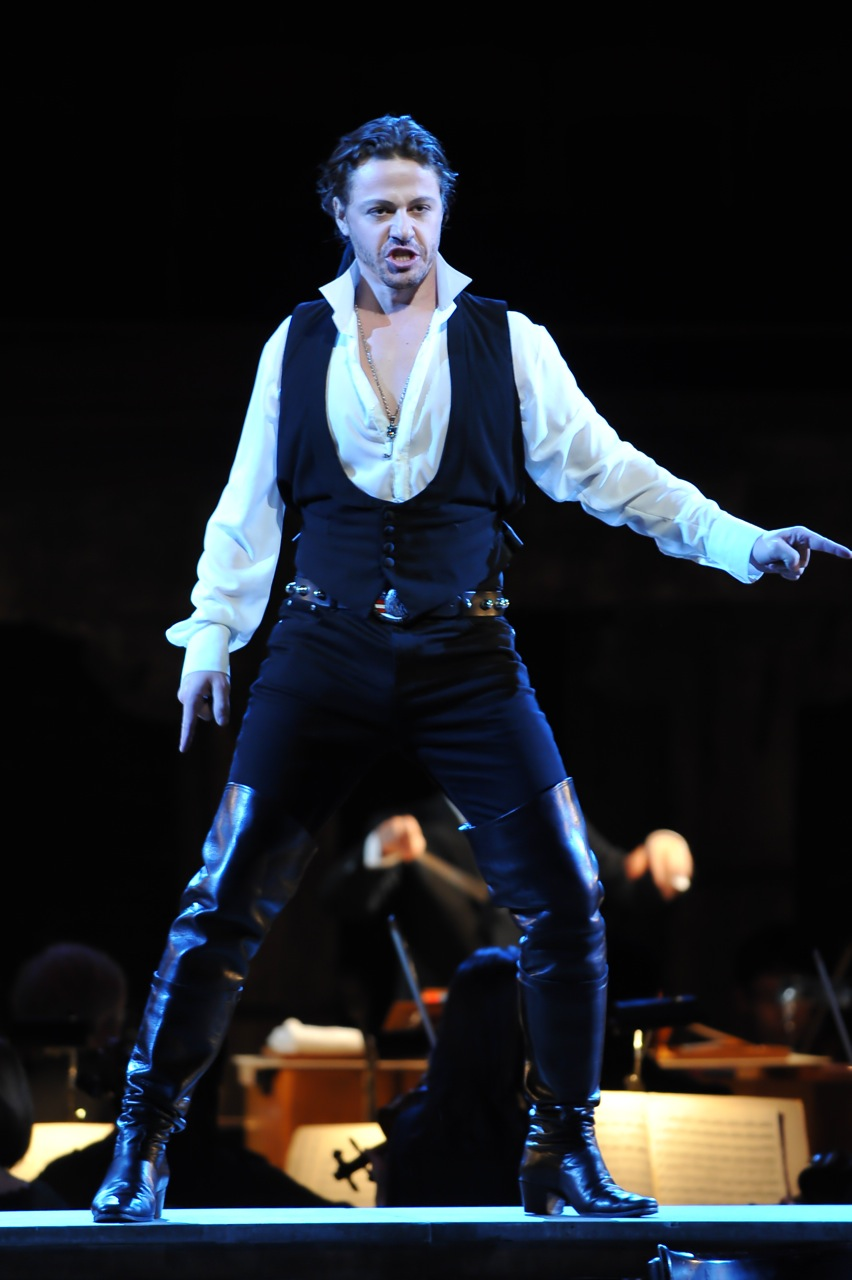
- Werba performing at Suntory Hall in 2009
- Born: Markus Paul Werba; 14 November 1973 (age 52)
- Occupation: Opera singer (baritone)

Markus Werba (born 14 November 1973) is an Austrian baritone opera singer.

== Biography ==
Born in Hermagor Carinthia, Austria, Werba began his vocal training aged 16. He studied at the Conservatory of Klagenfurt and University of Music and Performing Arts, Vienna with Ralf Doering, Robert Holl and Walter Berry. He has won numerous competitions for his singing in Austria, Italy, Japan, Slovakia and the UK. He was chosen as Guglielmo in 1997 (Così fan tutte) for the inauguration of the Nuovo Piccolo Teatro in Milan by Giorgio Strehler.

After his debut in Milan he sang in all major opera houses.

== Operatic repertoire ==
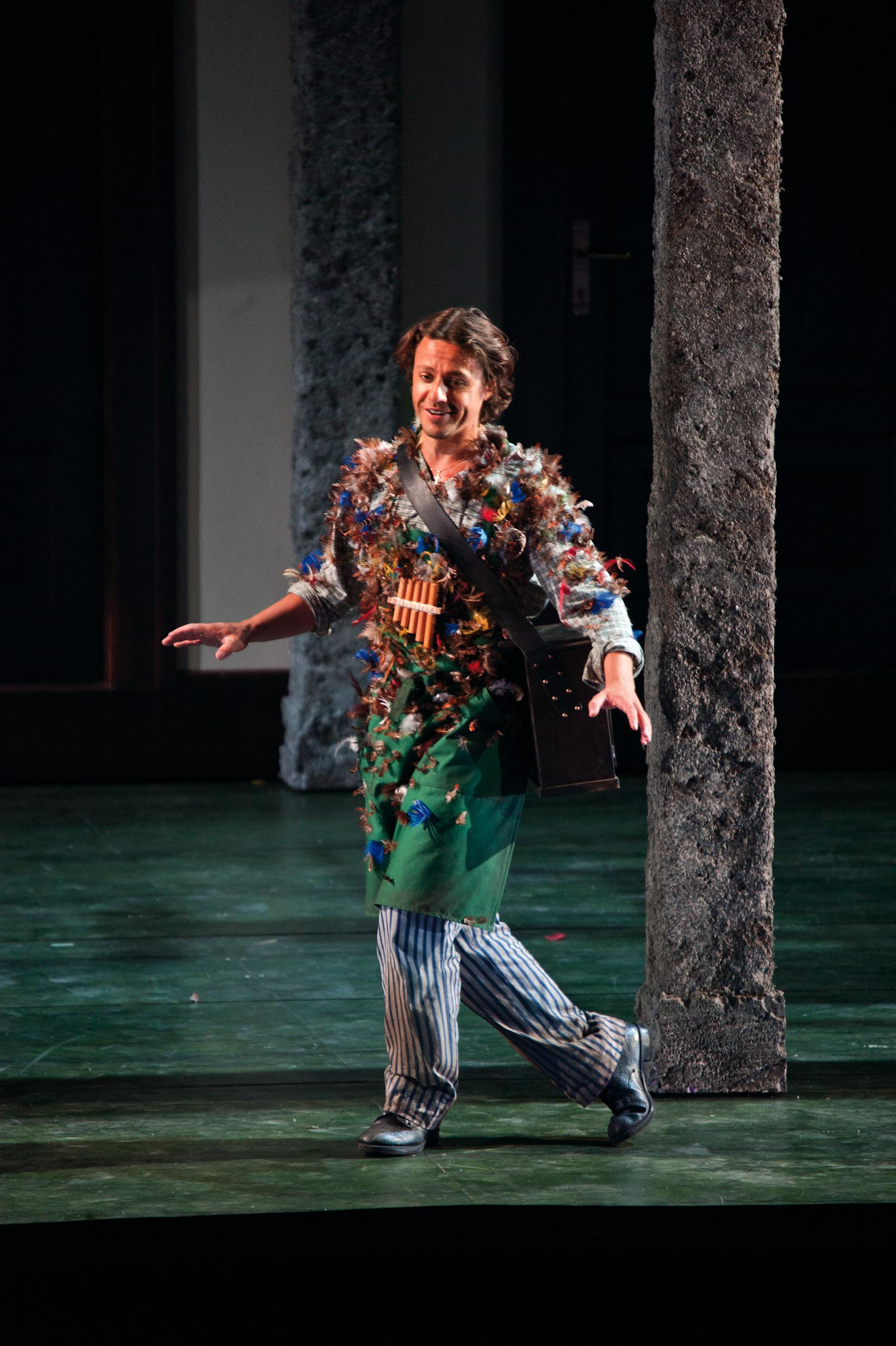
Werba appearing as Papageno in Mozart's The Magic Flute at the 2012 Salzburg Festival.

Bellini

- Sir Riccardo Forth (I puritani)

Braunfels

- Wiedehopf (Die Vögel)

Britten

- Billy Budd (Billy Budd)
- Demetrius (A Midsummer Night's Dream)

Cavalli

- Mercurio (La Calisto)

Debussy

- Pelléas (Pelléas et Mélisande)

Donizetti

- Don Alfonso (La favorita)
- Malatesta (Don Pasquale)
- Belcore (L'elisir d'amore)
- Lord Enrico Ashton (Lucia di Lammermoor)

Korngold

- Frank-Fritz (Die tote Stadt )

Lehàr

- Danilo (Die lustige Witwe)

Marschner

- Hans Heiling (Hans Heiling)

Massenet

- Athanaël (Thaïs)

Mozart

- Papageno (The Magic Flute)
- Guglielmo / Don Alfonso (Così fan tutte)
- Don Giovanni (Don Giovanni)
- Figaro / Il Conte (Le nozze di Figaro)
- Nardo (La finta giardiniera)

Rossini

- Figaro (Il barbiere di Siviglia)
- Dandini (La Cenerentola)

Thomas

- Hamlet (Hamlet)

Tchaikovsky

- Eugene Onegin (Eugene Onegin)

Paisiello

- Giorgino (Il matrimonio inaspettato)

Puccini

- Marcello (La bohème)

Schubert

- Froila (Alfonso und Estrella)

Schumann

- Faust, Pater Seraphicus, Doctor Marianus (Szenen aus Goethes Faust)

J.Strauss

- Eisenstein, Falke (Die Fledermaus)

R.Strauss

- Harlequin (Ariadne auf Naxos)
- Olivier (Capriccio)

Verdi

- Marquis de Posa (Don Carlo)
- Ford (Falstaff)

Wagner

- Beckmesser (Die Meistersinger)
- Wolfram (Tannhäuser)

== Concert and Lieder repertoire ==
CONCERT

Brahms

- Requiem

Bach

- Solobasskantaten "ich habe genug", Kreuzstabkantate
- Johannespassion
- Matthäuspassion

Fauré

- Requiem

Haydn

- Schöpfung

Mendelssohn

- Elias
- Paulus

Mozart

- Mass in C minor
- Krönungsmesse

Mahler

- Des Knaben Wunderhorn
- Lieder eines fahrenden Gesellen

Orff

- Carmina Burana

Schubert

- Messe in C-Dur
- Messe in G-Dur

LIEDER

Brahms

Schubert

Schumann

Wolf

== Discography ==
DVDs

- Heinrich Marschner, Hans Heiling (M.Werba, A.C.Antonacci, H.Lippert, G.Fontana; regia P.L.Pizzi) aprile 2004 Cagliari, Teatro Lirico. Dynamic 33467/1-2
- Wolfgang Amadeus Mozart, La finta giardiniera (Gens, Kučerová, Reinprecht, Donose, Ainsley, Graham-Hall, Werba, Ivor Bolton) 2006 Mozarteum Orchestra Salzburg
- Franz Schubert, Alfonso und Estrella (Mei, Trost, Werba) Orchestra and Chorus of Teatro Lirico di Cagliari
- Wolfgang Amadeus Mozart, Die Zauberflote. Bernard Richter, Julia Kleiter, Mandy Fredrich, Georg Zeppenfeld, Markus Werba, Elisabeth Schwarz, Concentus Musicus Wien / Nikolaus Harnoncourt. Sony 2 DVD
- Die Meistersinger von Nürnberg Actors: Michael Volle, Georg Zeppenfeld, Markus Werba, Monika Bohinec, Roberto Saccà; conductor: Daniele Gatti, Vienna Philharmonic
