= Helena Łazarska =

Polish soprano (1934–2022)

Helena Łazarska (15 August 1934 – 28 October 2022) was a Polish operatic (lyric and Coloratura soprano) and vocal pedagogue.
