= Philippe Jordan =

Swiss conductor and pianist

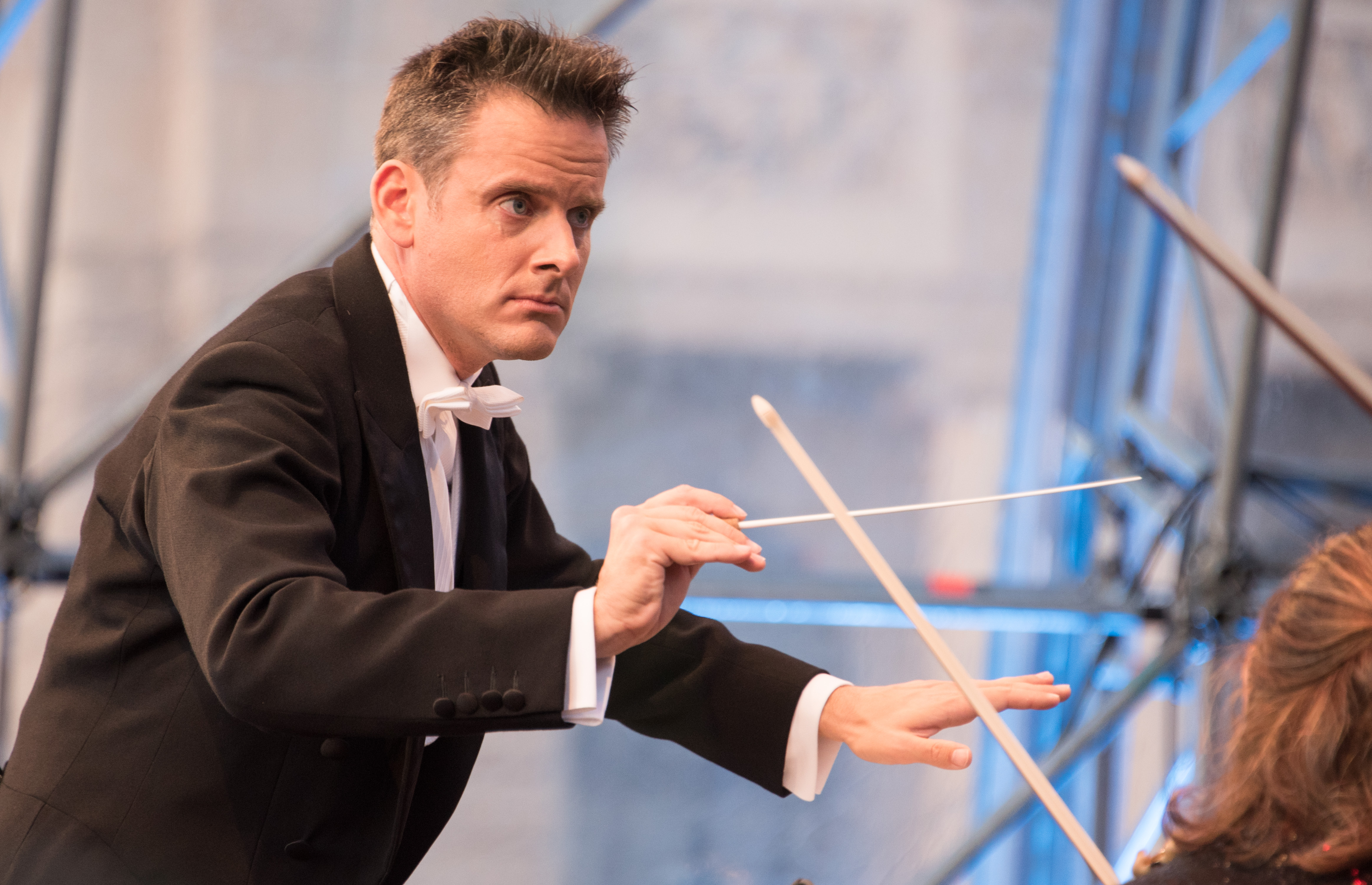
- Jordan conducting the 9th symphony of Beethoven, Fest der Freude, Vienna 2015
- Born: 18 October 1974 (age 51); Zurich, Switzerland
- Occupation: Conductor
- Website: philippejordan.net

Philippe Jordan (born 18 October 1974) is a Swiss conductor and pianist.

== Biography ==
Born in Zürich, the son of conductor Armin Jordan, he began to study piano at the age of six. At age eight, he joined the Zürcher Sängerknaben. He has acknowledged that he wished to become a conductor, like his father, at age 9. His violin studies began at age 11. At 16, he entered the Zürich Conservatory where he obtained his diploma in piano instruction, with honors. He studied theory and composition with the Swiss composer Hans Ulrich Lehmann and continued his piano studies with Karl Engel. At the same time, he worked as an assistant to Jeffrey Tate on Richard Wagner's Der Ring des Nibelungen at the Châtelet in Paris.

In the 1994/1995 season, Jordan was appointed first Kapellmeister and assistant to James Allen Gähres at the Theater Ulm. The following year, he made his debut at the Théâtre Royal de la Monnaie in Brussels. He has since conducted at the Grand Théâtre in Geneva, the Vienna Staatsoper, the Châtelet in Paris, the Semperoper in Dresden and the Aix-en-Provence International Festival.

From September 1998 to June 2001, Jordan was Kapellmeister and assistant to Daniel Barenboim at the Berlin State Opera (Staatsoper Unter den Linden). He now holds the title of principal guest conductor at the Staatsoper unter den Linden. Jordan was chief conductor of the Graz Opera and of the Graz Philharmonic Orchestra from September 2001 to June 2004.

In the 2001–2002 season, Jordan made his US operatic debut conducting Samson et Dalila at the Houston Grand Opera, and his UK operatic debut conducting Carmen at the Glyndebourne Festival Opera. In the 2002–2003 season, he made his debuts at the Metropolitan Opera and the Royal Opera House, Covent Garden. He made his first conducting appearance at the Bayerische Staatsoper in Munich in April 2004, and at the Bastille Opera in Paris in October 2004. His first appearances at the Salzburg Festival took place in the summer of 2004.

In October 2007, Jordan was named the music director of the Opéra National de Paris, starting with the 2009–2010 season. In October 2011, Jordan's contract with the Opéra National de Paris was extended through July 2018. In April 2015, the Opéra National de Paris further extended Jordan's contract through 2021. Jordan is scheduled to conclude his tenure at the Opéra National de Paris at the end of the 2020–2021 season.

In October 2011, Jordan was named chief conductor of the Wiener Symphoniker (Vienna Symphony Orchestra), effective with the 2014–2015 season, with an initial contract of five years. In December 2016, the orchestra announced the extension of Jordan's contract as chief conductor through the 2020–2021 season. He concluded his Vienna Symphony tenure at the close of the 2020–2021 season. In July 2017, the Vienna State Opera announced the appointment of Jordan as its next music director, effective with the 2020–2021 season. In October 2022, Jordan announced his intention to conclude his tenure with the Vienna State Opera at the close of the 2024–2025 season.

In October 2022, Jordan first guest-conducted the Orchestre National de France (ONF). He returned to the ONF for an additional guest-conducting engagement in October 2023. In November 2024, the ONF announced the appointment of Jordan as its next music director, effective with the 2027–2028 season.

In addition to conducting, Jordan also performs as a pianist in recital and chamber music, such as at the Schubertiade Schwarzenberg. His commercial recordings include Beethoven symphonies with the Vienna Symphony.

Cultural offices
Preceded by James Conlon	Music Director, Opéra National de Paris; 2009–2021	Succeeded by Gustavo Dudamel
Preceded by Franz Welser-Möst	Generalmusikdirektor, Vienna State Opera; 2020–present	Succeeded by incumbent
