= Günther Groissböck =

Austrian operatic bass (born 1976)

Günther Groissböck (born 24 September 1976) is an Austrian operatic bass. Anthony Tommasini, chief classical music critic for The New York Times, described Groissböck's "imposing and good-looking" portrayal of Baron Ochs in Der Rosenkavalier at the Metropolitan Opera, New York, as "a revelation". James Jorden of the New York Observer praised Groissböck's "innovative take" on the role and his "big, virile sound". A 2018 recording of the Met performance was nominated for Grammy Award in the Best Opera Recording.

== Early life ==
Groissböck was born in Waidhofen an der Ybbs in Lower Austria to a doctor (father) and a teacher (mother) and was self-motivated to play piano by the age of eight. He received vocal training at the University of Music and Performing Arts Vienna where he was under guidance from Robert Holl and José van Dam.

== Career ==
From 2002 to 2003, Groissböck was a scholar at the Eliette and Herbert von Karajan Institute and then became bass singer at the Zürich Opera House. He debuted in Die Liebe der Danae in 2002. In 2005, he appeared twice in a role of Sarastro in The Magic Flute under Riccardo Muti's baton. In 2007, he sang in Der Freischütz at the Salzburg Festival.

His debut at the Metropolitan Opera in New York was Colline in Puccini's La bohème in 2010. In 2011, Groissböck appeared as Landgrave Hermann in Wagner's Tannhäuser at the Bayreuth Festival. In 2013, Groissböck sang the role of Vodník in Rusalka.

In 2014, the artistic director of the Teatro Real in Madrid, Gerard Mortier, offered him the title role in Boris Godunov. In 2015, Groissböck sang the role of Baron Ochs at the Salzburg Festival in Der Rosenkavalier after his appearance five years ago in Rusalka which at that time was directed by former Vienna State Opera director Ioan Holender. The same year, he sang the Landgrave in Wagner's Tannhäuser at the Met. In 2016, he sang Gurnemanz with the Dutch National Opera in Wagner's Parsifal in Amsterdam again two years later at the Bayreuth Festival. During the 2016/2017 season he also sang as Fasolt in Wagner's Das Rheingold and Veit Pogner in Die Meistersinger von Nürnberg.

In 2017, Groissböck reprised his Ochs, this time at the Metropolitan Opera, and again at that house in 2019/2020. From 2017 to 2019, he appeared as Prince Gremin in Eugene Onegin.

Groissböck regularly gives lieder recitals. In 2018 he gave a recital at the Frankfurt Opera, accompanied by Malcolm Martineau, which included Brahms' Vier ernste Gesänge, Robert Schumann's Liederkreis, Op. 39, and the ending of Die Walküre. The same year he performed the role of King Marke in Tristan und Isolde with the Dutch National Opera. He was also part of the Metropolitan Opera's 2019 revival of Robert Lepage's production of Wagner's Ring Cycle as Fasolt.

He was supposed to sing Wotan in the new production of Der Ring des Nibelungen initially scheduled for the year 2020 at Bayreuth Festival and rescheduled for year 2022, but he decided to withdraw from this production. He sang Fiesco in Simon Boccanegra in September 2020, and will perform King Philip in Don Carlos in 2022 at the Metropolitan Opera. In 2024 he is scheduled to perform at the Bayreuth Festival again, as Veit Pogner in the festival's opening opera Die Meistersinger von Nürnberg.

Groissböck is also known for performances with La Scala in Milan, the Paris Opera, the Bavarian State Opera, the Staatsoper Unter den Linden and the Deutsche Oper Berlin, in roles such as Henry the Fowler in Wagner's Lohengrin, Hunding in Die Walküre, Banco in Verdi's Macbeth (opera) and Zaccaria in Nabucco, and Rocco in Beethoven's Fidelio. His international repertoire includes performances at the Accademia Nazionale di Santa Cecilia, Gewandhaus, the Berliner Philharmonie, Carnegie Hall and the Boston Symphony Hall.

== Recordings ==
Groissböck appeared in several productions filmed at the Zürich Opera House: Don Fernando in Fidelio under the baton of Nikolaus Harnoncourt (Arthaus Musik 2004); Police Inspector in Der Rosenkavalier under Franz Welser-Möst (EMI Classics 2004); Nightwatchman in Die Meistersinger under Welser-Möst (EMI Classics 2005); the King in Aida under Ádám Fischer (ARTE France 2006); Titurel on Bernard Haitink's recording of Parsifal (Deutsche Grammophon 2007); Boland in Fierrabras under Welser-Möst (EMI Classics 2007).

He sang Sarastro in Mozart's Die Zauberflöte, conducted by Roland Böer and filmed in 2011 at La Scala (Opus Arte). In 2012, his Landgrave in Tannhäuser under Sebastian Weigle at the Liceu was released for C Major Entertainment. In 2013, his performance as Fasolt in a concert of Das Rheingold under Marek Janowski was live recorded at the Berliner Philharmonie for Pentatone. Groissböck appears on several operas in the Metropolitan Opera Live in HD series

In 2017, Groissböck recorded Schubert's Winterreise and Schwanengesang, accompanied by Gerold Huber, for Decca. His 2018 album, Herz/Tod (Heart/Death), again with Huber and for Decca, featured lieder by Brahms, Wagner, Hugo Wolf, and Mahler. Also in 2018, the Metropolitan Opera recording of Der Rosenkavalier with Groissböck as Ochs was nominated for Grammy Award in the Best Opera Recording.
