= Thomas Rösner =

Austrian conductor (born 1973)

Thomas Rösner (born 12 June 1973) is an Austrian conductor.

== Life ==
Born in Mödling, Rösner studied at the University of Music and Performing Arts Vienna and attended master classes with Ilya Musin, Myung-Whun Chung and Hans Graf. He received decisive musical impulses as répétiteur of the Wiener Singverein (direction: Johannes Prinz), where he worked with conductors such as Riccardo Muti, Mariss Jansons, Georges Prêtre, Roger Norrington and Fabio Luisi.

== Career ==
In 1998, at Luisi's invitation, Rösner became assistant with the Orchestre de la Suisse Romande. From 2000 to 2004 Rösner was "Chef associé" at the Orchestre National de Bordeaux alongside Hans Graf. From 1995 to 2005, Rösner conducted the Sinfonietta Baden, which he founded, and in this capacity also conducted the performances of the Operklosterneuburg from 2001 to 2003. From 2005 to 2011, he was principal conductor of the Biel Solothurn Symphony Orchestra.

At the same time, invitations led Rösner to the podium of important orchestras: He conducted, among others, the Deutsches Symphonie-Orchester Berlin, London Philharmonic Orchestra, Vienna Symphony Orchestra, Bamberg Symphony Orchestra, Houston Symphony, Tokyo Symphony Orchestra, Orchestre de la Suisse Romande Bergen Philharmonic Orchestra, Orchestre National du Capitole de Toulouse, City of Prague Philharmonic Orchestra, Polish National Radio Symphony Orchestra, Sinfonia Varsovia, MDR Leipzig, Scottish Chamber Orchestra, Bournemouth Symphony Orchestra, Vienna Concert-Verein or the Mozarteum Orchestra Salzburg.

Rösner made his debut as an opera conductor in 1998 at the Teatro dell'Opera di Roma with Le nozze di Figaro. Since then he has conducted at the Bavarian State Opera, the Semperoper in Dresden, the Staatsoper Stuttgart, the Deutsche Oper Berlin, the Houston Grand Opera, the New National Theatre Tokyo, the Glyndebourne Festival, the Welsh National Opera in Cardiff, the Théâtre du Châtelet in Paris, the National Center for the Performing Arts in Beijing, the Korea National Opera, the Théatre de la Monnaie in Brussels, the Opernhaus Zürich, the Grand Théâtre de Genève, as well as at the opera houses in Lyon, Bordeaux, Nancy, Marseille, Nantes and Dijon.

He has also performed at festivals such as the Bregenz Festivals, the Edinburgh Festival, the Brucknerfest Linz and the Carinthian Summer.

Rösner's repertoire focuses on works of the First Viennese School, especially Mozart's operas, which he has conducted among others at the Zurich Opera House, Théatre de la Monnaie in Brussels or at Glyndebourne, the symphonic works of Beethoven, German Romanticism and works of the 20th century. In addition, he has given world premieres of works by Philippe Fénelon, Rudolf Kelterborn, Thomas Daniel Schlee, Jean-Luc Darbellay, Jost Meier, Gerd Kühr, Wolfram Wagner and Edward Rushton.

He is the artistic director of the Beethoven Philharmonie in Austria, which emerged in 2017 from the Sinfonietta Baden.

== Discography ==
As of 24 March 2010, source.

- L'orgue del Palau de la Musica Catalana (Columna Musica 1CM0111, 2003), Janáček Philharmonie, Orfeo Català
- Max Bruch: Kol Nidrei für Violine und Orchester, Ouvertüre zu „Scherz, List und Rache“ (Guild Music 7338), Biel Solothurn Symphony Orchestra, conductor: Thomas Rösner
- Ernest Bloch: Schindlers Liste (ATMA Classique ACD 22579), Sinfonie Orchester Biel, conductor: Thomas Rösner
- Giuseppe Verdi: Il trovatore (Opus Arte OA0974 D, DVD, 2006) Bregenzer Festspiele, Wiener Symphoniker, conductor: Thomas Rösner
- Joseph Haydn: Arias & Ouvertures, (ATMA Classique ACD2 2664), Jane Archibald, soprano, Sinfonie Orchester Biel, conductor: Thomas Rösner
- Paul Kletzki: Symphonie Nr. 3 (Musiques Suisses), Bamberger Symphoniker
- Paul Kletzki: Symphonie Nr. 2 (Musiques Suisses), Polish National Radio Symphony Orchestra
