= Franz Welser-Möst =

Austrian conductor (born 1960)

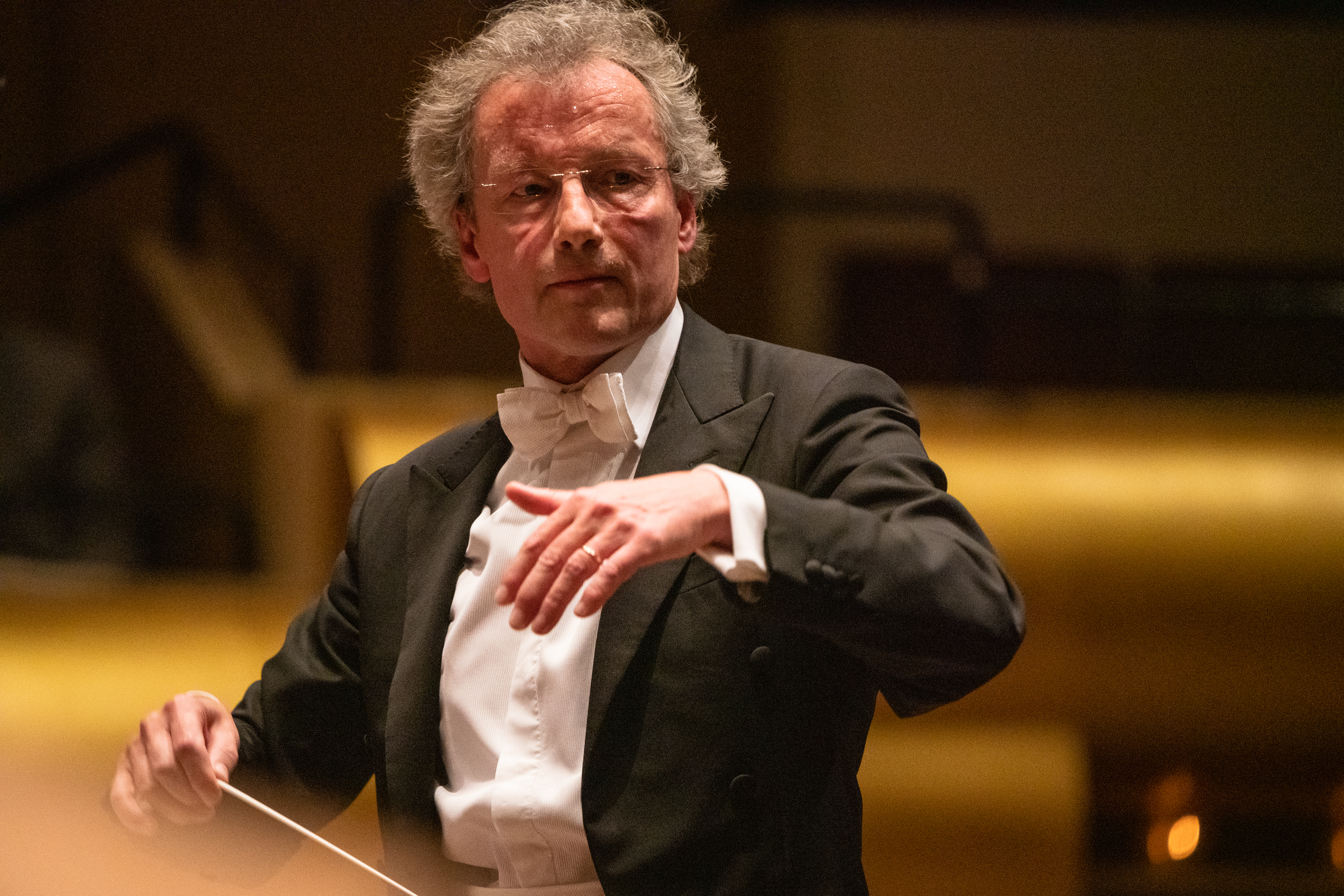
Welser-Möst conducting the New York Philharmonic (27 February 2020)

Franz Leopold Maria Möst (born 16 August 1960), known professionally as Franz Welser-Möst, is an Austrian conductor. He is currently music director of the Cleveland Orchestra.

== Biography ==
Franz Leopold Maria Möst was born in Linz, Austria, and later studied under the composer Balduin Sulzer. As a youth in Linz, he studied the violin and had developed an interest in conducting. After suffering injuries in a car crash that led to nerve damage, he stopped his violin studies and shifted full-time to conducting studies.

In 1985, Möst assumed the stage name Welser-Möst at the suggestion of his mentor, Baron Andreas von Bennigsen of Liechtenstein, in an homage to the city of Wels where he grew up. In 1986, he was adopted by Bennigsen. In 1992, Welser-Möst married Bennigsen's former wife, Angelika. His first major debuts were at the Salzburg Festival in 1985, followed by the London Philharmonic Orchestra in 1986 and the Orchester Musikkollegium Winterthur in 1988.

Between 1986 and 1991, Welser-Möst served as the principal conductor of the Norrköping Symphony Orchestra, Sweden, and in 1990 he became principal conductor of the London Philharmonic Orchestra (LPO). His LPO tenure was controversial, with the orchestral players in the London Philharmonic giving him the nickname "Frankly Worse than Most". He concluded his LPO tenure in 1996.

From 1995 to 2000, he was music director with the Zürich Opera House. He became general music director of the Zürich Opera in September 2005, with an original commitment to the Opera through 2011. However, he stood down from the Zürich post in July 2008, after having agreed to serve in the same capacity at the Vienna State Opera. Welser-Möst first conducted at the Vienna State Opera in 1987, as a substitute for Claudio Abbado in a production of Gioachino Rossini's L'italiana in Algeri. On 6 June 2007, the Austrian government announced the appointment of Welser-Möst as Generalmusikdirektor of the Vienna State Opera, effective September 2010, alongside Dominique Meyer as director (Staatsoperndirektor). In September 2014, he announced his resignation from the Vienna State Opera, effective immediately. Welser-Möst is an honorary member of the Wiener Singverein. He conducted the Vienna Philharmonic Orchestra in its Vienna New Year's Concert in 2011, 2013 and 2023.

Welser-Möst made his United States conducting debut with the St. Louis Symphony in 1989. He guest-conducted the Cleveland Orchestra for the first time in February 1993. With the 2002–03 season, Welser-Möst became the seventh music director of the Cleveland Orchestra. His most recent contract extension is through the 2026–27 season. During his tenure, Welser-Möst has led the orchestra's ongoing residency at the Musikverein in Vienna, which began with Welser-Möst's first European tour in 2003. In addition, under Welser-Möst, the orchestra initiated an annual residency at Miami's Carnival Center for the Performing Arts (later renamed the Adrienne Arsht Center for the Performing Arts) in 2007.

Under Welser-Möst, the orchestra began presenting regularly staged operas in 2009, reviving a practice by his predecessor Christoph von Dohnányi. These concert opera presentations have included a three-year cycle of the Mozart/Da Ponte operas, Le nozze di Figaro, Don Giovanni, and Così fan tutte, Richard Strauss's Salome (2011–2012), Janáček's The Cunning Little Vixen (2013–2014 and 2017–2018), Strauss' Daphne (2014–2015) and Ariadne auf Naxos (2018–2019), Bartók's The Miraculous Mandarin and Bluebeard's Castle in the 2015–16 season (a collaboration with the Joffrey Ballet), and Debussy's Pelléas et Mélisande (2016–17).

Welser-Möst published his autobiography, Als ich die Stille fand: Ein Plädoyer gegen den Lärm der Welt, in 2020; it was published in English in May 2021 under the title From Silence: Finding Calm in a Dissonant World. In October 2023, Welser-Möst had a cancerous tumor removed and canceled his conducting performances from late October through the end of 2023. In January 2024, The Cleveland Orchestra announced that Welser-Möst is to conclude his tenure as its music director at the close of the 2026–2027 season.

== Recordings ==
During his tenure with the LPO, Welser-Möst had established an exclusive recording contract with EMI. His 1996 recording of Franz Schmidt's Symphony No. 4 received the Gramophone Award for Best Orchestral Recording. The CDs of Anton Bruckner's Mass No. 3 and Te Deum and works of Erich Wolfgang Korngold both received Grammy Award nominations for "Best Classical Album." EMI struck a similar deal with Welser-Möst to record performances at the Zürich Opera and has released a number of DVDs of his Zürich opera productions. In 2008, EMI reissued many of Welser-Möst's earlier recordings in an eight CD set. In October 2007, Deutsche Grammophon released the first commercial recording featuring Welser-Möst with the Cleveland Orchestra, Beethoven's Symphony No. 9. This recording was soon followed by a disc of Richard Wagner Lieder performed by the orchestra and soloist Measha Brueggergosman. Several DVDs have been issued as well, including Bruckner's 7th and 8th symphonies, at Severance Hall, and the 5th and 4th at the St. Florian Monastery. In 2020, Welser-Möst and The Cleveland Orchestra released a three-disc recording featuring works from the past three centuries, The Cleveland Orchestra: A New Century, the first recording on the orchestra's own in-house label.

Cultural offices
Preceded by Okko Kamu	Principal Conductor, Norrköping Symphony Orchestra; 1986–1991	Succeeded by Junichi Hirokami
Preceded by Ralf Weikert (chief conductor)	Chief Conductor and Generalmusikdirektor, Zürich Opera; 1995–2005 (chief conductor), 2005–2008 (Generalmusikdirektor)	Succeeded by Daniele Gatti (chief conductor)
Preceded by Seiji Ozawa	Generalmusikdirektor, Vienna State Opera; 2010–2014	Succeeded by Philippe Jordan
