= Lawrence Brownlee =

American opera singer (born 1972)

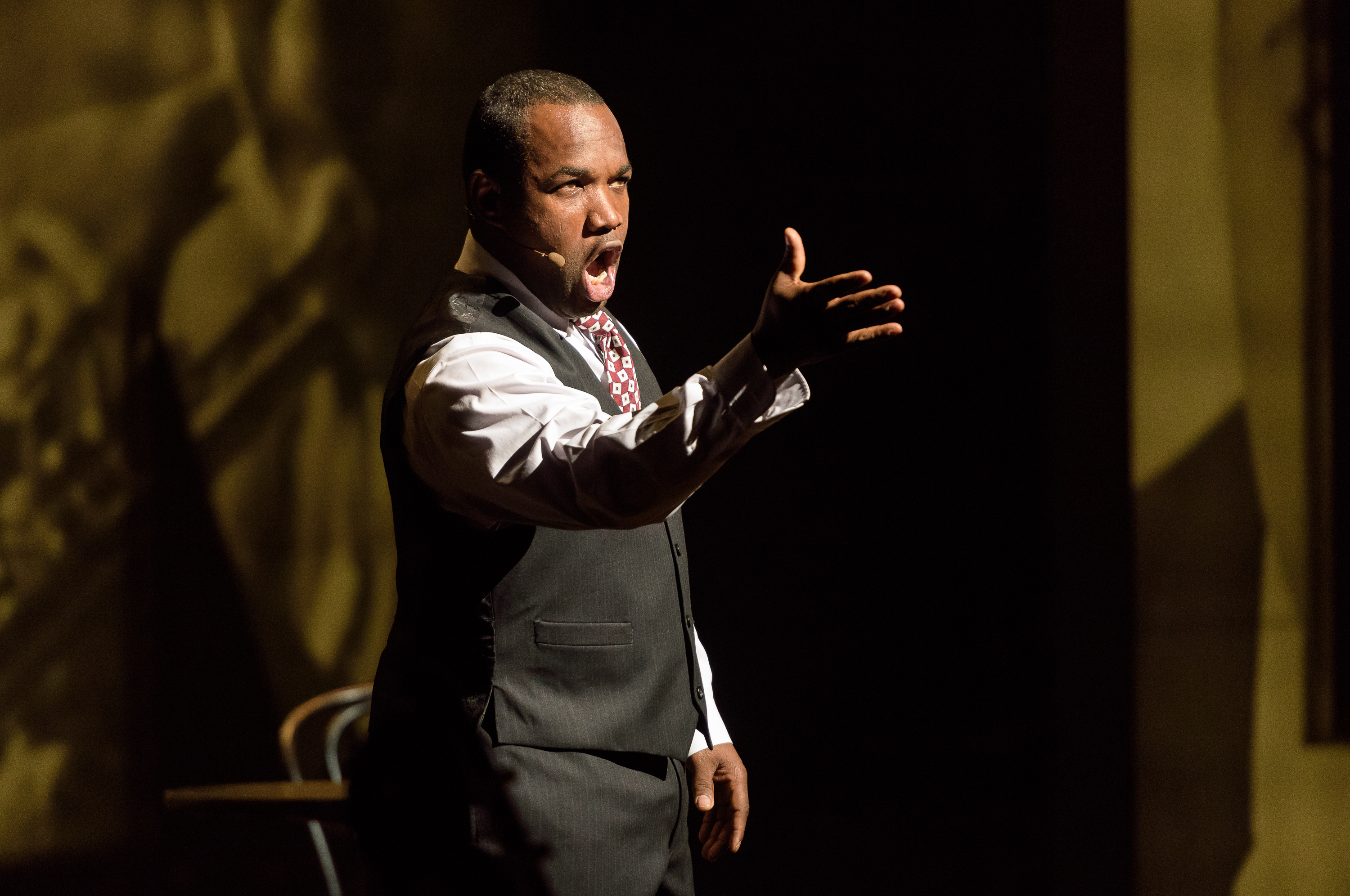
Brownlee, 2018

Lawrence Brownlee (born November 24, 1972) is an American operatic tenor particularly associated with the bel canto repertoire. Describing his voice, Speight Jenkins, general director of the Seattle Opera, said: "There are other singers that sing this repertory very well, but I don't think anyone else has quite as beautiful a sound and as rounded a tone," and praise his "incredible top notes", adding about his high F (F_{5}) in "Credeasi, misera": "With him it's not a scream, it's a beautiful sound." Mezzo-soprano Joyce DiDonato added: "He is always in service of the music. His natural instrument is just incredibly beautiful. The word 'honey' comes to mind. He also has technical prowess and agility."

== Early life and education ==
Brownlee was born in Youngstown, Ohio. He grew up without much exposure to classical music but had an extremely musical childhood, playing trumpet, guitar and drums, and singing Gospel music in church. His first gigs were at an amusement park in Sandusky, Ohio, singing pop and show tunes. Brownlee attended Anderson University in Indiana for his undergraduate degree and Indiana University Jacobs School of Music for graduate studies. He studied with tenors Dr. David Edgar Starkey and Dr. Fritz Robertson, and soprano Costanza Cuccaro. While a graduate student, he became a member of Kappa Alpha Psi fraternity; his desire to become a member was due in large part to his association with members of its Alpha chapter, founded at Indiana University Bloomington in January 1911. He was officially initiated into the Indianapolis Alumni Chapter in the fall of 1999, but considers himself close to the founding chapter and was involved in many of its activities while a student. He became a life member in 2008.

Brownlee participated in young artist programs at the Seattle Opera and the Wolf Trap Opera Company.

== Career ==
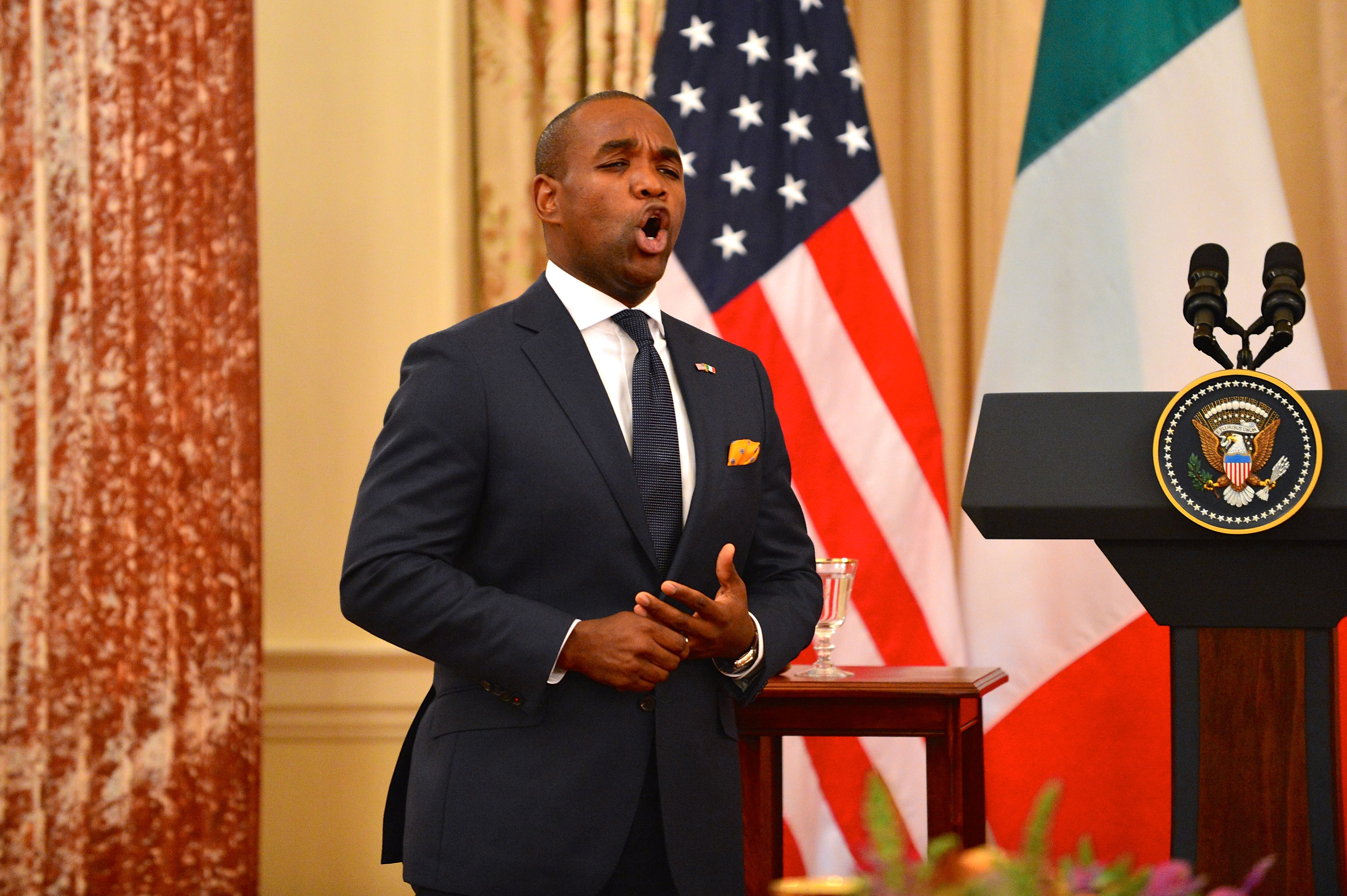
Brownlee singing at a State Luncheon in honor of the Italian Prime Minister, 2016

Brownlee's professional stage debut took place in 2002 as Almaviva in Rossini's The Barber of Seville with Virginia Opera. Brownlee made his Metropolitan Opera debut in a new production of Il Barbiere di Siviglia in 2007. The role has since become one of his most recognizable and famous. He has subsequently appeared in Il Barbiere in Vienna, Milan, Berlin, Madrid, Dresden, Munich, Baden-Baden, Hamburg, Tokyo, New York, Washington, San Diego, Seattle, and Boston. Brownlee's career highlights include performances of The Barber of Seville at the Vienna State Opera, the Boston Lyric Opera and Madrid's Teatro Real. He has appeared in Rossini's L'italiana in Algeri and La Cenerentola at Milan's La Scala, as Belfiore in Rossini's Il viaggio a Reims in Brussels, and as Tonio in Donizetti's La fille du régiment at the Cincinnati Opera. He has also received acclaim in Rossini's Armida, alongside Renée Fleming, in the famously challenging role of Tonio in La fille du régiment, and as Arturo in I puritani at the Metropolitan Opera. In 2014 Brownlee, Juan Diego Flórez, and Javier Camarena were called "The Three Tenors," and said to "represent a new golden age in high male voices and in the singular thrill of their top notes."

In concert, Brownlee has performed in Handel's Messiah with the Houston Symphony and the San Francisco Symphony. He has given recitals under the auspices of the Marilyn Horne Foundation, and was featured in one of that Foundation's Gala Concerts at Lincoln Center. In May 2010, Brownlee performed a concert with mezzo-soprano Denyce Graves in the United States Supreme Court Building for the Supreme Court justices. He also gives recitals with selections from his Spiritual Sketches album with Damien Sneed, new arrangements of traditional music, including for an NPR "Tiny Desk Concert".

Brownlee created the role of Syme in Lorin Maazel's opera 1984 in its world premiere at London's Royal Opera House on May 3, 2005. In 2015, he performed the role of Charlie Parker in the premiere of Daniel Schnyder's opera Yardbird at Opera Philadelphia. In 2018, Brownlee premiered Cycles of My Being, commissioned by Opera Philadelphia, Lyric Opera of Chicago, and Carnegie Hall, composed by Tyshawn Sorey and poetry by Terrance Hayes. This song cycle centers on what it means to be a black man living in America today; in 2020 it was made into a film with Opera Philadelphia and released on their digital channel.

== Personal life ==
Brownlee is a fan of the Pittsburgh Steelers. He also likes photography and playing table tennis, and is an avid salsa dancer. He sang the national anthem at Heinz Field on November 15, 2015, when the Steelers played the Cleveland Browns.

== Awards ==
- Winner of the 2005 Metropolitan Opera National Council Auditions.
- Winner of the 2006 Richard Tucker Award
- Winner of the 2007 Marian Anderson Award
- Winner of the 2008 Opera Company of Philadelphia's Alter Award for Artistic Excellence
- Seattle Opera's Artist of the Year in 2008 for his performances as Arturo in Bellini's I puritani.

== Recordings ==
- Spiritual Sketches – Lawrence Brownlee, Damien Sneed. Label: LeChateau Earl Records B00DE0SZ96
- The Heart That Flutters – Lawrence Brownlee, Iain Burnside. Label: Opus Arte B00CK1PAJS
- Virtuoso Rossini Arias – Lawrence Brownlee, Constantine Orbelian, Kaunas City Symphony. Label: Delos B00IL85VR0
- Maazel: 1984 – Simon Keenlyside, Nancy Gustafson, Richard Margison, Diana Damrau, Lawrence Brownlee; Orchestra & Chorus of the Royal Opera House, Covent Garden, Lorin Maazel (conductor). Label: Decca DVD 074 3289
- Orff: Carmina Burana – Sally Matthews (soprano), Lawrence Brownlee (tenor), Christian Gerhaher (baritone); Berlin Philharmonic; Simon Rattle (conductor). Label: EMI Classics CD 57888/EuroArts/Opus Arte DVD, EUA 2053678
- Italian Songs (Schubert, Verdi, Donizetti, Bellini, and Rossini) – Lawrence Brownlee (tenor), Martin Katz (piano). Label EMI Classics CD 86503
- Mayr: Medea in Corinto – Elżbieta Szmytka, Evelyn Pollock, Lawrence Brownlee, Mark Milhofer, Wojtek Gierlach; Figerete Ymeraj, Andrés de Castillo, Carlos Petruzziello; Chorus and Orchestra of the Theater St. Gallen; David Stern (conductor). Label: OEHMS Classics OC 933
- Rossini: Armida – Renée Fleming, Lawrence Brownlee, John Osborn, Barry Banks, Kobie van Rensburg, Yegishe Manucharyan, Keith Miller; Chorus and Orchestra of the Metropolitan Opera; Riccardo Frizza (conductor). Label: Decca DVD 074.3416
- Rossini: Il barbiere di Siviglia – Elīna Garanča, Lawrence Brownlee, Giovanna Donadini, Nathan Gunn, Roberto Accurso, Bruno de Simone, Kristinn Sigmundsson; Münchner Rundfunkorchester; Chor des Bayerischen Rundfunks; Miguel Ángel Gómez Martínez (conductor). Label: Sony/BMG 822876 80429 2
- Rossini: La Cenerentola – Rachelle Durkin, Elīna Garanča, Lawrence Brownlee, Patricia Risley, Simone Alberghini, Alessandro Corbelli, John Relyea; Chorus and Orchestra of the Metropolitan Opera; Maurizio Benini (conductor). Label: Deutsche Grammophon DVD 073 4577
- Rossini: L'italiana in Algeri– Ruth Gonzalez, Marianna Pizzolato, Elsa Giannoulidou, Lawrence Brownlee, Bruno de Simone, Lorenzo Regazzo, Giulio Mastrototaro; Rossini in Wildbad Festival, Virtuosi Brunensis; Transylvania State Philharmonic Choir; Alberto Zedda (conductor). Label: Naxos 8.660284-85
- Rossini: Amici e Rivali - Michael Spyres, Lawrence Brownlee (tenors), I Virtuosi Italiani, Corrado Rovaris (conductor). Label: Erato.
- Rossini: Stabat Mater – Anna Netrebko (soprano), Joyce DiDonato (mezzo-soprano), Lawrence Brownlee (tenor), Ildebrando d'Arcangelo (bass); Accademia Nazionale di Santa Cecilia; Antonio Pappano (conductor). Label: EMI Classics 5099964052922
- Rossini Songs (Il Salotto – Volume 13) – Mireille Delunsch, Jennifer Larmore, Catherine Wyn-Rogers, Mark Wilde, Lawrence Brownlee, Brindley Sherratt; Malcolm Martineau (piano). Label: Opera Rara ORR247
- Operngala 16, Festliche Operagala für die AIDS-Stiftung – Simone Kermes, Ailyn Pérez, Petra-Maria Schnitzer, Lawrence Brownlee, Ketevan Kemoklidze, Renata Pokupić, Peter Seiffert, Michael Volle; Chorus and Orchestra of the Deutsche Oper Berlin; Andriy Yurkevych (conductor). Label: Naxos 8.551233
- Colbran, The Muse – Joyce DiDonato (mezzo-soprano), Lawrence Brownlee (tenor); Orchestra e Coro dell'Accademia Nazionale de Santa Cecilia; Edoardo Müller (conductor). Label: Virgin Classics 945790 6
