= A Harlot's Progress (opera) =

Opera by Iain Bell

A Harlot's Progress is an opera in six scenes by the British composer Iain Bell which is based on William Hogarth's series of etchings of the same name. The libretto is by British author Peter Ackroyd. The story concerns a country girl, who comes to the big city and becomes mistress of an old, rich man. Thrown out by him because of her taking of younger lovers, she becomes diseased and mad and eventually dies in misery.

The opera premiered at the Theater an der Wien in Vienna on 13 October 2013 with coloratura soprano Diana Damrau in the lead role of Moll Hackabout conducted by Mikko Franck in a production by Jens-Daniel Herzog. Additional cast members included Nathan Gunn, Marie McLaughlin, Irish mezzo-soprano Tara Erraught, English tenor Christopher Gillett and French bass-baritone Nicolas Testé, with the Arnold Schoenberg Choir as the chorus, and the Vienna Symphony Orchestra. Following the successful critical and audience response to the piece, the performance of 24 October 2013 was broadcast in a live web stream, in what was Theater an der Wien's first such transmission from their main auditorium.

== Roles ==
Role	Voice type	Premiere cast, 13 October 2013 Conductor: Mikko Franck
Moll Hackabout, a harlot	coloratura soprano	Diana Damrau
Mother Needham, a procuress	mezzo-soprano	Marie McLaughlin
Kitty, Moll's maid	mezzo-soprano	Tara Erraught
James Dalton, a highwayman	baritone	Nathan Gunn
Mr Lovelace, Moll's first keeper	tenor	Christopher Gillett
Coachman/Officer/Jailer	bass	Nicolas Testé

== Synopsis ==
- Scene 1: Cheapside
- Scene 2: The house of Lovelace, Leadenhall Street
- Scene 3: A garret in Drury Lane
- Scene 4: Bridewell Prison
- Scene 5: The garret
- Scene 6: Moll's wake, the garret

== Critical reception ==
The piece was very well received. The Oberösterreichische Nachrichten described it as an "enthralling and acclaimed world premiere". The Kurier called it "cinematic, dramatic and thrilling" and Der Standard referred to it as a "soul-devouring juggernaut". George Loomis of The New York Times praised Bell, saying the mad scene in the piece "confirms that Bell knows how to write for the human voice" and that the composer was "an accomplished writer for the orchestra" and Seen and Heard hailed it as an "...opera to be reckoned with. A Harlot's Progress together with Written on Skin by George Benjamin are the great successes of contemporary opera". The newspapers Österreich and Der Neue Merkur reported the tremendous applause the piece received on the opening night. Some of these above reviewers also drew attention to the unrelenting bleakness of the subject matter with Bachtrack stating "Its chances for being incorporated into modern repertory are good – if people can handle the utterly depressing plot". Gerhard Persché of Opera, while impressed with the performance, commented that the libretto was "too deliberately vulgar and provocative" and while praising elements of the music felt that "the composer doesn't seem altogether at home with opera as a form".
