= Rod Gilfry =

American opera singer

Rodney Gilfry is a leading American operatic baritone. After launching his career at Frankfurt Opera in 1987, Gilfry quickly established a reputation for stylish singing and acting. A renowned Mozart specialist, he has given acclaimed performances as Don Giovanni, Count Almaviva, Guglielmo, and Papageno, and is also known for his work in roles from the standard baritone repertoire (Pelléas, Valentin, Orestes, Belcore, Billy Budd).

== Early years and training ==
Rod Gilfry was born 11 March 1959 in Covina, California, and grew up in West Covina and Claremont. He received a bachelor's degree in music education from Cal State Fullerton and a master's degree in voice from the Thornton School of Music at the University of Southern California. He studied at the Music Academy of the West with Martial Singher with whom he also studied privately for six years. In 1999 he sought further refinement of his technique and studied in Manhattan with Armen Boyajian, teacher of Samuel Ramey and Gerald Finley.

== Opera career ==
Gilfry made his opera debut as a comprimario in Otello at Los Angeles Opera in 1986. After seven years as a principal baritone at Frankfurt Opera and Zurich Opera, he returned to the U.S. and originated roles at major houses such as the Metropolitan Opera, Lyric Opera of Chicago, Dallas Opera, San Diego Opera, and Los Angeles Opera.

On November 25, 1996, Gilfry made his debut with the Metropolitan Opera as Demetrius in the company's premiere of Britten's A Midsummer Night's Dream, a role he sang eight times that season. He returned in the 2000-2001 season for six performances each as Marcello in Puccini's La bohème and as Guglielmo in Mozart's Così fan tutte.

Gilfry went on to specialize in new music, introducing rôles in many new operas. He is probably best known for his portrayal of Stanley Kowalski in André Previn's A Streetcar Named Desire at San Francisco Opera which premiered in 1998. He also created the role of Nathan in Sophie's Choice at Royal Opera House Covent Garden in 2002, a role he will reprise at Washington National Opera in September 2006. He originated the role of Tsar Nicholas in Drattell's Nicholas and Alexandra at Los Angeles Opera in 2003. During the 2005–2006 season he played plantation owner Edward Gaines in the opera, Margaret Garner, at Opera Philadelphia, Cincinnati Opera, and Michigan Opera Theatre. During August 2006 he portrayed Prospero in Thomas Ades' The Tempest with the Santa Fe Opera, one of the few rôles in new opera that he did not originate. In November 2006 he created the role of Jack London in Libby Larsen's Every Man Jack for Sonoma City Opera. In 2008 he sang the principal role of Falke in a Japanese tour of Die Fledermaus and the title role in the Dutch/British production of Olivier Messiaen's opera Saint François d'Assise. At the Zürich Opera he performed the part of the composer in the "domestic comedy" Intermezzo of Richard Strauss, conducted by Peter Schneider and staged by Jens-Daniel Herzog, with Christiane Kohl as Christine. In February 2020 he created the role of Eurydice's father in the world premiere of Eurydice, written by Matthew Aucoin with a libretto by Sarah Ruhl, at the Los Angeles Opera.

Octavio Roca said of him in the San Francisco Chronicle: "Even within the embarrassment of riches that is today's crop of baritones, Gilfry surely stands out as one of the few to treasure. Here is a lusciously shaded lyric voice with real dramatic possibilities, with phrasing full of rhythmic vitality and a stage presence many a non-musical actor might envy."

He has sung on 25 recordings including his 1995 Don Giovanni CD which was nominated for a Grammy.

== Crossover to musicals ==
Gilfry fell in love with musicals when he starred in his high school production of Li'l Abner. He has sung Curly in Oklahoma!, Billy Bigelow in Carousel, and Joe in The Most Happy Fella, all in Los Angeles. In New York he played Robert in the City Center Encores! production of The New Moon, a role he also recorded. He has told interviewers that he hopes to do a run on Broadway in a new musical or revival. In June 2009 he launched the Ravinia Festival season, starring as Lancelot opposite Sylvia McNair's Guenevere in a concert version of Camelot. As of September 2009, Gilfry is starring as Emile de Becque in the national tour South Pacific. In the summer of 2011, he played Frank Butler opposite the Annie Oakley of diva Deborah Voigt in Annie Get Your Gun at the Glimmerglass Festival in Cooperstown, New York, a production directed by Glimmerglass general director, Francesca Zambello.

In tandem with actor/director Charles Nelson Reilly, he developed a one-man cabaret show that he takes on the road when he is not performing opera or musicals. He also made a DVD and enhanced CD of his cabaret show.

On 22 August 2010, he appeared at the Royal Albert Hall, London alongside Kim Criswell in a BBC Prom celebrating the music of Rodgers & Hammerstein. The concert was broadcast on the BBC on Saturday 28 August 2010.

In June 2012 Gilfry garnered critical acclaim for his portrayal of Sweeney Todd in the Opera Theatre of Saint Louis festival production of Sweeney Todd, directed by Ron Daniels and conducted by Stephen Lord, reprising the role he had sung at the Theatre du Chatelet Paris (home of the Chatelet Opera) under the baton of David Charles Abell, partnered by Caroline O'Connor as Mrs Lovett.

== Personal ==
Married with three children, Gilfry makes his home in suburban Los Angeles. Gilfry shortened his performing name from Rodney to Rod in 2005, and he celebrated his 20th year as a professional opera singer in 2006. His daughter Carin is also an opera singer and his son Marc is in the band Neil Frances.

Gilfry was featured in a 2004 episode of the PBS children's television show Arthur, called "Lights, Camera... Opera!" as himself, in which he plays the role of Escamillo in Carmen.
