= Marcus Ullmann =

German classical tenor (born 1967)

- Born: 1967; Dresden
- Education: Dresdner Kreuzchor
- Occupation: Classical tenor

Marcus Ullmann (born 1967) is a German classical tenor.

== Professional career ==
Born in Dresden, Marcus Ullmann received his first musical training as a choir boy in the Dresdner Kreuzchor. He studied at the Dresden Music Academy and graduated with honours in Lieder, Choral Work and Opera. He continued his studies in master classes with Dietrich Fischer-Dieskau, Elisabeth Schwarzkopf and Theo Adam, among others.

He recorded several Bach cantatas and Bach's Christmas Oratorio with Helmuth Rilling and the Gächinger Kantorei. He appeared with them in Bach's St Matthew Passion in Washington, D.C., and in Handel's Messiah in Salzburg. Peter Schreier was the conductor of Bach's St John Passion with the Leipzig Gewandhaus Orchestra. With the Thomanerchor he recorded the work also conducted by Georg Christoph Biller.

In 2002 he sang the Evangelist on a recording of the St Matthew Passion with Enoch zu Guttenberg, Klaus Mertens representing Jesus. In 2004 he sang the Evangelist in Bach's Christmas Oratorio (parts 1 to 3) with Hans-Christoph Rademann, the Dresdner Kammerchor and the Dresdner Barockorchester, recorded live in the Lukaskirche, Dresden. With them he had recorded in 1998 Jan Dismas Zelenka's Te Deum and Johann David Heinichen's Missa No. 9. He has also been recording Bach cantatas in the series of Sigiswald Kuijken and La Petite Bande to cover a complete liturgical year. He recorded Bach's Mass in B minor with the Kammerchor Stuttgart and Frieder Bernius. In 2008 he recorded the work with Jürgen Budday, the Maulbronn Chamber Choir and the Hannoversche Hofkapelle. Also in 2008 she recorded in the Frauenkirche Dresden the Christmas oratorio of Gottfried August Homilius and Christian August Jacobi's Der Himmel steht uns wieder offen, with Christiane Kohl, Annette Markert, Tobias Berndt, Sächsisches Vocalensemble and Virtuosi Saxoniae, conducted by Ludwig Güttler.

He has taken part in the Deutsche Schubert-Lied-Edition, the recording of all Lieder of Franz Schubert, which number more than 700 and are set to the poetry of over 115 writers. In 2002 he participated in the first recording of Einojuhani Rautavaara’s song cycle The Lovers on four poems of Rainer Maria Rilke, in a version for tenor and string quartet.

In 2009 Ullmann appeared as Nerone in Monteverdi's opera L'incoronazione di Poppea at the Boston Early Music Festival with Gillian Keith as Poppea.
