= Annette Markert =

German classical mezzo-soprano and alto

- Born: Kaltensundheim, Thuringia
- Education: Mozarteum
- Occupation: Classical mezzo-soprano
- Organization: Halle Opera House

Annette Markert (born in Kaltensundheim, Thuringia) is a German classical mezzo-soprano and contralalto.

== Career ==
Annette Markert studied voice at the Leipzig School of Music and was engaged at the Halle Opera House in Halle, Saxony-Anhalt from 1983 to 1990, when she moved to the Leipzig Opera.

Since 1996 she has worked as a free-lance artist in concert and opera. She appeared with the New York Philharmonic conducted by Kurt Masur, the Vienna Philharmonic with Philippe Herreweghe, and the Internationale Bachakademie Stuttgart with Helmuth Rilling, among others. She sang Bach's Mass in B minor in London, conducted by Sir Roger Norrington, in memory of the 250th anniversary of the composer's death. She has performed annually with the Thomanerchor and the Dresdner Kreuzchor and took part in the project of Ton Koopman to record the complete vocal works of Bach with the Amsterdam Baroque Orchestra & Choir. In 2004, she appeared at the Rheingau Musik Festival in a recorded performance of Handel's Messiah.

On the opera stage, she has interpreted the title roles of such Handel operas as Floridante, Rinaldo, Oreste, and Giulio Cesare.

In 2008, she recorded in the Frauenkirche Dresden the Christmas Oratorio of Gottfried August Homilius and Christian August Jacobi's Der Himmel steht uns wieder offen, with Christiane Kohl, Marcus Ullmann, Tobias Berndt, Sächsisches Vocalensemble and Virtuosi Saxoniae, conducted by Ludwig Güttler.
