= 1984 (opera) =

2005 opera by Lorin Maazel

- Opera by Lorin Maazel
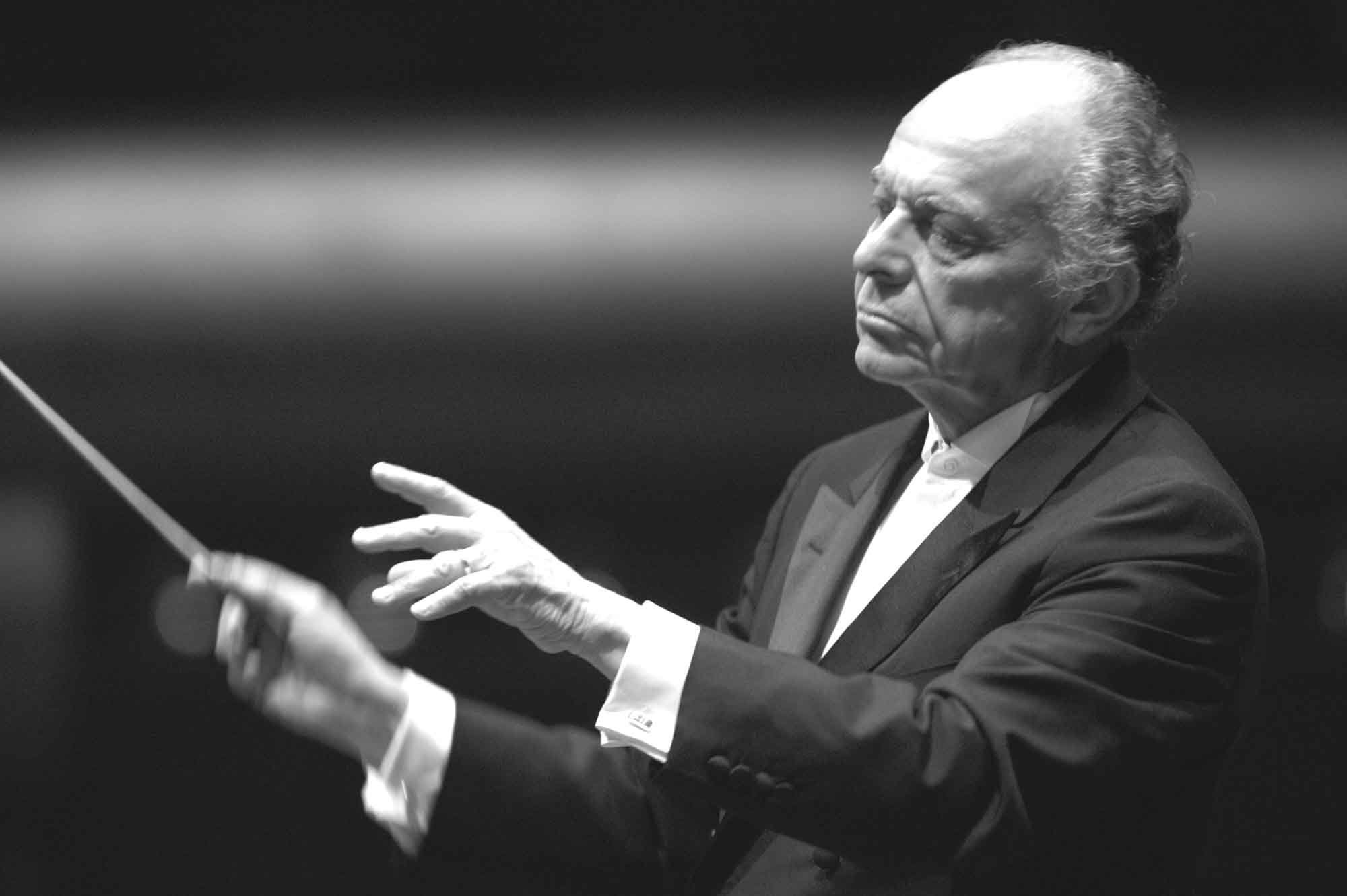
- The composer and conductor.
- Librettist: J. D. McClatchy; Thomas Meehan
- Language: English
- Based on: Nineteen Eighty-Four by George Orwell
- Premiere: 3 May 2005; Royal Opera House, London
- Website: www.1984theopera.com

1984 is an opera by the American conductor and composer Lorin Maazel, with a libretto by J. D. McClatchy and Thomas Meehan. The opera is based on George Orwell's 1949 dystopian novel, Nineteen Eighty-Four. It premiered on 3 May 2005 at the Royal Opera House, Covent Garden in a production directed by Robert Lepage.

== History ==
1984 was the first opera composed by Maazel, following a conducting career that spanned more than 50 years; he was 75 years old when his work had its premiere. The opera was originally commissioned by August Everding, the director of the Bavarian State Opera, and Maazel later admitted surprise at the offer. "I'd never thought of writing an opera, and it took years to convince me," he stated in an interview prior to the premiere.

After Everding died, it appeared the work might not proceed, but Maazel got it picked up by Covent Garden and the Tokyo Opera. This was to be a joint endeavour, but Tokyo ultimately backed out, leaving it in limbo again. Maazel then stepped in and paid about £400,000 to finance the project through a company he formed for the purpose, Big Brother Productions. By picking up nearly half the costs, he allowed the Royal Opera House to spend what it would for a typical revival from the standard repertoire, rather than a more expensive new production. This saved the opera from oblivion, but also led to charges that the Royal Opera House was spending taxpayer money to support a vanity project.

== Cast ==
Roles, voice types, premiere cast
Role	Voice type	Premiere cast, 3 May 2005 Conductor: Lorin Maazel
Winston	baritone	Simon Keenlyside
Julia	soprano	Nancy Gustafson
O'Brien	tenor	Richard Margison
Gym Instructor	soprano	Diana Damrau
Drunken Woman	soprano	Diana Damrau
Syme	tenor	Lawrence Brownlee
Parsons	bass	Jeremy White
Charrington	bass	Graeme Danby
Prole Woman	mezzo-soprano	Mary Lloyd-Davies
Café Singer		Johnnie Fiori
Pub Quartet		The Demon Barbers

In contrast with the conventions of most operas, 1984 casts the hero, Winston, as a baritone (sung by Simon Keenlyside at the premiere), while the lead tenor takes the role of the villain, O'Brien (sung by Richard Margison at the premiere). The part of Julia was sung by soprano Nancy Gustafson in the original production. Other individual parts in the opera include Syme, Parsons, and Charrington, a gym instructor/drunken woman, a prole woman, and a café singer. Maazel incorporates an important role for the chorus, which sings a "hate chorus" for the rallies Orwell called Two Minutes Hate, as well as a rousing "National Anthem of Oceania." The telescreen voice was spoken by Jeremy Irons. The children's chorus was provided by the New London Children's Choir.

== Production team ==
- Production directed by Robert Lepage
- Set Designer: Carl Fillion
- Costume Designer: Yasmina Giguère
- Lighting: Michel Beaulieu
- Choreography: Sylvain Émard
- Assistant Director: Neilson Vignola
- Projection Designer: Jacques Collin
- Image Designer: Lionel Arnould
- Properties Designer: Patricia Ruel
- Sound Effects: Jean-Sébastien Côté
- Production Manager: Bernard Gilbert
- Technical Director: Michel Gosselin
- Technical Consultant: Tobie Horswill
- Producer for Ex Machina: Michel Bernatchez

== Reviews ==
The British press reviews for the London premiere were negative. Andrew Clements' review in The Guardian berated the effort, declaring that it was "both shocking and outrageous that the Royal Opera, a company of supposed international standards and standing, should be putting on a new opera of such wretchedness and lack of musical worth." Andrew Clark of the Financial Times stated that the "only reason we find this slick perversion of Orwell on the Covent Garden stage is because super-rich Maazel bought his way there by stumping up the production costs," while Rupert Christiansen in The Daily Telegraph dismissed it as "operatic fast food."

More sympathetic reviews appeared outside of the British media. Newsweek, which noted that, while the "score may occasionally sound more like an overblown film soundtrack than the meaty orchestration of an opera," the production "effectively conjures up the dispiriting emptiness of Orwell's awful vision. The unusual and inspired choice of a baritone, Simon Keenlyside, for the lead role of Winston, lends the work a darker edge." The Spanish newspaper La Vanguardia praised Maazel by stating "the maestro knows a lot of music and he shows it, just as he shows his prowess in orchestral and vocal work."

The opera's Royal Opera House engagement was sold out, as was a later engagement at La Scala in Milan, Italy.

The production was recorded for DVD release. Since February 2009, the DVD is also available for sale in USA.
