= Iain Bell =

English composer

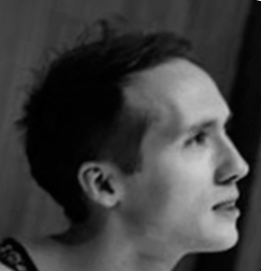
Iain Bell during the rehearsals of his opera in Vienna October 2013

Iain Bell (born 1980) is an English composer whose output is predominantly of vocal works, namely opera, art song or orchestral song.

== Life and career ==
Bell was born in London. His first opera, A Harlot's Progress, to a libretto by Peter Ackroyd, premiered on 13 October 2013 at the Theater an der Wien in Vienna, conducted by Mikko Franck and directed by Jens-Daniel Herzog. The cast included Marie McLaughlin as Mother Needham and Nathan Gunn as James Dalton. The lead role of Moll Hackabout was created by German coloratura soprano Diana Damrau for whom the composer has written a great deal of music.

Bell's second opera is an adaptation of Charles Dickens's own one-man version of his novella A Christmas Carol commissioned by Houston Grand Opera where it received its world premiere in December 2014, directed by the British actor, director and writer Simon Callow, sung by the American tenor Jay Hunter Morris. It had its UK premiere at Welsh National Opera in a new production by Polly Graham in December 2015. Bell's third opera is an adaptation of the 1937 First World War epic poem In Parenthesis by David Jones. It was commissioned by Welsh National Opera and received its world premiere in May 2016 at the Wales Millennium Centre with further performances at the Royal Opera House in a production by David Pountney conducted by Carlo Rizzi.

Bell's chamber music has been performed internationally at venues including Carnegie Hall, the Alte Oper Frankfurt and Wigmore Hall London, the last having commissioned a song cycle from him premiered in June 2014, setting extracts of Shakespeare's fools, entitled These Motley Fools. It was premiered by the American countertenor Lawrence Zazzo. The Munich Opera Festival commissioned Bell's A Litany in Time of Plague for chamber orchestra and the mezzo-soprano Tara Erraught, with whom Bell worked in his first opera A Harlot's Progress.

New York City Opera commissioned Bell in 2018 to write the opera Stonewall to commemorate the 50th anniversary of the Stonewall riots in 1969, to be premiered on June 19, 2019, and directed by Leonard Foglia.

== Works (selection) ==
Operas

- A Harlot's Progress (Vienna, Theater an der Wien, 2013), libretto by Peter Ackroyd (based on Hogarth’s etchings), with Diana Damrau and Nathan Gunn, production by Jens-Daniel Herzog, conducted by Mikko Franck.
- A Christmas Carol (Houston Grand Opera, 2014) based on Charles Dickens' own adaptation of his famous novella for public performance, with Jay Hunter Morris (tenor), Simon Callow (production) and Warren Jones (conductor).
- In Parenthesis (Welsh National Opera, 2016), based on David Jones’ eponymous book, directed by David Pountney, conducted by Carlo Rizzi.
- Jack the Ripper: The Women of Whitechapel (English National Opera and Opera North, 2019), libretto by Emma Jenkins.
- Stonewall (New York City Opera, 2019), libretto by Mark Campbell.
- Medusa (La Monnaie, Brussells, May 5, 2026), opera in two acts, libretto (after Hesiod's Theogony and Ovid's Metamorphoses, book 4) and direction by Lydia Steier, with Claudia Boyle (Medusa), cond. Michiel Delanghe.

Orchestra

- The Hidden Place
- A London Diurne
- A Litany in Time of Plague
- Beowulf, for narrator, tenor, chorus and orchestra. Barbican Hall, London, March 2023, with Ruth Wilson, Charles Styles, BBC Symphony & Chorus, Martyn Brabbins (cond.)

Chamber music

- The Undying Splendour
- Day Turned into Night
- Cradle Suite
- These Motley Fools
- Daughters of Britannia
