= Christiane Kohl =

German soprano in opera and concert

- Born: Frankfurt, Germany
- Education: Mozarteum
- Occupation: Soprano
- Organizations: Oper Zürich; Opernhaus Dortmund

Christiane Kohl is a German soprano in opera and concert.

== Career ==
Christiane Kohl was born in Frankfurt and grew up in Idstein. After her Abitur at the Pestalozzi-Gymnasium, she studied at the Mozarteum in Salzburg with Lilian Sukis and Elisabeth Wilke. She received her diploma with distinction in 2003.

In 2000, she made her debut at the Salzburg Festival as First Priestess in Gluck's Iphigénie en Tauride. In 2001, she appeared at the Wiener Kammeroper for the 90th birthday of Gian Carlo Menotti in his presence as Laetitia in his opera Die alte Jungfer und der Dieb. She was a member of the Zurich Opera from 2002 to 2009, performing such roles as Angèle Didier in Der Graf von Luxemburg, Elvira in Rossini's L'italiana in Algeri, the First Lady in Mozart's Die Zauberflöte, Gretel in Humperdinck's Hänsel und Gretel, Helmwige in Die Walküre, Iris in Semele, Lisa in Bellini's La sonnambula, and Musetta in Puccini's La bohème. In 2008, she performed the role of Christine in Intermezzo of Richard Strauss, conducted by Peter Schneider and staged by Jens-Daniel Herzog. A review in the FAZ by Holger Noltze translates to:

With clear articulation, great eloquence and the necessary resources Christiane Kohl met the demands of the role, continually switching through all the shades between parlando and singing, and between a well-judged bitchy tone and finely shaped lines.

In 2008, Kohl recorded in the Frauenkirche Dresden the Christmas oratorio of Gottfried August Homilius, with Annette Markert, Marcus Ullmann, Tobias Berndt, Sächsisches Vocalensemble and Virtuosi Saxoniae, conducted by Ludwig Güttler. With the choir Der Gemischte Chor Zürich she performed in 2008 Mozart's Requiem and Bach's Oster-Oratorium with the Tonhalle Orchester Zürich, and in 2010 Bruckner's Mass in F minor.

She has worked as a free-lance singer since 2009. She has performed since 2008 the role of Lisa in Lehárs Das Land des Lächelns at the Volksoper Wien. In the 2009-2010 season, she sang as a guest artist at the Kiel Opera House as Hanna Glawari in Die lustige Witwe.

Kohl made her debut at the Bayreuth Festival in 2009 in four parts of Richard Wagner, Klingsors Zaubermädchen in Parsifal conducted by Daniele Gatti, Woglinde in both Das Rheingold and Götterdämmerung, and Waldvogel in Siegfried, all conducted by Christian Thielemann. She repeated all those parts in 2010. In 2010, she sang at the Oper Frankfurt for the first time, the role of Helmwige in a new production of Die Walküre. In November 2010, she was the soprano soloist in Verdi's Messa da Requiem in St. Martin, Idstein. In February 2011, she performed in her hometown's Unionskirche the first soprano part of Mendelssohn's Lobgesang. In 2011, she performed the part of the Countess in Mozart's Le nozze di Figaro in Klagenfurt. She sang the title role of Mařenka in The Bartered Bride at the Komische Oper Berlin. From the 2011/12 season, she was a member of the Opernhaus Dortmund and appeared in the first production of director Jens-Daniel Herzog, as Senta in Wagner's Der fliegende Holländer, conducted by Jac van Steen, with Andreas Macco in the title role.
