= Marie McLaughlin =

Scottish operatic soprano (born 1954)

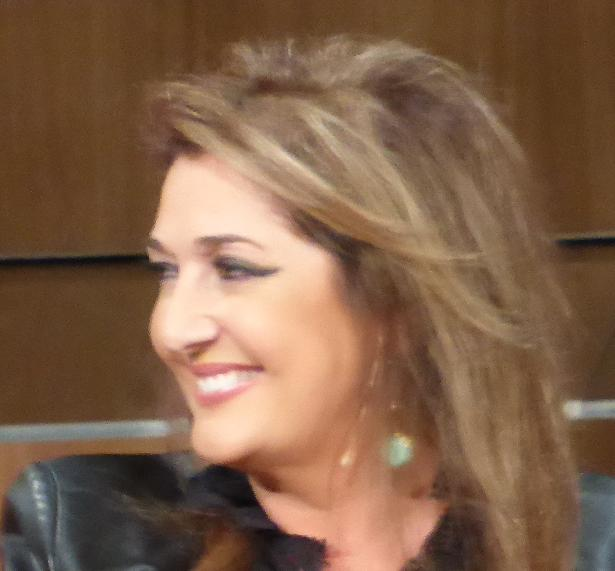
- McLaughlin in 2014

Background information
- Born: November 2, 1954 (age 71); Hamilton, South Lanarkshire, Scotland
- Origin: Scotland
- Occupation: Soprano

Marie McLaughlin (born 2 November 1954) is a Scottish operatic soprano.

A light lyric soprano, McLaughlin is noted for her performances as Susanna and Marcellina (Le nozze di Figaro), Zerlina (Don Giovanni), Despina (Così fan tutte), Norina (Don Pasquale), Marzelline (Fidelio), Nannetta (Falstaff), Micaëla (Carmen), Tytania (A Midsummer Night's Dream), Zdenka (Arabella), and Hanna Glawari (The Merry Widow).

== Career ==
Born in Hamilton, South Lanarkshire, Scotland, she studied in Glasgow and at the London Opera Centre, making her debut as Susanna in Le nozze di Figaro. After singing with Scottish Opera and the Welsh National Opera, she then appeared with the English National Opera from 1978, and at the Royal Opera House in London from 1980. Her international career has included guest roles at the Hamburg State Opera, Deutsche Oper Berlin, Paris Opera, Bavarian State Opera, and the Metropolitan Opera of New York, Vienna State Opera and the Salzburg Festival. In 2013 she appeared in the world premieres of The Perfect American by Philip Glass (Madrid) and A Harlot's Progress by Iain Bell (Vienna).

== Selected recordings ==
- Ivy Smith in On the Town conducted by Michael Tilson Thomas (Deutsche Grammophon CD, DGG 437 516–2, 1993)
- Despina in Così fan tutte conducted by James Levine (Deutsche Grammophon CD, DGG 4238972 1989)
- Micaëla in Carmen conducted by Bernard Haitink (Kultur Video DVD, KUL 2843)
- Susanna in Le nozze di Figaro conducted by Claudio Abbado (Sony Classics DVD).
- Zerlina in Don Giovanni conducted by Neville Marriner (Philips CD)
- Zdenka in Arabella conducted by Christian Thielemann (Deutsche Grammophon DVD)
- Violetta in La traviata conducted by Bernard Haitink (Image Entertainment DVD)
- Soloist in Suor Angelica conducted by Richard Bonynge (Decca CD, DEC 2894582182)
- Soloist in Mozart's Requiem conducted by Leonard Bernstein (Deutsche Grammophon CD, DGG 4273532 1989)
- Songs of the Makars with Billy Cowie (Divas Records)
- Schubert Lieder with Graham Johnson (Hyperion Schubert Edition 13, CD, HYP 33013, 1992)
- Richard Strauss Lieder with Graham Johnson (Hyperion CD, HYP 55202, 2005)
