= Richard Morrison (music critic) =

English music critic (born 1954)

- Born: 24 July 1954 (age 72); London, England
- Education: Cambridge University
- Occupation: Music critic
- Notable credits: The Times; BBC Music Magazine

Richard Duncan Morrison MBE (born 24 July 1954) is an English music critic who specializes in classical music. As chief music critic of The Times since 1992, he "has long been admired for his penetrating cultural column". He also writes for the monthly publication BBC Music Magazine and has previously written for Classical Music, The Listener and (as deputy editor) the Early Music journal. In 2004, he published a history of the London Symphony Orchestra entitled Orchestra: The LSO: A Century of Triumph and Turbulence; Charlotte Higgins of The Guardian described it as "a pungent, immensely readable first book."

== Life and career ==
Richard Duncan Morrison was born in London, England, on 24 July 1954. His first classical music experience was attending a 1960 London Symphony Orchestra (LSO) concert at the age of five. He was educated at University College School in Hampstead, and after studying music at Magdalene College, Cambridge worked variously as a pianist, organist, and trombonist. Despite two cycling injuries, he continues to perform music, particularly in Northern London. He is the director of music for St Mary's Church, Hendon, a church in the London suburbs.

Following his period at Cambridge, Morrison soon embarked in the realm of music criticism, first writing for the Classical Music magazine in 1978. In a few years, he gained two other posts, serving as a music credit for The Listener in 1982 and deputy editor of the Early Music journal in 1983. He joined The Times as a music critic in 1984, and has been the paper's chief music critic since 1992, succeeding music critic Paul Griffiths. Morrison also edited the arts pages for The Times between 1989 and 1999. Morrison "has long been admired for his penetrating cultural columns"; at both The Times (weekly) and in the BBC Music Magazine (monthly since 2004), he writes a column. His column at The Times is "noted for its humour and passion", while he was awarded "Columnist of the Year" in the 2012 Professional Publishers Association (PPA) for his column in the BBC Music Magazine.

Morrison published a history of the LSO to coincide with the orchestra's centenary in 2004. The book was entitled Orchestra: The LSO: A Century of Triumph and Turbulence and published by Faber and Faber. In her review of the book, the journalist Charlotte Higgins, described its narrative as "somewhat teleological", but concluded that "Morrison [...] has delivered a pungent, immensely readable first book."

In 2014 he was one of a number of British critics accused of sexism in their reviews of the mezzo-soprano Tara Erraught, who was singing the title role in a new production of Strauss's Der Rosenkavalier. Writing in the August 2020 edition of BBC Music Magazine, Morrison called for the dropping of three nationalistic songs, "Jerusalem", "Rule, Britannia!" and "Land of Hope and Glory", from the Last Night of the Proms, the last two being in his opinion "bordering on incendiary" in the context of the Black Lives Matter movement.

== Selected writings ==
- Morrison, Richard (2004). Orchestra: The LSO: A Century of Triumph and Turbulence. London: Faber & Faber. ISBN 978-0-571-21583-6.

=== Articles ===
- Morrison, Richard (22 February 2012). "Composed in Marble". The Times. Archived from the original on 23 February 2012. (subscription required)
- —— (19 May 2014). "Der Rosenkavalier at Glyndebourne". The Times. (subscription required)
- —— (5 April 2021). "Richard Morrison: London's conductor exodus will bring fresh opportunities to the city". The Times. (subscription required)
- —— (7 January 2022). "Why classical music can make you cry, according to various theories". The Times. (subscription required)
