= Kurt Ollmann =

American operatic baritone (born 1957)

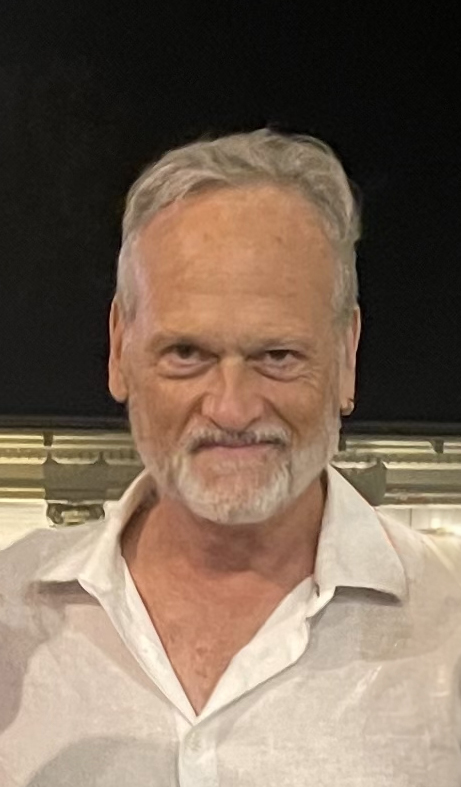
- Born: January 19, 1957 (age 69); Racine, Wisconsin
- Education: Bowdoin College

Kurt Ollmann (born January 19, 1957, in Racine, Wisconsin), is an American operatic baritone, known for his frequent musical association with composer and conductor Leonard Bernstein from 1982 until Bernstein's death in 1990. He has performed extensively, in opera, musical theatre, and solo recitals.

== Early life ==
Ollmann was born, and grew up, in Racine, Wisconsin. From age 12 to 14, he and his family lived in Paris. They then returned to Racine, where he attended Horlick High School. He attended Bowdoin College, graduating in 1977 with a degree in Romance languages.

== Career ==
After college, Ollmann moved to Milwaukee, Wisconsin to begin a singing and theatrical career. He studied singing with Marlena Malas, Yolanda Marculescu and Gérard Souzay. He also became a member of the Skylight Opera Theatre in Milwaukee.

In 1982 Ollmann moved to New York City. There he was introduced to Leonard Bernstein, and he performed in Bernstein's opera A Quiet Place in 1984. Ollmann was selected by Bernstein to sing Riff for the 1984 recording of West Side Story, which Bernstein was conducting for the first time nearly 30 years after he'd composed the music. A television documentary was made about these recording sessions. Ollmann sang the role of Maximilian for the recording of Candide, which was again composed and conducted by Bernstein.

In the 2000s Ollmann served as an associate professor of music at the University of Wisconsin–Milwaukee.

== Awards and honors ==
Both the 1984 recording of West Side Story and the 1989 recording of Candide won Grammy awards in the categories of Best Musical Theater Album and Best Classical Album, respectively.

Ollmann received an honorary degree in music from his alma mater, Bowdoin, in 1988.

== Personal life ==
Ollmann is openly gay.

In the 1990s Ollmann lived in Santa Fe, New Mexico, with his then-partner, director and A Quiet Place librettist Stephen Wadsworth. In 2000 Ollmann returned to Milwaukee.

His current partner is Bill Lavonis, an operatic tenor, whom he began dating in 2000; the two have sometimes performed together.

In 2014, he and Lavonis moved to Savannah, Georgia.

== Select discography ==
- Bernstein: On the Town, conducted by Michael Tilson Thomas, Deutsche Grammophon, 1993
