= On the Town (cast album) =

- Deutsche Grammophon CD, 437 516-2

Live album by Michael Tilson Thomas
- Released: 1993
- Venues: Barbican Hall, London
- Genres: Musical theatre and crossover
- Length: 74:33
- Language: English
- Label: Deutsche Grammophon
- Producer: Arend Prohmann

On the Town is a 74-minute live album of Leonard Bernstein's musical, performed by Tyne Daly, Meriel Dickinson, David Garrison, Thomas Hampson, Cleo Laine, Evelyn Lear, Marie McLaughlin, Kurt Ollmann, Samuel Ramey, Frederica von Stade, London Voices and the London Symphony Orchestra under the direction of Michael Tilson Thomas. It was released in 1993.

== Background ==
The album includes three numbers that were dropped from the musical before its première in 1944: "Gabey's comin'", "Ain't got no tears left" (a song that Bernstein later adapted into the "Masque" of his Symphony No. 2, The Age of Anxiety) and, in an appendix, "Intermezzo".

== Recording ==
The album was assembled from digital recordings of two semi-staged live performances given in June 1992 in the Barbican Hall, London.

== Cover art ==
The cover of the album was designed by Serino Coyne Incorporated.

== Critical reception ==
=== Reviews ===
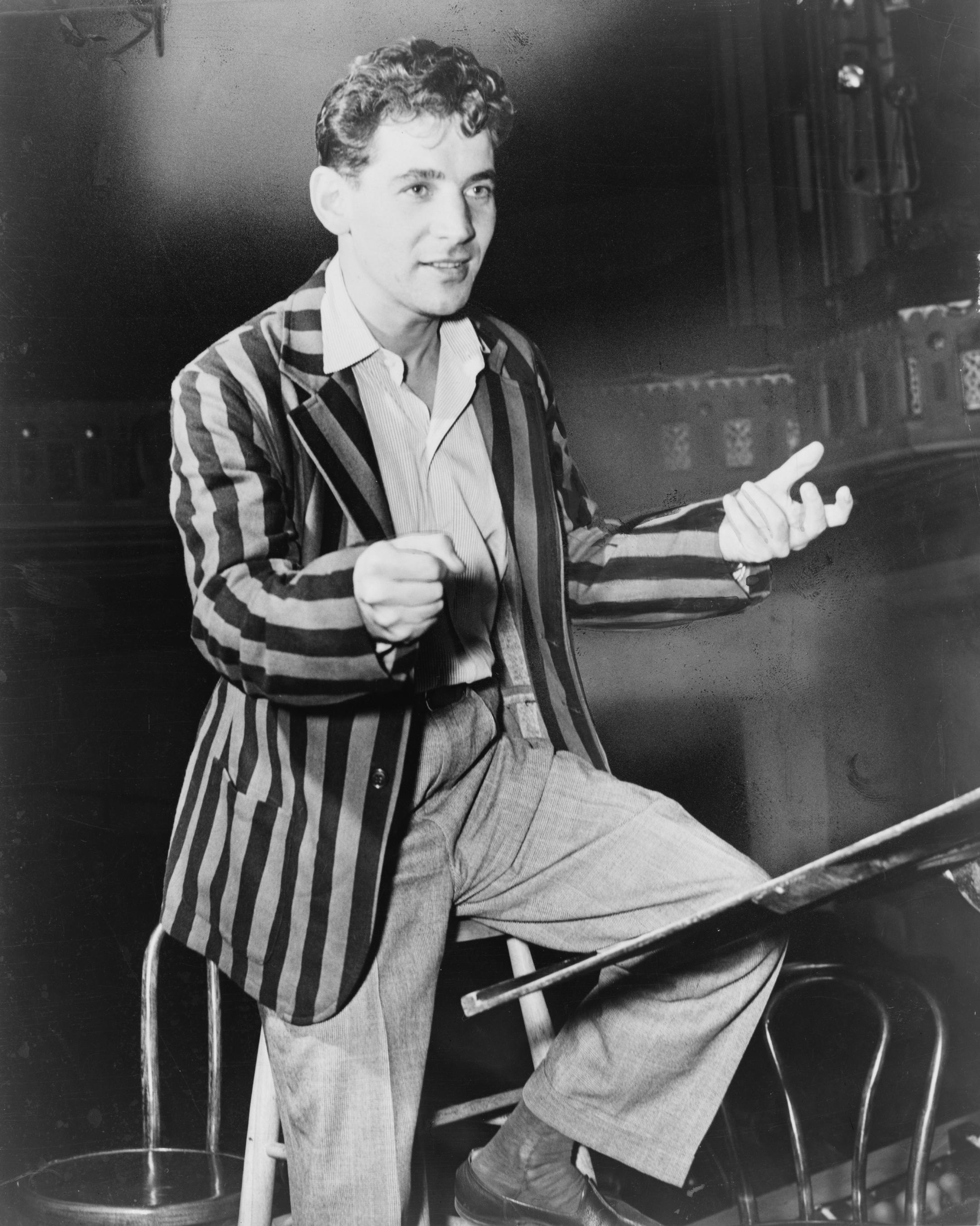
Leonard Bernstein in 1945, a year after On the Town was premiered

Edward Seckerson reviewed the album in Gramophone in October 1993. On the Town, he reminded his readers, was the first musical with a text by Betty Comden and Adolph Green and the first composed by Leonard Bernstein, yet was nevertheless "a peach of a show, a show which positively hums along on the heat of inspiration". A comedy about the romantic adventures of three World War Two sailors enjoying twenty-four hours of shore leave in the Big Apple, it explored the way in which transience brought people both sorrows and joys. The semi-staged production at which the album had been recorded over "two amazing nights" had been a thing as fleeting as the events that it narrated. There was no denying that the atmosphere of those two midsummer evenings could not be entirely caught on a CD, but Deutsche Grammophon's live recording had transmitted more of it than any studio album could have done.

Frederica von Stade was a "super-cool, dusky-voiced Clare", crowning her "Carried away" with a high C that no-one had imagined her capable of. Tyne Daly was not quite so successful as Hildy. In the Barbican Hall, she had "knocked 'em in the aisles with her huggable personality", but listeners to the album would notice limitations of her vocal technique that would have been less obvious to people distracted from them by her acting. It was true that her singing had improved since she had starred in Gypsy on Broadway. She was "terrifically spunky" in "Come up to my place", but she struggled with the syncopation and breath control needed for "I can cook too". A more expert artist would have been able to convey its sexual innuendo more effectively. Vocal difficulties were also evident in the performances of Cleo Laine as the Nightclub Singer and Evelyn Lear as Madame Dilly. So powerful were Laine's instincts that they kept one "hanging on every breath [she] takes", but her tone was somewhat "threadbare". And the casting of Evelyn Lear was "slightly sadder (even embarrassing)".

The album's male singers received positive recognition. Thomas Hampson's "Lonely Town" and "Lucky to be Me" were "handsomely sung with careful avoidance of that peculiarly 'operatic' articulation". Kurt Ollmann - something of a Bernstein specialist - was "excellent", and David Garrison was "the business" in his duetting with von Stade. Musically, the three sailors blended well, and dramatically, "you could put them on any stage and never look back". Samuel Ramey sang "gloriously" in "I feel like I'm not out of bed yet", a dock-worker's hymn to the dawn, and was "very funny indeed" in his second role as von Stade's stupendously tedious boyfriend. And "you haven't lived till you've heard Adolph Green's Rajah Bimmy sounding a little as though some middle-eastern voodoo chant has been processed through a ring modulator."

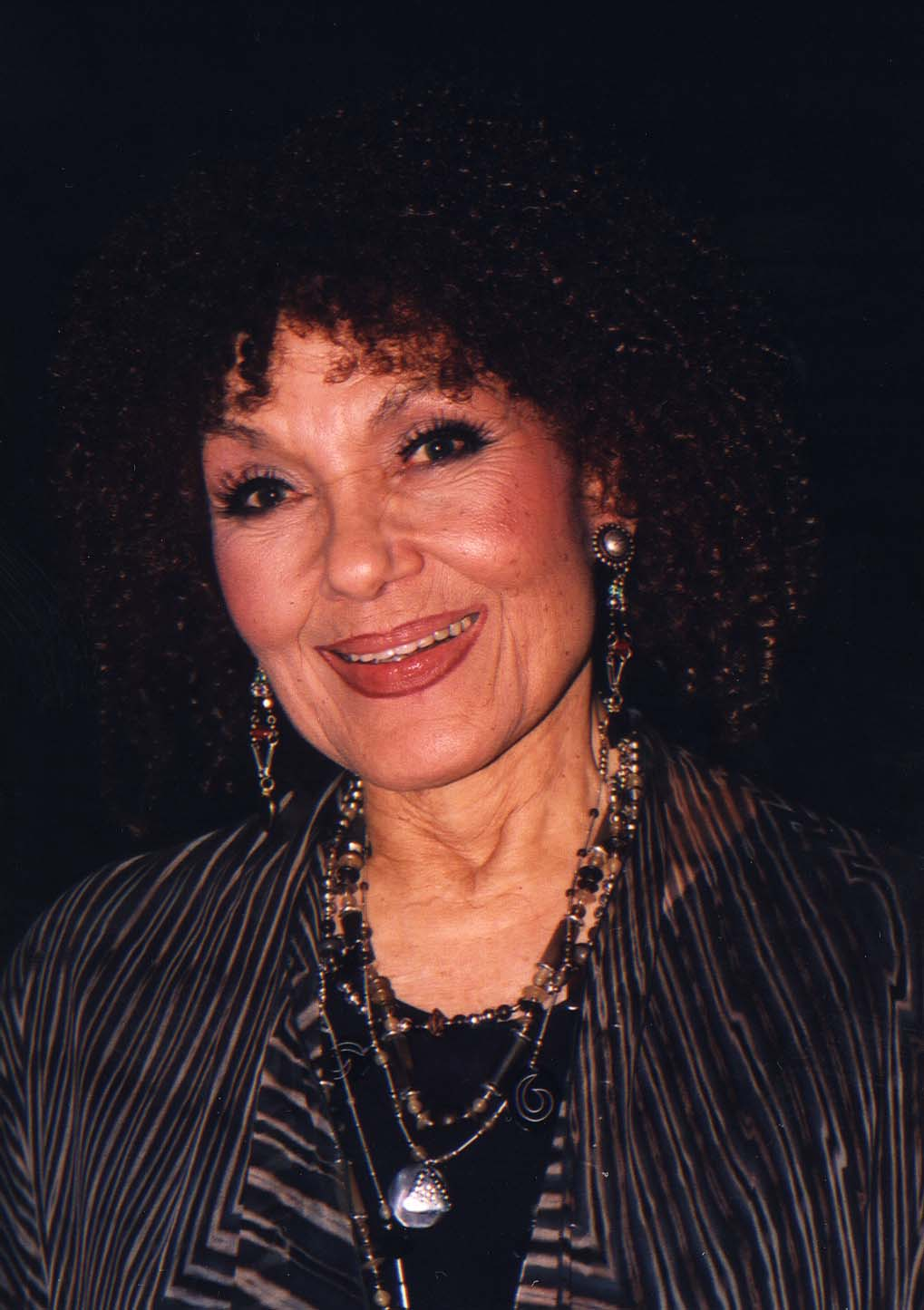
Cleo Laine photographed by John Mathew Smith

The "too, too English chorus" made delightfully "squeaky Charleston girls" in "So Long Baby", but were less believable in "Lucky to be me" or "Gabey's coming". The London Symphony Orchestra, by contrast, were entirely at home in Bernstein's territory, sounding less like a classical ensemble than a Broadway band in which "every last player [was] a character, an individual". Maurice Murphy's trumpet was "superb", John Harle played a "soaring, throaty sax" and "moody" clarinet music reminded one of paintings by Edward Hopper. In the musical's several ballet sequences, essential to its "sassy New York tinta", the orchestra was "stunning". Its performance of "Times Square" had "rhythms so hot and tight and idiomatic that you'd never credit this wasn't an American band".

Deutsche Grammophon's engineering was one of the album's few weak points, probably because of the inherent difficulty of recording singers moving around on a stage. The disc had a balance that was more appropriate to an opera than to a piece if musical theatre. Voices were balanced too distantly to allow either the principals' words or their personalities to make as much of an impact as they could have done. Cleo Laine was the only soloist who sounded as close to a microphone as was ideal. But this was merely a minor fault in a record for which the word great was inadequate.

In an appendix to his review, Seckerson gave an account of the album's Laserdisc sibling. The video disc had two advantages over the CD. Firstly, it allowed one to share more of what had been experienced by concert-goers in the Barbican Hall. One could see the soloists in close focus, and watch Michael Tilson Thomas "in action like a reincarnate Bernstein, coaxing, cajoling [and] intoxicating" his colleagues. One could also hear dialogue, an encore, audience reaction and narration by Comden and Green that the audio-only record had omitted. Secondly, the Laserdisc included material that not even the London audience had been able to enjoy - a series of interpolated film clips depicting New York in the 1940s. "Linking scenes, underlining musical numbers [and] lending visual impact", these montages of black and white or sepia footage showed the city "at play, ... at war, ... [by] day and night - zany, poetic, showbizzy, evocative".

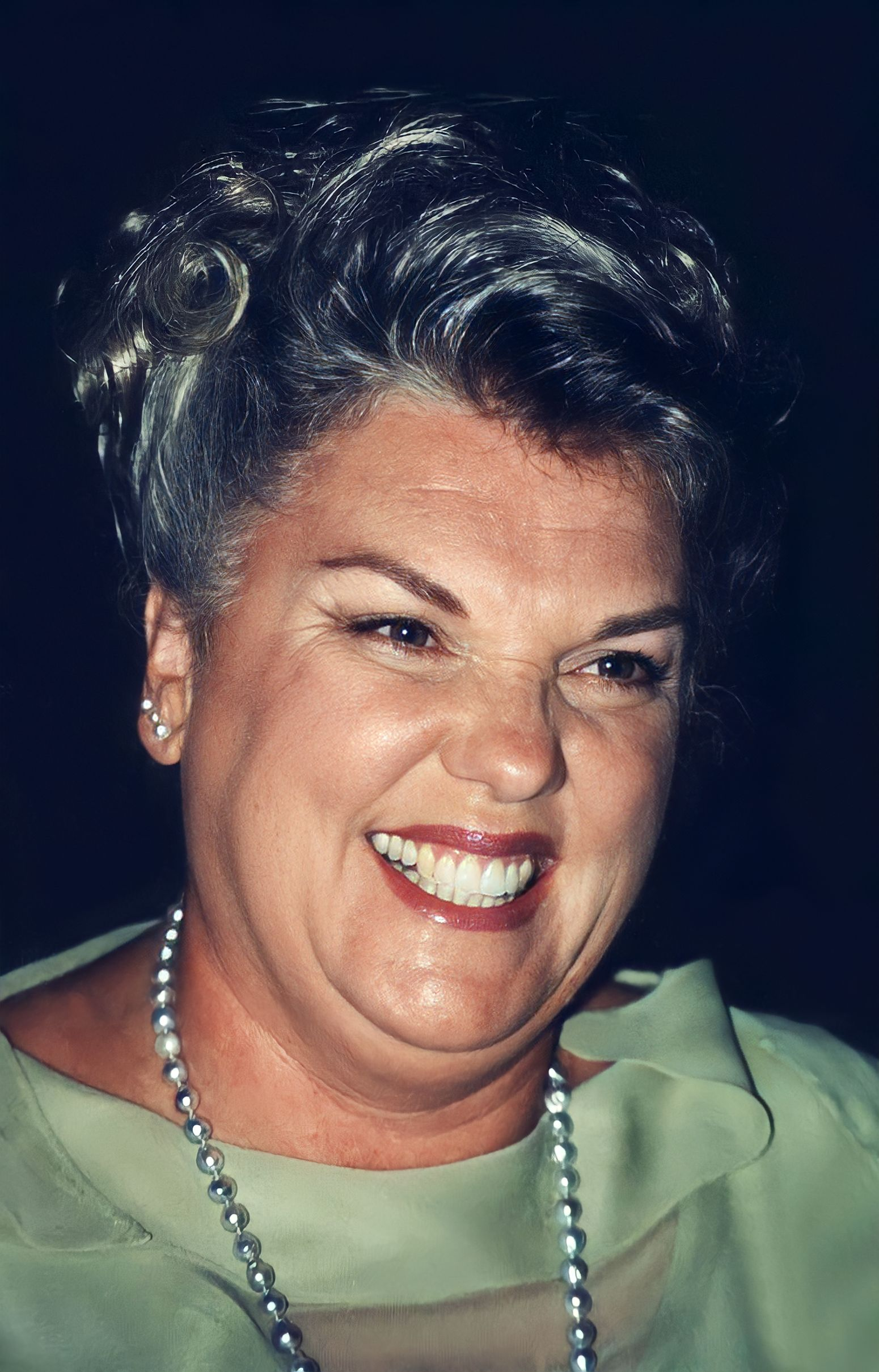
Tyne Daly photographed by John Mathew Smith

Eric Salzman reviewed the album in Stereo Review in March 1994. On the Town, he wrote, was a "wonderful piece of vintage New Yorkana, and the star-studded new recording led by Michael Tilson Thomas is fully worthy of it". Some historians regarded the work as revolutionary, but this was not really the case. It was not the first musical to be so complex, so mocking or so warm-hearted, or to borrow the structure of a revue. What distinguished it from other musicals of its era was not its form but its ingredients, and the way in which they had been combined. Bernstein had taken swing, jazz, the blues and the styles of Prokofiev, Stravinsky and Weill and fused them with a skill and energy that were peculiarly his own.

Like Bernstein himself, Michael Tilson Thomas was an amphibian who belonged as much to popular genres as to art music. His cast was just as much of a mixture. Among its truants from the opera house were Frederica von Stade, "hilarious" as a professor of anthropology; Evelyn Lear, "certainly a dilly" as Madame Dilly, a "No sex, girls" singing teacher; and Samuel Ramey as an (admittedly incongruous) dock worker. From the other side of the musical divide, Cleo Laine was a night-club singer and Tyne Daly, "the quintessential (if somewhat breathless) belting Broadway babe", played the central role of Hildy, the "predatory" taxi driver. In some other music theatre projects, operatic luminaries had sounded miscast, and it had to be admitted that Daly's singing was obviously different from that of her classically trained colleagues. But somehow Tilson Thomas's eclectic assembly of talents together made up "an idiomatic ensemble that's perfectly at home with those crafty Bernstein rhythms and vocal lines and that works together seamlessly".

The show had many well known songs, such as, "Carried Away", "Lonely Town" and "New York, New York", but was regarded by reviewers for its orchestral numbers. Half a century had not staled them, and the London Symphony Orchestra played them as convincingly as Americans would have done. Tilson Thomas elicited "maximum energy and punch" from his coworkers. There was admittedly something "cockeyed" about the album's marriage of opposites, and it inevitably had some tiny glitches that would have been edited out of a studio recording. But all in all, the disc worked "brilliantly", and it was a pleasure to hear On the Town "so well performed, recorded and mixed".

=== Accolades ===
In the Gramophone Awards of 1994, the album won the prize for the year's best musical theatre recording, and its VHS and Laserdisc versions won the prize for the year's best video.

== CD track listing ==
Leonard Bernstein (1918-1990)

On the Town (1944), orchestrated by Hershy Kay (1919-1981), Don Walker (1907-1989), Elliott Jacoby, Bruce Coughlin and Ted Royal (1904-1981) with the composer; book and lyrics by Betty Comden (1917-2006) and Adolph Green (1914-2002) with a contribution by Bernstein (in "I can cook too"), based on an idea by Jerome Robbins (1918-1998)

Act I

- 1 (2:07) "I feel like I'm not out of bed yet" (Three Workmen, Quartet, Ozzie, Chip, Gabey)
- 2 (4:00) "New York, New York" (Ozzie, Chip, Gabey)
- 3 (6:11) Presentation of Miss Turnstiles (Announcer, Ivy)
- 4 (2:06) "Gabey's comin'" - Pickup Song (Ozzie, Chip, Gabey, Girls)
- 5 (3:09) Taxi number: "Come up to my place" (Chip, Hildy)
- 6 (3:01) "Carried away" (Claire, Ozzy)
- 7 (3:30) "Lonely Town" (Gabey)
- 8 (0:39) High School girls
- 9 (3:13) Lonely town: Pas de deux, ballet
- 10 (2:35) Carnegie Hall pavane (Ivy, Madame Dilly, Chorus)
- 11 (3:03) "I can cook too" (Hildy)
- 12 (3:03) "Lucky to be me" (Gabey, Chorus)
- 13 (4:32) Times Square: Finale to Act I, ballet

Act II

- 14 (1:02) "So long, baby" (Chorus)
- 15 (0:55) "I wish I was dead" (Diana Dream)
- 16 (3:55) "Ya got me" (Hildy, Ozzie, Claire, Chip)
- !7 (3:16) "Ain't got no tears left" (Nightclub Singer) [lyrics by Leonard Bernstein; arranged for jazz trio by Michael Tilson Thomas]
- 18 (2:44) Pitkin's song (Pitkin)
- 19 (3:54) Subway ride and imaginary Coney Island
- 20 (1:33) The great lover displays himself
- 21 (3:08) Pas de deux, ballet
- 22 (4:30) "Some other time" (Claire, Hildy, Ozzie, Chip)
- 23 (2:59) The real Coney Island (Rajah Bimmy), ballet
- 24 (2:45) Finale to Act II (Company)

Appendix

- 25 (2:32) Intermezzo: "The intermission's great" (Chorus)

== Personnel ==
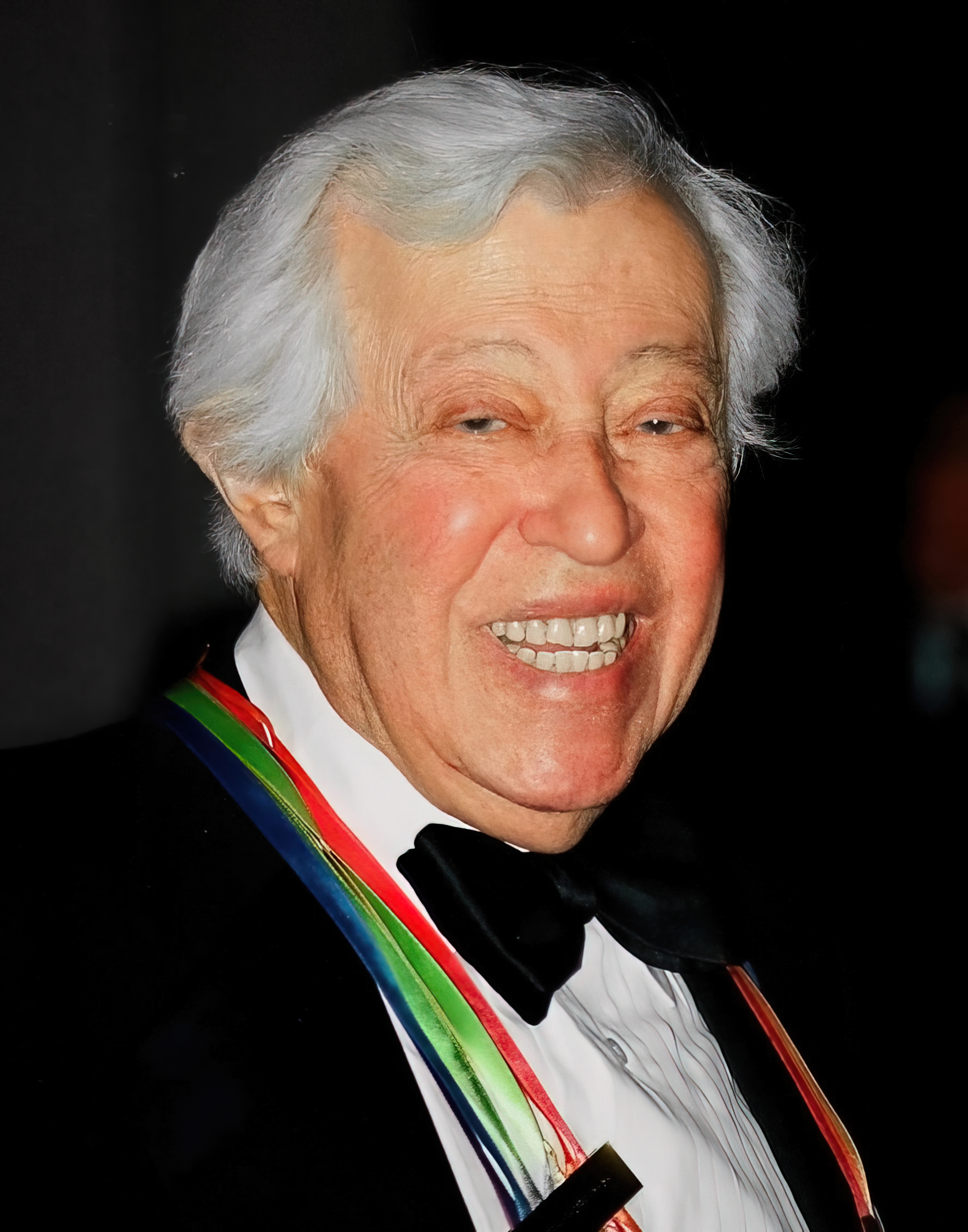
Adolph Green in 1998

=== Performers ===
- Lindsay Benson, Workman and New Sailor
- Stewart Collins, Workman
- Tyne Daly, Brunnhilde "Hildy" Esterhazy
- Meriel Dickinson, Diana Dream
- David Garrison, Ozzie
- Adolph Green (1914-2002), Rajah Bimmy
- Thomas Hampson, Gabey
- Cleo Laine (1927-2025), Nightclub Singer
- Evelyn Lear (1926-2012), Madame Dilly
- Marie McLaughlin, Ivy Smith
- Bruce Ogsten, New Sailor
- Kurt Ollmann, John "Chip" Offenblock
- Samuel Ramey, Judge Pitkin W. Bridgework, First Workman and Announcer
- Nicholas Sears, New Sailor
- Frederica von Stade, Professor Claire de Loone
- London Voices
- London Symphony Orchestra
- Michael Barrett, piano and associate conductor
- Michael Tilson Thomas, piano, conductor and music director

=== Other ===
- Alison Ames, executive producer
- Pål Christian Moe, co-producer
- Ruth Leon, coordinator
- Arend Prohmann, recording producer
- Helmut Burk, balance engineer
- Jobst Eberhardt, recording engineer
- Stephan Flock, recording engineer
- Ingmar Haas, editor

== Release history ==
In 1993, Deutsche Grammophon released the album on cassette (catalogue number 437 516-4), digital compact cassette (catalogue number 437 516-5) and CD (catalogue number 437 516-2). The CD was accompanied by a 44-page insert booklet including photographs of Bernstein, Comden, Green, Tilson Thomas and the cast, the text of the musical (in English only), notes by Ethan Mordden (again in English only) and synopses by Mordden in English, French, German and Italian.

Deutsche Grammophon also issued a 115-minute film edited from the same two semi-staged concerts at which the album was recorded, including intercut footage of New York City in the 1940s as well as an encore, dialogue and interlinking narration by Comden and Green that were omitted from the CD. The film was made available as both a VHS cassette (catalogue number 072 197-3) and a twelve-inch analogue video Laserdisc (catalogue number 072 197-1), but has not yet been issued as either a DVD or a Blu-ray.
