= Tara Erraught =

Irish opera singer

Tara Erraught (born 1986, County Louth, Ireland) is an Irish mezzo-soprano, a graduate of the Royal Irish Academy of Music (RIAM).

Erraught is known for her work with Bavarian State Opera, for which she has been given a Pro meritis scientiae et litterarum award. She stepped in on five-days' notice, learning the role of Romeo in Bellini's I Capuleti e i Montecchi at the Bavarian State Opera in 2011. In the seasons since, Erraught has sung a world premiere, made her US opera debut, numerous role debuts, and toured North America twice.

== Early life and education ==
Erraught was born in Ravensdale, near Dundalk, County Louth in Ireland; she has two siblings. She studied at Dulargy National School, which had a small orchestra, and then at St Louis Secondary School, Dundalk on the Dun Lughaidh campus, and with a singing teacher in Dundalk. She then pursued advanced studies at the Royal Irish Academy of Music (RIAM) working especially with Veronica Dunne.

== Career ==
Erraught has performed a wide variety of operatic roles including an acclaimed American opera debut with the Washington National Opera as Angelina in La Cenerentola; role debuts as Carlotta in Strauss's Die schweigsame Frau, Christa in Janáček's The Makropulos Affair, Despina (having previously sung the role of Dorabella) in Mozart's Così fan tutte, Prince Orlovsky in Die Fledermaus, Cherubino in Le nozze di Figaro, as well as singing Hänsel in Hänsel und Gretel with the Bayerische Staatsoper; Rosina in Rossini's The Barber of Seville. She created the role of Kitty in the world premiere of Iain Bell's A Harlot's Progress at the Theater an der Wien. In September 2017, she made her Metropolitan Opera debut singing the role of Nicklausse in Les contes d'Hoffmann and sang the role of Hänsel there later that season.

=== Octavian controversy ===
She was the subject of controversial reviews when she sang the role of Octavian in a production by Richard Jones of Der Rosenkavalier at Glyndebourne in 2014. Critics including Andrew Clark (in the Financial Times), Rupert Christiansen (in The Daily Telegraph), and Richard Morrison (in The Times) felt her physique and costume made her an implausible young male lover in this breeches role opposite Kate Royal's Marschallin. The reviews were described as "vicious" by Donal Lynch in the Irish Independent. Several other critics and performers supported Erraught.

=== Discography ===
With the Irish Baroque Orchestra she has recorded music from 18th century Ireland including several arias written for the soprano castrato Giusto Fernando Tenducci.

== Recognition ==
Erraught has received several honours and awards. In 2013 the Bavarian government bestowed upon her the Pro meritis scientiae et litterarum award in recognition for outstanding contribution to the arts - Erraught is only the fifth musician, and the youngest recipient, to be honoured with the annual award since its inception in 2000. In March 2010, Erraught was the recipient of Dublin's National Concert Hall's Rising Star Award. Other honours include first prize in the Jakub Pustina International Singing Competition in the Czech Republic, along with the Žďár nad Sázavou Audience Prize in 2008, and also in 2008, both the Houston Grand Opera and the Washington National Opera Prize at the International Hans Gabor Belvedere Singing Competition in Vienna. In 2007, Erraught won the Dermott Troy Award for the Best Irish Singer at the Feis Ceoil.
