= Xavier de Maistre (harpist) =

French harpist

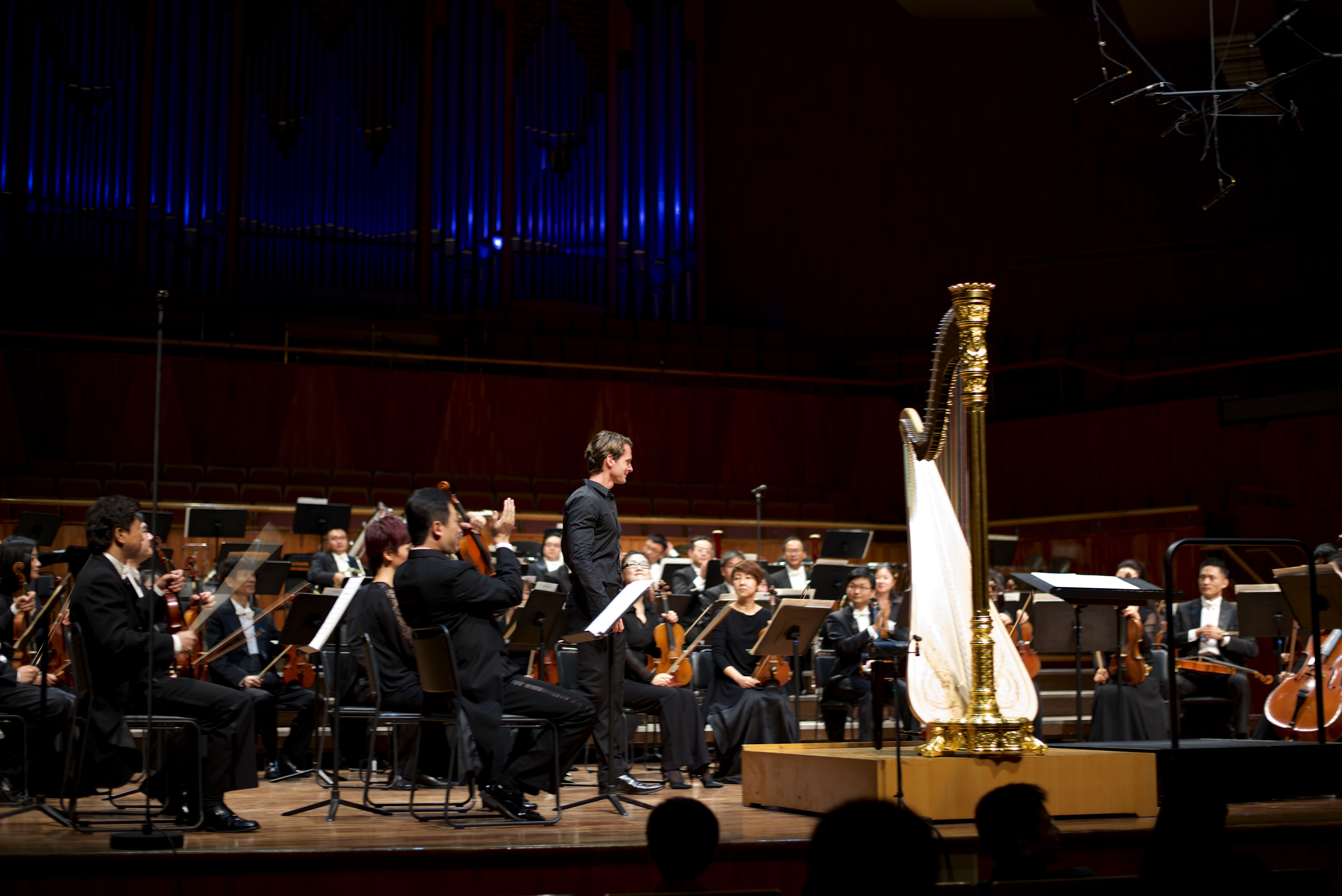
- Xavier de Maistre in a concert

Background information
- Born: October 22, 1973 (age 52)
- Genres: Classical
- Occupation: Harpist
- Instrument: Harp
- Labels: Deutsche Grammophon, Sony Classical

Xavier de Maistre (born October 22, 1973) is a French harpist.

== Early life ==
Maistre began studying the harp in his hometown conservatory in Toulon at the age of nine. Later he travelled to Paris to perfect his technique with Jacqueline Borot and Catherine Michel parallel to studying Political Sciences and Economics at the London School of Economics.

== Career ==
At the age of sixteen, Maistre won his first international competition in Paris, later winning awards at international competitions held in Cardiff, Munich, Vienna and Jerusalem. In 1998, he was awarded first prize and two interpretation prizes at the USA International Harp Competition. Later that same year, Maistre became the first French musician to join the ranks of the prestigious Vienna Philharmonic Orchestra.

As a soloist, Maistre has appeared with numerous orchestras under the baton of such eminent conductors as Riccardo Muti, Daniele Gatti, Sir Simon Rattle, Sir André Prévin, Heinrich Schiff, Antoni Ros-Marbà, Bertrand de Billy, Walter Weller, Gilbert Varga, Josep Pons and Philippe Jordan, amongst others. He became the first harpist to appear as a soloist at one of the Vienna Philharmonic's subscription concerts In May 2002.

Maistre has also been invited to perform at many of Europe's leading festivals, including the Schleswig-Holstein, Salzburg, Rheingau, Vienna and Verbier Festivals, the Budapest Spring Festival and the Würzburg Mozart Festival. Among the musical artists he has performed with are Kathleen Battle, Ingolf Turban, Anne Gastinel, Diana Damrau and Barbara Bonney; he has as well performed with actors such as Peter Simonischek and Andrea Jonasson.

Among highlights of a tour with the Vienna Philharmonic Orchestra with the conductor Daniele Gatti in 2009, Maistre appeared as a soloist at the Amsterdam Concertgebouw, the Cologne Philharmonie and the Vienna Konzerthaus. He also appeared in concerts with the Orchestre National de France under Riccardo Muti at the Théâtre des Champs-Élysées; a series of recitals with Diana Damrau at the Festspielhaus in Baden-Baden, Paris Opera, La Scala, and the Musikhalle in Hamburg and recitals with Bo Skovhus at the Semperoper in Dresden, the Tonhalle in Düsseldorf and the Musikverein in Vienna.

=== Teaching ===
Maistre has taught at the Hamburg Academy of Music since 2001. He additionally gives regular masterclasses at New York's Juilliard School of Music, Tokyo's Toho University and London's Trinity College of Music.

== Selected discography ==
Year	Title	Co-artists	Label
2017	Brigitte Klassik zum Genießen: Xavier de Maistre		Sony Classical
2018	Serenata Española		Sony Classical
2018	Debussy: Les Trois Sonates, The Late Works	Jean-Guihen Queyras, Alexander Melnikov, Isabelle Faust, Javier Perianes, Antoine Tamestit, Tanguy de Williencourt, Magali Mosnier	
2019	Kaija Saariaho: True Fire, Ciel d’hiver & Trans	Gerald Finley, Finnish Radio Symphony Orchestra, Hannu Lintu	
2020	Serenata Latina	Rolando Villazon	Deutsche Grammophon
2021	Christmas Harp		Sony Classical
2022	Gliere, Mosolov: Harp Concertos	Nathalie Stutzmann, WDR Symphony Orchestra Cologne	Sony Classical
