= Jean-Sébastien Côté =

Jean-Sébastien Côté is a musician and sound designer based in Aylmer, Canada. Originally a percussionist and accompanist for modern dance, he became interested in composing in the early 1990s and began collaborating with various choreographers in Quebec City. Since 1999, he has been working with Canadian director Robert Lepage, designing the sound and / or composing the music for many of his plays like 887, Playing Cards, Needles and Opium, The Blue Dragon, The Andersen Project, The Far Side of the Moon and Zulu Time.

He was also involved in Lepage's foray into other art forms: cinema (The far side of the moon), opera (1984) and dance (Eonnagata) and also composed music or did the sound design of various multimedia experiences and VR projects.

In 2017, he composed the music for Something about Wilderness, a choreography by Melanie Demers and Laïla Diallo for Swedish dance company Skånes Dansteater.

He received a Gascon-Roux award in 2006 and an Elliot Norton Award in 2012 for his work on The Andersen Project, another Gascon-Roux in 2014 for Needles and Opium and a Toronto Theatre Critic Award for 887.

He also released a record with musical partner François Therriault under the name crashride in 2015 to positive reviews.

Jean-Sébastien Côté now works at Transistor Média.
