= Jens-Daniel Herzog =

German theatre director (born 1964)

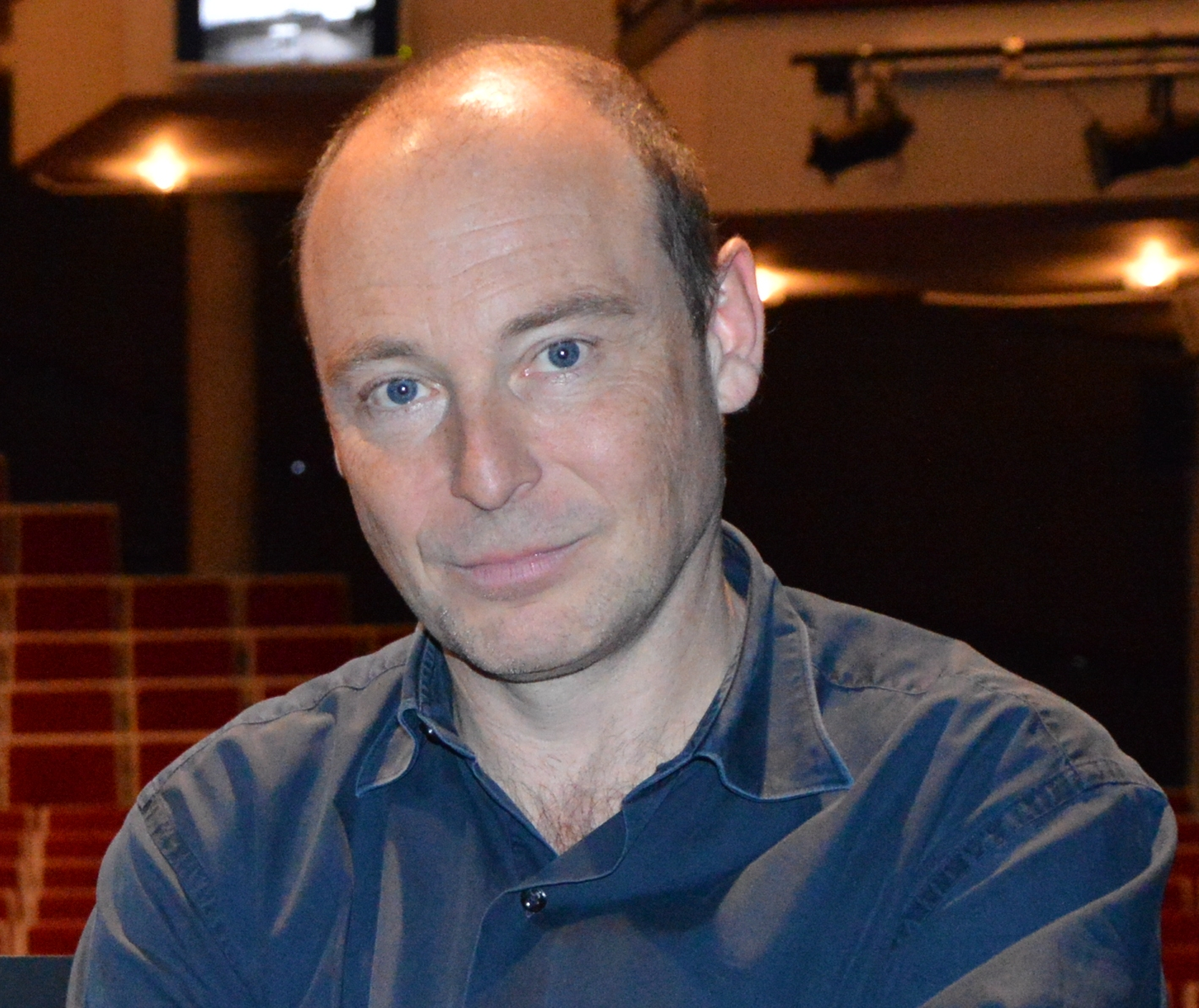
- Herzog in 2014
- Born: 12 July 1964 (age 62); Berlin, Germany
- Education: Free University of Berlin
- Occupations: Stage director; Theatre manager
- Organizations: Munich Kammerspiele; Zurich Opera; Mannheim National Theatre; Opernhaus Dortmund
- Website: jensdanielherzog.de

Jens-Daniel Herzog (born 12 July 1964) is a German stage director for play and opera, and a theatre manager.

== Career ==
Herzog was born in Berlin, the son of the actor Peter Herzog. He studied Philosophy at the Free University of Berlin.

From 1989 Herzog was an assistant to the stage directors Dieter Dorn and Hans Lietzau at the Munich Kammerspiele. In 1993 he directed there the premiere of Marlene Streeruwitz's New York. New York, in 1994 the premiere of Simone Schneider's Die Nationalgaleristen, also Die Nacht kurz vor den Wäldern (The Night Just Before the Forests) of Bernard-Marie Koltès. His production of David Mamet's Oleanna at the Schauspielhaus Zürich was invited to the festival Berliner Theatertreffen.

From 1995 Herzog was stage director and Oberspielleiter (stage director) at the Kammerspiele. He also staged plays at the Hamburg Thalia Theater, the Burgtheater in Vienna and the Schauspiel Frankfurt. His first opera productions were Wagner's Tannhäuser and Tchaikovsky's Pique Dame in Zurich. Tannhäuser, conducted by Franz Welser-Möst with Peter Seiffert in the title role, was recorded on DVD in 2003.

From 2000 to 2006 he was Schauspieldirektor at the Mannheim National Theatre and also staged there Mozart's operas Così fan tutte and Die Entführung aus dem Serail, and Wagner's Die Meistersinger von Nürnberg.

In 2007 Herzog staged at the Zurich Opera Humperdinck's Königskinder, conducted by Ingo Metzmacher, with Jonas Kaufmann as the King's Son, Isabel Rey as the Goose Girl, and Liliana Nikiteanu as the Witch. Herzog's 2008 Zurich production of Handel's opera Rinaldo, conducted by William Christie, was recorded on DVD, moving the scene from Jerusalem during the First Crusade to an airport lounge. In 2008 he also staged the "domestic comedy" Intermezzo of Richard Strauss, conducted by Peter Schneider, with Christiane Kohl as Christine, "the composer's formidable – and frequently hysterical – wife", Rod Gilfry as the composer, and Roberto Saccà as Baron Lummer. His first production at the Semperoper was in 2009 Handel's Giulio Cesare in Egitto.

Herzog has been director of the Dortmund Opera since August 2011, where he first staged Wagner's Der fliegende Holländer, conducted by Jac van Steen, with Andreas Macco in the title role and Christiane Kohl as Senta. In March 2012, he staged Mendelssohn's oratorio Elias, with Christian Sist in the title role, as a polit story, presenting scenes such as an intensive care unit, a beach party and a presidential campaign. Herzog staged Die Zauberflöte at the opening of the Salzburg Festival 2012, conducted by Nikolaus Harnoncourt.
