= Nicolas Testé =

French opera singer

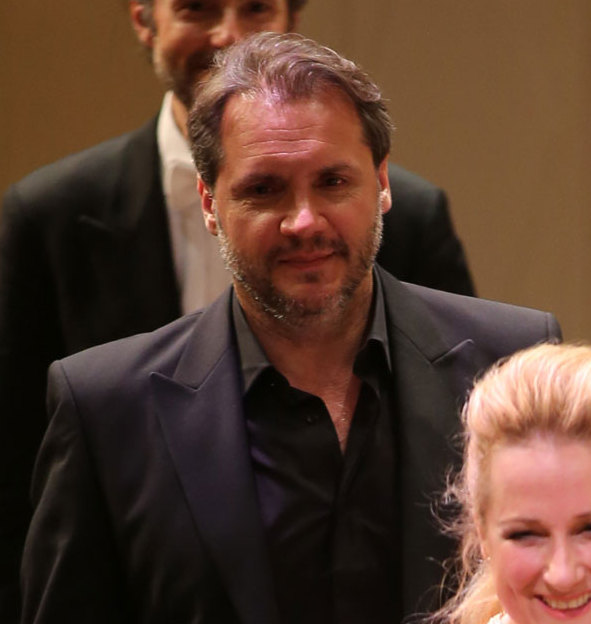

Nicolas Testé (born November 28, 1970) is a French opera singer in the bass and baritone vocal range.

== Career ==
Born in Paris, Testé first studied piano, bassoon and music history in Paris. He studied singing at the Paris Opéra and the "Centre de Formation Lyrique", among others. In 1998, he won second place in the "Voix Nouvelles" singing competition. The artist sang and sings on the opera stages of Milan, Munich, Leipzig, Geneva, Lyon, Berlin, Antwerp, Vienna and New York. etc. His role repertoire includes: Léandro (The Love for Three Oranges), Ferrando (Il trovatore), Masetto (Don Giovanni), Angelotti (Tosca), Colline (La Bohème) and Agamemnon (Iphigénie en Aulide) among others. In 2014 he appeared together with his wife in Lotte de Beer's much discussed production of Les pêcheurs de perles in Theater an der Wien.

Testé is also active as a song and concert singer. In this respect he has worked with conductors such as John Eliot Gardiner, Emmanuel Krivine, Charles Mackerras, Heiko Mathias Förster and Pinchas Steinberg.

The singer has been married to German soprano Diana Damrau since May 2010; the couple have two sons.
