= Diana Damrau =

German soprano (born 1971)

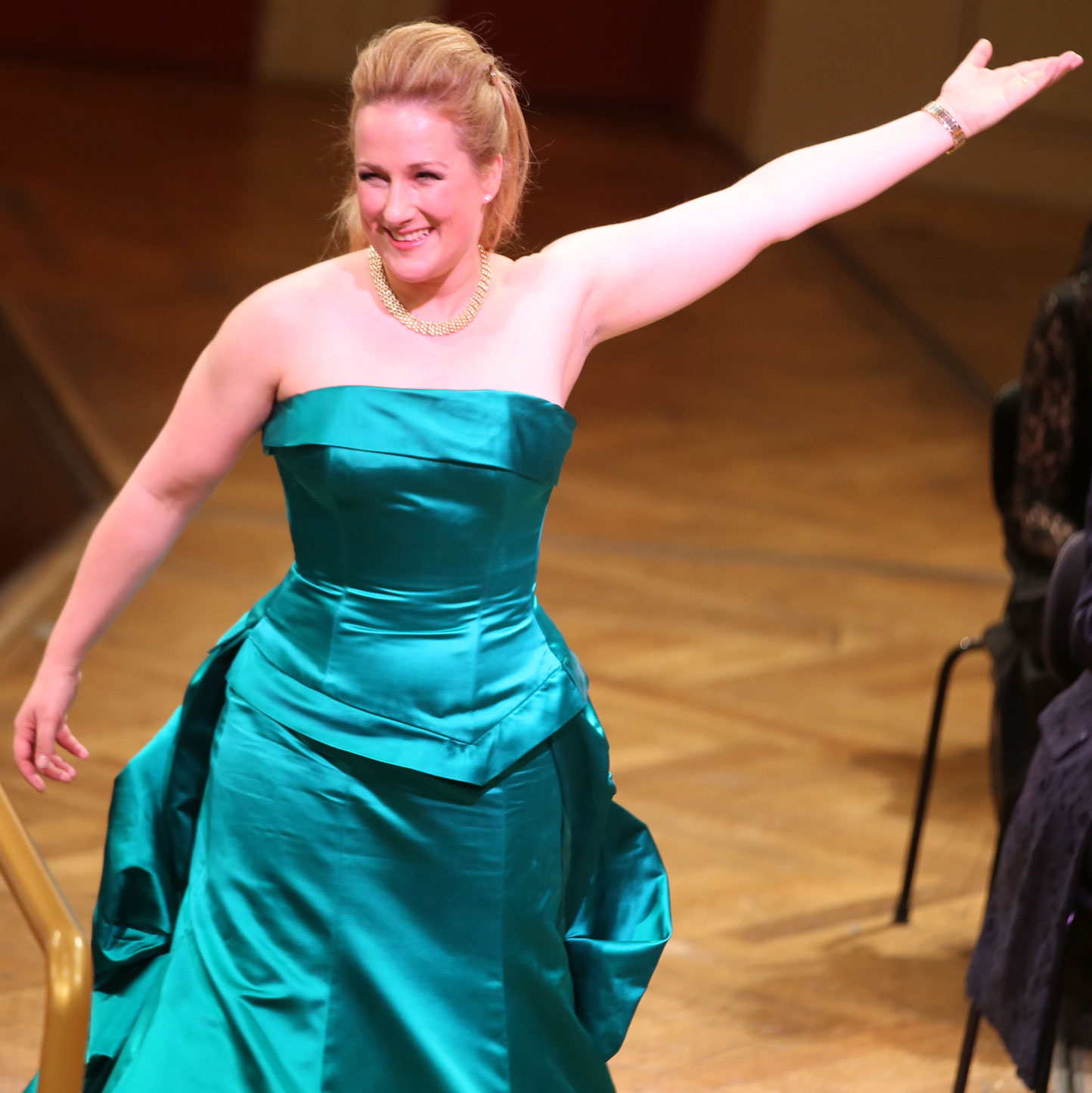
- Damrau in 2012
- Born: 31 May 1971 (age 55); Günzburg, Bavaria, West Germany
- Education: Hochschule für Musik Würzburg
- Occupation: Opera singer (soprano)
- Years active: 1995–present
- Title: Kammersängerin
- Spouse: Nicolas Testé (m. 2010)
- Children: 2
- Awards: Bavarian Maximilian Order for Science and Art; Bavarian Order of Merit
- Website: diana-damrau.com

Diana Damrau (German: [diːˈana ˈdamʁaʊ]; born 31 May 1971) is a German soprano who has achieved international fame for her performances, primarily in opera, but also in concert and lieder. She has been successful in coloratura soprano roles since her early career, and gradually proceeded into heavier roles of the 19th-century Italian bel canto repertoire. Her signature roles include the Queen of the Night in The Magic Flute, Zerbinetta in Ariadne auf Naxos, Lucia in Lucia di Lammermoor, and Violetta in La traviata.

Educated at the Hochschule für Musik Würzburg, she had been engaged at the opera companies in Würzburg, Mannheim, and Frankfurt. Since beginning her freelance career in 2002, she has been performing on leading stages frequently, such as the Bavarian State Opera, Vienna State Opera, and Metropolitan Opera, where she appeared in 12 consecutive seasons since her debut in 2005/06. She also leads concert performances with French bass-baritone Nicolas Testé, whom she married in 2010.

Damrau has recorded dozens of opera and lieder recital albums since signing to EMI/Virgin Classics (absorbed into Warner/Erato Records in 2013). She was invested as Bavarian Kammersängerin and has been awarded the Bavarian Maximilian Order for Science and Art and the Bavarian Order of Merit.

== Early life ==
Damrau was born in Günzburg, Bavaria on 31 May 1971. She was inspired to become an opera singer after watching Zeffirelli's 1983 film of La traviata, which featured Plácido Domingo and Teresa Stratas. She began her operatic studies with Carmen Hanganu at the Hochschule für Musik Würzburg. During her studies, she developed an edema on a vocal cord.

After consulting with several doctors, she decided to undergo an alternative therapy without surgery. The treatment lasted about one and a half years. After graduating from music conservatory she worked in Salzburg with Hanna Ludwig.

== Career ==
=== Early career, debuts, coloratura soprano roles ===
Damrau made her operatic debut in 1995 as Barbarina in The Marriage of Figaro at the Mainfranken Theater Würzburg. In the next two years, she was engaged at the same theatre, featuring as Eliza Doolittle in My Fair Lady, and then as the Queen of the Night in Mozart's The Magic Flute, her debut in that role, and in the world premiere of Salieri's Cublai, gran kan de' Tartari (1998). Next, she performed with the Mannheim National Theatre and Oper Frankfurt for two years each. She made her Bavarian State Opera debut in 1999 with Zerbinetta in Ariadne auf Naxos, and her Vienna State Opera debut with the Queen of the Night in 2000. In 2001, she made her Salzburg Festival debut, portraying the Naiad alongside Natalie Dessay's Zerbinetta; she became a regular in Salzburg and returned in the subsequent six editions.

Since 2002, she embarked a freelance career, and had frequent engagements with the Bavarian State Opera in roles such as Adele in Die Fledermaus, Marzelline in Fidelio, and the Queen of the Night. She took part in the world premiere of Cehra's Der Riese vom Steinfeld in the role of Small Woman in Vienna. Her engagements in Salzburg consist exclusively of roles in Mozart operas: The Magic Flute (Queen of the Night, 2002), Die Entführung aus dem Serail (Blonde, 2003; Konstanze, 2004), The Marriage of Figaro (Susanna, 2007). In the 2006 edition, which celebrated Mozart's 200th anniversary, she played the Queen of the Night in the premiere of Pierre Audi's production of The Magic Flute, and Fauno in Ascanio in Alba.

Damrau made her Royal Opera, London debut in January 2003, in David McVicar's new production of The Magic Flute, and then appeared in Arabella (Fiakermilli), Ariadne auf Naxos (Zerbinetta), and the world premiere of Maazel's 1984 in two consecutive seasons. At the Opera Frankfurt, she sang her first Konstanze in Die Entführung, a role she then repeated in Munich and Salzburg. In March 2004, she sang the role of Zdenka in Arabella for the first time in Munich. In December 2004, she was invited to sing the title role in Salieri's Europa riconosciuta, conducted by Riccardo Muti, for the reopening of La Scala in Milan. In 2005, she portrayed Gilda in the premiere of Doris Dörrie's controversial production of Rigoletto in Munich, and later in the year, made her Metropolitan Opera debut in New York City in the role of Zerbinetta.

=== Transition, more lyric soprano and bel canto roles ===
Damrau sang her first Susanna in The Marriage of Figaro in February 2006 at La Scala, and subsequently in Vienna. Apart from Konstanze in a new production co-produced with the Burgtheater, she had been featured at the Vienna State Opera in three consecutive seasons with several other roles. Since her debut in the 2005/06 season, she appeared in consecutive seasons at the Met, where she starred in new productions of The Barber of Seville (Rosina, 2006), Die ägyptische Helena (Aithra, 2007), and Rossini's comic opera Le comte Ory (Countess Adèle, 2011), besides revivals of Die Enführung aus dem Serail, Lucia di Lammermoor (role debut as Lucia), La fille du régiment, Rigoletto, and L'elisir d'amore. She made Metropolitan Opera history in the 2007/08 season by appearing as both Pamina and the Queen of the Night in different performances of The Magic Flute in the same run, after which she retired from playing the Queen, a role that she had sung in more than 15 productions.

She made guest appearances at the Teatro Real (Zerbinetta), Semperoper in Dresden (Gilda), Theater an der Wien (Pamina), Festspielhaus Baden-Baden (Sophie in Der Rosenkavalier). She continued to be associated with the Bavarian State Opera, with performances including a new production of Ariadne auf Naxos in 2008. In the 2008/09 season she returned to Royal Opera, London for Gretel in Hänsel und Gretel and Adina in L'elisir d'amore. The 2009/10 season saw her Rosina and role debut in the title role in Manon (Vienna State Opera), role debuts of Marie in La fille du régiment (San Francisco Opera) and Donna Anna in Don Giovanni (Grand Théâtre de Genève), and her last Konstanze at the Liceu, in the 2003 Christof Loy production she premiered.

Damrau has furthered her exploration of the bel canto repertoire with highlights including role debut in Elvira in I puritani in Geneva in January 2011, and the title role in Donizetti's Linda di Chamounix at the Liceu. She has since brought her portrayal in Donizetti's Lucia di Lammermoor to Berlin and Vienna. She premiered in a new production of Strauss' Die schweigsame Frau at the 2010 Munich Opera Festival, and portrayed all four heroines in Offenbach's The Tales of Hoffmann in a new production at the Bavarian State Opera premiered in October 2011. In May 2012, she returned to Geneva for Philine in Ambroise Thomas' Mignon. Following the birth of her second child in autumn 2012, Damrau returned to the stage with a new production of Verdi's Rigoletto at the Metropolitan Opera in February 2013; this was followed by her role debut in the title role of Verdi's La traviata in the same house. In October 2013, she sang in the world premiere of Iain Bell's A Harlot's Progress at the Theater an der Wien. In March 2014 she sang in La sonnambula at the Metropolitan Opera.

She debuted in the role of Countess d'Almaviva in the new production of The Marriage of Figaro at La Scala, which premiered on 26 October 2016.

She took up the title role in Maria Stuarda at the Zürich Opera House in April 2018. In 2019 she debuted as Ophélie in Hamlet in concert performances at the Liceu and later at the Deutsche Oper Berlin.

=== Concert career ===
As well as performing in operas, Damrau is a regular on the concert stage. She performed alongside Plácido Domingo at the concert program "3 Orchester und Stars" in Munich to mark the opening of the 2006 FIFA World Cup. She has performed lieder at Vienna's Musikverein, Carnegie Hall, Wigmore Hall, La Scala, the Schubertiade in Schwarzenberg, Bulgaria Hall with Sofia Philharmonic, the Kissinger Sommer and both the Munich and Salzburg Festivals, especially with Xavier de Maistre as her accompanist. Her concert repertoire includes Mozart's Great Mass in C minor, Requiem and Exsultate, jubilate as well as Handel's Messiah. She has performed with conductors as James Levine, Zubin Mehta, Lorin Maazel, Sir Colin Davis, Christoph von Dohnányi, Leonard Slatkin, Pierre Boulez, Nikolaus Harnoncourt and Jesús López Cobos.

== Personal life ==
Damrau married French bass-baritone Nicolas Testé in May 2010. They have two sons: Alexander, born in 2010 or 2011, and Colyn, born in 2012.

== Key performances ==
- La Scala: Europa riconosciuta* (Europa), The Marriage of Figaro (Susanna), La traviata* (Violetta), Lucia di Lammermoor (Lucia)
- Metropolitan Opera: La sonnambula (Amina), La traviata (Violetta), The Magic Flute (Queen of the Night and Pamina), Ariadne auf Naxos (Zerbinetta), Il barbiere di Siviglia* (Rosina), Die ägyptische Helena* (Aithra), Die Entführung aus dem Serail (Konstanze), Lucia di Lammermoor (Lucia), Rigoletto* (Gilda), La fille du régiment (Marie), Le comte Ory* (Adèle), L'elisir d'amore (Adina), Manon (Manon), Les pêcheurs de perles (Leila), Roméo et Juliette (Juliette)
- The Royal Opera: The Magic Flute* (Queen of the Night), Arabella* (Fiakermilli), Ariadne auf Naxos (Zerbinetta), 1984* (Gym Instructor / Drunken Woman), Hänsel und Gretel* (Gretel), L'elisir d'amore (Adina), La traviata* (Violetta)
- Bavarian State Opera, Munich: Les contes d'Hoffmann* (Olympia/Antonia/Giulietta/Stella), Die schweigsame Frau* (Aminta), The Magic Flute (Queen of the Night), Die Entführung aus dem Serail* (Konstanze), Arabella (Zdenka), Ariadne auf Naxos*(Zerbinetta), Rigoletto* (Gilda), The Marriage of Figaro (Susanna), Der Rosenkavalier (Sophie), Fidelio (Marzelline), Der Freischütz (Ännchen), Die Fledermaus (Adele), Lucia di Lammermoor* (Lucia)

NB: * indicates a new production of the piece

== Honours and awards ==
- 1999: Prizewinner at the 7th International Mozart Competition, Salzburg
- 1999: "Young Singer of the Year", voted in a critics' survey in the magazine Opernwelt
- 2004: Recipient of the "Star of the Year" by the Munich Abendzeitung
- 2005: Recipient of the "Rose of the Year" by the Munich Tz
- 2006: "Bavarian of the Year", named by the Bayerischer Rundfunk
- 2007: Kulturpreis Bayern of E.ON Bayern AG
- 2007: Bavarian Kammersängerin
- 2008: "Singer of the Year 2008" by the magazine Opernwelt, appearing on the cover of the magazine's 2008 yearbook
- 2008: German Record Critics' Award for her album Arie di Bravura
- 2010: Bavarian Maximilian Order for Science and Art, received on 17 November 2011
- 2010: Würzburg Cultural Prize
- 2011: Echo Klassik Award for her album Poesie
- 2011: "Musical Ambassador of the Günzburg district" (Musikalische Botschafterin des Landkreises Günzburg)
- 2014: "Female Singer of the Year" in the International Opera Awards 2014
- 2014: Klassik ohne Grenzen prize for her album Forever of the Echo Klassik award
- 2015: Entry in the Golden Book of the City of Würzburg
- 2016: Bavarian Order of Merit, received on 12 July 2017
- 2018: "Female Singer of the Year" of the Opus Klassik award for her Meyerbeer album
- 2020: asteroid 33034 Dianadamrau, discovered by the ODAS team in 1997, was named in her honor. The official naming citation was published by the Minor Planet Center on 9 January 2020 (M.P.C. 120069).
- 2021: Order of Merit of the Federal Republic of Germany

== Discography ==
Early recordings include Verdi's canzoni, Mahler's Des Knaben Wunderhorn, and Schumann's Myrthen, Op. 25, with the Telos label and live recordings of her summer 2005 Liederabend at the Salzburg Festival and her summer 2006 Liederabend at the Schubertiade are released on the Orfeo label.

Damrau also appears on Deutsche Harmonia Mundi's release of Mozart's Zaide in the title role, and performs in the trio finale from Richard Strauss' Der Rosenkavalier alongside Adrianne Pieczonka on Elīna Garanča's first solo release with Deutsche Grammophon.

Since 2007 Damrau has had an exclusive recording contract with EMI/Virgin.

- Arie di Bravura, her first release (2007) is a recital of Mozart, Righini and Salieri arias; Le Cercle de l'Harmonie, Jérémie Rhorer.
- Donna: Opera and Concert Arias by Mozart (November 2008) is a collection of Mozart opera and concert arias; Rhorer and Le Cercle de l'Harmonie.
- Coloraturas (November 2009). Munich Radio Orchestra, Dan Ettinger.
- Poesie: Richard Strauss Lieder (January 2011) is a collection of Richard Strauss' orchestral songs; Munich Philharmonic, Christian Thielemann.
- Liszt Lieder (October 2011) is a collection of classical songs by Liszt, accompanied by pianist Helmut Deutsch.
- Forever (2013) is a collection of operetta and musical theatre numbers; Royal Liverpool Philharmonic, David Charles Abell.
- Fiamma del belcanto (2015) is a collection of belcanto compositions by Bellini, Donizetti, Verdi, Puccini and Leoncavallo; recorded with the Orchestra Teatro Regio Torino, Gianandrea Noseda.
- Meyerbeer: Grand Opera (2017) is a recording of pieces by Giacomo Meyerbeer; Orchestre de l'Opéra National de Lyon, Emmanuel Villaume.
- Robert Schumann: Myrthen Op. 25 (2018). Iván Paley, Stephan Matthias Lademann. (Profil/Hänssler)
- Hugo Wolf: Italienisches Liederbuch (2019) with Jonas Kaufmann, accompanied by Helmut Deutsch
- Richard Strauss: Vier letzte Lieder, Lieder (2020). Mariss Jansons, Symphonieorchester des Bayerischen Rundfunks, Helmut Deutsch.
- Tudor Queens (2020). Antonio Pappano, Chorus and Orchestra dell'Accademia Nazionale di Santa Cecilia.

== Videography ==
DVDs are available of her performances in the following operas:

- Rossini's Le comte Ory (Metropolitan Opera)
- Verdi's Rigoletto (Semperoper Dresden, Metropolitan Opera)
- Verdi's La Traviata (Opéra National de Paris)
- Strauss's Rosenkavalier (Baden Baden)
- Humperdinck's Hansel and Gretel (Covent Garden)
- Mozart's The Magic Flute (Covent Garden, Salzburg Festival)
- Mozart's Ascanio in Alba (Salzburg Festival)
- Mozart's Die Entführung aus dem Serail (Oper Frankfurt)
- Mozart's Die Entführung aus dem Serail (Liceu)
- Mozart's Le nozze di Figaro (La Scala)
- Lorin Maazel's 1984 (Covent Garden)

Streaming videos are available at Met Opera on Demand of her performances in the following:

- Rossini's Le comte Ory (9 April 2011)
- Verdi's Rigoletto (16 February 2013)
- Bizet's Les pêcheurs de perles (16 January 2016)
- Gounod's Roméo et Juliette (21 January 2017)
- Verdi's La traviata (15 December 2018)
- Met Stars: Diana Damrau & Joseph Calleja (24 October 2020)

== Opera roles ==
Roles which have been fully performed on stage or in studio.

- Barbarina, The Marriage of Figaro (Mozart)
- Eliza Doolittle, My Fair Lady (Loewe)
- The Queen of the Night, The Magic Flute (Mozart)
- Aminta, Il re pastore (Mozart)
- Anne Dindon, La Cage aux Folles (Herman)
- Rita, Rita (Donizetti)
- Ännchen, Der Freischütz (Weber)
- Gretel, Hänsel und Gretel (Humperdinck)
- Marie, Zar und Zimmermann (Lortzing)
- Adele/Rosalinde, Die Fledermaus (J. Strauss)
- Valencienne, Die lustige Witwe (Lehár)
- Bread-Seller, Die Nase (Shostakovich)
- Alzima, Cublai, gran kan de' Tartari (Salieri)
- Gilda, Rigoletto (Verdi)
- Zerbinetta, Ariadne auf Naxos (R. Strauss)
- Norina, Don Pasquale (Donizetti)
- Johanna Barker, Sweeney Todd (Sondheim)
- Leïla, Les pêcheurs de perles (Bizet)
- Sophie, Der Rosenkavalier (R. Strauss)
- Adina, L'elisir d'amore (Donizetti)
- Marzelline, Fidelio (Beethoven)
- Fiakermilli, Arabella (R. Strauss)
- Small woman, Der Riese vom Steinfeld (Cerha)
- Blonde, Die Entführung aus dem Serail (Mozart)
- Konstanze, Die Entführung aus dem Serail (Mozart)
- Europa, Europa riconosciuta (Salieri)
- Zdenka, Arabella (R. Strauss)
- Gym instructor/drunken woman, 1984 (Lorin Maazel)
- Zaide, Zaide (Mozart)
- Rosina, The Barber of Seville (Rossini)
- Susanna, The Marriage of Figaro (Mozart)
- Fauno, Ascanio in Alba (Mozart)
- Pamina, The Magic Flute (Mozart)
- Aithra, Die ägyptische Helena (R. Strauss)
- Lucia, Lucia di Lammermoor (Donizetti)
- Marie, La fille du régiment (Donizetti)
- Martesia, Ercole su'l Termodonte (Vivaldi)
- Donna Anna, Don Giovanni (Mozart)
- Manon, Manon (Massenet)
- Aminta, Die schweigsame Frau (R. Strauss)
- Elvira, I puritani (Bellini)
- Olympia/Antonia/Giulietta/Stella, The Tales of Hoffmann (Offenbach)
- Linda, Linda di Chamounix (Donizetti)
- Adèle, Le comte Ory (Rossini)
- Philine, Mignon (Thomas)
- Moll Hackabout, A Harlot's Progress (Iain Bell)
- Violetta, La traviata (Verdi)
- Amina, La sonnambula (Bellini)
- Countess d'Almaviva, The Marriage of Figaro (Mozart)
- Juliette, Roméo et Juliette (Gounod)
- Maria Stuarda, Maria Stuarda (Donizetti)
- Ophélie, Hamlet (Thomas)
- Amalia, I masnadieri (Verdi)
- Anna Bolena, Anna Bolena (Donizetti)
- The Countess, Capriccio (R. Strauss)
