= Simon Keenlyside =

British baritone (born 1959)

Sir Simon Keenlyside CBE
- Born: 3 August 1959 (age 67); London, England
- Education: University of Cambridge; Royal Northern College of Music
- Occupation: Opera singer
- Spouse: Zenaida Yanowsky (m. 2006)
- Children: 2

Sir Simon Keenlyside CBE (born 3 August 1959) is a British baritone who has performed in operas and concerts since the mid-1980s.

== Biography ==
=== Early life and education ===
Keenlyside was born in London, the son of Raymond and Ann Keenlyside. Raymond played second violin in the Aeolian Quartet, and Ann's father was the violinist Leonard Hirsch. When he was eight, he was enrolled in St John's College School, a boarding school for the boy choristers of the Choir of St John's College, Cambridge and spent much of his childhood touring and recording with the choir under the direction of choirmaster George Guest.

He later attended Reed's School in Cobham, before studying zoology at the University of Cambridge. He returned to St John's as a choral scholar, before studying singing at the Royal Northern College of Music in Manchester. After graduation, he won a Peter Moores Foundation scholarship (1985) and joined the Royal Northern College of Music to study voice with the baritone John Cameron where he developed a love for lieder and German poetry.

=== Singing career ===
Keenlyside made his first appearance in a major operatic role in 1987 as Lescaut in Manon Lescaut at the Royal Northern College of Music. Opera magazine remarked on it being an "astonishingly mature" performance, and that he "used his warm and clear baritone with notable musicianship". The Richard Tauber prize, which he won in 1986, allowed him to go to Salzburg for further study. His money ran out before he could finish his four-month term there, but Rudolf Knoll, a teacher at the Salzburg Mozarteum, gave him private lessons for free. Knoll encouraged him to work on the Italian repertoire while he was still young, and introduced him to the Hilbert agency which got him singing jobs in Germany. His professional debut as a baritone came in 1988, at the Hamburg State Opera as Count Almaviva in The Marriage of Figaro.

In 1989, Keenlyside joined the roster of Scottish Opera, where he stayed until 1994, performing as, among other roles, Marcello (La bohème), Danilo (The Merry Widow), Harlequin (Ariadne auf Naxos), Guglielmo (Così fan tutte), Figaro (Barber of Seville), Billy Budd (Billy Budd), Papageno (Zauberflöte) and Belcore (L'elisir d'amore).

During this period, he made debut performances at the Royal Opera House at Covent Garden, (1989 singing Silvio), English National Opera (Guglielmo), Welsh National Opera, San Francisco Opera, Geneva, Paris, and Sydney. He sang for Glyndebourne for the first time in 1993 and made his debut at the Metropolitan Opera in New York in 1996. Keenlyside has performed at virtually all the major opera houses in the world, including the Paris Opera and the Metropolitan Opera.

Keenlyside sang in the world premieres of two 21st-century operas, creating the roles of Prospero in Thomas Adès' The Tempest in 2004, and Winston Smith in Lorin Maazel's 1984 in 2005. He later participated in the EMI Classics world premiere recording of The Tempest.

In 2010 Keenlyside sang the role of Rodrigo in a new production of Don Carlo at the Metropolitan Opera opposite Roberto Alagna to critical acclaim.

Keenlyside added the role of Golaud in Debussy's Pelléas et Mélisande to his repertoire in a new production which premiered at Wiener Staatsoper on 18 June 2017 (he previously sang the role of Pelléas for many years). The following afternoon, he was awarded the title of Kammersänger by the Austrian government in a ceremony in the Teesalon of the opera house. He sang his first Falstaff in Verdi's opera in September 2025 at La Monnaie in Brussels "with effortless brilliance, his resonant, rounded voice and natural authority giving the character both warmth and depth".

His recordings include several issues for Hyperion Records, including music of Benjamin Britten, Emmanuel Chabrier, Maurice Duruflé and Henry Purcell. He is also a featured singer on five volumes of the Hyperion Franz Schubert Edition and on the second volume of the Hyperion Robert Schumann Edition. In 2007 Sony Music released a recital disc of arias entitled Tales of Opera.

=== Personal life ===
Keenlyside is married to the Royal Ballet former principal dancer Zenaida Yanowsky. Simon and Zenaida had their first child, a son called Owen, on 12 October 2008. Their second child, a daughter called Iona, was born on 7 March 2010.

== Operatic roles ==
- Winston Smith in 1984
- Harlequin in Ariadne auf Naxos
- Ubalde in Armide
- Figaro and Fiorello in The Barber of Seville
- Billy Budd and Donald in Billy Budd
- Marcello and Schaunard in La bohème
- Catechiste in Briséïs
- Mercurio in La Calisto
- Olivier in Capriccio
- Morales in Carmen
- Dandini in La Cenerentola
- Guglielmo in Così fan tutte
- Abayaldos in Dom Sébastien
- Posa and Flemish Deputy in Don Carlos
- Don Giovanni in Don Giovanni
- Belcore in L'elisir d'amore
- Onegin in Eugene Onegin
- Ford in Falstaff
- Valentin and Wagner in Faust
- Prisoner in Fidelio
- Falke in Die Fledermaus
- Hamlet in Ambroise Thomas' Hamlet
- Oreste in Iphigénie en Tauride
- Macbeth in Macbeth
- Gendarme/Le directeur in Les Mamelles de Tirésias
- Lescaut in Manon Lescaut
- Count Almaviva in The Marriage of Figaro
- Nightwatchman in Die Meistersinger von Nürnberg
- Danilo in The Merry Widow
- Orfeo in Monteverdi's L'Orfeo, favola in musica
- Montano in Verdi's Otello
- Silvio in Pagliacci
- Pelléas in Pelléas et Mélisande
- Golaud in Pelléas et Mélisande
- Ned Keene in Peter Grimes
- Prince Yeletski in The Queen of Spades
- Tarquinius in The Rape of Lucretia
- Rigoletto in Rigoletto
- Arthus in Le Roi Arthus
- Wolfram in Tannhäuser
- Prospero in The Tempest
- Giorgio Germont in Traviata
- Steersman in Tristan und Isolde
- Ping in Turandot
- Andrei in Prokofiev's War and Peace
- Wozzeck in Wozzeck
- Papageno in Die Zauberflöte

== Honours and awards ==
- 1986: Richard Tauber Prize
- 1987: Winner of the Walther Gruner International Lieder competition
- 1990: First Prize, Elly Ameling competition
- 1994: Singer of the Year Award from the Royal Philharmonic Society
- 2003: Appointed Commander of the Order of the British Empire (CBE) in the Birthday Honours for services to Music
- 2004: Opera Award for the category Best Baritone (Don Giovanni, Théâtre de la Monnaie) from the Italian magazine L'Opera.
- 2004: XII Premios de la Crítica award to Simon Keenlyside and Natalie Dessay in Hamlet for the best male and female singers in a staged opera.
- 2005: Grammy Award for Best Opera Recording Marriage of Figaro
- 2006: Laurence Olivier Award for Outstanding Achievement in Opera, for his work in the ROH production of 1984 and ENO's Billy Budd in 2005. He was a nominee for this award in 2004 for The Royal Opera's Hamlet and Die Zauberflote.
- 2007: ECHO Klassik Award, Singer of the Year (male)
- 2007: XV Premios de la Crítica award for Best Recital Artist
- 2007: Gramophone Award, Best of Category (Recital) for his debut recital album Tales of Opera
- 2010: Gramophone Award, Best of Category (Contemporary) for the CD The Tempest, singing Prospero
- 2011: Musical America's Vocalist of the Year award
- 2017: Austrian Kammersänger
- 2018: Knighted in the 2018 Birthday Honours for services to Music
