= Nancy Gustafson =

Singer

Nancy Gustafson (born June 27, 1956, in Evanston, Illinois) is an American opera singer.

She received her B.A. from Mount Holyoke College in 1978 and her M.Mus. from Northwestern University. She has appeared in numerous productions at venues both in the United States (including the Lyric Opera of Chicago and the Metropolitan Opera) and in Europe (including Milan's La Scala, London's Covent Garden, and the Paris Opera). She has performed with Plácido Domingo, José Carreras, Luciano Pavarotti, Andrea Bocelli and Joan Sutherland in numerous productions.

In Vienna, Austria, she was honored with the title Kammersängerin by the Vienna State Opera. In 2005 in London, she appeared in the world premiere of the opera 1984, based upon the famous novel by George Orwell. In 2006, she was appointed artist-in-residence at Northwestern University's Bienen School of Music.

Gustafson founded the Songs By Heart Foundation in 2015. The program provides live, interactive vocal music programs to people with memory loss.
