= Richard Margison =

Canadian opera singer

Richard Charles Margison
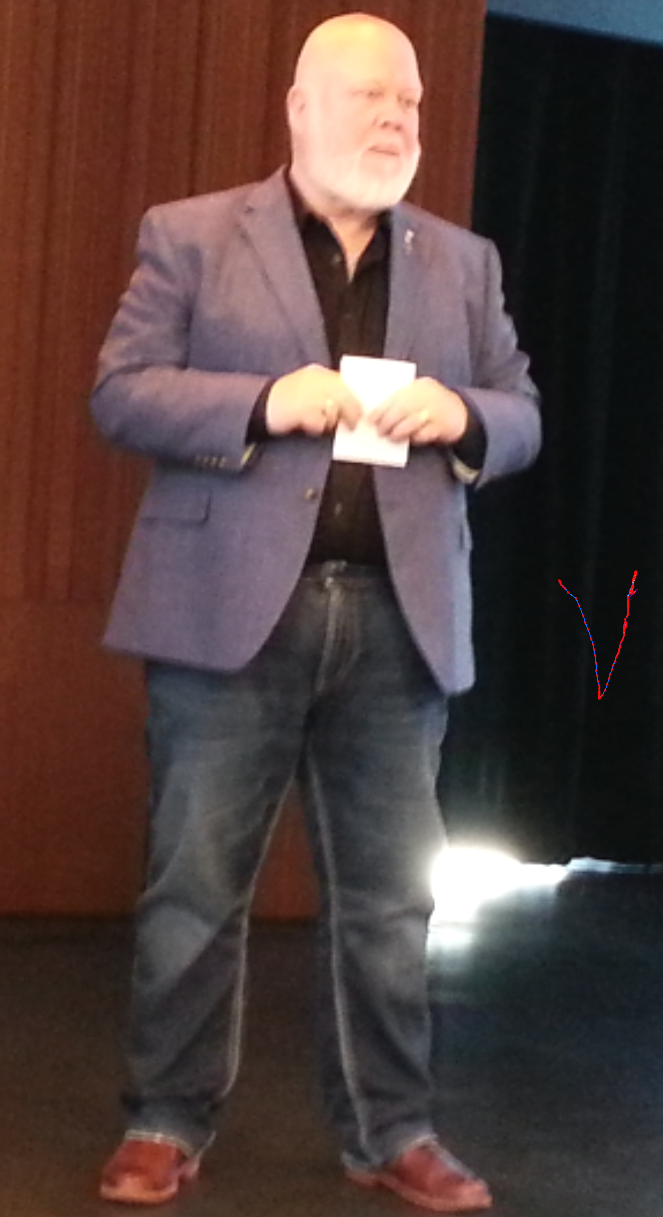
- Richard Margison photographed in Montréal, Québec, Canada at the Serge-Garant Hall of Université de Montréal.
- Born: 16 July 1953 (age 72); Victoria, British Columbia
- Occupation: Dramatic tenor
- Known for: Operatic tenor
- Awards: Order of Canada

Richard Charles Margison, OC (born 16 July 1953) is a Canadian operatic tenor and lives in Stouffville, Ontario, Canada.

== Background ==
Margison began his career in Victoria, BC, where, he sang folk songs in the coffeehouses and clubs. He appeared on CBC's Search for the Stars in 1981.

== Highlands Opera Studio ==
In 2007, Margison and opera director Valerie Kuinka founded the Highlands Opera Studio, a training program for emerging operatic professionals.

== Honours ==
Margison was named an Officer of the Order of Canada in 2001 and was inducted into the Canadian Opera Hall of Fame in 2003. Margison received the Queen Elizabeth II Golden Jubilee Medal in 2002 and Queen Elizabeth II Diamond Jubilee Medal in 2012.
