= Ludwig Güttler =

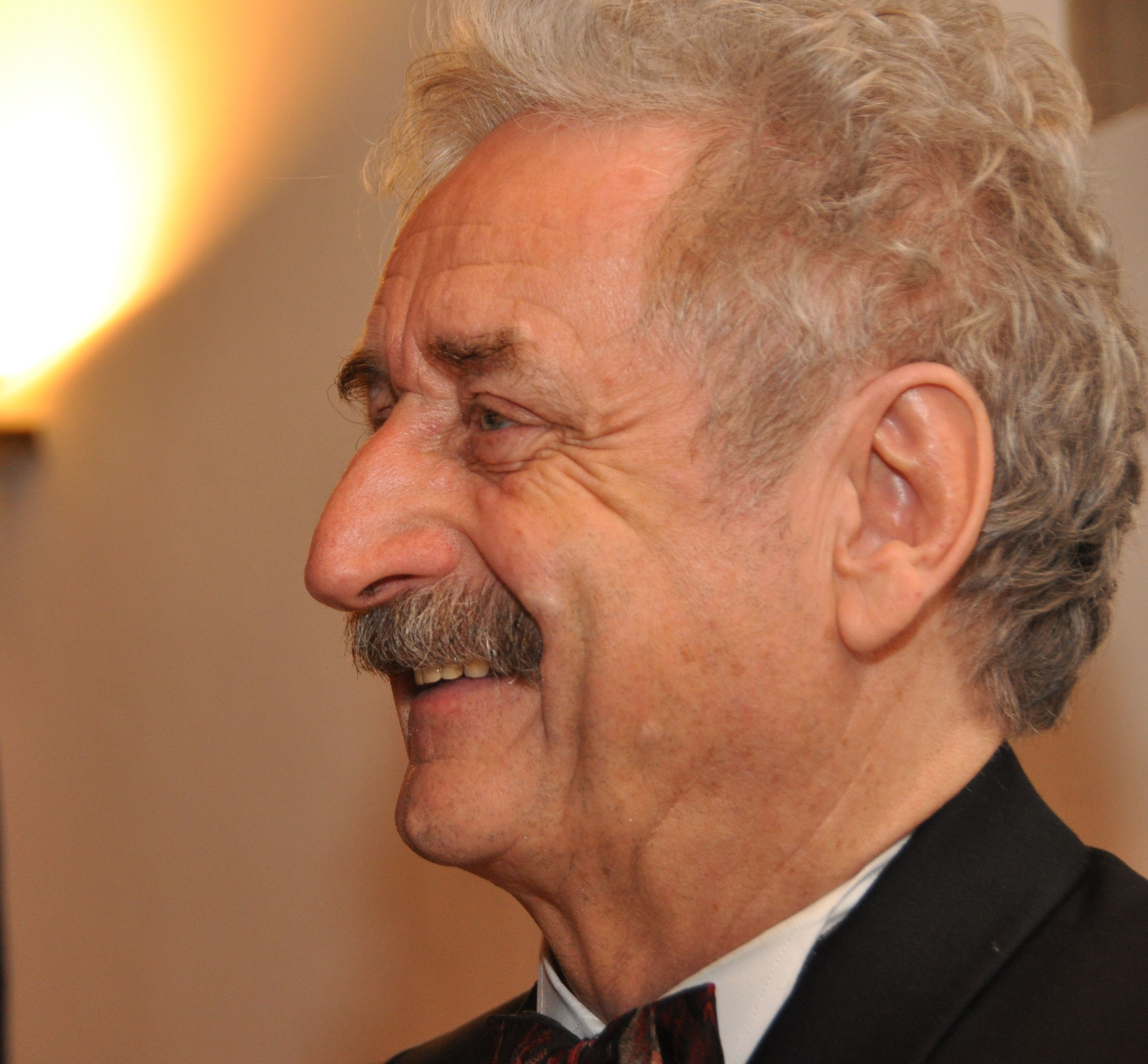
Ludwig Güttler 2015 after a concert in Koblenz

Ludwig Güttler (born 13 June 1943) is an internationally known German virtuoso on the Baroque trumpet, the piccolo trumpet and the corno da caccia. As a conductor, he founded several ensembles including the chamber orchestra Virtuosi Saxoniae. His name is sometimes written in English as Ludwig Guttler.

He received a number of awards including Discovery of the Year in 1983, and Frankfurt's Musikpreis for extraordinary achievements in 1989. He was a founding member of the Rheingau Musik Festival, Hesse, and has appeared regularly since the first season in 1988.

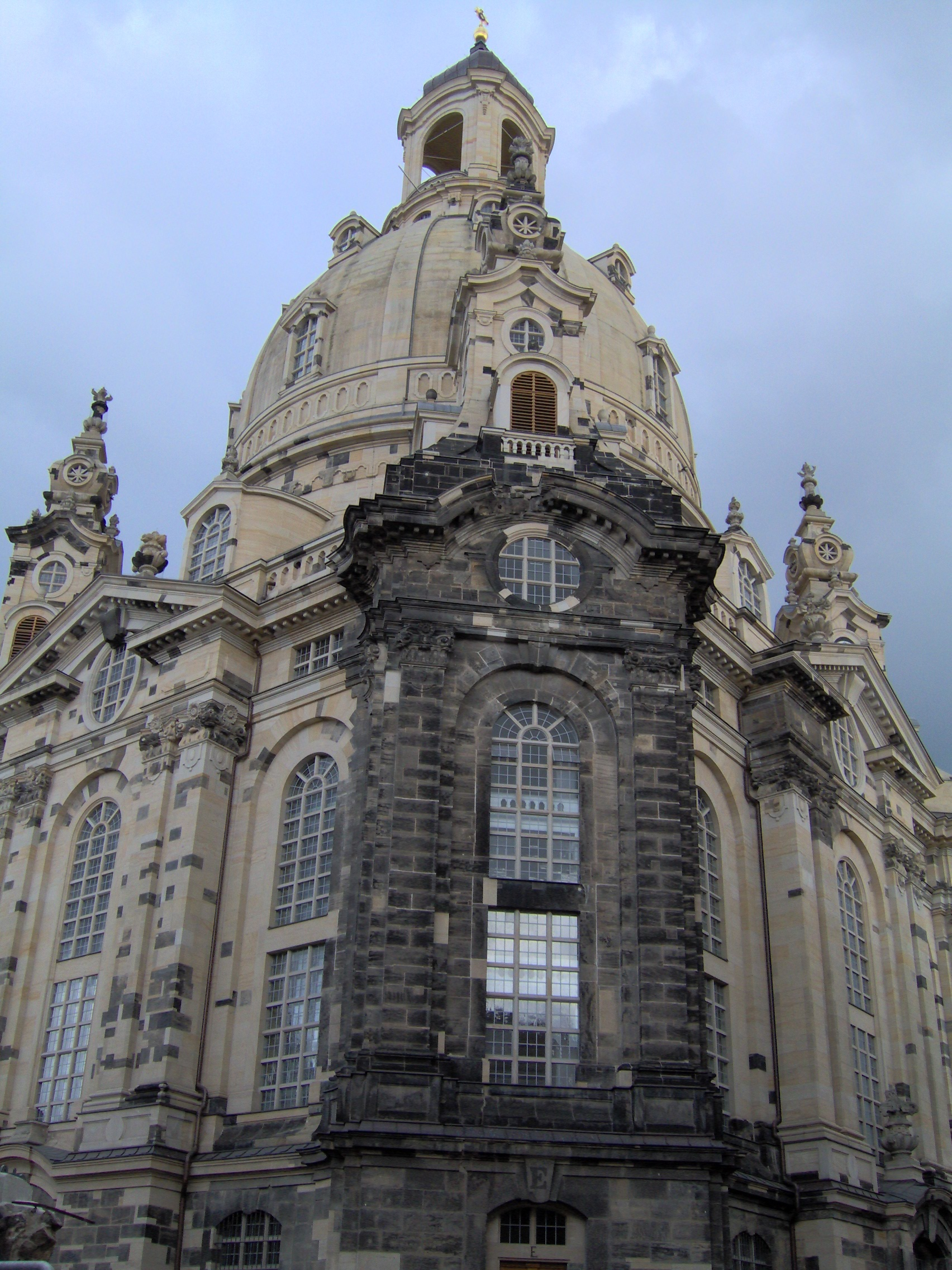
Dresdner Frauenkirche, 2006

As head of the society of the Dresdner Frauenkirche, Ludwig Güttler promoted the reconstruction of this famous Baroque church, which was destroyed during World War II and was rebuilt in 1994–2004. In recognition of these contributions, Queen Elizabeth II appointed him Officer of the Order of the British Empire (OBE) in November 2007.

== Biography ==
Güttler was born in 1943 in Sosa, in the Ore Mountain region of Saxony. He studied at the Staatliche Hochschule für Musik – Mendelssohn-Akademie in Leipzig with Armin Männel. From 1965 to 1969 he played in the orchestra of the Handel Festival in Halle and from 1969 to 1980 with the Dresden Philharmonic. He has been teaching the trumpet at the Hochschule für Musik Carl Maria von Weber in Dresden until 1990, and at the annual International Music Seminar in Weimar from 1980 to 1990.

Since the mid-1970s, Güttler has been mainly active as a soloist and later as a conductor, at home and abroad, devoted mainly to the trumpet literature of the 18th century, especially the high-pitched piccolo trumpet. He was also involved in the development of a modern brass instrument to play parts designated for the historic corno da caccia. The instrument was made by Friedbert Syhre in Leipzig.

Güttler is also musical director of the festival "Sandstein und Musik" (Sandstone and Music) in Saxon Switzerland, founded in 1983 and of the festival Musikwoche Hitzacker in Hitzacker. Güttler is a member of the Sächsische Akademie der Künste (Saxon Academy of Arts).

=== Virtuosi Saxoniae ===
Güttler founded the Leipziger Bach-Collegium in 1976, the Blechbläserensemble Ludwig Güttler in 1978, and in 1985 the chamber orchestra Virtuosi Saxoniae. The group of members of the Staatskapelle Dresden concentrates on performing music from the 18th century found in Dresden libraries, in the fields of opera, sacred music and chamber music.

=== Rheingau Musik Festival ===
He supported the Rheingau Musik Festival from the beginning in 1988, both as a performer and a curator. In 2011 he appeared with his Brass Ensemble. In 2012, he conducted his orchestra Virtuosi Saxoniae in Eberbach Abbey in works by Bach, Handel, Johann Friedrich Fasch, Christoph Förster, Telemann and Mozart, as part of the series "Companions along the way".

== Awards ==
In 1983 he received a record prize of the Deutsche Phono-Akademie in Hamburg as "Discovery of the Year". In 1988 he was the second recipient of the Georg-Philipp-Telemann-Preis of Magdeburg, in 1989 the Frankfurter Musikpreis. In both 1978 and 1985 he received the National Prize of East Germany, which he returned in 1989, asking that the money should be devoted to the reconstruction of the Frauenkirche.

== Frauenkirche ==
After the German reunification, Ludwig Güttler became chairman of the society for promoting the reconstruction of the Frauenkirche Dresden and curator of the foundation Stiftung Frauenkirche. He regularly conducted "Wiederaufbaukonzerte" (concerts for the reconstruction). For his involvement in the reconstruction of the Frauenkirche, he received several honours. President Horst Köhler awarded him in September 2007 the Great Cross of Merit of the Federal Republic of Germany. Erich Iltgen awarded him the Sächsische Verfassungsmedaille on 26 May 2005. Queen Elizabeth II appointed him Officer of the Order of the British Empire (OBE) in November 2007 in recognition of his contributions to the reconstruction of the Frauenkirche and his significant contribution to the reconciliation of the two peoples by this project.
