= Peter Schneider (conductor) =

Austrian conductor and opera administrator

Peter Schneider (born 26 March 1939, in Vienna) is an Austrian conductor and opera administrator.

Schneider served as kapellmeister of the Deutsche Oper am Rhein, Düsseldorf-Duisburg from 1961 to 1968; general music director of the Bremer Philharmoniker from 1978 to 1985; opera director and general music director of Nationaltheater Mannheim from 1985 to 1987; and general music director of the Bayerische Staatsoper orchestra, München from 1993 to 1998.

Schneider sang as a member of the Vienna Boys Choir as a youth, and was named honorary conductor of the Vienna State Opera in 2004.

== Decorations and awards ==
- Austrian Cross of Honour for Science and Art, 1st class (1997)
- Bavarian Order of Merit
- Honorary member of the Vienna State Opera
- Winners of the Foundation Semperoper Dresden (2008)
- Grand Decoration of Honour for Services to the Republic of Austria (2009)
