= Don Carlos discography =

Recordings of the opera by Verdi

This is a list of audio and video recordings (discography) of Don Carlos, an opera by Giuseppe Verdi, known as Don Carlo in its Italian-language versions. Don Carlos premiered as a five-act French grand opera at the Théâtre Impérial de l'Opéra in Paris on 11 March 1867. In 1883, Verdi created a revised 4-act version in French, which was first performed in Milan in Italian translation and has since generally been performed and recorded in Italian. In 1886, Ricordi published a 5-act (Modena) version without the ballet with the first act added to the 4-act 1883 revision. The 1886 Modena version has been recorded in French and in Italian. Since 1973, some performances in Italian and in French have restored music cut before the Paris premiere, especially the introduction to Act 1 (with a chorus of woodcutters). When all the music known to have been cut before the 1867 premiere is included, and the ballet (written in 1867) is omitted, it is sometimes referred to as the "1866 version".

== Audio recordings in French ==
Year	Cast (Don Carlos, Elisabeth, Eboli, Rodrigue, King Philip II, Grand Inquisitor Un voix d'en haut)	Conductor, Opera house and orchestra	Label
1973	André Turp, Edith Tremblay, Michelle Vilma, Robert Savoie, Joseph Rouleau, Richard Van Allan, Prudence Lloyd	John Matheson, BBC Concert Orchestra, BBC Singers (original BBC broadcast; 5-act Paris version with the ballet and all the music cut before the premiere)	Opera Rara; Cat: ORCV 305
1984	Plácido Domingo, Katia Ricciarelli, Lucia Valentini Terrani, Leo Nucci, Ruggero Raimondi, Nicolai Ghiaurov, Arleen Auger	Claudio Abbado, Teatro alla Scala Orchestra and Chorus (1886 5-act version with five pieces of cut or replaced music and the ballet in an appendix)	Deutsche Grammophon; Cat: 415 981-2
1996	Roberto Alagna, Karita Mattila, Waltraud Meier, Thomas Hampson, José van Dam, Eric Halfvarson, Donna Brown	Antonio Pappano, Orchestre de Paris, Théâtre du Châtelet Chorus (recorded at Théâtre du Châtelet; 5-act version without ballet with some of the music cut before the premiere and some from the 1886 revised version)	EMI Classics; Cat: 56152

== Video recordings in French ==
Year	Cast (Don Carlos, Elisabeth, Eboli, Rodrigue, King Philip II, Grand Inquisitor, Une voix d'en haut)	Conductor, Opera house and orchestra	Label
1996	Roberto Alagna, Karita Mattila, Waltraud Meier, Thomas Hampson, José van Dam, Eric Halfvarson, Donna Brown	Antonio Pappano, Orchestre de Paris, Théâtre du Châtelet Chorus (Stage producer: Luc Bondy; 5-act version without ballet with some of the music cut before the premiere and some from the 1886 revised version)	DVD, Blu-ray: Kultur Video; Cat: D 2031
2004	Ramon Vargas, Iano Tamar, Nadja Michael, Bo Skovhus, Alastair Miles, Simon Yang, Inna Los	Bertrand de Billy, Wiener Staatsoper (Directed for stage by Peter Konwitschny; 5-act Paris version with the ballet and all the music cut before the premiere)	DVD: TDK
2017	Jonas Kaufmann, Sonya Yoncheva, Elīna Garanča, Ludovic Tézier, Ildar Abdrazakov, Krysztof Baczyk, Silga Tiruma	Philippe Jordan, Paris Opera Orchestra & Chorus (Production by Krzysztof Warlikowski; recorded live, 19 October 2017, Opéra Bastille; 5-act 1866 Paris version, with most of the music cut before the premiere but without the ballet)	HD video: Arte/Paris Opera/Telemondis
2022	Matthew Polenzani, Sonya Yoncheva, Jamie Barton, Étienne Dupuis, Eric Owens, John Relyea, Amanda Woodbury	Patrick Furrer, Metropolitan Opera (Production by David McVicar; 5-act 1886 revised version with the 1866 Paris Don Carlos/Philip duet and insurrection in scene 2 of act 4 and largo ending of act 5)	Streaming HD video: Met Opera on Demand

== Audio recordings in Italian ==
Year	Cast (Don Carlos, Elisabeth, Eboli, Rodrigue, King Philip II, Grand Inquisitor Voce dal Cielo)	Conductor, Opera house and orchestra	Label
1950	Jussi Björling; Delia Rigal; Fedora Barbieri; Robert Merrill; Cesare Siepi; Jerome Hines; Lucine Amara	Fritz Stiedry; Metropolitan Opera orchestra and chorus (4 acts; radio broadcast recorded 11 November)	West Hill Radio Archives; Cat: WHRA 6021 and Met Opera on Demand
1951	Mirto Picchi; Maria Caniglia; Ebe Stignani; Paolo Silveri; Nicola Rossi-Lemeni; Giulio Neri; Graziella Sciutti	Fernando Previtali; Orchestra Sinfonica e Coro di Roma della RAI (4 acts)	Warner Fonit; Cat: 8573 82649-2
1954	Mario Filippeschi; Antonietta Stella; Elena Nicolai; Tito Gobbi; Boris Christoff; Giulio Neri; Orietta Moscucci	Gabriele Santini; Teatro dell'Opera di Roma orchestra Rome Opera Chorus (4 acts)	EMI Classics; Cat: 64642
1955	Richard Tucker; Eleanor Steber; Blanche Thebom; Ettore Bastianini; Jerome Hines; Nicola Moscona; Shakeh Vartenissian	Kurt Adler; Metropolitan Opera orchestra and chorus (4 acts; recorded on 5 March)	Myto; Cat: 946.116
1956	Angelo Lo Forese; Anita Cerquetti; Fedora Barbieri; Ettore Bastianini; Cesare Siepi; Giulio Neri; Shakeh Vartenissian	Antonino Votto; Coro e Orchestra del Maggio Musicale Fiorentino (recorded on 16 June)	Melodram; Cat: CDM 370104.
1958	Eugenio Fernandi; Sena Jurinac; Giulietta Simionato; Ettore Bastianini; Cesare Siepi; Marco Stefanoni; Anneliese Rothenberger	Herbert von Karajan; Vienna State Opera orchestra and chorus (4 acts; recorded at Salzburg Festival on 26 July)	Deutsche Grammophon; Cat: 447655
1958	Jon Vickers; Gré Brouwenstijn; Fedora Barbieri; Tito Gobbi; Boris Christoff; Michael Langdon; Ava June	Carlo Maria Giulini; Royal Opera House orchestra and chorus (1886 5-act "Modena version"; recorded on 12 May)	Royal Opera House Heritage; Cat: ROHS 003
1961	Flaviano Labò; Antonietta Stella; Fiorenza Cossotto; Ettore Bastianini; Boris Christoff; Ivo Vinco; Giuliana Matteini	Gabriele Santini; Teatro alla Scala orchestra and chorus (5 acts; 1886 unabridged version)	Deutsche Grammophon; Cat: 437739
1964	Franco Corelli; Leonie Rysanek; Irene Dalis; Nicolae Herlea; Giorgio Tozzi; Hermann Uhde; Junetta Jones	Kurt Adler; Metropolitan Opera orchestra and chorus (4 acts; recorded on 7 March)	Living Stage; Cat: LS 4035171 and Met Opera on Demand
1965	Carlo Bergonzi; Renata Tebaldi; Grace Bumbry; Dietrich Fischer-Dieskau; Nicolai Ghiaurov; Martti Talvela; Joan Carlyle	Georg Solti; Royal Opera House orchestra and chorus (5 acts; 1886 unabridged version)	Decca; Cat: 421114
1970	Plácido Domingo; Montserrat Caballé; Shirley Verrett; Sherrill Milnes; Ruggero Raimondi; Giovanni Foiani; María-Rosa del Campo	Carlo Maria Giulini; Royal Opera House orchestra and chorus (5 acts; 1886 unabridged version)	EMI Classics; Cat: 67397
1978	José Carreras; Mirella Freni; Agnes Baltsa; Piero Cappuccilli; Nicolai Ghiaurov; Ruggero Raimondi; Barbara Hendricks	Herbert von Karajan; Berlin Philharmonic; Deutsche Oper Berlin chorus (4 acts)	EMI Classics; Cat: 6930
1992	Luciano Pavarotti; Daniela Dessì; Luciana d'Intino; Paolo Coni; Samuel Ramey; Alexander Anisimov; Nuccia Focile	Riccardo Muti; Teatro alla Scala orchestra and chorus (4 acts)	EMI Classics; Cat: 58631
1997	Richard Margison; Galina Gorchakova; Olga Borodina; Dmitri Hvorostovsky; Roberto Scandiuzzi; Robert Lloyd; Sylvia McNair	Bernard Haitink; Royal Opera House orchestra and chorus (5 acts; 1886 unabridged version)	Philips; Cat:

== Video recordings in Italian ==
Year	Cast (Don Carlos, Elisabeth, Eboli, Rodrigue, King Philip II, Grand Inquisitor Una voce dal cielo)	Conductor, Opera house and orchestra	Label
1980	Vasile Moldoveanu; Renata Scotto; Tatiana Troyanos; Sherrill Milnes; Paul Plishka; Jerome Hines; Therese Brandson	James Levine; Metropolitan Opera orchestra and chorus Production by John Dexter (Unabridged 5-act version; telecast on 21 February)	DVD: The Metropolitan Opera; Cat: 811357013311; and Met Opera on Demand
1983	Plácido Domingo, Mirella Freni; Grace Bumbry; Louis Quilico; Nicolai Ghiaurov; Ferruccio Furlanetto; Marvis Martin	James Levine; Metropolitan Opera orchestra and chorus Production by John Dexter (Unabridged 5-act version; telecast on 26 March)	DVD: Deutsche Grammophon; Cat: 00440 073 4085; Streaming video: Met Opera on Demand
1985	Luis Lima, Ileana Cotrubas; Bruna Baglioni; Giorgio Zancanaro; Robert Lloyd; Joseph Rouleau; Lola Biagioni	Bernard Haitink; The Royal Opera, Covent Garden; Original production by Luchino Visconti; Staged by Christopher Renshaw (5-act 1886 version)	DVD: Warner Vision; Cat: 505 1011 02422-1 (2005)
1986	José Carreras; Fiamma Izzo D'Amico; Agnes Baltsa; Piero Cappuccilli; Ferruccio Furlanetto; Matti Salminen; Antonella Bandelli	Herbert von Karajan; Berlin Philharmonic; Salzburg Festival chorus Set design: Günther Schneider-Siemssen (4 acts)	DVD: Sony Classical; Cat: 88697296019
1992	Luciano Pavarotti; Daniela Dessì; Luciana D'Intino; Paolo Coni; Samuel Ramey; Alexander Anisimov; Antonella Bandelli	Riccardo Muti; Teatro alla Scala orchestra and chorus Stage production and video direction: Franco Zeffirelli (4 acts)	DVD: EMI Classics; Cat: 358631-2
2008	Rolando Villazón; Marina Poplavskaya; Sonia Ganassi; Simon Keenlyside; Ferruccio Furlanetto; Eric Halfvarson; Anita Watson	Antonio Pappano; Royal Opera House orchestra and chorus Directed by Nicolas Hytner (1886 version in 5 acts; recorded on 14, 17 June and 3 July)	DVD: EMI Classics; Cat: 50999 6 31609 9 4
2010	Roberto Alagna; Marina Poplavskaya; Anna Smirnova; Simon Keenlyside; Ferruccio Furlanetto; Eric Halfvarson; Jennifer Check	Yannick Nézet-Séguin; Metropolitan Opera; Production by Nicolas Hytner (1886 version in 5 acts; recorded on 11 December)	HD streaming video: Met Opera on Demand
2013	Jonas Kaufmann; Anja Harteros; Ekaterina Semenchuk; Thomas Hampson; Matti Salminen; Eric Halfvarson; Kiandra Howarth	Antonio Pappano; Vienna Philharmonic; Salzburg Festival chorus Staged by Peter Stein (5-act hybrid of the 1886 Modena and 1866 uncut Paris versions)	DVD: Sony Classical; Cat: 88843005769; Blu-ray: Cat: 88843005779
2024	Joshua Guerrero; Asmik Grigorian; Eve-Maud Hubeaux; Étienne Dupuis; Roberto Tagliavini; Dimitry Ulyanov; Ileana Tonca	Philippe Jordan; Vienna State Opera Orchestra & Chorus; Stage director, set & costume designer: Kirill Serebrennikov (4 acts, abridged; recorded on 29 September)	4K UHD streaming video: Unitel

== Recordings in German ==
Year	Cast (Don Carlos, Elisabeth, Eboli, Rodrigue, King Philip II, Grand Inquisitor Voce dal Cielo)	Conductor, Opera house and orchestra	Label
1948	Boris Greverus; Irma Demuth; Joanna Blatter; Dietrich Fischer-Dieskau; Josef Greindl; Josef Herrmann; Elfriede Hingst	Ferenc Fricsay, Berlin State Opera orchestra and chorus (5 acts, abridged, sung in German; recorded on 18 November)	Audio recording: Myto; Cat: 001.H038
1960	Martin Ritzman; Ludmila Dvořáková; Hedwig Müller-Bütow; Rudolf Jedlicka; Theo Adam; Gerhard Frei; Jutta Vulpius	Franz Konwitschny, Berlin Opera House, Staatskapelle Berlin (4 acts, sung in German)	Walhall Eternity Series
1965	James King; Pilar Lorengar; Patricia Johnson; Dietrich Fischer-Dieskau; Josef Greindl; Martti Talvela	Wolfgang Sawallisch, Deutsche Oper Berlin orchestra and chorus (4 acts; sung in German)	DVD: Arthaus Musik; Cat: 101 621
