= Jonas Kaufmann =

German opera singer (born 1969)

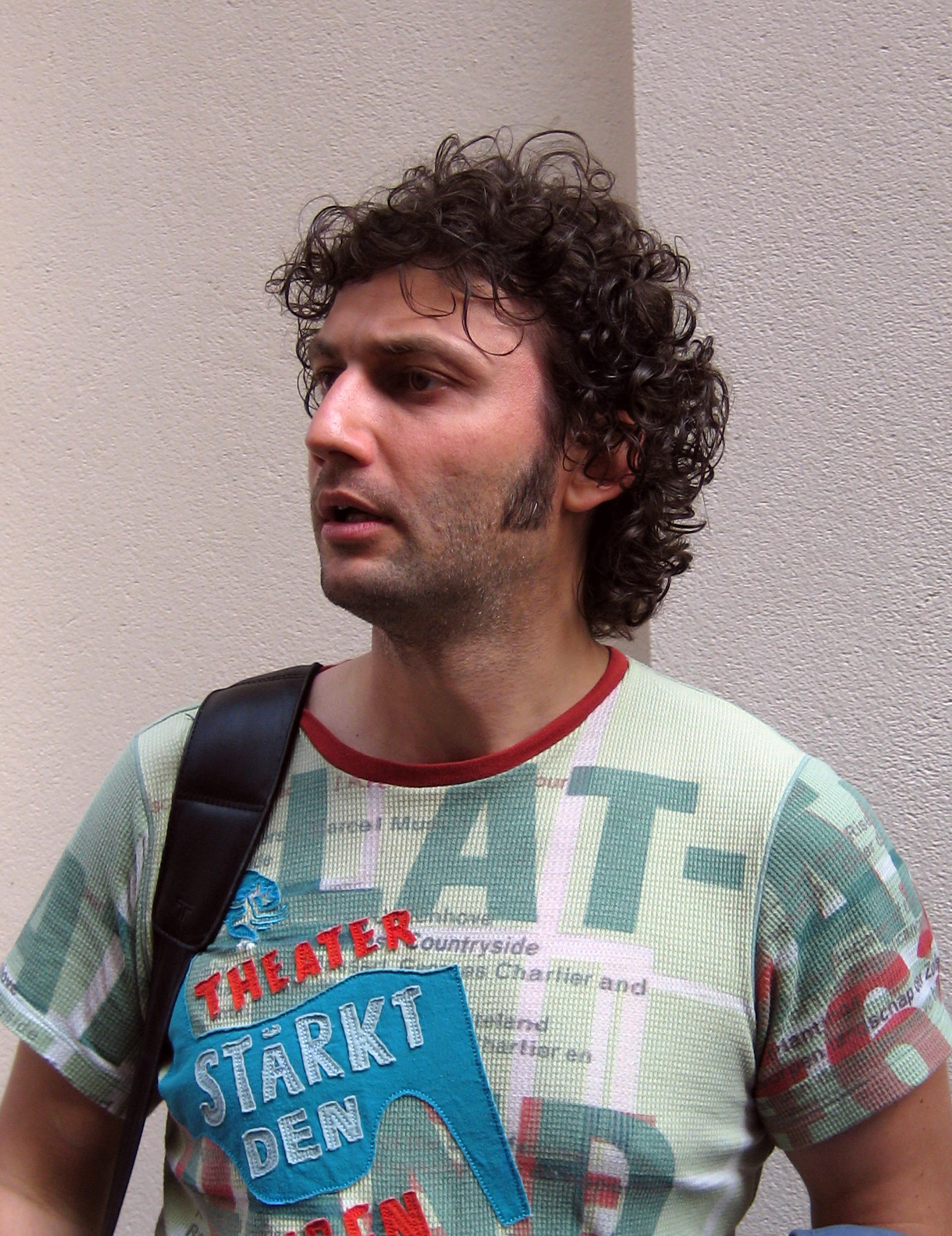
- Kaufmann in 2008
- Born: 10 July 1969 (age 57); Munich, West Germany
- Occupation: Operatic tenor
- Years active: 1994–present
- Children: 4
- Website: jonaskaufmann.com

Jonas Kaufmann (born 10 July 1969) is a German and Austrian operatic tenor. He is best known for the versatility of his repertoire, performing a variety of opera roles in multiple languages in recital and concert each season. Some of his standout roles include Don José in Carmen, Cavaradossi in Tosca, Maurizio in Adriana Lecouvreur, Don Alvaro in La forza del destino, Siegmund in Die Walküre, and the title roles in Parsifal, Werther, Don Carlos, and Lohengrin. In 2014 The New York Times described Kaufmann as "a box-office draw, and... the most important, versatile tenor of his generation."

== Early life and education ==
Kaufmann was born in Munich on 10 July 1969. His father worked for an insurance company, and his mother was a kindergarten teacher. He had one older sister. He started studying piano when he was eight, and he sang in his elementary school choir. Although he studied for mathematics entrance exams, in the summer of 1989 he began his vocal training at the University of Music and Performing Arts Munich. While he was studying, he sang some small roles at the Bavarian State Opera. He graduated from university in 1994, achieving distinctions in both opera and concert performances.

In 1995, Kaufmann received help from American baritone Michael Rhodes, who taught him a "new way of singing" and how to become "more relaxed in my voice and in myself." In Kaufmann's book Meinen die wirklich mich? he said, "To find a Michael Rhodes that can really help you and bring you to success is really a great stroke of luck."

== Career ==
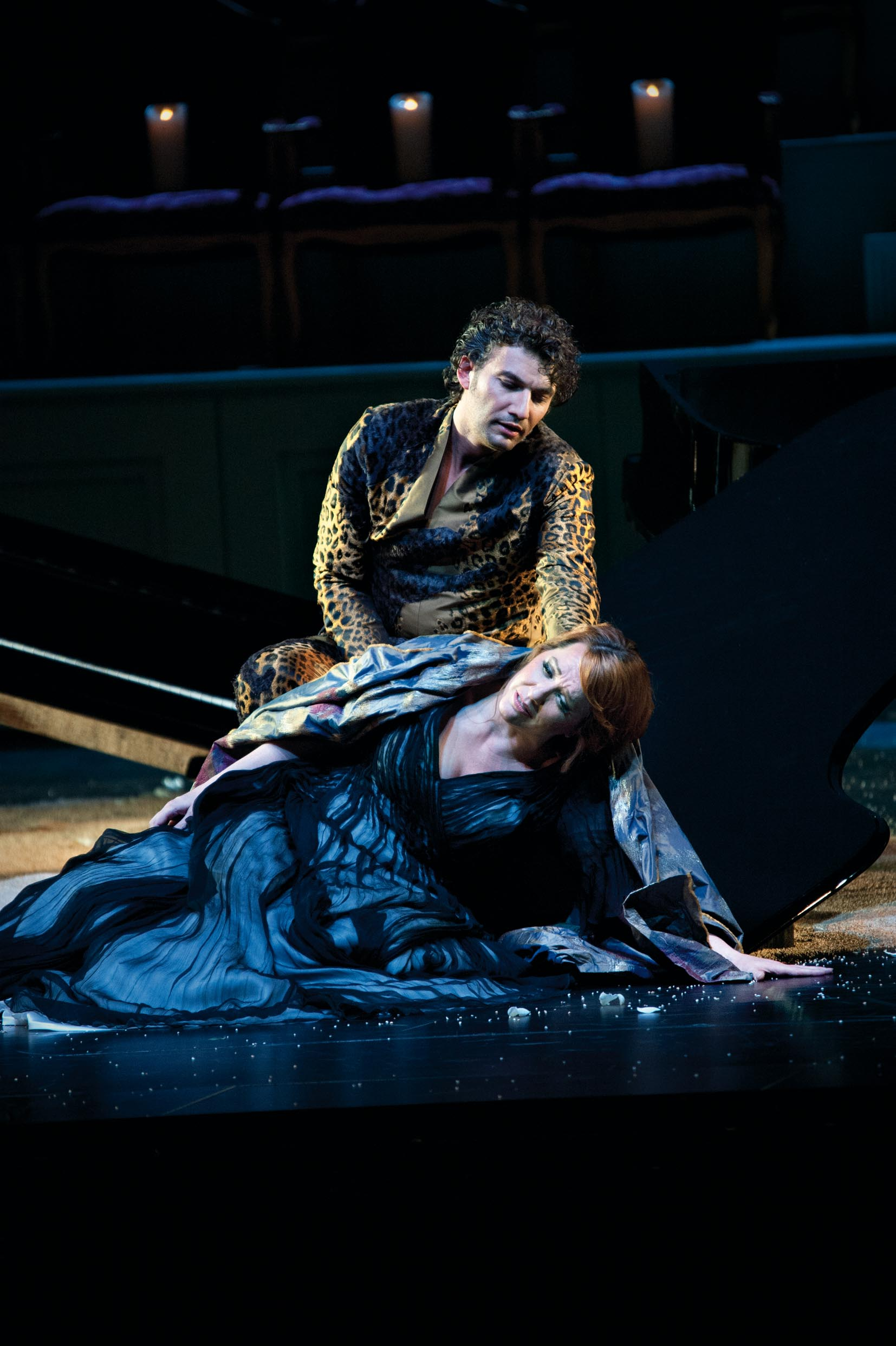
Emily Magee as Ariadne and Kaufmann as Bacchus in Ariadne auf Naxos by Richard Strauss, at the Salzburg Festival of 2012

He began his professional career at the Staatstheater Saarbrücken in 1994 and was soon invited to make debuts in German theaters such as the Stuttgart Opera and Hamburg State Opera, as well as international debuts at the Lyric Opera of Chicago, Opéra National de Paris, and La Scala. He made his Salzburg Festival debut in 1999 in a new production of Busoni's Doktor Faust and returned there in 2003 as Belmonte in Mozart's Die Entführung aus dem Serail and for concerts of Beethoven's Ninth Symphony with the Berlin Philharmonic.

He performed the role of Don José in Bizet's Carmen, to critical acclaim, at the Royal Opera House, Covent Garden, in 2006/7. He made his debut as Alfredo in Verdi's La traviata at the Metropolitan Opera alongside Angela Gheorghiu in 2006, also to critical acclaim, and also sang the role at the Met in 2007 and 2008, and at the Royal Opera House in 2008. In May 2008, he played Cavaradossi in Puccini's Tosca at Covent Garden, yet again to critical acclaim.

In 2008/9, he performed in Massenet's Manon in Chicago opposite Natalie Dessay and in the title role of a new production of Wagner's Lohengrin at the Bavarian State Opera. He also sang Lohengrin on the opening night of the Bayreuth Festival in 2010, in a production staged by Hans Neuenfels and conducted by Andris Nelsons.

His debut recording with Decca, Romantic Arias, was released in January 2008. He has also recorded a Schubert song cycle on the same label and the role of Pinkerton in Puccini's Madama Butterfly for EMI.

In January 2010, he took the title role in Massenet's Werther at the Opéra Bastille in Paris. The performance was recorded and released on DVD in November 2010.

In April 2011, he returned to the Metropolitan Opera as Siegmund in Robert Lepage's new production of Wagner's Die Walküre. In September 2011, he underwent surgery to remove a lymph node from his chest. In December, he was back, performing the title role in Gounod's Faust.

On 15 February 2013, Kaufmann made his first appearance in the title role of Wagner's Parsifal at the Metropolitan Opera. His performance received rave reviews from critics. In July of that year he was named a Kammersänger of the Bavarian State Opera by the Bavarian Ministry of Arts. In December he sang the role of Don Alvaro in Verdi's La forza del destino with the company.

In February 2014, Kaufmann sang the title role in Massenet's Werther at the Met. He followed this by touring with Schubert's song cycle Winterreise with Helmut Deutsch. In June 2014, he made his debut in the role of Des Grieux in Puccini's Manon Lescaut at the Royal Opera House in London. That November he sang the same role in another production of Manon Lescaut at the Bavarian State Opera.

On 12 September 2015, Kaufmann became the first German singer to perform the British patriotic song "Rule, Britannia!" at the Last Night of The Proms.

On 23 February 2016, the documentary Jonas Kaufmann: An Evening with Puccini was released in selected theaters in the United States. The film centered around Kaufmann's 2015 performance at La Scala in Milan and featured rare archive footage.

In 2018, Kaufmann made his debut as Tristan in concert performances of the second act of Wagner's Tristan und Isolde.

In 2019, the concert stage saw Kaufmann tour Germany with Mahler's "Lied von der Erde", and performances from his "L'Opéra" CD. Operatic highlights include Fidelio and Otello at the Bayerische Staatsoper; La Forza del destino at the Royal Opera House in London; Andrea Chenier in Sydney and Melbourne and a new production of Die Tote Stadt in Munich.

Highlights from 2020 included a tour of Kaufmann's album "Mein Wien", Aida at the Teatro San Carlo in Napoli; Don Carlos at the Wiener Staatsoper; La Bohème at the Bayerische Staatsoper; and Cavalleria Rusticana at the Teatro San Carlo in Napoli.

In 2021, Kaufmann gave recitals in Madrid and Vienna; sung in new productions of Aida in Paris and Parsifal in Vienna; and had his full role debut as Tristan at the Bayerische Staatsoper. Kaufmann also embarked on a tour of North America, accompanied by pianist Helmut Deutsch.

Kaufmann commenced the year 2022 with a role debut as the titular role in Britten's Peter Grimes at the Wiener Staatsoper. In March 2022, a studio recording of Turandot was organized by Antonio Pappano at the Santa Cecilia auditorium. Jonas Kaufmann sang the role of Calaf for the first time there alongside Sondra Radvanovsky in the title role. A public concert was performed on 12 March 2022 in Rome. After Turandot Kaufmann undertakes a tour of eleven concerts of Lieder by Brahms and Schumann with Diana Damrau and her usual pianist Helmut Deutsch, in various European cities, including Berlin, Munich, Paris, London. He made his role debut as Calaf (Turandot) in Rome with the Accademia Nazionale di Santa Cecilia orchestra, conducted by Pappano, performed Mario Cavaradossi (Tosca) at Teatro San Carlo in Naples, the title role in Lohengrin at Melbourne Opera, and made his operatic debut at the Arena di Verona, performing Radames in Aida.

To begin the 2022/23 season, Kaufmann returned to the Bayerische Staatsoper to perform the title role in Britten's Peter Grimes. To commence the New Year, he performed the role of Radames in Verdi's Aida at the Wiener Staatsoper alongside Anna Netrebko and Elīna Garanča. At the Wiener Staatsoper he also performed the title role in Andrea Chenier, which he later performed at La Scala. He made his role debut as the title-role in Tannhäuser at the Salzburger Osterfestspiele, and also performed the title role in Werther at the Royal Opera House. On the concert stage, he performed several recitals in Europe and in South America.

Highlights of Kaufmann's 2023/24 season include the world premiere of Doppelgänger in New York's Park Avenue Armory with Helmut Deutsch, directed by Claus Guth, and Calaf in Puccini's Turandot alongside Asmik Grigorian in the title role at the Wiener Staatsoper.

== Personal life ==
Kaufmann has been married twice. His first marriage to mezzo-soprano Margarete Joswig produced three children, and ended in divorce. His second marriage is to the opera director Christiane Lutz. The couple married in late 2018, and have a child, born in March 2019.

Kaufmann has German and Austrian dual citizenship, with Austrian citizenship awarded to him in February 2021. His current main residence is in Salzburg.

== Discography ==
=== Audio ===
Year	Album	Credits	Peak positions						
Year	Album	Credits	GER	AUT	BEL	FRA	SPN	SWI	UK
2001	Der Vampyr	Jonas Kaufmann / Franz Hawlata / Regina Klepper / Anke Hoffmann / Markus Marquardt / Thomas Dewald / Yoo-Chang Nah / WDR Rundfunkchor Köln, WDR Rundfunkorchester Köln & Helmuth Froschauer	–	–	–	–	–	–	–
2006	Strauss Lieder	Jonas Kaufmann / Piano Helmut Deutsch	–	–	–	–	–	–	–
2008	Romantic Arias	Jonas Kaufmann / Prague Philharmonic Orchestra / Marco Armiliato	31	–	–	148	–	–	–
2008	Puccini: Madama Butterfly	Angela Gheorghiu / Jonas Kaufmann / Enkeleida Shkosa / Fabio Capitanucci / Orchestra e Coro dell' Accademia Nazionale di Santa Cecilia Roma / Antonio Pappano	–	–	–	–	–	–	–
2009	Sehnsucht	Jonas Kaufmann / Mahler Chamber Orchestra / Claudio Abbado	48	–	–	119	–	–	–
2010	Schubert – Die schöne Müllerin	Jonas Kaufmann	–	–	–	133	–	–	–
2010	Verismo Arias	Jonas Kaufmann	51	–	–	68	–	–	–
2011	Die Superstars der Klassik – Singen die schönsten Opernarien	Erwin Schrott / Anna Netrebko / Jonas Kaufmann	34	1	–	–	–	–	–
2012	Königskinder – Engelbert Humperdinck	Jonas Kaufmann / Isabel Rey	–	–	–	–	–	–	–
2013	Wagner	Kaufmann / Runnicles / Orchester der Deutschen Oper Berlin	43	30	99	76	–	–	–
2013	Verdi Requiem	Anja Harteros / Elīna Garanča / Jonas Kaufmann / René Pape / Orchestra e Coro del Teatro alla Scala / Daniel Barenboim	37	51	–	–	–	–	–
2013	Best of	Jonas Kaufmann	–	–	148	–	–	–	–
2013	Jonas Kaufmann	Jonas Kaufmann	–	59	–	145	–	–	–
2013	The Verdi Album	Jonas Kaufmann	16	7	120	53	58	55	100
2014	Winterreise	Jonas Kaufmann, Helmut Deutsch	38	22	111	87	1	73	–
2014	Du bist die Welt für mich	Jonas Kaufmann, Julia Kleiter (soprano), Rundfunk-Sinfonieorchester Berlin, conductor: Jochen Rieder	11	9	–	84	–	55	–
2015	The Age of Puccini	Jonas Kaufmann	–	56	–	–	–	–	–
2015	Nessun Dorma – The Puccini Album	Jonas Kaufmann	10	8	161	23	–	26	22
2015	Aida	Jonas Kaufmann, Anja Harteros, Ekaterina Semenchuk, Ludovic Tézier, Erwin Schrott, Antonio Pappano & Orchestra dell'Accademia Nazionale di Santa Cecilia	55	74	–	–	–	–	–
2016	Dolce Vita	Jonas Kaufmann	7	7	42	38	37	26	–
2017	Mahler: Das Lied von der Erde	Jonas Kaufmann	26	43	136	122	78	88	–
2017	L'Opéra	Jonas Kaufmann	26	13	102	56	51	50	–
2018	Eine italienische Nacht – Live aus der Waldbühne Berlin	Jonas Kaufmann	29	36	–	–	88	–	–
2019	Wien	Jonas Kaufmann, Vienna Philharmonic and Ádám Fischer	10	2	131	130	76	34	2
2020	Verdi: Otello	Jonas Kaufmann, Orchestra dell'Accademia Nazionale di Santa Cecilia	30	24	–	–	–	34	–
2020	Selige Stunde	Jonas Kaufmann, Helmut Deutsch	28	9	–	–	–	61	–
2020	Sommernachtskonzert 2020	Jonas Kaufmann, Valery Gergiev, der Wiener Philharmoniker	–	13	–	–	–	–	–
2020	It's Christmas!	Jonas Kaufmann	6	2	95	–	–	19	–
2021	Liszt – Freudvoll und Leidvoll	Jonas Kaufmann, Helmut Deutsch							
	It's Christmas – Extended Edition	Jonas Kaufmann							
2022	The Tenor	Jonas Kaufmann, Helmut Deutsch							
2022	Insieme	Jonas Kaufmann, Ludovic Tézier, Accademia di Santa Cecilia, Antonio Pappano							
2023	Turandot	Jonas Kaufmann, Ermonela Jaho, Michele Pertusi, Michael Spyres, Sondra Radvanovsky, Accademia di Santa Cecilia, Antonio Pappano							
2023	The Sound of Movies	Jonas Kaufmann							
2024	Parsifal	Jonas Kaufmann, Elīna Garanča, Ludovic Tézier, Georg Zeppenfeld, Philippe Jordan							
2024	Puccini: Love Affairs	Anna Netrebko, Pretty Yende, Sonya Yoncheva, Maria Agresta, Malin Byström, Asmik Grigorian, Orchestra del Teatro Comunale di Bologna, Asher Fisch							
"–" denotes a recording that did not chart or was not released in that territory.

=== DVDs ===
- 2002: Monteverdi – Il ritorno d'Ulisse in patria (Jonas Kaufmann / Vesselina Kasarova / Dietrich Henschel / Isabel Rey)
- 2002: Paisiello – Nina (Jonas Kaufmann / Cecilia Bartoli / László Polgár)
- 2004: Beethoven – Fidelio (Jonas Kaufmann / Camilla Nylund / László Polgár / Alfred Muff / Elizabeth Magnuson / Christoph Strehl)
- 2005: Mozart – La clemenza di Tito (Jonas Kaufmann / Vesselina Kasarova / Eva Mei / Malin Hartelius)
- 2006: Bizet – Carmen (Jonas Kaufmann / Anna Caterina Antonacci / Ildebrando D'Arcangelo / Norah Amsellem)
- 2006: Schubert – Fierrabras (Jonas Kaufmann / Juliane Banse / Michael Volle / Christoph Strehl / László Polgár)
- 2008: Bizet – Carmen (Jonas Kaufmann / Vesselina Kasarova / Isabel Rey / Michele Pertusi)
- 2009: R. Strauss – Der Rosenkavalier (Renée Fleming / Sophie Koch / Diana Damrau / Franz Hawlata / Jonas Kaufmann)
- 2009: Wagner – Lohengrin (Jonas Kaufmann / Anja Harteros / Wolfgang Koch / Michaela Schuster / Christof Fischesser / Evgeny Nikitin)
- 2010: Massenet – Werther (Jonas Kaufmann / Sophie Koch / Michel Plasson)
- 2010: Humperdinck – Königskinder (Jonas Kaufmann / Isabel Rey / Oilver Widmer / Liliana Nikiteanu)
- 2010: Cilea – Adriana Lecouvreur (Jonas Kaufmann / Angela Gheorghiu / Olga Borodina / Alessandro Corbelli)
- 2011: Puccini – Tosca (Jonas Kaufmann / Emily Magee / Thomas Hampson)
- 2011: Wagner – Die Walküre (Jonas Kaufmann / Eva-Maria Westbroek / Deborah Voigt / Bryn Terfel)
- 2011: Gounod – Faust (Jonas Kaufmann / Marina Poplavskaya / René Pape)
- 2011: Wagner – Der Ring des Nibelungen (Jonas Kaufmann / Bryn Terfel / Deborah Voigt / Jay Hunter Morris / Eva-Maria Westbroek)
- 2012: R.Strauss – Ariadne auf Naxos (Jonas Kaufmann / Emily Magee / Elena Moșuc / Peter Matić / Cornelius Obonya)
- 2012: Puccini – Tosca (Angela Gheorghiu / Jonas Kaufmann / Bryn Terfel / Antonio Pappano)
- 2012: Verdi – Requiem (Jonas Kaufmann / Anja Harteros / Elīna Garanča / René Pape)
- 2013: Wagner – Parsifal (Jonas Kaufmann / René Pape / Peter Mattei / Katarina Dalayman / Evgeny Nikitin / Daniele Gatti / François Girard)
- 2013: Puccini – La fanciulla del West (Jonas Kaufmann / Nina Stemme / Tomasz Konieczny)
- 2013: Verdi – Don Carlo (Jonas Kaufmann / Anja Harteros / Matti Salminen / Thomas Hampson / Ekaterina Semenchuk)
- 2014: Puccini – Manon Lescaut (Jonas Kaufmann / Kristine Opolais)
- 2014: Verdi – La Forza del destino (Jonas Kaufmann / Anja Harteros)
- 2015: Mascagni – Cavalleria rusticana (Jonas Kaufmann / Liudmyla Monastyrska) & Leoncavallo – Pagliacci (Jonas Kaufmann / Maria Agresta)
- 2015: Giordano – Andrea Chenier (Jonas Kaufmann / Eva-Marie Westbroek)
- 2016: Opera Gala Baden Baden – Gala Summer (Jonas Kaufmann / Bryn Terfel)
- 2017: Verdi – Otello (Jonas Kaufmann / Maria Agresta / Claudio Sgura
- 2021: Korngold – Die Tote Stadt (Jonas Kaufmann/Marlis Petersen)
- 2024: Schumann and Brahms: Love Songs (Jonas Kaufmann/Diana Damrau/Helmut Deutsch)

== Repertoire ==
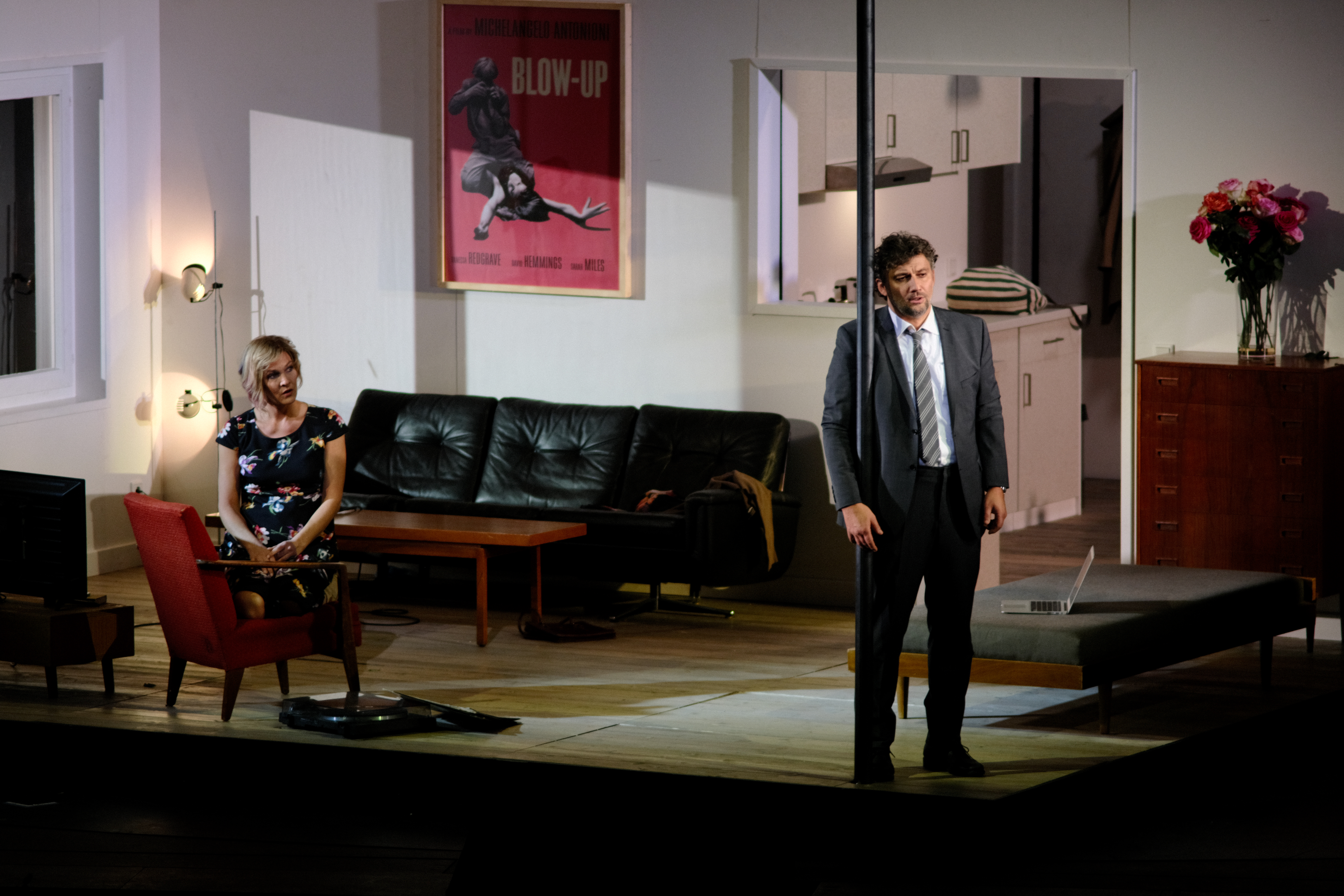
As Paul with Marlis Petersen as Marietta in Die tote Stadt, Bavarian State Opera 2019

Kaufmann's repertoire includes the following:

ITALIAN

Work	Role	Venue			
Work	Role	Venue	Bellini: Norma	Flavio	Solothurn (1996)
Cilea: Adriana Lecouvreur	Maurizio	Deutsche Oper Berlin (2010); London, London, Royal Opera House (2010); New York, Carnegie Hall (2011)			
Donizetti: L'elisir d'amore	Nemorino	Staatstheater Saarbrücken (1995)			
Giordano: Andrea Chenier	Andrea Chenier	London, London, Royal Opera House (2015); Bayerische Staatsoper München (2017); Théâtre des Champs-Élysées (2017); Barcelona, Gran Teatre del Liceu (2018); Wiener Staatsoper (2018); Sydney Opera House (2018); Arts Centre Melbourne Hamer Hall (2018)			
Mascagni/Leoncavallo: Cavalleria Rusticana/Pagliacci	Turiddu/Canio	Salzburg, Großes Festspielhaus (2015)			
Mascagni: Cavalleria rusticana	Turiddu	Napoli, Teatro San Carlo (2020)			
Monteverdi: L'incoronazione di Poppea	Nerone	Opernhaus Zürich (2005); London, Royal Festival Hall (2005)			
Monteverdi: Il ritorno d'Ulisse in patria	Telemaco	Opernhaus Zürich (2002)			
Mozart: La clemenza di Tito	Tito	Stadttheater Klagenfurt (1999); Madrid, Teatro Real (1999); Salzburger Festspiele (2003); Opernhaus Zürich (2005); London, Royal Festival Hall (2005)			
Mozart: Così fan tutte	Ferrando	Teatro Piccolo Milano (1998, 1999); Staatsoper Hamburg (2000); Wiesbaden, Maifestspiele (2000); Oper Frankfurt (2000); Tokyo (2000); Bayerische Staatsoper München (2001); Opernhaus Zürich (2005)			
Mozart: Don Giovanni	Don Ottavio	Staatstheater Saarbrücken (1995); Bad Lauchstädt, Goethetheater (1996)			
Mozart: Idomeneo	Idomeneo	Staatstheater Kassel (2001); Opernhaus Zürich (2003)			
Mozart: Lo sposo deluso K. 430, Symphony No. 9 D. 944	Pulchiero	Staatstheater Kassel (2001); Opernhaus Zürich (2003)			
Paer: Leonora	Florestano	Opernhaus Zürich (2000); Theater Winterthur (2000)			
Paisiello: Nina	Lindoro, Hirt	Opernhaus Zürich (2002)			
Puccini: La bohème	Rodolfo	Staatsoper Stuttgart (2004); Opernhaus Zürich (2007, 2011); Staatsoper Berlin (2008); Großes Festspielhaus (2012); Bayerische Staatsoper München (2020)			
Puccini: La fanciulla del West	Dick Johnson	Wiener Staatsoper (2013); New York, Metropolitan Opera (2018) Bayerische Staatsoper (2022)			
Puccini: Turandot	Calaf	Roma, Santa Cecilia, (2022)			
Puccini: Manon Lescaut	Des Grieux	London, Royal Opera House (2014); Bayerische Staatsoper München (2014, 2015)			
Puccini: La rondine	Ruggero	London, Royal Opera House (2004)			
Puccini: Tosca	Cavaradossi	London, Royal Opera House (2008, 2011); Opernhaus Zürich (2009); Wiener Staatsoper (2009, 2016, 2017); Deutsche Oper Berlin (2009); New York, Metropolitan Opera (2010); Bayerische Staatsoper München (2010, 2013, 2016); Milano, Teatro alla Scala (2011); Staatsoper Hamburg (2018) Teatro di San Carlo (2022)			
Rossini: Il barbiere di Siviglia	Almaviva	Staatsoper Stuttgart (1999, 2000, 2001)			
Verdi: Aida	Radames	Roma, Accademia Nazionale di Santa Cecilia (2015); Bayerische Staatsoper München (2015); Napoli, Teatro San Carlo / Piazza Plebiscito (2020); Paris, Opéra Bastille (2021), Wiener Staatsoper (2023), Arena di Verona (2022)			
Verdi: Don Carlo	Don Carlo	Opernhaus Zürich (2007); London, Royal Opera House (2009, 2013); Bayerische Staatsoper München (2012, 2013); Salzburger Festspiele (2013)			
Verdi: Falstaff	Fenton	Opernhaus Zürich (2005)			
Verdi: La forza del destino	Alvaro	Bayerische Staatsoper München (2013, 2014, 2015, 2017); London, Royal Opera House (2019)			
Verdi: I masnadieri	Carlo	Filderstadt, Herbstliche Musiktage (2005)			
Verdi: Rigoletto	Duca	Opernhaus Zürich (2005, 2007)			
Verdi: Otello	Cassio	Lyric Opera of Chicago (2001); Paris, Opéra Bastille (2004)			
Verdi: Otello	Otello	London, Royal Opera House (2017); Bayerische Staatsoper München (2018, 2019)			
Verdi: La traviata	Alfredo	Staatsoper Stuttgart (2000, 2005. 2006); Lyric Opera of Chicago (2003); New York, Metropolitan Opera (2006, 2007, 2008); Opernhaus Zürich (2007, 2009); Paris, Palais Garnier (2007); Milano, Teatro alla Scala (2007); London, Royal Opera House (2008); Bayerische Staatsoper München (2009)			
Verdi: La traviata	Gastone	Staatstheater Saarbrücken (1995); Solothurn (1996)			
Verdi: Il trovatore	Manrico	Bayerische Staatsoper München (2013)			

FRENCH

Work	Role	Venue			
Work	Role	Venue	Berlioz: La damnation de Faust	Faust	Dresden, Musikfest (2002); Bruxelles, La Monnaie (2002); Amsterdam, Concertgebouw (2002); Genève, Grand Théâtre (2003); Berlin, Philharmonie (2003); Zürich, Tonhalle (2003); Bochum, Jahrhunderthalle (2004); Roma, Accademia di Santa Cecilia (2006); Wiener Staatsoper (2012); Paris, Opéra Bastille (2015)
Bizet: Carmen	Don José	London, Royal Opera House (2007); Opernhaus Zürich (2008); Milano, Teatro alla Scala (2009); New York, Metropolitan Opera (2010); Bayerische Staatsoper München (2010, 2011); Salzburger Festspiele (2012); Berlin, Philharmonie (2012); Chorégies d'Orange (2015); Staatsoper Hamburg (2019)			
Bizet: Carmen	Remandado	Staatstheater Saarbrücken (1994, 1996); Solothurn (1996)			
Gounod: Faust	Faust	Opernhaus Zürich (2005); New York, Metropolitan Opera (2011)			
Massenet: Manon	Des Grieux	Lyric Opera of Chicago (2008); Wiener Staatsoper (2009); London, Royal Opera House (2014)			
Massenet: Werther	Werther	Paris, Opéra Bastille (2010); Wiener Staatsoper (2011); Mannheim, Nationaltheater (2013); New York, Metropolitan Opera (2014)			
Thomas: Mignon	Wilhelm	Toulouse, Capitole (2001)			
Verdi: Don Carlos	Don Carlos	Paris, Opéra Bastille (2017); Wiener Staatsoper (2020)			

GERMAN

Work	Role	Venue			
Work	Role	Venue	Beethoven: Fidelio	Florestan	Rheingau Musikfestival (2002); Stuttgart, Liederhalle (2002); Bonn, Beethovenhalle (2002); Opernhaus Zürich (2007, 2008); Paris, Opéra Garnier (2008); Luzern, Festival (2010); Bayerische Staatsoper München (2010, 2011, 2019); Les Arts de Valencia (2011); Paris, Théâtre des Champs-Élysées (2012); Milano, Teatro alla Scala (2014); Salzburger Festspiele (2015); London, Royal Opera House (2020) Grafenegg Festival (2022) Gastaad Festival (2022)
Beethoven: Fidelio	Jaquino	Staatsoper Stuttgart (1998, 1999); Milano, Teatro alla Scala (1999)			
Berg: Wozzeck	Andres	Staatstheater Saarbrücken (1994, 1996)			
Busoni: Doktor Faust	Student	Salzburger Festspiele (1999)			
Humperdinck: Die Königskinder	Königssohn	Montpellier Corum (2005); Opernhaus Zürich (2007, 2010)			
Korngold: Die tote Stadt	Paul	Bayerische Staatsoper München (2019)			
Loewe: Drei Wünsche	Hassan	Bad Urach (1996); Pfalztheater Kaiserlautern (1996)			
Offenbach: Die beiden Blinden		Staatstheater Saarbrücken (1996)			
Mozart: Die Entführung auf dem Serail	Belmonte	Bruxelles, La Monnaie (1999); Opernhaus Zürich (2002); Salzburg, Kleines Festspielhaus (2003)			
Mozart: Die Zauberflöte	Tamino	München, Prinzregententheater (1994); Stadttheater Würzburg (1997); Opernhaus Zürich (2000, 2002, 2003, 2005); Salzburger Landestheater (2000); Berlin, Komische Oper (2002, 2003); Bayerische Staatsoper München (2005); Wiener Staatsoper (2006); New York, Metropolitan Opera (2006); Opernhaus Zürich (2007); Staatstheater Wiesbaden (2007)			
Schönberg: Moses und Aron	Jüngling	Staatstheater Saarbrücken (1996)			
Schubert: Fierrabras	Fierrabras	Opernhaus Zürich (2002, 2005, 2006); Wiener Konzerthaus (2005); Paris, Théâtre du Chatelet (2006)			
Schubert: Des Teufels Lustschloß	Oswald	Jagdschloß Kranichstein (1997)			
Schubring: Cyrano de Bergerac	Christian de Neuvillette	Staatstheater Saarbrücken (1995)			
Strauss II: Eine Nacht in Venedig	Caramello	Regensburg (1993, 1994)			
Strauss II: Die Fledermaus	Alfred	Staatstheater Saarbrücken (1995); Volksoper Wien (1997)			
Strauss II: Die Fledermaus	Einstein	Semperoper Dresden (2018)			
Strauss II: Die Fledermaus	Gast	Bayerische Staatsoper München (2008, 2012)			
Strauss: Ariadne auf Naxos	Tanzmeister/Brighella	Staatstheater Saarbrücken (1995)			
Strauss: Ariadne auf Naxos	Tenor/Bacchus	Salzburger Festspiele (2012); Paris, Théâtre des Champs-Élysées (2015)			
Strauss: Capriccio	Flamand	Teatro Regio Torino (2002); Edinburgh, Usher Hall (2004)			
Strauss: Der Rosenkavalier	Sänger	Festspielhaus Baden-Baden (2009)			
Smetana: Die Verkaufte Braut	Hans	Oper Frankfurt (2006)			
Wagner: Lohengrin	Lohengrin	Bayerische Staatsoper München (2009, 2013); Bayreuther Festspiele (2010); Milano, Teatro alla Scala (2012); Paris, Opéra Bastille (2017)			
Wagner: Die Meistersinger von Nürnberg	Walther von Stolzing	Edinburgh International Festival (2006); Bayerische Staatsoper München (2016)			
Wagner: Parsifal	Parsifal	Opernhaus Zürich (2006); New York, Metropolitan Opera (2013); Wiener Staatsoper (2013, 2018, 2021); Sydney Opera House (2017); Bayerische Staatsoper München (2018); Wiener Staatsoper (2021)			
Wagner: Parsifal	Vierter Knappe	Staatstheater Saarbrücken (1995)			
Wagner: Tannhäuser	Walther	Opernhaus Zürich (2003)			
Wagner: Tristan und Isolde (2. Akt konzertant)	Tristan	Boston Symphony Orchestra (2018); Carnegie Hall (2018)			
Wagner: Tristan und Isolde	Tristan	Bayerische Staatsoper (2021)			
Wagner: Die Walküre	Siegmund	New York, Metropolitan Opera (2011); Bayerische Staatsoper München (2018)			
Wagner: Die Walküre (1. Akt konzertant)	Siegmund	New York, Metropolitan Opera (2011); Bayerische Staatsoper München (2018); London, Barbican Hall (2017); Gstaad, Menuhin Festival (2018); Gradenegg Festival (2018); Bayerische Staatsoper München (2021)			
Weber: Der Freischütz	Max	Edinburgh, Usher Hall (2004)			

ENGLISH

Work	Role	Venue			
Work	Role	Venue	Britten: Peter Grimes	Peter Grimes	Wiener Staatsoper (2022) Bayerische Staatsoper (2022)
Weber: Oberon	Oberon	Londres Studio (2002)			
Romberg: The Student Prince	Prinz Karl France	Heidelberg Schlossfestspiele (1996, 1997)			

== Awards ==
- 2007 Gramophone Award 2007, Strauss-Lieder, CD
- 2008 Grands prix internationaux du disque, Diapason d'or, Romantic Arias, CD
- 2008 Qobus/Classica: Le meilleur disque de 2008, Romantic Arias, CD
- 2009 Gramophone Award 2009, Madame Butterfly, CD
- 2009 Prix Caecilia 2009, Sehnsucht, CD
- 2009 Diapason d'or 2009, Romantic Arias, CD
- 2010 ECHO Klassik "Bester Sänger des Jahres" for the recording Sehnsucht
- 2010 Orphée d'or "Wolfgang Wagner" 2010, Sehnsucht, CD
- 2010 Diapason d'or 2010, Die schöne Müllerin, CD
- 2010 Diapason d'or 2010, Verismo Arias, CD
- 2011 Gramophone Award 2011, Verismo Arias, CD
- 2011 Diapason d'or 2011, Werther, DVD
- 2012 Medal for "besondere Verdienste um Bayern in einem Vereinten Europa"
- 2012 Gramophone Award 2012, Fidelio, CD
- 2013 International Opera Awards: Opera Magazine Readers Award
- 2013 International Opera Awards: The Male Singer of the Year Award
- 2013 Die Goldene Deutschland
- 2013 Bayerischer Kammersänger – awarded at the end of the performance of Il trovatore, 8 July 2013
- 2013 ECHO Klassik "Sänger des Jahres" for the recording Kaufmann Wagner
- 2013 ECHO Klassik "Operneinspielung des Jahres" (19. Jh.): Mariinsky Orchestra/Valery Gergiev, Wagner: Die Walküre
- 2013 ECHO Klassik "Musik-DVD-Produktion des Jahres": Robert Lepage/Deutsche Grammophon, Der Ring des Nibelungen
- 2013 Gramophone Award 2013, Wagner, CD
- 2014 Golden plate for the Verdi-Album awarded at the end of the Liederabends Winterreise in Graz am 4. April 2014
- 2014 ECHO Klassik "Solistische Einspielung des Jahres/Gesang" (The Verdi Album)
- 2014 Gramophone Classical Music Award 2014 Solo Vocal (Schubert – Winterreise, Jonas Kaufmann and Helmut Deutsch)
- 2014 Bambi for the category "Classical Music"
- 2015 International Opera Awards
- 2015 ECHO Klassik "Sänger des Jahres" for the recording Du bist die Welt für mich
- 2015 Premio Puccini 2015
- 2016 "Service Cross" for the order of the Bundesrepublik Deutschland
- 2016 ECHO Klassik "Bestseller des Jahres" for the Puccini-Album Nessun Dorma
- 2016 Jahrespreis for the recording of Aida (2015) at the Preis der Deutschen Schallplattenkritik
- 2017 ECHO Klassik "Bestseller des Jahres" or the album Dolce Vita
- 2018 Officier de l'Ordre des Arts et des Lettres
- 2018 Bavarian Maximilian Order for Science and Art
- 2019 Goldener Rathausmann der Stadt Wien
- 2020 Honorary Doctorate at the Royal College of Music, give by Prince Charles
- 2020 Opus Klassik, in the category "Classic without boarders" for his album Wien
- 2021 Österreichischer Musiktheaterpreis – Special Media Prize
- 2021 Opus Klassik in the category "Opera Recording of the Year" for Otello
- 2022: Award of Professional title Austrian Kammersänger
- 2022: Opus Klassik in the category "Singer of the Year" for Liszt: Feudvoll und Leidvoll
- 2022: Bayerischer Verfassungsorden
- 2024: Chevalier (Knight) of France's Légion d'Honneur

== Literature ==
- Thomas Voigt: Jonas Kaufmann: In Conversation With. Weidenfeld & Nicolson, 2017, ISBN 978-1-4746-0427-7.
- Thomas Voigt and Christine Cerletti: Jonas Kaufmann: Eine Bilderreise. Stiftung Colla Parte Basel, 2019, ISBN 978-3-903269-75-0
