= Marina Poplavskaya =

Russian opera singer (born 1977)

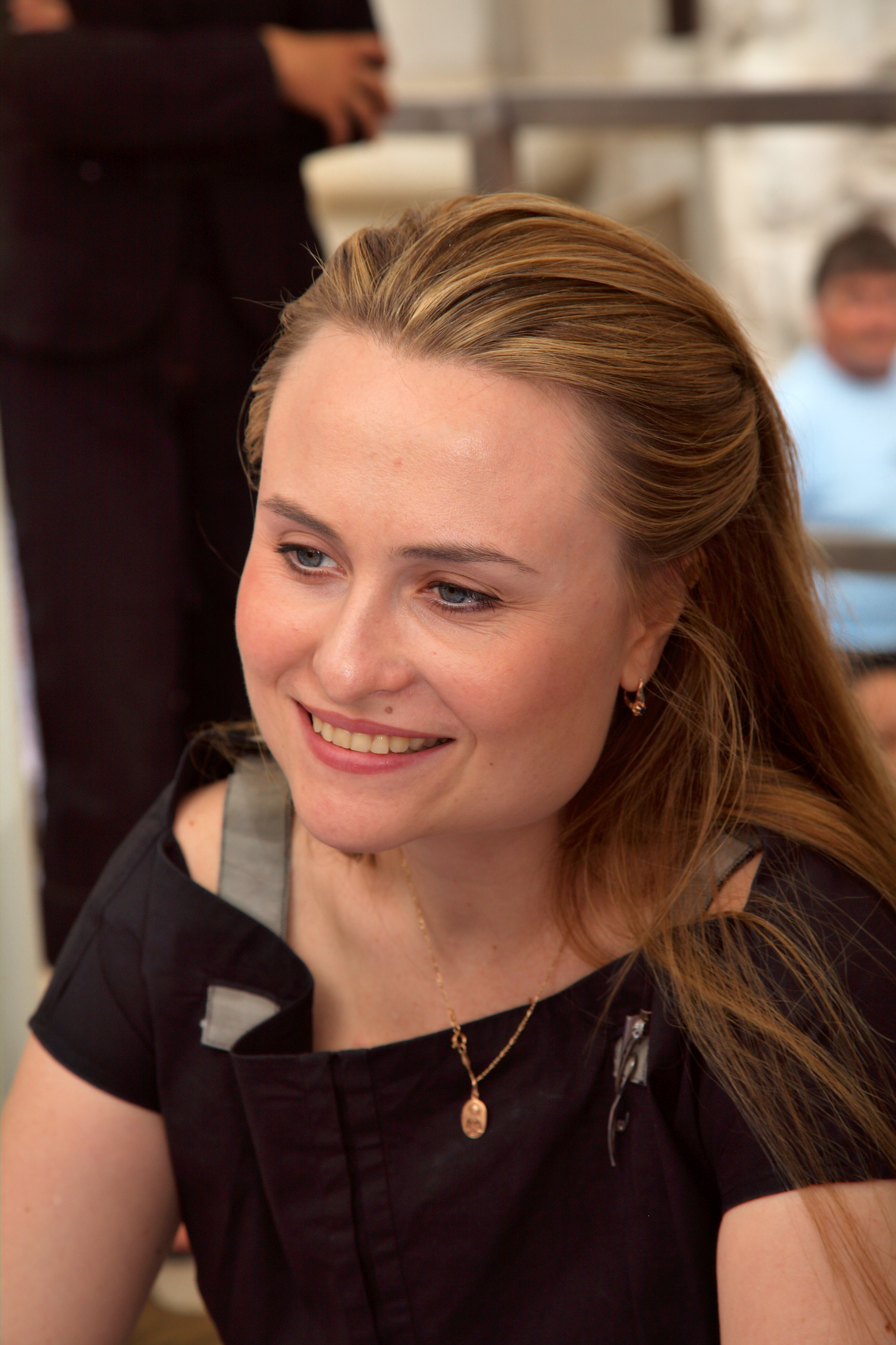
Marina Poplavskaya during the Salzburg Festival in 2008

Marina Poplavskaya (Russian: Марина Поплавская; born September 1977) is a Russian operatic soprano. Her repertoire includes leading roles in operas of the Romantic era; she is particularly known for her performances in the operas of Verdi.

== Early life and training ==
Born in Moscow and educated at the Ippolitov-Ivanov State Music Institute there with professor Peter Tarasov, she sang in the children's chorus of the Bolshoi Theatre from the age of 10. She became a soloist at Moscow's Novaya Opera Theatre, where she performed during 1996–98, and where she was mentored by its founder Yevgeny Kolobov.

== Career ==
Poplavskaya performed as a soloist during 2001–2004 at the Stanislavski and Nemirovich-Danchenko Moscow Academic Music Theatre, and debuted at the Bolshoi Theatre in 2003 as Ann Truelove in Stravinsky's The Rake's Progress; the next year at the Bolshoi she sang Maria in Tchaikovsky's Mazeppa.

In 2005 her association with the Royal Opera, London began when she joined its Young Artists Programme, and in 2006 she received critical acclaim when she sang the title role of Rachel in a London concert performance of Halévy's La Juive.

At the Royal Opera she went on to greater success from 2007, when she performed as Donna Anna in Mozart's Don Giovanni, when as part of the young artists program she was an understudy cover in this production and had to step in for an ailing Anna Netrebko, and Elisabeth de Valois in Nicholas Hytner's new production of Verdi's Don Carlo, which premiered in London in June 2008.

In August 2008, she performed Desdemona in Verdi's Otello at the Salzburg Festival with Riccardo Muti conducting. Richard Fairman, reviewing the performance of 10 August for Opera, wrote "... Marina Poplavskaya’s Desdemona properly fitted the bill, looking a mere slip of a girl and sounding lovely."

In December 2007 after a successful debut at the Metropolitan Opera as Natasha in Prokofiev's War and Peace. she was invited back in 2009 as Liù in Puccini's Turandot, and in 2010 as Elisabetta, when Hytner's production of Don Carlo was taken to New York, and as Violetta in La traviata, in the New York staging of Willy Decker's production, in which she had sung the role at De Nederlandse Opera in 2009 and won The Artist of the Year prize for the best performer. In 2009 she also sang Violetta with great success at the Los Angeles Opera.

She secured the role of Violetta at the Met in 2010 after Anna Netrebko dropped out. In June 2011 Poplavskaya joined the tour at short notice to sing Elisabetta in Don Carlo, after Barbara Frittoli vacated the role in order to replace Netrebko as Mimì in Puccini's La bohème. In the 2011–2012 season Poplavskaya performed Marguerite in Gounod's Faust, including in the Met's HD simulcast on 10 December 2011, and in the fall of 2013 she sang five performances as Tatiana in the Met's new production of Tchaikovsky's Eugene Onegin. Vivian Schweitzer, reviewing the performance for The New York Times, wrote that "Poplavskaya lacks the voluptuous sound of Anna Netrebko, who sang the role of Tatiana on opening night, but offered a more arresting portrayal dramatically."

In October 2014, Poplavskaya withdrew from the Met's productions of The Marriage of Figaro and La traviata. The Met's general manager, Peter Gelb, stated that Poplavskaya "is a wonderful performer, but I know she’s been having some vocal difficulties in recent months." Operabase shows no engagements for her after 2014.

According to a 2020 portrait in Operawire, Poplavskaya was struggling with her voice after her pregnancy in 2014, but has returned to performing and recording, now as a mezzo-soprano, since 2019.

== Videos ==
- 2008: Verdi's Don Carlo (Rolando Villazón as Don Carlo, Marina Poplavskaya as Elizabeth, Simon Keenlyside as Rodrigo, Sonia Ganassi as Eboli, Ferruccio Furlanetto as Philip II, Eric Halfvarson as the Grand Inquisitor), conducted by Antonio Pappano, performed at the Royal Opera House on 14 and 17 June and 3 July 2008
- 2008: Verdi's Otello (Aleksandrs Antonenko as Otello, Marina Poplavskaya as Desdemona, Carlos Álvarez as Iago), Vienna Philharmonic conducted by Riccardo Muti, performed at the Salzburg Festival on 5–10 August 2008
- 2008: Mozart's Don Giovanni (Simon Keenlyside as Don Giovanni, Kyle Ketelsen as Leporello, Eric Halfvarson as the Commendatore, Marina Poplavskaya as Donna Anna, Joyce DiDonato as Donna Elvira, Ramón Vargas as Don Ottavio, Miah Persson as Zerlina, Robert Gleadow as Masetto), conducted by Charles Mackerras, performed at the Royal Opera House on 8 and 12 September 2008
- 2009: Puccini's Turandot (Maria Guleghina as Turandot, Marcello Giordani as Calàf, Marina Poplavskaya as Liù, Samuel Ramey as Timur), conducted by Andris Nelsons, performed at the Metropolitan Opera on 7 November 2009
- 2010: Verdi's Simon Boccanegra (Plácido Domingo as Simon Boccanegra, Marina Poplavskaya as Amelia, Ferruccio Furlanetto as Fiesco, Joseph Calleja as Gabriele Adorno), conducted by Antonio Pappano, performed at the Royal Opera House on 2, 5 and 13 July 2010
- 2010: Bizet's Carmen (Béatrice Uria-Monzon as Carmen, Roberto Alagna as Don José, Marina Poplavskaya as Micaëla, Erwin Schrott as Escamillo), conducted by Marc Piollet, performed at the Gran Teatre del Liceu in Barcelona in October 2010
- 2010: Verdi's Don Carlo (Roberto Alagna as Don Carlo, Marina Poplavskaya as Elizabeth, Simon Keenlyside as Rodrigo, Anna Smirnova as Eboli, Ferruccio Furlanetto as Philipp II, Eric Halfvarson as the Grand Inquisitor), conducted by Yannick Nézet-Séguin, performed at the Metropolitan Opera on 11 December 2010
- 2011: Gounod's Faust (Jonas Kaufmann as Faust, Marina Poplavskaya as Maguerite, René Pape as Méphistophélès), conducted by Yannick Nézet-Séguin, performed at the Metropolitan Opera on 10 December 2011
- 2012: Verdi's Il Trovatore (Marina Poplavskaya as Leonora, Misha Didyk as Manrico, Scott Hendricks as Count di Luna, Sylvie Brunet-Grupposo as Azucena), conducted by Marc Minkowski, performed at the Théâtre de la Monnaie in June 2012
- 2012: Meyerbeer's Robert le diable (Bryan Hymel as Robert, Marina Poplovskaya as Alice, Patrizia Ciofi as Isabelle, John Relyea as Bertram, Jean-François Borras as Raimbaut), conducted by Daniel Oren, performed at the Royal Opera House on 15 December 2012
