= Christoph Strehl =

German tenor

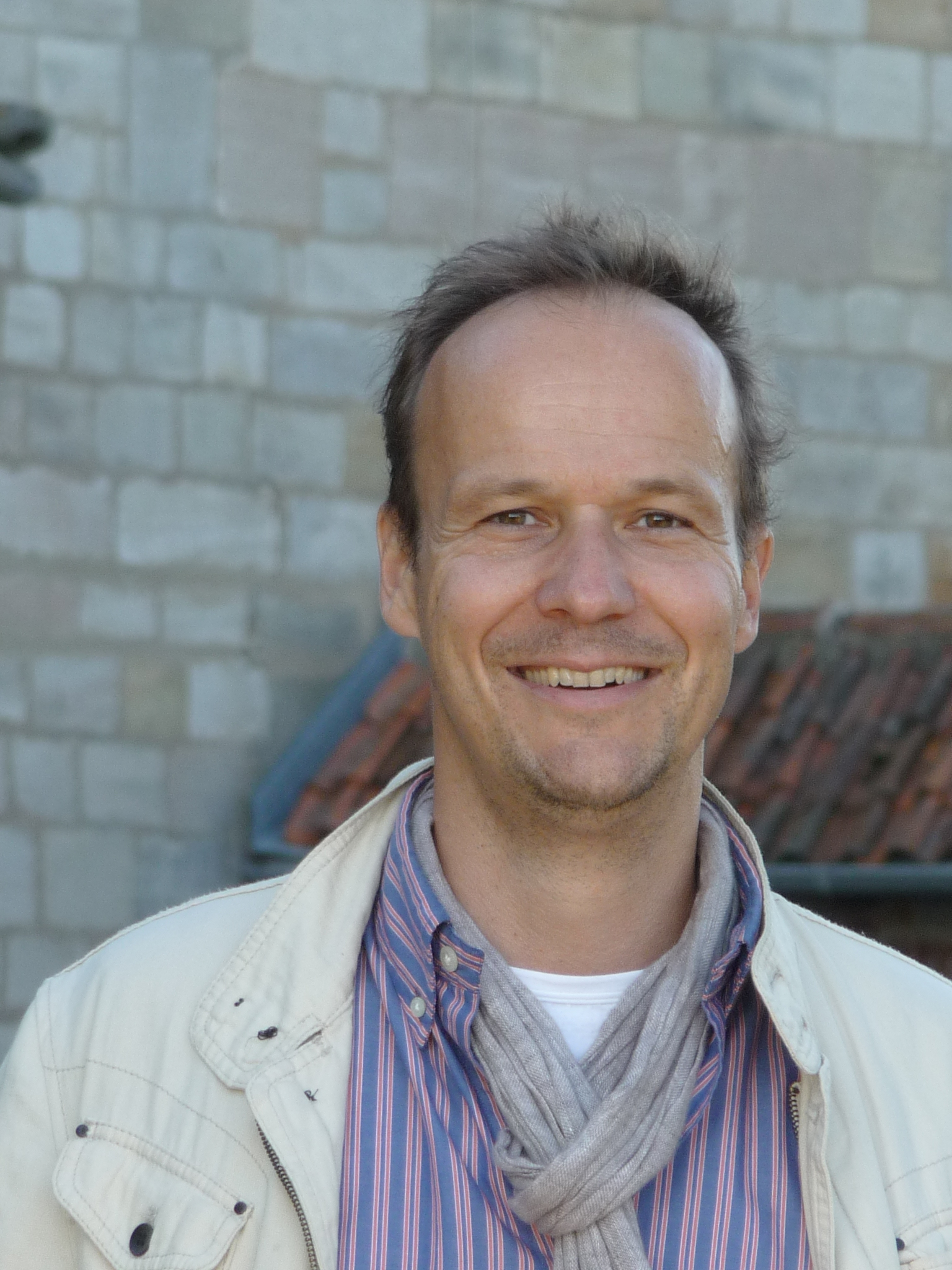
- Christoph Strehl in 2011
- Born: 8 April 1968 (age 57); Lübeck, Schleswig-Holstein, West Germany
- Education: Universität der Künste Berlin; Folkwang-Hochschule
- Occupations: Operatic tenor; Academic teacher
- Organizations: Opernhaus Zürich; Opernhaus Dortmund; Mozarteum

Christoph Strehl (born 8 April 1968) is a German tenor in opera and concert. He has appeared at major opera houses internationally, regarded as a specialist for Mozart roles, but performing a broad repertoire. He appeared as Don Ottavio in Mozart's Don Giovanni at the Salzburg Festival conducted by Nikolaus Harnoncourt and as Tamino in Die Zauberflöte with Claudio Abbado on the conductor's first recording of the opera. He is a professor of voice at the Mozarteum in Salzburg.

== Career ==
Born in Lübeck, Strehl attended the Carl-Jacob-Burckhardt-Gymnasium, where Barbara Grusnick, Bruno Grusnick's wife, discovered his talent. Encouraged by her, he studied voice at the Universität der Künste Berlin, and at the Folkwang-Hochschule in Essen with Soto Papulkas. He studied privately with Silvana Bazzoni Bartoli, and took masterclasses with Josef Metternich, Gianni Raimondi and Norman Shetler. He achieved first prize at the Alexander Girardi International Singing Competition in Coburg in 1999.

Strehl made his debut at the Hagen Theatre in 1995. After permanent engagements at the Landestheater Coburg and the Theater Hof, he joined the Mannheim National Theatre as a lyric tenor, where Ádám Fischer conducted. He became a member of the Opernhaus Zürich in 2002, with Alexander Pereira as artistic director. There, he performed the role of Eginhard in Schubert's Fierrabras, directed by Carl Guth and conducted by Franz Welser-Möst, with Jonas Kaufmann in the title role. Engaged by Jens-Daniel Herzog, he was a member of the Opernhaus Dortmund from 2011 to 2015. His new roles included the title role of Eliogabalo in Cavalli's opera, conducted by Fausto Nardi.

Strehl was recognised internationally when he performed for the first time at the Salzburg Festival in 2003, as Don Ottavio in Mozart's Don Giovanni conducted by Nikolaus Harnoncourt. He performed mainly Mozart roles as a guest at the Bavarian State Opera in Munich, in Vienna and London, at the Metropolitan Opera in New York, in Aix-en-Provence, Geneva, Barcelona and Amsterdam. In 2009, he performed in the Haydn Hall at the Eszterháza palace in Eisenstadt, on the occasion of the 200th anniversary of Joseph Haydn's death, singing the tenor solo in Die Schöpfung alongside Annette Dasch and Thomas Quasthoff with the Wiener Kammerchor and the Austro-Hungarian Haydn Philharmonic conducted by Fischer.

Strehl has been a professor of voice at the Mozarteum University Salzburg.

== Recordings ==
In 2005, Strehl recorded the role of Tamino in Mozart's Die Zauberflöte conducted by Claudio Abbado, the conductor's first recording of the work, with the Arnold Schoenberg Choir the Mahler Chamber Orchestra. Reviewer Alan Blyth from Gramophone noted:

Christoph Strehl, a name new to me but already in great demand in Mozart on the Continent, sings with a Wunderlich-like strength and beauty, and rather more light and shade than his famous predecessor brought to the role. His is a wonderfully virile, vital reading that gives pleasure to the ear, as much in ensemble as in aria.

Strehl recorded the role of Eginhard in the Fierabras production from Zürich as DYD in 2006. He recorded the role of Tamino again with Harnoncourt in the Zürich production directed by Martin Kuej in 2008. In 2009, he was the tenor soloist in a recording of Beethoven's Ninth Symphony, with Philippe Herreweghe conducting the Royal Flemish Philharmonic and the Collegium Vocale Gent, and soloists Christiane Oelze, Ingeborg Danz and David Wilson-Johnson.
