= Emily Magee =

American opera singer

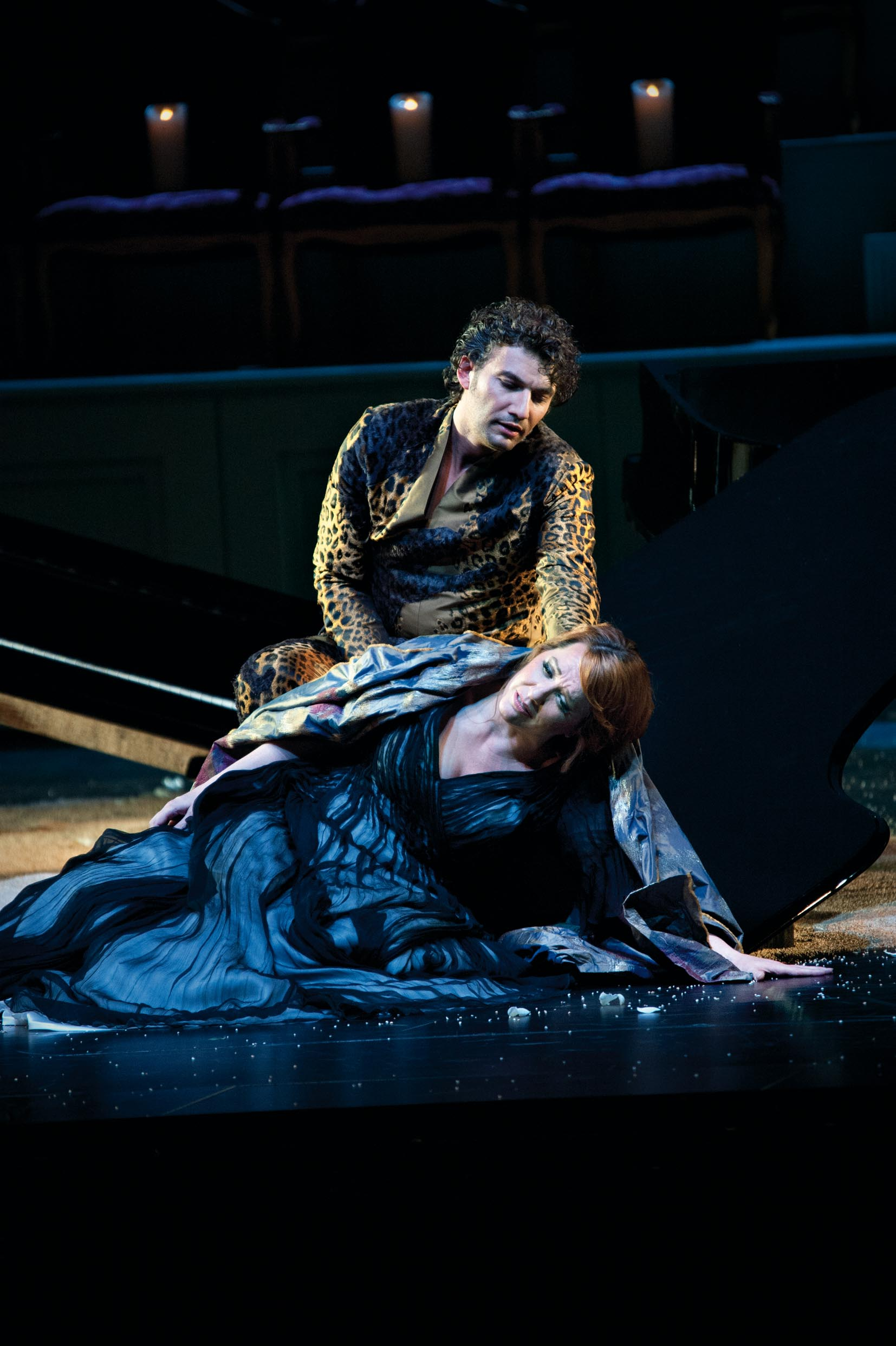
Emily Magee as Ariadne and Jonas Kaufmann as Bacchus, Salzburg Festival 2012

Emily Magee (born October 31, 1965) is an American operatic soprano.

Born in New York City, Magee studied music at Westminster Choir College, from which she graduated in 1987. She continued her studies at the Jacobs School of Music of Indiana University Bloomington, where her teachers included Margaret Harshaw.

In 1995, Magee made her operatic debut at the Lyric Opera of Chicago, singing the role of Fiordiligi in Mozart's Così fan tutte. Her international debut came in 1996 at the Berlin State Opera, under the direction of Daniel Barenboim. Magee's selected recordings, on CD and DVD, include:

- Lohengrin (Elsa), with Peter Seiffert; conductor: Daniel Barenboim
- Die Meistersinger von Nürnberg (Eva); conductor: Daniel Barenboim
- Peter Grimes (Ellen Orford); conductor: Franz Welser-Möst
- Ariadne auf Naxos (Ariadne); Zürich Opera; conductor: Christoph von Dohnányi
- Rusalka; conductor: Franz Welser-Möst
- Tosca, with Jonas Kaufmann and Thomas Hampson; Zürich Opera
- Salome; Frankfurt Radio Symphony; conductor: Andrés Orozco-Estrada

Magee and her husband live in Boulder, Colorado, US.
