= Helmut Deutsch =

Austrian classical pianist

Helmut Erich Deutsch (born 24 December 1945) is an Austrian classical pianist, specialising in chamber music and lieder accompaniment.

Deutsch was born in Vienna, where he studied piano, composition and musicology at the Vienna Music Academy from 1967 until 1979. He was awarded the Vienna Composition Prize in 1967. He was professor for lied interpretation and performance (Professor für Liedgestaltung) at the Hochschule für Musik und Theater München (University of Music and Performing Arts Munich) from 1986 until 2011. He is still guest professor there and at other German universities. He has been teaching at the Hochschule für Musik und Darstellende Kunst Frankfurt and the Frankfurt Opera. Deutsch gives master classes throughout Europe and in Japan and is a juror at the BBC Cardiff Singer of the World competition.

Deutsch began his career as accompanist working with Irmgard Seefried, and he collaborated with Hermann Prey for more than twelve years. Other prominent singers he accompanied were Olaf Bär, Barbara Bonney, Grace Bumbry, Ileana Cotrubaș, Diana Damrau, Annette Dasch, Brigitte Fassbaender, Matthias Goerne, Hans Hotter, his former student Jonas Kaufmann, Angelika Kirchschlager, Keith Lewis, Anne Sofie von Otter, Josef Protschka, Andreas Schmidt, Peter Schreier, Mauro Peter, Bo Skovhus, Rita Streich, Michael Volle and Bernd Weikl. Among his many collaborative recordings are the complete vocal works of Johannes Brahms. Deutsch performed in recitals at the Salzburg Festival with Olaf Bär (1999), Jonas Kaufmann (2009), Hermann Prey (1982, 1984, 1985, 1991), Thomas Quasthoff (2012), and Michael Volle (2010, 2012).

A review of a 2011 CD of songs by Liszt, sung by Diana Damrau, noted:

Frequently the piano line in these settings is just as complex, intense and as interesting as the vocal part which is not surprising given Liszt's renown as a virtuoso pianist and Helmut Deutsch proves himself a truly outstanding interpreter.
