= Christiane Lutz =

German opera director (born 1980)

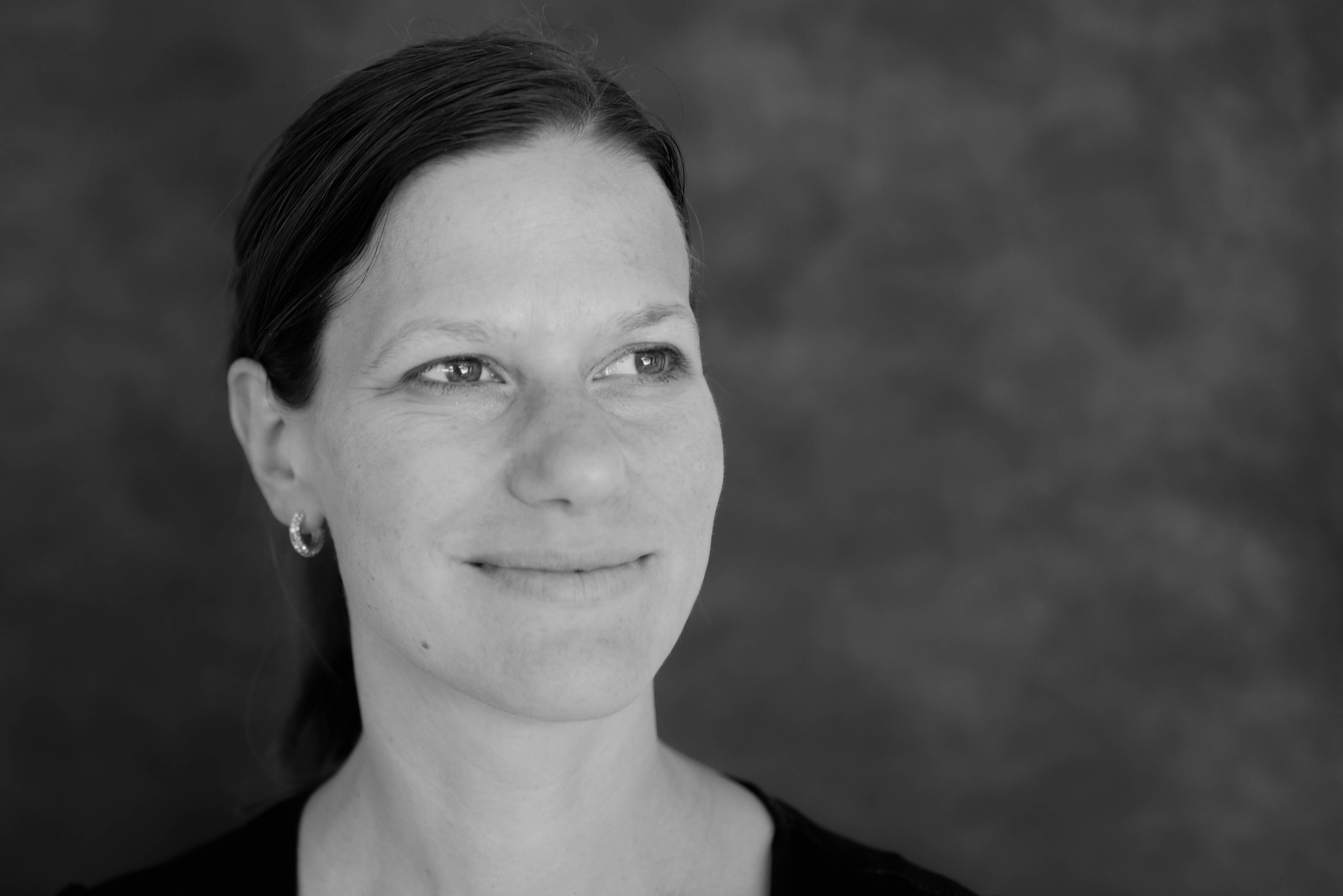
- Lutz in 2019
- Born: 1980 (age 45–46); Mainz, Germany
- Occupation: Director
- Years active: 2005–present

Christiane Lutz (born 1980 in Mainz) is a German opera director.

== Biography ==
Lutz lives in Vienna, where she began studying theatre studies, art history, musicology and business administration, and then continued to study stage direction at the University of Music and Performing Arts Vienna.

She gathered her first experiences in stage directing with Peter Konwitschny and Achim Freyer. Christiane Lutz was employed as an opera director at the Theater Lübeck and after that at the Opernhaus Graz, where she directed Alcina by Georg Friedrich Händel amongst other pieces. From 2009 to 2011, Lutz was assistant director to Michael Sturminger on the international tour of The Infernal Comedy – Confessions of a Serial Killer and The Giacomo Variations starring John Malkovich in the title role. She started working closely with opera director Claus Guth in 2011. From 2012 to 2014 Christiane Lutz coordinated the children's opera tent of the Wiener Staatsoper, where she directed the premiere of the piece Das Städtchen Drumherum, written by the Austrian composer Elisabeth Naske.

Her current productions include Reigen at the Opéra National de Paris, Wozzeck at the Staatstheater Cottbus, La traviata at the Operklosterneuburg and Manon at the Salzburger Landestheater.

Lutz is married to the tenor Jonas Kaufmann. They have one child together.

== Productions ==
Opera	Venue	Premiere
Manon	Salzburger Landestheater	2018
La traviata	Operklosterneuburg	2018
Wozzeck	Staatstheater Cottbus	2017
Reigen	Opéra National de Paris	2017
The Rake's Progress	Johannes Gutenberg-Universität Mainz	2017
The Consul	Bayerische Staatsoper	2017
Hänsel und Gretel	Wiener Kammeroper	2016
Der Kaiser von Atlantis	Semperoper Dresden	2016
Die Schneekönigin	Schloss Eisenstadt	2015
Pictures at an Exhibition	Philharmonie Luxembourg	2015
Rinaldo	Wiener Kammeroper	2014
Ein Wintermärchen	Philharmonie Luxembourg	2014
A Midsummer Night's Dream	Philharmonie Luxembourg	2014
Der Junge und das Meer	MuTh	2013
Das Städtchen Drumherum	children's opera tent of the Wiener Staatsoper	2013
Die Meistersinger von Nürnberg	youth opera camp Salzburger Festspiele	2013
Der Tierkreis	Wiener Konzerthaus	2012
Erwin, das Naturtalent	Staatstheater Augsburg	2011
Das ist doch der Gipfel	Opernhaus Graz + Wiener Konzerthaus	2011
Aida	Staatstheater Augsburg	2010
Hexe Hillary geht in die Oper	Staatstheater Augsburg	2010
Opern der Zukunft	Opernhaus Graz	2009
Nabucco	Opernhaus Graz	2009
Alcina	Opernhaus Graz	2007
Die schöne Galathée	Kammeroper Schloss Reinsberg	2006
Ariodante	University of Music and Performing Arts Vienna	2005

== Awards and stipends ==
Lutz received scholarships from the Bayreuther Festspiele and the Salzburger Festspiele. She was a finalist at the Ring award in 2014.
