= Bruno Grusnick =

German church musician

Bruno Grusnick (18 October 1900 – 4 August 1992) was a German musicologist and church musician.

== Life ==
Grusnick came from Spandau and had already become acquainted with the musical aspirations of the German Youth Movement as a youth and student. From 1919 to 1925, in addition to music and musicology, he also studied German, English and sport. In the field of music and musicology, Hermann Kretzschmar, Max Friedlaender, Johannes Wolf, Curt Sachs, Georg Schünemann and Wilibald Gurlitt were among his teachers.

On 1 April 1928, he came to Lübeck as Studienrat to the Ernestinenschule. On 4 May 1928, he founded the Lübeck Singing and Playing Circle, which was influenced by the Jugendmusikbewegung, to spend their free time together doing sports, hiking and making music together. But already in the founding year, there were also public performances: for example, at the folk dance festival in the Wallanlagen and on 21 October, a first spiritual concert. He soon met the pastor of the Jakobikirche, who had also been appointed in 1928. Axel Werner Kühl, in 1930, he became cantor at St. Jakobi, a post he was to hold until 1972. The very next year, he met Hugo Distler, who took up the position of organist at the church in 1931 through the mediation of Günther Ramin. Working closely together, Grusnick performed many of Distler's choral works, helping him to break through with performances at music festivals and music days throughout Germany and Europe, especially at the Kassel Music Days in 1935. In February 1931, Kühl, Distler, and Grusnick introduced the then-new service form of Musical Vespers in St. Jakobi, which soon became a firm tradition. In addition to Distler's modernism, Grusnick's choir work focused on the Baroque composers Heinrich Schütz, Johann Sebastian Bach and soon Buxtehude. As early as 1931, Grusnick made several study trips to Uppsala, where he undertook source research on Buxtehude's vocal works in the Düben Collection of the university library there, in the research and processing of which he was to play a decisive role in the decades to come. He subsequently published eleven chorale cantatas and one solo cantata by Buxtehude in the Bärenreiter-Verlag, as well as sacred concertos by Christoph Bernhard that had survived in the collection. He was thus one of the most important editors of Buxtehude's vocal works.

After war service and imprisonment from 1939 to 1946, he returned to Lübeck. In 1948, he was appointed Kirchenmusikdirektor. In 1949, he established the tradition of performing Bach's St Matthew Passion in St. Jakobi from three different galleries. In 1952, he had the overall direction of the 29th "German Bach Festival" of the Neue Bachgesellschaft, which took place in Lübeck. In the same year, he brought the Hugo-Distler Archive to Lübeck. He made his last trip to Uppsala in 1986 and published a printable copy of the Buxtehude cantata on "Nun danket alle Gott" before the end of 1990.

== Honours ==
- Honorary doctor of the Uppsala University (1966)
- Buxtehude-Preis der Hansestadt Lübeck (1969), with Walter Kraft
- Bundesverdienstkreuz am Bande (24 November 1970).

== Work ==
- (ed.) Weihnachtsnachtigall. Deutsche Weihnachtslieder für Schule und Haus. Lübeck: Westphal 1928
- Eine Buxtehude-Fahrt nach Upsala in Der Wagen 1932, pp. 88–93
- Dietrich Buxtehude: Leben u. Werke, Bärenreiter Kassel 1937
- Hugo Distler, Lübeck 1982
- Hugo Distler und Hermann Grabner, erweiterter Sonderdruck aus Musica (1964), 18. Jg., H. 2
- Wie Hugo Distler Jakobiorganist in Lübeck wurde, Sonderdruck aus Musik und Kirche (1958), 28. Jg., H. 3
- Alec Hyatt King / Bruno Grusnick (Übers.): Mozart im Spiegel der Geschichte : 1756–1956. Eine kritische u. bibliographische Studie, Bärenreiter Kassel 1956
- 29. Deutsches Bachfest der Neuen Bachgesellschaft vom 5.–8. September 1952 in Lübeck – Bach-Fest-Buch, Neue Bachgesellschaft Kassel 1952
- Die Dübensammlung. Ein Versuch ihrer chronologischen Ordnung, in: Svensk tidskrift för musikforskning, xlviii (1966), 70
