= John Relyea =

Canadian opera singer

John Relyea (born 1972 in Toronto) is a Canadian-American operatic bass.

He was born in 1972 in Toronto, Ontario, Canada, to American-born Gary Relyea and Estonian mother Anna Tamm-Relyea. Both parents are opera singers and voice teachers. He first studied voice at age 17 with his father.

Relyea attended the Curtis Institute of Music vocal program in Philadelphia. He later continued his vocal training with renowned American operatic bass Jerome Hines, voice teacher Armen Boyajian, and with Bulgarian bass Nicolai Ghiuselev.

After attending the Curtis Institute he continued his training as an apprentice in the San Francisco Opera's Adler Fellowship. He has appeared in over 20 roles on the San Francisco Opera stage.

His international opera career began in 2000 as Alidoro in Rossini's La Cenerentola, in a highly-acclaimed debut with Metropolitan Opera. He has since appeared there in over 240 performances.

His vast repertoire of roles has seen him appear with major international opera houses including the Royal Opera House, the Opera National de Paris, Bayerische Staatsoper, La Scala, Liceu of Barcelona, Teatro Real of Madrid, Canadian Opera Company, and many others.

Throughout his career he has been renowned for interpretations of the role of Figaro in Le Nozze de Figaro, Mephisto in Berlioz’s La Damnation de Faust and Gounod’s Faust, King Marke in Wagner’s Tristan und Isolde, and the title role of Bartok’s Bluebeard’s Castle. He most frequently performs roles of Verdi and Wagner.

He has also performed a wide span of concert repertoire with major Symphony Orchestras worldwide, including the Berlin Philharmonic, London Symphony Orchestra, London Philharmonic, New York Philharmonic, Boston Symphony Orchestra, Chicago Symphony, Cleveland Orchestra, LA Philharmonic, Toronto Symphony, Montreal Symphony, Philharmonie de Paris, Swedish Radio Orchestra, and NDR Hamburg.

Mr Relyea currently resides in Rhode Island with his wife and two sons.
