= Isabel Rey =

Spanish operatic soprano (born 1966)

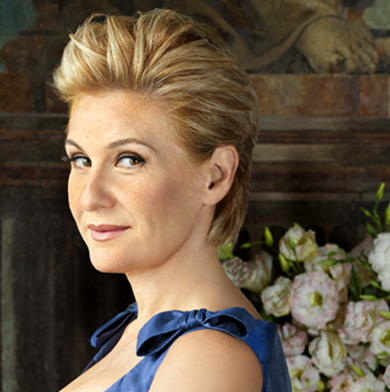
Isabel Rey

Isabel Rey (born 22 March 1966 in Valencia) is a Spanish operatic soprano who has performed leading roles in the opera houses of Europe and appears on many recordings.

== Discography ==
- Handel: Semele – Conductor: William Christie; Rey, Bartoli, Workman (DECCA 2009)
- Donizetti: Don Pasquale – Conductor: Nello Santi; Rey, Flórez, Raimondi (DECCA 2009)
- Mozart: La finta giardiniera – Conductor: Nikolaus Harnoncourt; Mei, Rey, Schaschina (TKD 2008)
- Boccherini: Stabat Mater – Conductor: Frizza; Rey, Barcellona (DECCA 2007)
- Debussy: Pelléas et Mélisande – Conductor: Welser-Möst; Rey, Gilfry, Volle, Kalish (TKD 2006)
- Purcell: King Arthur – Conductor: Harnoncourt, Isabel Rey, Bonney, Remmert, (Salzburg Festival 2005)
- Manuel Fernández Caballero: El dúo de la africana – Conductor: López Cobos; Rey, Rodríguez, Orozco, (Deutsche Grammophon 2004).
- Mozart: Le nozze di Figaro – Conductor: Harnoncourt; Gilfry, Mei, Rey, Chausson (TKD 2009).
- Varios: Arias y dúos de ópera – Conductor: Bragado; Rey, Gavanelli (RTVE).
- Monteverdi: Il ritorno d'Ulisse in Patria – Conductor: Harnoncourt; Rey, Kasarova, Henschel (ARTHAUS 2002).
- Mozart: Don Giovanni – Conductor: Harnoncourt, Rey, Gilfry, Polgar, Bartoli (ARTHAUS 2001).
- Various: Las Damas del Canto – Rey, De los Ángeles, Berganza, Scotto, Caballé, Bayo, Arteta (RTVE Música 2001).
- César Cano: Te Deum – Conductor: Galduf; Rey, Mentxaca, Cid (Petagas S.A. 2001).
- Various: Canciones para la navidad – Piano: Zabala; Isabel Rey (Discmedi 1999).
- Various: Natsu no Omoide – Guitar: Suzuki; Isabel Rey (Discmedi 1999)
- Mozart: Le nozze di Figaro – Conductor: Harnoncourt; Rey, Hampson, Margiono, Bonney (Teldec 1994)
- Various: The Passion of Spain – Rey, Carreras (Teldec 1993)
- Various: Opera Gala – Rey, Caballé, De los Ángeles, Carreras, González, Pons (RTVE 1992).

== Sources ==
- Cummings, David (ed.), "Rey, Isabel", International Who's Who in Classical Music, Routledge, 2003, p. 654. ISBN 1-85743-174-X
- Llorente, J. Antonio, "Isabel Rey, soprano: «Voy a ser una tía estupenda para el resto de mis dias»" (in Spanish), ABC, 24 August 2004
- Rus, César, "El talento de Isabel Rey" (in Spanish), Las Provincias, 25 June 2006
