= Georg Schünemann =

German musicologist

Georg Schünemann (13 March 1884 – 2 January 1945) was a German musicologist.

== Life ==
Born in Berlin, Schünemann, the son of a rector, was awarded a doctorate after studying music in 1907 with his dissertation on the history of conducting. After his habilitation and in 1919 he became professor, deputy director and 1932 director of the Berlin Musikhochschule in 1920. As a collaborator of Leo Kestenberg he was concerned with the reorganization of schools and private music education.

After the takeover by Nazism he was "granted leave" as director of the university after denunciations, but immediately afterwards became head of the state collection of musical instruments. From 1935 he was director of the music department of the Prussian State Library. Since 1936 Schünemann was co-editor of the journal Archiv für Musikforschung. Since March 1933 Schünemann had been a member of the NSDAP civil servants' association. After he had presented a "de-jewed" new translation of Mozart's opera Le nozze di Figaro in 1940, he became deputy chairman of the Reichsstelle für Musikbearbeitungen, a subdivision of the Reich Ministry of Public Enlightenment and Propaganda. During the Second World War he also worked in the music department of the Amt Rosenberg as well as in the Reichsleiter Rosenberg Taskforce at short notice.

Schünemann also translated the Don Giovanni libretto into German. The opera was performed with his text in 1961 in the Deutsche Oper Berlin by Carl Ebert with Dietrich Fischer-Dieskau, Elisabeth Grümmer and Josef Greindl.

Schünemann died in Berlin at the age of 60. His ashes were interred at Stahnsdorf South-Western Cemetery.

== Work ==
- Geschichte des Dirigierens (1913)
- Geschichte der deutschen Schulmusik (1928)
- Musikerziehung I (1930)
- Geschichte der Klaviermusik (1940)
- Die Sing-Akademie zu Berlin. 1791–1941, Gustav Bosse Verlag, Regensburg (1941).
