= Anja Harteros =

German soprano (born 1972)

- Born: 23 July 1972 (age 54); Bergneustadt, North Rhine-Westphalia, West Germany
- Education: Hochschule für Musik Köln
- Occupation: Soprano singer
- Years active: 1996–present
- Title: Bavarian Kammersängerin
- Awards: Bavarian Order of Merit

Anja Harteros (born 23 July 1972) is a German soprano. Since winning the 1999 Cardiff Singer of the World competition she has been particularly associated with the Bavarian State Opera and enjoyed an international career.

In her earlier career she had an affinity towards Mozartian roles such as the Countess in The Marriage of Figaro, Donna Anna in Don Giovanni. Over the years, she has been taking up heavier roles in 19th-century German and Italian operas, particularly those by Verdi and Wagner.

She was named Bavarian Kammersängerin in 2007, and was awarded the Bavarian Order of Merit in 2018.

== Life and career ==
=== Early years ===
Harteros was born in Bergneustadt, North Rhine-Westphalia, to a Greek father and a German mother and has two siblings, Alexia and Georgios. As a child, she was encouraged by her parents to pursue classical music and singing. Eventually, her music teacher at the Wüllenweber-Gymnasium in Bergneustadt, August Wilhelm Welp, noticed her considerable talent and recommended that she be professionally educated in singing. In 1986, she started voice training under Astrid Huber-Aulmann in Gummersbach, concurrently with her schooling. In 1990, she began studies with Wolfgang Kastorp, conductor and répétiteur at the Cologne Opera, who accompanied her in a series of concerts and later became her husband. Her first performances were in music institute concerts and in a school production of The Marriage of Figaro in 1990, as the Countess. In 1992 she gave her first concert at the Kantonsschule Schwyz in Switzerland.

After completing high school in 1991, she continued her voice studies under Liselotte Hammes at the Hochschule für Musik Köln. Her original singing teacher, Huber-Aulmann, continued to teach her until early 1996, and Harteros accompanied Huber-Aulmann on concerts tours in 1993 and 1994 to Russia and the United States, which attracted much attention to the singer. Just before her final exams, she was employed as an ensemble member of the Schillertheater NRW. After her 1996 exams, she joined the ensemble of the Theater Bonn.

=== International career ===
Harteros achieved the major breakthrough for her career when she won the Cardiff Singer of the World competition in the summer of 1999, becoming the first German singer to win the prize. Peter Jonas, director of the Bavarian State Opera, who was in the jury, recognised her talent and engaged her in the role of Agathe in Der Freischütz. She became a frequent guest singer with the company, starring in roles such as Countess Almaviva (The Marriage of Figaro), Fiordiligi (Così fan tutte), Mimì (La bohème), and among others she later took up. She has also appeared at other major opera houses, including the Vienna State Opera, Oper Frankfurt, De Nederlandse Opera in Amsterdam, Semperoper, Cologne Opera, and Berlin's Deutsche Oper.

In 2001, she performed Fiordiligi in Così fan tutte in a new production at the Opéra National de Lyon and concert performances at the Edinburgh International Festival. In February 2002, she sang her first Wagnerian role, Freia in Das Rheingold, in the premiere of Herbert Wernicke's new production at the Bavarian State Opera. She made her Paris Opera debut in the role of Micaëla in Carmen, and then repeated the role at the Vienna State Opera. She performed in The Magic Flute as the First Lady at the Salzburg Festival, and later at the Hamburg State Opera, as Eva in Die Meistersinger von Nürnberg in Peter Konwitschny's controversial new production.

In 2003/04, Harteros made her New York Metropolitan Opera debut with Countess Almaviva, and also sang Donna Anna in Don Giovanni in the same season.

In 2004, she sang her first Violetta in La traviata with the San Diego Opera, where she returned the next year for her first Amelia in Simon Boccanegra. In the 2004/05 season, she made four role debuts at the Bavarian State Opera, including Desdemona (Otello), Arabella (Arabella), Alice Ford (Falstaff), and the title role in a new production of Händel's Alcina as a part of the Munich Opera Festival. In 2006, she portrayed Elettra in Idomeneo at the Salzburg Festival, and Desdemona in Vera Nemirova's new staging of Otello at the Semperoper in Dresden.

In 2008, she was featured in the opening gala of Oslo Opera House, and in the first opera production in the house, Don Carlo, debuting in the role of Elisabetta di Valois. She made her Royal Opera, London debut with Simon Boccanegra.

In February 2011, she debuted in Leonora in concert performances of Verdi's Il trovatore at the Kölner Philharmonie. Withdrawing from the planned debuting performances as the Marschallin in Strauss' Der Rosenkavalier in San Diego, she assumed the role in Munich and then in Vienna later in the year.

In general, Harteros has restricted her professional appearances to attend to her family. Christian Thielemann, a regular collaborator with Harteros, has noted this aspect of her life:

"If you have somebody at home you want to take care of, and need to, it's more than logical that you do it."

== Awards ==
Harteros won the Festival Award of the Munich Opera Festival for her four role debuts. She was voted Female Singer of the Year (Sängerin des Jahres) by the Opernwelt magazine in 2009, and again in 2017. On 19 June 2010, she received the first edition of Cologne Opera Award (Kölner Opernpreis) from city mayor Jürgen Roters with laudation from Peter Jonas in a ceremony in the Cologne City Hall, which was to take place on 17 April but postponed due to the 2010 Icelandic volcano eruption. She won the Best Female Singer in the 2015 International Opera Awards.

In 2007, she was appointed the title Bavarian Kammersängerin. In 2013, she was awarded the Bavarian Europa-Medaille. In 2018, she was awarded European Cultural Award Taurus, yet she was absent from the ceremony at the Dresden Frauenkirche on 8 June 2018. In the same month, she received the Bavarian Order of Merit. Following her Tosca performance on 3 November 2019 at the Bavarian State Opera, celebrating her 20th anniversary since her debut with the company, she was awarded the Meistersinger-Medaille in honour of her artistic contribution.

== Opera roles ==
- Countess Almaviva, The Marriage of Figaro (Mozart)
- Agathe, Der Freischütz (Weber)
- Mimì, La bohème (Puccini)
- Fiordiligi, Così fan tutte (Mozart)
- Freia, Das Rheingold (Wagner)
- Micaëla, Carmen (Bizet)
- First Lady, The Magic Flute (Mozart)
- Eva, Die Meistersinger von Nürnberg (Wagner)
- Donna Anna, Don Giovanni (Mozart)
- Violetta, La traviata (Verdi)
- Desdemona, Otello (Verdi)
- Arabella, Arabella (Strauss)
- Alice Ford, Falstaff (Verdi)
- Amelia, Simon Boccanegra (Verdi)
- Alcina, Alcina (Handel)
- Elisabeth, Tannhäuser (Wagner)
- Elettra, Idomeneo (Mozart)
- Elisabetta de Valois, Don Carlos (Verdi)
- Elsa, Lohengrin (Wagner)
- Leonora, Il trovatore (Verdi)
- The Marschallin, Der Rosenkavalier (Strauss)
- Floria Tosca, Tosca (Puccini)
- Leonora, La forza del destino (Verdi)
- Amelia, Un ballo in maschera (Verdi)
- Magdalena, Andrea Chénier (Giordano)
- Sieglinde, Die Walküre (Wagner)
- Isolde, Tristan und Isolde (Wagner)

== Discography ==
=== Solo recitals ===
- Bella Voce (2006). Pinchas Steinberg, Wiener Symphoniker. (RCA Red Seal)
- Von ewiger Liebe (2009). Wolfram Rieger. (Berlin Classics)

=== Complete works ===
- Verdi: La traviata (2006). Zubin Mehta. Farao Classics. Live recording: Bavarian State Opera
- Handel: Alcina (2007). Ivor Bolton. Farao Classics. Live recording: July 2005 Munich Opera Festival
- Strauss: Eine Alpensinfonie, Vier letzte Lieder (2007). Fabio Luisi, Staatskapelle Dresden. Sony Classical
- Requiem (Verdi) (2009). Antonio Pappano, Orchestra dell'Accademia Nazionale di Santa Cecilia. Warner Classics
- Wagner: Lohengrin (2010). Bavarian State Opera. Decca/Unitel Classica [DVD]
- Handel: Alcina (2011). Vienna State Opera. Arthuas Musik [DVD]
- Symphony No. 2 (Mahler) (2012). Mariss Jansons, Chor und Symphonieorchester des Bayerischen Rundfunks. BR Klassik
- Requiem (Verdi) (2013). Daniel Barenboim. Decca. Live recording: 2012, La Scala
- Verdi: La forza del destino (2014). Bavarian State Opera. Sony Classical/Unitel Classica [DVD]
- Requiem (Verdi) (2015). Lorin Maazel, Münchner Philharmoniker, Philharmonischer Chor München. Sony Classical. Live recording: February 2014
- Verdi: Aida (2015). Jonas Kaufmann. Antonio Pappano, Orchestra dell'Accademia Nazionale di Santa Cecilia. Warner Classics

== Documentary ==
- Wie ein lichter Fluss: Die Sängerin Anja Harteros (2016). Christian Betz. premiered on 17 September 2016 on 3sat.
