= Eric Halfvarson =

American operatic basso (born 1951)

Eric Halfvarson (born December 1, 1951, in Aurora, Illinois) is an American operatic bass. He made his professional debut in 1973 with the Lake George Opera (now the Opera Saratoga) as Don Basilio in Rossini's The Barber of Seville. Since then he has specialized in the repertoire for the basso profundo, singing such roles as the Grand Inquisitor in Verdi's Don Carlos, Sarastro in Mozart's The Magic Flute, Baron Ochs in Der Rosenkavalier by Richard Strauss and Wagner's König Heinrich in Lohengrin, Hagen in Götterdämmerung and Hunding in Die Walküre, as well as Claggart in Britten's Billy Budd. He has sung in many theaters including the Lyric Opera of Chicago, the Metropolitan Opera in New York City, the Royal Opera House in London, La Fenice in Venice, La Scala in Milan, the Wiener Staatsoper and Deutsche Oper Berlin. He has taken part in the Bayreuth Festival.
