= Ekaterina Semenchuk =

Russian opera singer (born 1976)

Ekaterina Semenchuk (born 24 March 1976, in Minsk), is a Belarusian operatic mezzo-soprano.

== Career ==
Ekaterina Semenchuk studied at the Rimsky-Korsakov Saint Petersburg State Conservatory. She made her debut with the Mariinsky Opera in 2000 and has performed numerous roles with that company. Her international career has taken her to many of the world's leading opera houses, including The Royal Opera, London, where she first appeared in 2008 as Olga in Eugene Onegin and has since returned as Azucena in Il trovatore and Princess Eboli in Don Carlos. In 2005 she sang at the wedding of Prince Charles and Camilla, Duchess of Cornwall. Semenchuk is particularly associated with roles in Verdi operas and in addition to Azucena and Eboli has appeared in that composer's Nabucco as Fenena, as Lady Macbeth in Macbeth, as Federica in Luisa Miller, Preziosilla in La forza del destino and Amneris in Aida, appearing in one or more of these roles at the Mariinsky, the Salzburg Festival, Teatro Real Madrid, Washington National Opera, Opéra national de Paris, San Francisco Opera, and many others. Ekaterina Semenchuk made her debut at the Metropolitan Opera New York as Sonya in War and Peace in 2002 and has since returned there as Paulina in The Queen of Spades, Marina in Boris Godunov, the mezzo-soprano soloist in the Verdi Requiem, Santuzza in Cavalleria Rusticana, and has even moved into dramatic soprano repertoire such as the title role in Turandot.

== Selected discography ==
- As Marina in Boris Godunov (2010), HD video: Met Opera on Demand
- As Eboli in Don Carlo (2013), DVD: Sony Classical, Cat: 88843005769; Blu-ray: Cat: 88843005779
- As Amneris in Aida (2015), CD: Warner Classics, Cat: 2564610663
- As Santuzza in Cavalleria Rusticana (2018), Streaming audio: Met Opera on Demand
