= Jerome Hines =

American operatic bass (1921–2003)

Jerome A. Hines (November 8, 1921 – February 4, 2003) was an American operatic bass who performed at the Metropolitan Opera from 1946 to 1987. Standing 6'6½", his stage presence and stentorian voice made him ideal for such roles as Sarastro in The Magic Flute, Mephistopheles in Faust, Ramfis in Aida, the Grand Inquisitor in Don Carlos, the title role of Boris Godunov and King Mark in Tristan und Isolde.

== Early life and education ==
Hines was born Jerome Albert Link Heinz in Hollywood. He studied mathematics and chemistry at the University of California, Los Angeles, and took private voice lessons. He was half-an-inch too tall for the military, so during World War II he worked for an oil company.

== Music ==
Hines made his operatic debut at the San Francisco Opera in 1941 as Monterone in Rigoletto. He changed his surname to Hines at the suggestion of his manager Sol Hurok to avoid the anti-German feelings prevalent during World War II.

In 1946, Hines made his debut at the Metropolitan Opera as the Sergeant in Boris Godunov. He went on to sing for a record 41 seasons there, including becoming the first US-born singer to tackle the title role of Boris Godunov in 1954. In 1953, he made his European debut with Glyndebourne Festival as Nick Shadow at the Edinburgh Festival in the first British performances of Stravinsky's The Rake's Progress. In 1958, he made his debut at La Scala in the title role of George Frideric Handel's Hercules. From 1958 to 1963, he sang at Bayreuth in the roles of Gurnemanz, King Mark and Wotan.

In 1961, he first appeared at the San Carlo in the title role of Arrigo Boito's Mefistofele. In 1962, he sang Boris Godunov at the Bolshoi in Moscow, famously for Soviet leader Nikita Khrushchev on the eve of the resolution of the Cuban Missile Crisis. He turned to coaching later in his career, founding the Opera-Music Theatre Institute of New Jersey in 1987, but he continued performing virtually until the end of his life; among his last appearances was a concert performance as the Grand Inquisitor with the Boston Bel Canto Opera in 2001 at the age of 79.

Hines composed an opera on the life of Jesus, I Am the Way. He sang the role of Jesus at the Met in 1968 (though not in a staged production of his opera) and performed the work many times around the world.

Hines wrote a memoir, This is My Story, This is My Song (1969) ISBN 0-8007-0313-8, and two books on singing, The Four Voices of Man (1997) ISBN 0-87910-099-0 and Great Singers on Great Singing (1982) ISBN 0-87910-025-7.

== Mathematics ==
In the 1950s, Hines contributed the following scholarly articles to Mathematics Magazine:

- 1951: "On approximating the roots of an equation by iteration", Mathematics Magazine 24(3):123–7 MR 1570498
- 1952: "Foundations of Operator Theory", Mathematics Magazine 25:251–61 MR 0047101
- 1955: "Operator Theory II", Mathematics Magazine 28(4):199–207 MR 1570730
- 1955: "Operator Theory III", Mathematics Magazine 29(2):69–76 MR 1570767
- 1956: "A Generalization of the S-Stirling numbers", Mathematics Magazine 29:200–3 MR 0076939

Hines did not accept the theory of transfinite numbers that had been put forward by Georg Cantor. As Opera News reported in 1991, he was collaborating with Henry Pollack, formerly of Bell Labs, on "a new look at the philosophy of mathematics".

== Personal life ==
Hines was married to the soprano Lucia Evangelista from 1952 until her death from amyotrophic lateral sclerosis in 2000. They had four children. He was a born-again Christian and a member of the Salvation Army. Hines became a vegetarian in 1972. It was later reported that he strayed from his vegetarian diet by eating chicken and fish.

=== Death ===
A resident of Scotch Plains, New Jersey, Hines died of undisclosed causes in 2003 at age 81 at Mount Sinai Hospital in Manhattan.
