= List of compositions by Alexander Goehr =

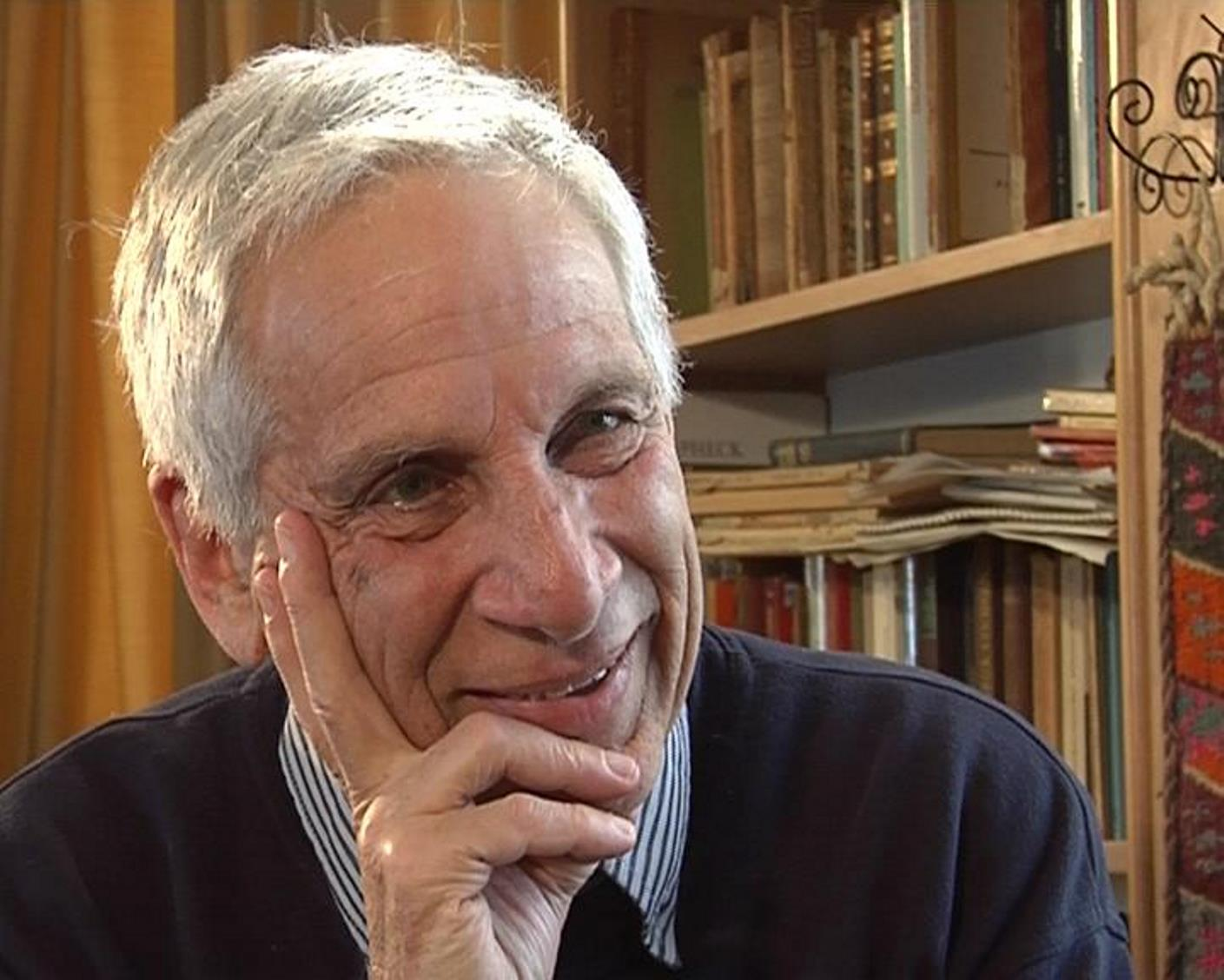
Alexander Goehr in 2007

The English composer of German birth Alexander Goehr (1932–2024) wrote a wide range of orchestral, vocal, chamber and solo music, alongside numerous operas.

== List of compositions ==
Goehr's music was published by Schott.

=== Chronology ===
- 1951: Songs of Babel
- 1952: Piano Sonata, Op. 2
- 1954: Fantasias for clarinet and piano, Op. 3
- 1957: Capriccio for piano, Op. 6
- 1957–58: The Deluge, Op. 7
- 1959: Variations for flute and piano, Op. 8; Four Songs from the Japanese, Op. 9; Sutter's Gold, Op. 10
- 1956–57: String Quartet No. 1
- 1959–61: Hecuba's Lament, Op. 12
- 1961: Suite, Op. 11
- 1961–62: Violin Concerto, Op. 13
- 1962: Two Choruses, Op. 14
- 1963: Virtutes, a cycle of nine songs and melodramas; Little Symphony, Op. 15; Little Music for Strings, Op. 16
- 1964: Five Poems and an Epigram of William Blake, Op. 17; Three Pieces for Piano, Op. 18
- 1965: Pastorals, Op. 19
- 1966: Piano Trio, Op. 20; Arden Must Die (opera), Op. 21
- 1966–67: Warngedichte (for mezzo-soprano and piano), Op. 22
- 1967: Three Pieces from Arden Must Die, Op. 21a; String Quartet No. 2, Op. 23
- 1968: Romanza (cello concerto), Op. 24; Naboth's Vineyard, Op. 25
- 1969: Konzertstück, Op. 26; Nonomiya, Op. 27; Paraphrase for clarinet, Op. 28; Symphony in One Movement, Op. 29
- 1970: Shadowplay, Op. 30; Concerto for Eleven, Op. 32
- 1971: Sonata about Jerusalem, Op. 31
- 1972: Piano Concerto, Op. 33
- 1973–74: Chaconne for Wind, Op. 34
- 1974: Lyric Pieces, Op. 35; Metamorphosis/Dance, Op. 36
- 1976: String Quartet No. 3, Op. 37; Psalm IV, Op. 38a; Fugue on the Notes of Psalm IV, Op. 38b
- 1977: Romanza on the Notes of Psalm IV, Op. 38c
- 1979: Babylon the Great is Fallen (cantata), Op. 40; Chaconne for organ, Op. 34a; Das Gesetz der Quadrille, Op. 41; Sinfonia, Op. 42
- 1981: Deux Etudes, Op. 43; Behold the Sun (dramatic scena), Op. 44a
- 1984: Cello Sonata, Op. 45
- 1985: Behold the Sun (opera); ...a musical offering (J.S.B. 1985)..., Op. 46; Two Imitations of Baudelaire, Op. 47
- 1986: Symphony with Chaconne, Op. 48
- 1988: Eve Dreams in Paradise, Op. 49; ...in real time, Op. 50
- 1990: Sing Ariel, Op. 51; String Quartet No. 4, Op. 52
- 1992: The Death of Moses (cantata), Op. 53; Colossus or Panic for orchestra, Op. 55
- 1993: The mouse metamorphosed into a maid for unaccompanied voice, Op. 54
- 1995: Arianna, Op. 58
- 1996: Schlussgesang for orchestra, Op. 61; Quintet Five objects Darkly, Op. 62
- 1996: Three Songs, Op. 60
- 1997: Idées Fixes for ensemble, Op. 63; Sur terre, en l'air, Op. 64
- 1999: Kantan and Damask Drum
- 2000: Piano Quintet, Op. 69; Suite, Op. 70
- 2002: ...a second musical offering, Op. 71; ...around Stravinsky, Op. 72; Symmetry Disorders Reach for piano, Op. 73
- 2003: Marching to Carcassonne, Op. 74; Adagio (Autoporträt), Op. 75
- 2004: Dark Days, Op. 76
- 2005: Fantasie, Op. 77
- 2006: Broken Lute, Op. 78
- 2008: Since Brass, nor Stone..., fantasy for string quartet and percussion, Op. 80; Manere, duo for clarinet and violin, Op. 81; Overture for ensemble, Op. 82
- 2008–09: Promised End, opera in twenty-four preludes (scenes) to words from Shakespeare's King Lear, Op. 83
- 2009: Broken Psalm for mixed choir (SATB) and organ, Op. 84
- 2010: Turmmusik (Tower Music) for two clarinets, brass and strings with baritone solo, Op. 85
- 2011: When Adam Fell for orchestra, Op. 89
- 2011–12: To These Dark Steps / The Fathers are Watching for tenor, children's choir and ensemble, Op. 90
- 2013: ... between the Lines Chamber symphony for eleven players, Op. 94
- 2014–15: Verschwindendes Wort for mezzo-soprano, tenor and ensemble, Op. 97
- 2015–16: Two Sarabands for orchestra, Op. 98
- 2016: The Master Said for narrator and chamber orchestra, Op. 99
- 2018: Vision of the Soldier Er (String Quartet No. 5) for string quartet, Op. 102

=== Works by genre ===
==== Chamber ====
- Suite, Op. 11
- String Quartet No. 2, Op. 23
- String Quartet No. 3, Op. 37
- ...a musical offering (J.S.B. 1985)..., Op. 46
- Quintet Five objects Darkly, Op. 62
- Idées Fixes for ensemble, Op. 63
- Since Brass, nor Stone..., fantasy for string quartet and percussion, Op. 80

==== Vocal ====
- The Deluge (cantata), Op. 7
- Psalm IV, Op. 38a
- Das Gesetz der Quadrille, Op. 41
- Sing Ariel (cantata), Op. 51
- The Death of Moses (cantata), Op. 53
- Three Songs, Op. 60

==== Orchestral ====
- Little Symphony, Op. 15
- Symphony in One Movement, Op. 29
- Metamorphosis/Dance, Op. 36
- Sinfonia, Op. 42
- Symphony with Chaconne, Op. 48
- Colossos or Panic, Op. 55
- Schlussgesang, Op. 61

==== Opera ====
- Arden Must Die
- Behold the Sun
- Arianna, Op. 58
- Kantan and Damask Drum, Op. 67
- Promised End
