= Bohumil Herlischka =

Czech opera director

- Born: 25 April 1919; Čáslav, Czechoslovakia
- Died: February 2006 (aged 86–87); Düsseldorf
- Occupation: Opera director
- Organizations: Deutsche Oper am Rhein; Hamburg State Opera; Oper Frankfurt

Bohumil Herlischka (25 April 1919 – February 2006) was a Czech opera director. After years at the National Theatre, he worked from 1957 predominantly in German opera houses, introducing a style later known as Regietheater (director's theatre). He directed several productions at the Oper Frankfurt and developed a close connection to the Deutsche Oper am Rhein where he staged operas by Leoš Janáček, presenting a cycle of six operas in the 1977–78 season. He staged Schoenberg's Moses und Aaron at the Hamburg State Opera, including a tour to Israel. He focused on rarely played works such as Meyerbeer's Le prophète at the Deutsche Oper Berlin and on contemporary opera such as Shostakovich's Lady Macbeth of the Mtsensk District and the world premiere of Alexander Goehr's Behold the Sun.

== Life ==
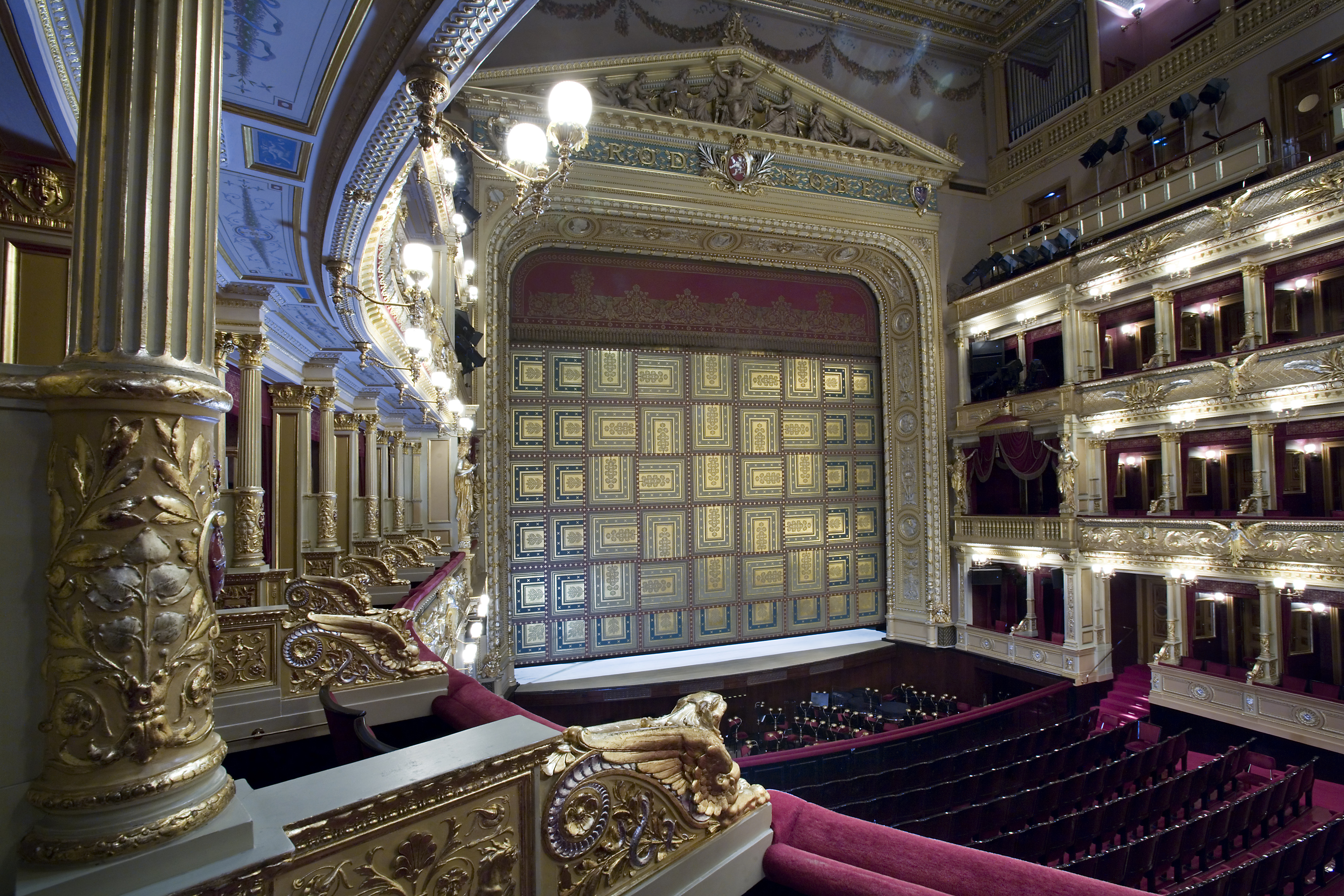
Inside the Czech National Theatre, where Herlischka began his career

Born in Čáslav on 25 April 1919, Herlischka worked as a stage director at the National Theatre in Prague from 1951 to 1957. He then emigrated to the West, where he worked at German opera houses such as the Deutsche Oper Berlin, the Oper Frankfurt, the Cologne Opera, the Bavarian State Opera in Munich, and the Deutsche Oper am Rhein in Düsseldorf and Duisburg.

He staged the original version of Shostakovich's Lady Macbeth of the Mtsensk District in 1959 in a style which later was called Regietheater (director's theatre). The same year, he directed Nicolai's Die lustigen Weiber von Windsor at the Oper Frankfurt, conducted by Felix Prohaska. A year later, he staged Mussorgsky's Boris Godunov there, conducted by Georg Solti.

In Düsseldorf, he staged Weber's Der Freischütz in 1961, but met with strong opposition as he did not stage the traditional "happy ending". In 1964, he directed Bizet's Carmen in Frankfurt, and a year later Tchaikovsky's Pique Dame. Also in 1964 he directed a production of Franz Schreker's Der ferne Klang at the Staatstheater Kassel, the first staging of a Schreker opera after his music had been banned by the Nazis in 1933. In 1971, he directed Gounod's Faust (in Germany traditionally called Margarethe) at the Oper Frankfurt, conducted by Christoph von Dohnányi.

Herlischka worked for television in 1962, directing the play fragment Woyzeck by Georg Büchner. The press reacted mostly negatively to a different order of scenes, compiled from different versions, with some omissions. The review in the weekly Die Zeit noted that words were repeated in an artificial way and that the social aspects of the plot were neglected. In 1964, he directed Meyerbeer's Le prophète at the Deutsche Oper Berlin, conducted by Heinrich Hollreiser, with James McCracken in the title role. A reviewer regarded it as a persiflage by a cynical director. In the 1973–74 season, Herlischka staged Schoenberg's Moses und Aaron at the Hamburg State Opera. The opera had been regarded as impossible to perform, and the world premiere was given in Hamburg in 1954 in a concert performance, conducted by Hans Rosbaud. Herlischka's production, with Franz Mazura as Moses and Richard Cassilly as Aaron and conducted by Horst Stein, was also shown in Israel.

Similar to Walter Felsenstein at the Komische Oper Berlin, he was a pioneer of expressive-poetic theatre and his performances were revived again and again over several years. He introduced the operas by Leoš Janáček to Western Europe. In Düsseldorf, he staged a cycle of six of his operas from 1969 to 1977, when they were all performed as a cycle. The first was Jenůfa in 1969, in a stage design by Hermann Soherr. Astrid Varnay, the singer of the Kostelnička, wrote in her memoirs that Herlischka knew exactly how to present the emotions of peasants from Moravia. While she resented his authoritarian attitude, she admired his sense for the visual. It was followed by Das schlaue Füchslein (The Cunning Little Vixen) in 1972, Káťa Kabanová in 1973, Die Sache Makropulos (The Makropulos Affair) in a double bill with Die Ausflüge des Herrn Brouček (The Excursions of Mr. Brouček to the Moon and to the 15th Century) in 1974, and finally Aus einem Totenhaus (From the House of the Dead) in 1977. In the 1977–78 season, all six operas were presented as a cycle at the Deutsche Oper am Rhein, conducted by Peter Schneider in a stage design by Ruodi Barth. It was the only such cycle outside Czechoslovakia. In 1986, he staged the opera Schicksal (Destiny), which was regarded as an important step in bringing the composer's works to the stage.

Herlischka staged Janáček's Das schlaue Füchslein also at the Hamburg State Opera, both in 1976, conducted by Armin Jordan, and in 1981, conducted by Lawrence Foster. He staged Mozart's Le nozze di Figaro at the Staatstheater am Gärtnerplatz in Munich in 1977, conducted by Heinz Drewanz. In 1985, he directed Alexander Goehr's Behold the Sun – Die Wiedertäufer (Sehet die Sonne), an opera commissioned for the 25th anniversary of the Deutsche Oper am Rhein, based on a libretto by John McGrath. It premiered on 19 April 1985, conducted by Hiroshi Wakasugi, in a set designed by Ruodi Barth.

Herlischka died in Düsseldorf in February 2006, at age 86.

== Legacy ==
Edited by Ilka Kügler, a book reflecting Herlischka's work for the opera stage, Ein Magier der Bühne:Der Regisseur Bohumil Herlischka (A Magician of the Stage:The Director Bohumil Herlischka), appeared in the series Dokumente zur Theatergeschichte (Documents of theatre history) in Düsseldorf in 1989.

== Sources ==
- Genossenschaft Deutscher Bühnen-Angehöriger (publisher), Deutsches Bühnen-Jahrbuch 2007, Verlag Bühnenschriften-Vertriebs-Gesellschaft mbH, Hamburg, 2007, p. 854 ISSN 0070-4431
