= John Cameron (baritone) =

Australian operatic singer (1918–2002)

Cameron, left, as Point in The Yeomen of the Guard, with Kenneth Sandford as Wilfred, 1962

John Ewen Cameron (20 March 1918 – 29 March 2002) was an Australian baritone singer, who made most of his career in Britain. He became known for his portrayal of characters in modern operas by composers from Australia, Britain and continental Europe, and for his recordings with conductors such as Sir Thomas Beecham, Sir Adrian Boult, the young Colin Davis, and particularly Sir Malcolm Sargent.

Following early concert and operatic experience in Australia he moved to Britain in 1949. He soon was engaged at Covent Garden, where he sang smaller, and some substantial, roles for three seasons. He next sang at Glyndebourne. Over the next 25 years Cameron pursued a career, in both Britain and Australia, in which concert work and recordings played as great a part as opera. From 1976 until the last months of his life Cameron was a teacher on the staff of the Royal Northern College of Music in Manchester.

== Early life and career ==
Cameron was born in Coolamon, New South Wales. He was in the Second Australian Imperial Force during the Second World War, serving in the Middle East. He sang in troop concerts, and on returning to Australia after the war he decided to pursue a professional career. He studied at the New South Wales State Conservatorium in Sydney, and by the late 1940s he was performing in the concert hall, and in opera, including Il trovatore in 1947. In 1948 after a nationwide singing competition Cameron and a fellow prize-winner, Joan Sutherland, sang under the baton of Eugene Goossens at a concert in Sydney. With Goossens's encouragement, Cameron moved to Britain in 1949.

The Covent Garden Opera Company, founded three years earlier, engaged Cameron on Goossens's recommendation. He made his debut playing the Jesuit emissary Rangoni in Boris Godunov in November 1949. He played minor parts for the company in Lohengrin, Tosca, Carmen and Parsifal, and created roles in the premieres of The Pilgrim's Progress and Billy Budd. His two most substantial parts for the company were Germont senior in La traviata and the Speaker of the Temple in The Magic Flute. (Note: In the English translation of La traviata used by Covent Garden at that time, the character was called Georges Duval, following Dumas' original story, rather than Giorgio Germont, as in Piave's Italian adaptation for Verdi. Obituaries in The Guardian and The Independent state that it was in this role that Cameron made his Covent Garden debut, but the Royal Opera archives show that he did not play it until nearly a year after joining the company. Alan Blyth in The Guardian states also that Cameron played Mozart's Figaro at Covent Garden, but the Royal Opera House archives show that Geraint Evans was the only performer to play the role for the company between January 1949 and November 1956.) After the end of his three-year contract with Covent Garden, Cameron was engaged by the Glyndebourne Festival to sing Arbace in Mozart's Idomeneo and in two roles in Gluck's Alceste.

== Peak years ==
Throughout his career Cameron returned frequently to Australia; between 1949 and 1974 he performed with the Elizabethan Trust Opera Company and its successors. During the Mozart bicentenary year of 1956 he sang Figaro, Papageno in The Magic Flute and Guglielmo in Così fan tutte for the productions in Sydney, in a company headed by Sena Jurinac and Sesto Bruscantini.

Cameron became known for his performances in operas by modern composers. Between 1957 and 1974 he appeared in A Tale of Two Cities (Arthur Benjamin, 1957), The Prisoner (Luigi Dallapiccola, 1959), Diary of a Madman (Humphrey Searle, 1960), The Sorrows of Orpheus (Darius Milhaud, 1960), Punch and Judy (Harrison Birtwistle, 1968), Cardillac (Paul Hindemith, 1970), The Trial (Gottfried von Einem, 1973) and Arden Must Die (Alexander Goehr, 1974).

During this period Cameron pursued a parallel career in concert and on record. He was a favourite soloist of Sir Malcolm Sargent, with whom he appeared in recordings of works including Mendelssohn's Elijah (1957), Elgar's The Dream of Gerontius (1958), John Gay's The Beggar's Opera (1955), also recording the latter work under Richard Austin for Argo, and, between 1957 and 1962, eight Gilbert and Sullivan operas (Trial by Jury, H.M.S. Pinafore, The Pirates of Penzance, Patience, Iolanthe, The Mikado, The Yeomen of the Guard and The Gondoliers). Cameron played the role of Jack Point in The Yeomen of the Guard in New York in 1962 and at open-air performances at the Tower of London in 1962 and 1964. Howard Taubman in The New York Times praised Cameron as "a Jack Point [who] can act and a clown who can sing".

Other conductors with whom Cameron recorded were Sir Thomas Beecham, in Delius's Songs of Sunset (1955) and a radically edited version of Handel's Solomon (1956); Sir Adrian Boult, in Vaughan Williams's A Sea Symphony (1954) and Busoni's Doktor Faust (1959); Colin Davis, in Berlioz's L'enfance du Christ (1960) and Béatrice et Bénédict (1962); Bruno Maderna, in Ravel's L'heure espagnole (1960); Sir Anthony Lewis, in Purcell's King Arthur (1960); Roger Wagner, in Belshazzar's Feast (1960); and Leopold Stokowski, in music from Messiah (1966).

== Later years ==
In 1976 Cameron began a teaching career, joining the faculty of the Royal Northern College of Music. He remained there for another 25 years and was still teaching as a member of staff until the last few months of his life. In his later years, according to the music writer Elizabeth Forbes, "he concentrated on teaching lieder, stressing, as he had demonstrated himself throughout his career, the importance of words in conjunction with music." Among his pupils were the baritones Simon Keenlyside and Gidon Saks.

Cameron died in London at the age of 84. His second wife predeceased him; he was survived by his daughter from his first marriage.

== Notes and references ==
Notes
