= Gidon Saks =

Israeli-born South African bass-baritone (born 1960)

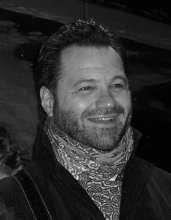
Gidon Saks

Gidon Saks (born 15 January 1960) is an Israeli-born South African bass-baritone.

== Education ==
Saks grew up in South Africa. His father was son of Lithuanian-Jewish émigrés whilst his mother was of Scottish and Ukrainian descent. He had an aunt who was an accomplished opera singer in South Africa but he had no interest in singing at first. He had originally wished to become an actor, dropping out of school at the age of sixteen because "I hated it". He auditioned for drama school at the Little Theatre under the direction of Mavis Taylor but was told he had to be eighteen for admission and they suggested he study singing in the meantime. He began his musical studies under Angelo Gobatto, the director of the opera school at the South African College of Music which is a department of the University of Cape Town. In order to avoid the military conscription which was mandatory for all white South African males at the time, he moved to the U.K. to study at the Royal Northern College of Music, after a year at opera school in Cape Town. While still a student at Northern College, he began drawing designs for college productions and these were used in Brecht/Weill's Happy End, Mascagni's Cavalleria rusticana, Mozart's Don Giovanni and Berg's Wozzeck.

== Early career ==
At the age of 22, at the urging of his voice teacher in Toronto, Patricia Kern, he debuted in Brian Macdonald's production of The Mikado at the 1982 Stratford Shakespeare Festival in Canada, which went on tour as well as being televised. With the Canadian Opera Company, he sang the role of Lord Rochefort in Donizetti's Anna Bolena, with Dame Joan Sutherland; Daland in Der fliegende Holländer; Wurm in Luisa Miller; Bluebeard in Bluebeard's Castle and Boris Godunov. He acknowledged in an interview that his performances at this early time in his career were sometimes less than polished. Nevertheless, his admiration for Kern borders on the religious in his own estimation, such was her inspiration and influence on his career.

== Switzerland ==
As has been the case with many aspiring opera singers, the experience Saks gained by performing with some of the myriad small state-funded opera companies on the continent was invaluable. He earned a scholarship to the Zürich Opera Studio which led to a three-year contract at the Musiktheater im Revier in Gelsenkirchen, Germany. Later he earned another three-year contract at the Bielefeld Opera in Bielefeld, Germany. During this time he began to receive engagements to sing in Berlin and he performed in the opening concert in the Berliner Festwochen (Berlin Festival) in César Franck's Beatitudes under the direction of Vladimir Ashkenazy.

== Designing and directing ==
As well as designing the production, he directed Giovanni Paisiello's Il barbiere di Siviglia at the Gattières Festival in France, and as a free-lancer has designed four operas for the Scottish Opera, Glasgow, where he also produced and directed Maurice Ravel's L'enfant et les sortilèges and Puccini's La bohème. Later he was responsible for the successful design and direction of the premier of Le Grand Macabre by György Ligeti in Vienna. He also directed Georges Bizet's Carmen, Richard Strauss's Ariadne auf Naxos and Wolfgang Amadeus Mozart's Die Zauberflöte with the Berlin Opera Academy.

== Repertoire ==
He has sung at the Royal Opera House where he made his debut in 1995 as Flint in Billy Budd, the Opéra National de Paris, the San Francisco Opera, the Berlin State Opera, the Houston Grand Opera, the Teatro Real in Madrid, the New York City Opera, at La Monnaie in Brussels, the English National Opera, Welsh National Opera, Scottish Opera, New Israeli Opera, and the Grand Théâtre de Genève. He has also been heard at the KlangBogen Festival in Vienna.

Recent years have included the roles of Dr. Pangloss in Bergen National Opera's production of Leonard Bernstein's Candide, Hagen (Götterdämmerung) for Seattle Opera and in London for English National Opera, Pizarro (Fidelio) and Kaspar (Der Freischütz) for the Deutsche Staatsoper, Philip II (Don Carlos) in Geneva and Palermo, Boris Godunov (title role) in London and Toronto, Claggart (Billy Budd) in Paris and London, Nick Shadow (The Rake's Progress) in London, Daland (Der fliegende Holländer), Kochubei (Mazeppa) for Welsh National Opera, Hunding (Die Walküre), Hagen (Götterdämmerung), and Scarpia (Tosca) for Washington National Opera, and the 4 villains (The Tales of Hoffmann) at the Royal Opera House.

Saks has sung world premiere performances of several roles including George Moscone in Stewart Wallace's Harvey Milk for the Houston Grand Opera, New York City Opera and San Francisco Opera which was recorded on Teldec with Donald Runnicles conducting, Hamilcar in Philippe Fénelon's Salammbô at the Opéra Bastille, and the Messenger in Alexander Goehr's Arianna at the Royal Opera House.

== Influences ==
In an interview, Saks spoke about his early love of Leontyne Price's sound, as well as being impressed with Franco Corelli, Brigitte Fassbaender and "inevitably" Maria Callas. He was helped greatly in his development by his voice teacher at Northern College, John Cameron, as well as Patricia Kern who encouraged him to go out and audition while he was still a student in Canada. More recently, after his voice was damaged in a Wagnerian role (Der Fliegender Hollander), he sought out voice teacher Susanna Eken of whom he said, "It's fair to say that she rescued me, not so much because my voice was a mess but because my confidence had gone".

== Recordings ==
Recordings include the title roles in Handel's Saul and Hercules, Claggart (Billy Budd), Apollyon and Lord Hate-Good (The Pilgrim's Progress, Ralph Vaughan Williams). He has also appeared in film versions of Anna Bolena and The Mikado. He sang the part of Scarpia in a production of Tosca for Austrian television, an excerpt of which was used in the 2008 James Bond film Quantum of Solace.

== Teaching ==
Saks is also founder and artistic director of Opera Garden, the Aberdeen International Youth Festival's Opera Project. He gives vocal master classes at various establishments, was a member of staff at the Royal Conservatory of Ghent in Belgium and currently teaches at Universität der Künste in Berlin.
