= Theater Duisburg =

Opera house in Duisburg, Germany

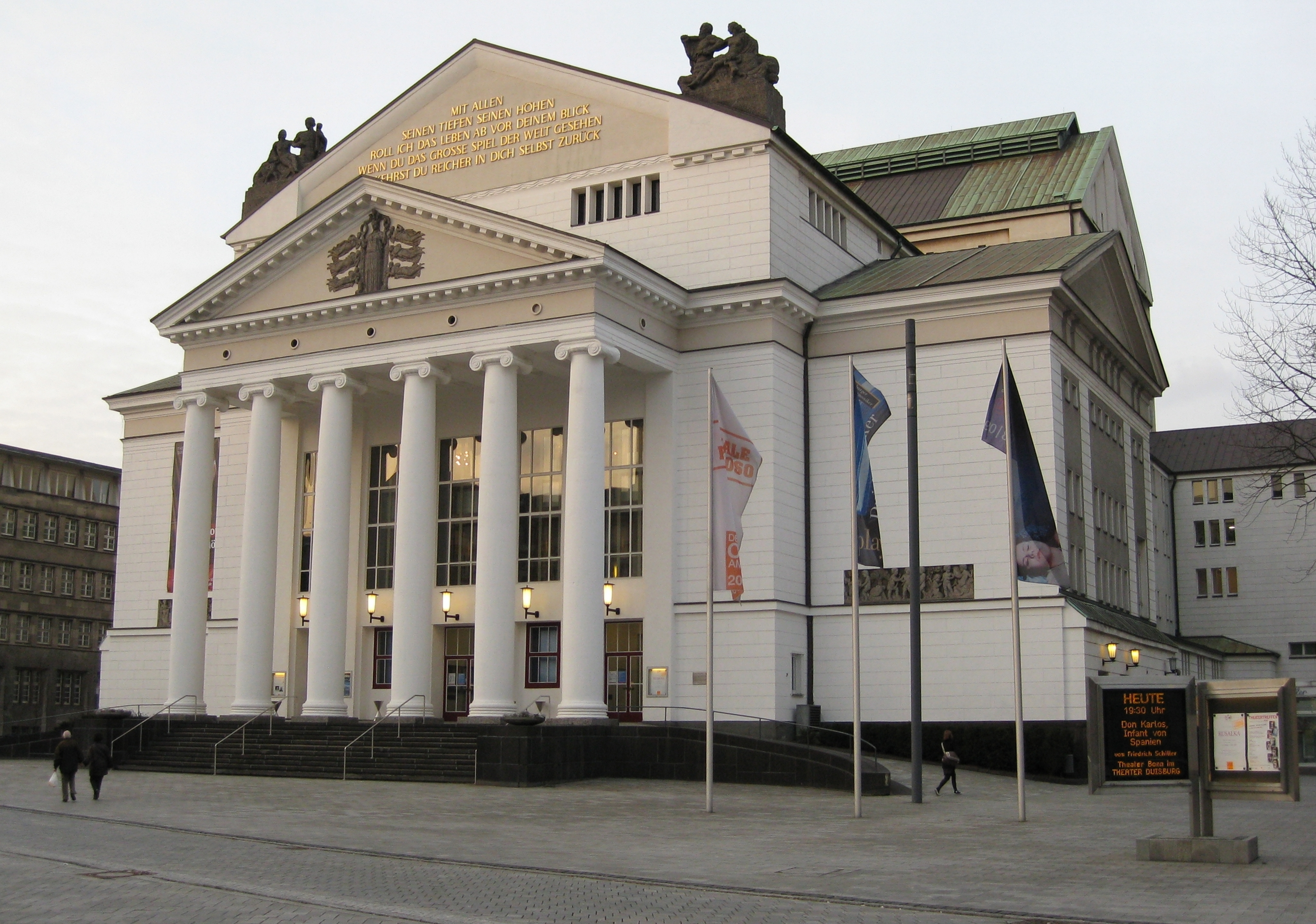
Theater Duisburg (2009)

The Theater Duisburg is located in Duisburg, Germany and is one of two opera houses where performances are given by the Deutsche Oper am Rhein. The other is the Opernhaus Düsseldorf in Düsseldorf.

The original theatre was built in 1912 by Professor Martin Dulfer, destroyed during the Second World War, and rebuilt in 1950. Due to the refurbishment of the Düsseldorf opera house (built in 1956), the 50th Anniversary celebration of the company's resumption after the war took place on 28 September 2006 in Duisburg with a performance of Richard Strauss' Elektra, the company's premiere of which was presented 29 September 1956.

== See also ==
- List of opera houses
