= Deutsche Oper am Rhein =

German opera company

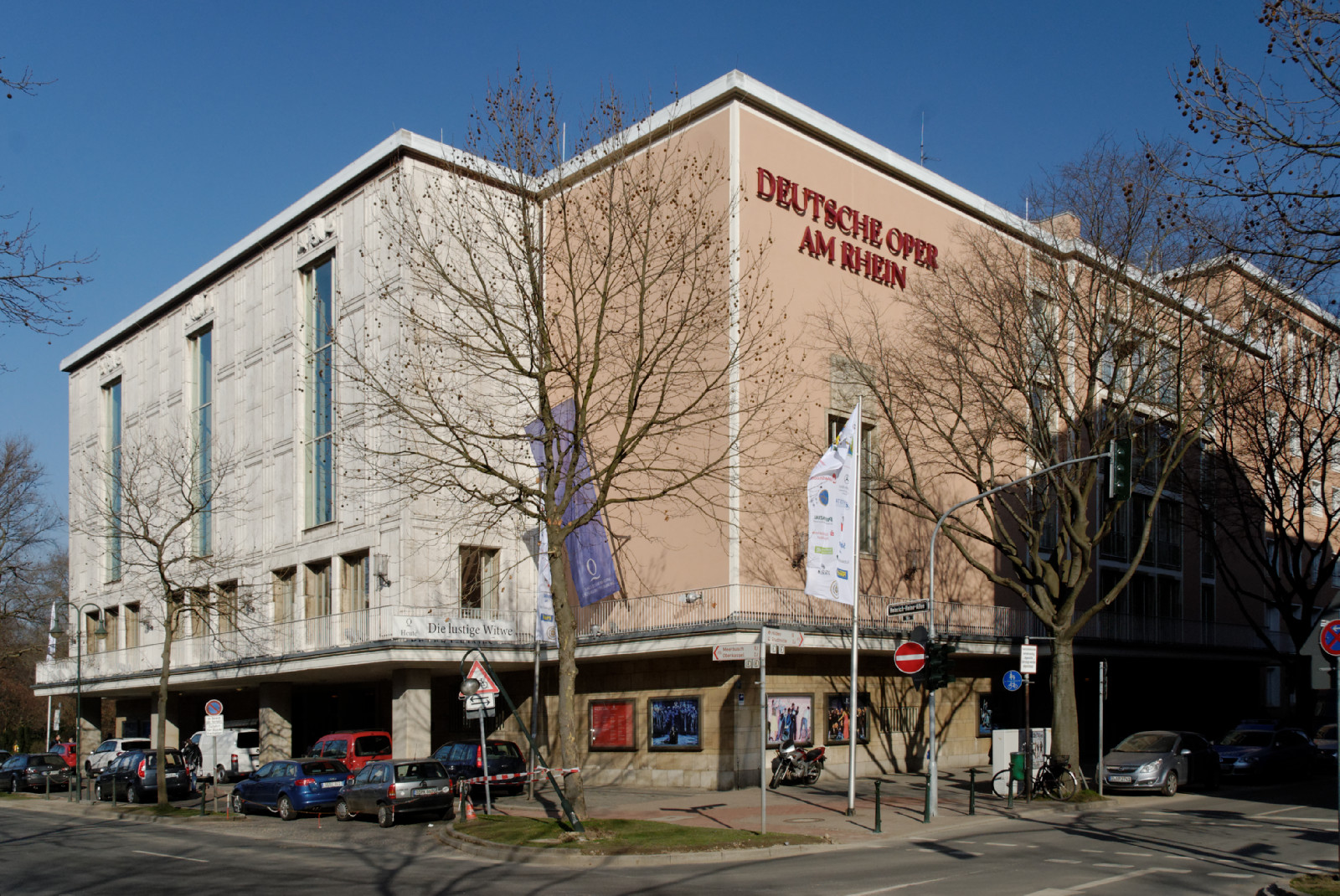
- Opernhaus Düsseldorf (2011)
- Formation: 1955
- Headquarters: Opernhaus Düsseldorf
- Location: Düsseldorf/Duisburg, North Rhine-Westphalia, Germany
- Coordinates: 51°13′39″N 6°46′39″E
- Intendant: Christoph Meyer
- Website: operamrhein.de

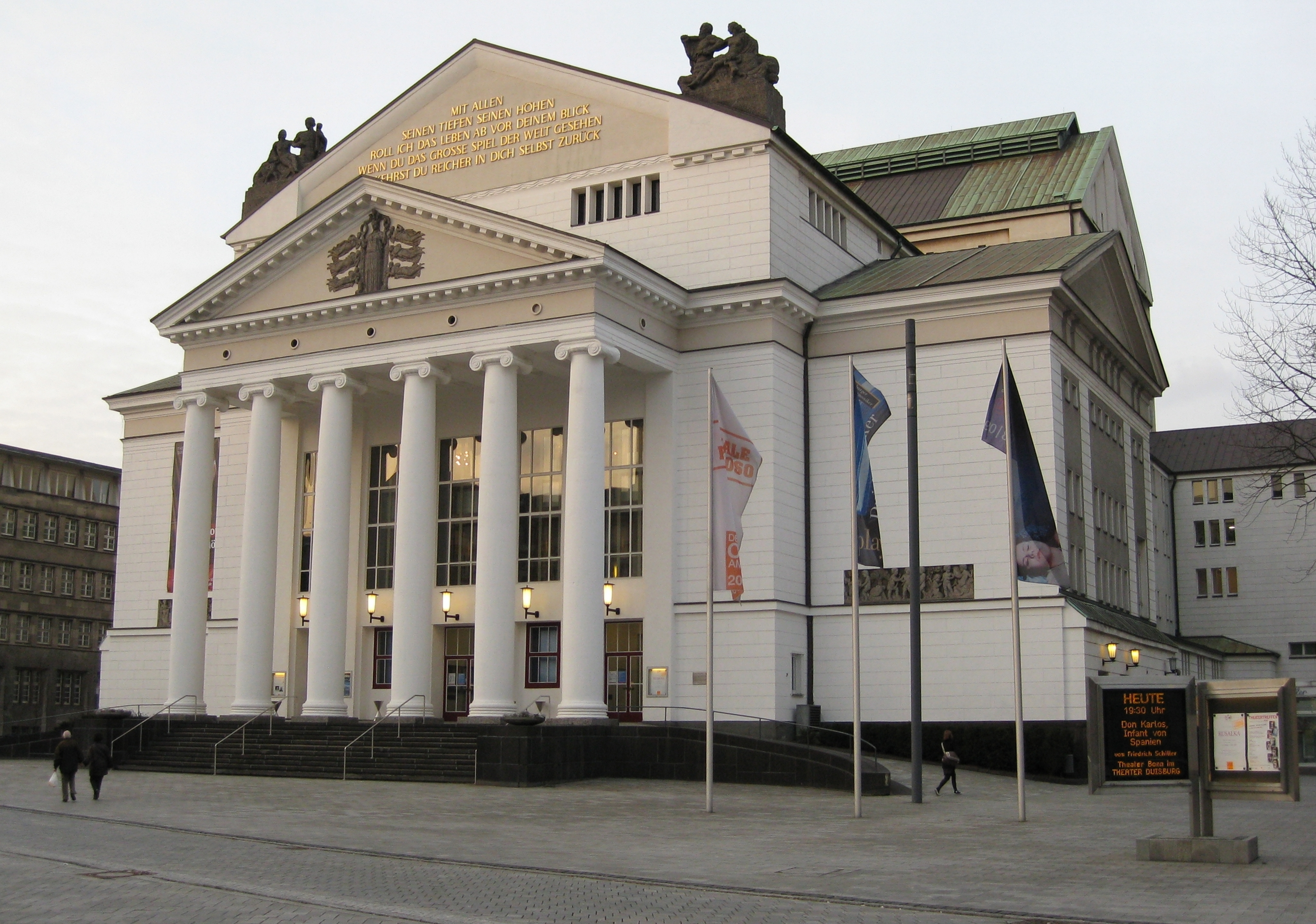
Theater Duisburg in 2009

The Deutsche Oper am Rhein (German Opera on the Rhine) is an opera company based in Düsseldorf and Duisburg. The opera also has an associated classical ballet company. Axel Kober was music director between 2009 and 2024. The resident orchestra, the Düsseldorfer Symphoniker, play both opera and symphonic repertoire.

After the 1875 construction of what became the Düsseldorf Opernhaus, a strong connection between the two cities' opera houses existed from 1887 to 1920, and was not re-established until 1955 with the creation of the Deutsche Oper am Rhein.

The company performs in the Opernhaus Düsseldorf, built in 1875. It was partially destroyed during World War II, and reconstructed to officially re-open in 1956. Theater Duisburg, built in 1912, was destroyed, and rebuilt in 1950. For the 25th anniversary of the house, Alexander Goehr was commissioned to compose an opera. He wrote Behold the Sun with a libretto by John McGrath about the anabaptists in Münster.

Christoph Meyer was artistic director until 2026m while Axel Kober was Generalmusikdirektor until 2024. The current artistic director (interim) is Marwin Wendt and the chief conductor is Vitali Alekseenok. Beginning with the 2027–2028 season, Evan Rogister will be Generalmusikdirektor, while the new Generalintendantin (artistic director) will be Ina Karr. The managing director is Alexandra Stampler-Brown, and the chorus master is Albert Horne.

In 2006 and 2007, a major reorganization and renovation of the Opera House in Düsseldorf took place. The first opera performance in the newly renovated theater was La traviata, conducted by the American John Fiore.

During the year 2000 up to 2005 the German photographer Karl Maria Udo Remmes was invited to portray the backstage operations at the Deutsche Oper in Düsseldorf.

Two singers of the opera, member Oleg Bryjak and guest artist Maria Radner, were killed in the Germanwings Flight 9525 disaster.
