= Billy Budd (opera) =

1951 opera by Benjamin Britten

- Opera by Benjamin Britten
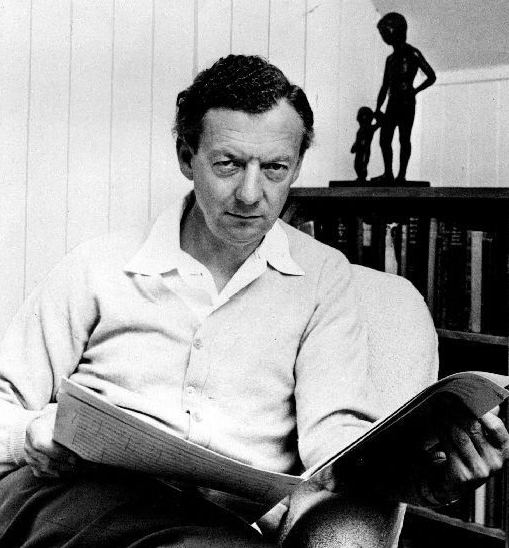
- Britten in 1968
- Librettist: E. M. Forster; Eric Crozier
- Language: English
- Based on: Billy Budd by Herman Melville
- Premiere: 1 December 1951 (original four-act version); 9 January 1964 (revised two-act version); Royal Opera House, London

Billy Budd, Op. 50, is an opera by Benjamin Britten to a libretto by the novelist E. M. Forster and Eric Crozier, based on the novella Billy Budd by Herman Melville. Originally in four acts, the opera received its premiere at the Royal Opera House (ROH), London, on 1 December 1951. Britten later revised the work into a two-act opera, with a prologue and an epilogue. The revised version received its first performance at the ROH, Covent Garden, London, on 9 January 1964.

== Composition history ==
E. M. Forster had an interest in the novella, which he discussed in his Clark lectures at Cambridge University. Forster had admired Britten's music since 1937 when he attended a performance of the play The Ascent of F6 (for which Britten wrote incidental music). Forster met Britten in October 1942, when he heard Peter Pears and Britten perform Britten's Seven Sonnets of Michelangelo at the National Gallery. In 1948, Britten and Forster discussed whether Forster might write an opera libretto. They agreed on Billy Budd as a work to be adapted into an opera, with a formal meeting in January 1949 to discuss the project. Forster worked with Eric Crozier, a regular Britten collaborator, to write the libretto. Scholar Hanna Rochlitz has studied the adaptation and collaboration in detail.

While Britten was composing the music, the Italian composer Giorgio Federico Ghedini premiered his one-act operatic setting of Billy Budd at the 1949 Venice International Festival. This disturbed Britten, but Ghedini's opera gained little notice.

Britten originally intended the title role for Geraint Evans, who prepared it but withdrew because it lay too high for his voice. Britten chose Theodor Uppman to replace him, and Evans sang a different role, that of Mr Flint.

== Performance history ==
When Britten conducted the opera's premiere, in its original form of four acts, the performance received 15 curtain calls. Critical reaction to the premiere, according to a December 1951 New York Times article, was "a very good press and a very fair one, enthusiastic if not really ecstatic". Billy Budd received its United States première in 1952 in performances by Indiana University Opera Company. In 1952, NBC television presented a condensed version of the opera. Performances of the original version fell off in number in the subsequent years. The original four-act version has been occasionally revived, such as at the Vienna State Opera in 2001 and 2011.

In 1960, Britten revised the score into a two-act version, in preparation for a BBC broadcast. Vere's first appearance after the prologue had been originally the Captain's Muster, in which he addresses the crew at the end of Act 1; Britten cut this, explaining to his librettist Eric Crozier that he had never been happy with that scene, so making Vere's first appearance on the ship a private moment alone in his cabin. (Note: According to Uppman, Pears had never felt at ease with this scene, since it required a heroic style of singing which he felt he did not naturally possess. The editors of Letters from a Life further suggest that Britten was stung by a review by Ernest Newman who compared the scene with Gilbert and Sullivan's HMS Pinafore.) Britten changed some of the structural balance from the contrasting Acts 3 and 4. The first performance of the revised two-act version was on 9 January 1964 at the Royal Opera House, Covent Garden, conducted by Georg Solti. The 1966 BBC Television broadcast was conducted by Charles Mackerras, with Peter Glossop (baritone) as Billy, Peter Pears as Vere, and Michael Langdon as Claggart. The 1967 Decca studio recording was made of the two-act version; the recording sessions were attended by staff from the Royal Opera House, Covent Garden.

The first American performance of the revised two-act edition was on 4 January 1966 at New York's Carnegie Hall, given by the American Opera Society. The opera was produced in November 1970 at the Lyric Opera of Chicago, with Uppman reprising the title role, Richard Lewis as Vere, Geraint Evans as Claggart, Bruce Yarnell as Redburn, Raymond Michalski as Flint, and Arnold Voketaitis as Ratcliffe.

External videos
- Mini-feature of the 2010 Glyndebourne production of Billy Budd 6:26

The Metropolitan Opera first staged Billy Budd in 1978. Glyndebourne Festival Opera first staged the opera in 2010, in the operatic directorial debut of Michael Grandage; the production was revived in 2013 and 2026.

A new performing edition of the work, with a revised orchestration by Steuart Bedford, premiered at Des Moines Metro Opera on 1 July 2017.

A new adaptation of Britten's opera, titled The Story of Billy Budd, Sailor, premiered at the Aix-en-Provence Festival in July 2025. Created by Ted Huffman and Oliver Leith, the production starred Ian Rucker as Billy Budd, Christopher Sokolowski as Captain Vere, and Joshua Bloom as John Claggart.

Baritones who have sung the role of Billy Budd include Sir Thomas Allen, Sir Simon Keenlyside, Richard Stilwell, Dale Duesing, Nathan Gunn, Rod Gilfry, Bo Skovhus, Thomas Hampson, Teddy Tahu Rhodes, Peter Mattei, Jacques Imbrailo and Liam Bonner. Notable Veres have included Peter Pears, Richard Cassilly, Philip Langridge, Anthony Rolfe Johnson, and John Mark Ainsley.

Several academic studies investigate various thematic undertones in the opera, including homosexuality and salvation.

Alongside Melville's original novella, Britten's opera served as a major inspiration for Claire Denis's 1999 film Beau Travail. The film is scored with excerpts from Billy Budd, with "Starry Vere, God Bless you!" serving as a leitmotif throughout.

== Roles ==
Role	Voice type	Premiere cast, 1 December 1951 (original four-act version) (Conductor: Benjamin Britten)	Premiere cast for the revised two-act version 9 January 1964 (Conductor: Georg Solti)
Captain Vere of HMS Indomitable	tenor	Peter Pears	Richard Lewis
Billy Budd, able seaman	baritone	Theodor Uppman	Robert Kerns
John Claggart, Master-at-arms	bass	Frederick Dalberg	Forbes Robinson
Mr. Redburn, First Lieutenant	baritone	Hervey Alan	John Shaw
Mr. Flint, Sailing Master	bass-baritone	Geraint Evans	Ronald Lewis
Lieutenant Ratcliffe	baritone or bass	Michael Langdon	David Kelly
Red Whiskers, an impressed man	tenor	Anthony Marlowe	Kenneth MacDonald
Donald	baritone	Bryan Drake	Robert Savoie
Dansker, an old seaman	bass	Inia Te Wiata	Inia Te Wiata
A Novice	tenor	William McAlpine	Joseph Ward
The Novice's Friend	baritone	John Cameron	John Rhys-Evans
Squeak	tenor	David Tree	Robert Bowman
Bosun	bass	Ronald Lewis	Delme Bryn-Jones
First Mate	bass	Rhydderch Davies	Dennis Wicks
Second Mate	bass	Hubert Littlewood	Eric Garrett
Maintop	tenor	Emlyn Jones	Kenneth Collins
Arthur Jones, an impressed man	tenor or baritone	Alan Hobson	Keith Raggett
Cabin Boy	spoken role	Peter Flynn	John Newton
Four midshipmen	trebles	Brian Ettridge, Kenneth Nash, Peter Spencer, Colin Waller	Darian Angardi, Bruce Webb, David Sellar, Raymond Hatch
Chorus: Midshipmen, Powder monkeys, Officers, Sailors, Drummers, Marines			Royal Opera Chorus & Children from Kingsland Central School

Billy Budd is one of very few operas to have an all-male cast.

== Instrumentation ==
4 flutes (2nd, 3rd and 4th doubling piccolos), 2 oboes, cor anglais, 2 clarinets (2nd doubling E-flat clarinet and 2nd bass clarinet), bass clarinet (doubling 3rd clarinet), alto saxophone, 2 bassoons, double bassoon, 4 horns, 4 trumpets (3rd in D), 3 trombones, tuba, timpani, percussion (six players xylophone, glockenspiel, triangle, block, tambourine, side drum, tenor drum, bass drum, whip, cymbals, small gong, 4 drums (played by drummers on stage), harp, strings.

== Synopsis ==
Place: On board the battleship HMS Indomitable, a "seventy-four"
Time: The French Revolutionary Wars in 1797

=== 1951 original 4-act version ===
Prologue

Scene 1: Main deck and quarter-deck of HMS Indomitable

Scene 2: Address

Act 2

Scene 1: Captain Vere's cabin

Scene 2: Berth-deck

Act 3

Scene 1: Main deck and quarter-deck

Scene 2: Captain Vere's cabin

Act 4

Scene 1: Bay of the upper gun-deck

Scene 2: Main deck and quarter-deck

Epilogue

=== 1960 version ===
==== Prologue ====
Captain Edward Fairfax Vere, an old man, reflects on his life and his time in the navy. He reflects on the conflict between good and evil, tormented by guilt over the case of Billy Budd on board his ship, HMS Indomitable, some years earlier.

==== Act 1 ====
The crew of the Indomitable works on deck. For slipping and bumping into an officer, the Novice is sentenced to be flogged. At the same time a cutter approaches, returning from a merchant ship where it has pressed three sailors into the Royal Navy.

One of these sailors, Billy Budd, seems overjoyed with his situation – entirely different from the other two, Joseph Higgins and Arthur Jones, who are not so happy. Claggart, the Master-at-Arms, calls him "a find in a thousand", despite having a stammer. Billy says a jaunty farewell to the Rights o' Man, his former ship, innocent of what his words imply. The officers, forgetting mention of the name of his prior ship, take his words as a deliberate provocation and order the men below decks. Claggart tells Squeak, the ship's corporal, to keep an eye on Billy and give him a rough time.

The Novice is brought back from his flogging, unable to walk and helped along by a friend. The cruelty of the punishment shocks Billy, but he feels certain that if he follows the rules he will be in no danger. Dansker, an old sailor, nicknames Billy "Baby Budd" for his naïveté.

At this point in the four-act version, the climax of Act I features Captain Vere on deck to give a speech to the men. In the two-act version, after Billy has asked about the ship's captain, Dansker mentions Captain Vere's nickname, "Starry Vere," and this is enough for the impulsive Billy to swear his loyalty to the unseen captain.

In his cabin, Captain Vere muses over classical literature. His officers Mr Redburn and Mr Flint enter, and they discuss the Revolution in France and the Spithead and Nore mutinies sparked by French ideas of democracy. The officers warn that Billy may cause trouble, but Vere dismisses their fears and expresses his love for the men under his command.

Below decks, the sailors rough-house, but Dansker remains aloof. Billy goes for some tobacco to cheer him up, and discovers Squeak rifling through his kit. In a rage, Billy begins to stammer. Squeak draws a knife, and fights with Billy, who knocks Squeak to the ground as Claggart and the corporals enter. Billy is still unable to speak, but Dansker relates the events of the fight at Claggart's request. Claggart sends Squeak to the brig, to keep him silent. When alone, Claggart reveals his hatred for Billy and vows to destroy him. He orders the Novice to try to bribe Billy into joining a mutiny, and the broken-spirited Novice quickly agrees. Billy refuses the bribe and believes he will be rewarded, but Dansker warns him to beware of Claggart.

==== Act 2 ====
Claggart asks to see Vere, and after being granted access, begins to tell Vere about danger of mutiny led by one of the crew. However, the sighting of a French ship interrupts Claggart's narrative. The Indomitable goes in pursuit, and fires a warning shot, but loses the enemy in the mist. Claggart returns, and tells Vere that Billy poses a threat of mutiny. Vere does not believe him and sends for Billy so that Claggart may confront him.

Later, in Vere's cabin, Claggart repeats the false charge to Billy's face. Once again, Billy begins to stammer in rage. Unable to speak, he strikes Claggart, killing him. Captain Vere convenes a drumhead court for an immediate court-martial. The officers find Billy guilty and sentence him to hang. Billy begs Vere to save him, and the officers appeal to him for guidance, but Vere remains silent and accepts their verdict. He goes into the cabin where Billy is being held. The meeting between Captain Vere and Billy Budd is represented by 34 orchestral block chords, with no words. (This was the end of Act 3 in the four-act version.)

Billy prepares for his execution in his cell. Dansker brings him a drink and reveals that the crew is willing to mutiny for his sake, but Billy argues against that and is resigned to his fate. At four o'clock that morning, the crew assembles on deck, and Billy is brought out. The Articles of War are read, and state that Billy must be hanged. Just before his execution, he praises Vere with his final words, singing "Starry Vere, God Bless you!". Following the execution, the crew begins to mutter in disaffection, which the officers quickly react to suppress.

==== Epilogue ====
Vere, as an old man, remembers Billy's burial at sea, and acknowledges that he could have saved Billy, but failed to do so, thinking that Billy has instead blessed and saved him. As he recalls Billy's blessing, he realises he has discovered genuine goodness and can be at peace with himself.

== Recordings ==
Year	Cast: Billy Budd, Captain Vere, John Claggart	Conductor, Opera House and Orchestra	Label
1951	Theodor Uppman, Peter Pears, Frederick Dalberg	Benjamin Britten, Chorus and Orchestra of the Royal Opera House, Covent Garden (original version, recording of the world premiere performance)	CD: VAI, Cat: VAIA 1034-3
1967	Peter Glossop, Peter Pears, Michael Langdon	Benjamin Britten, London Symphony Orchestra and the Ambrosian Opera Chorus (revised version)	CD: Decca, Cat: 417 428-2LH3
1997	Dwayne Croft, Philip Langridge, James Morris	Steuart Bedford, Metropolitan Opera Orchestra & Chorus (Recorded 11 March; John Dexter production)	SD video: Met Opera on Demand
1997	Thomas Hampson, Anthony Rolfe-Johnson, Eric Halfvarson	Kent Nagano, Hallé Orchestra and the Hallé Choir, Northern Voices, and the Manchester Boys' Choir (original version)	CD: Erato, Cat: 3984 21631-2
1999	Simon Keenlyside, Philip Langridge, John Tomlinson	Richard Hickox, London Symphony Orchestra and Chorus (revised version)	CD: Chandos, Cat: CHAN 9826
2004	Bo Skovhus, Neil Shicoff, Eric Halfvarson	Donald Runnicles, Orchestra and Chorus of the Vienna State Opera (original version)	CD: Orfeo d'Or; Cat: C 602 033 D
2008	Nathan Gunn, Ian Bostridge, Gidon Saks	Daniel Harding, London Symphony Orchestra and Chorus; Grammy Award for Best Opera Recording 2010	CD: Virgin Classics, Cat: 50999 5 19039 2 3 (revised version)
2011	Jacques Imbrailo, John Mark Ainsley, Philip Ens	Mark Elder, London Philharmonic Orchestra and Glyndebourne Chorus	DVD: Glyndebourne, Cat: OA BD 7086D (revised version)
2013	Jacques Imbrailo, John Mark Ainsley, Philip Ens	Mark Elder, London Philharmonic Orchestra and Glyndebourne Chorus	CD: Glyndebourne, Cat: GFOCD 017-10 (revised version)
