= Behold the Sun =

Opera by Alexander Goehr

- Opera by Alexander Goehr
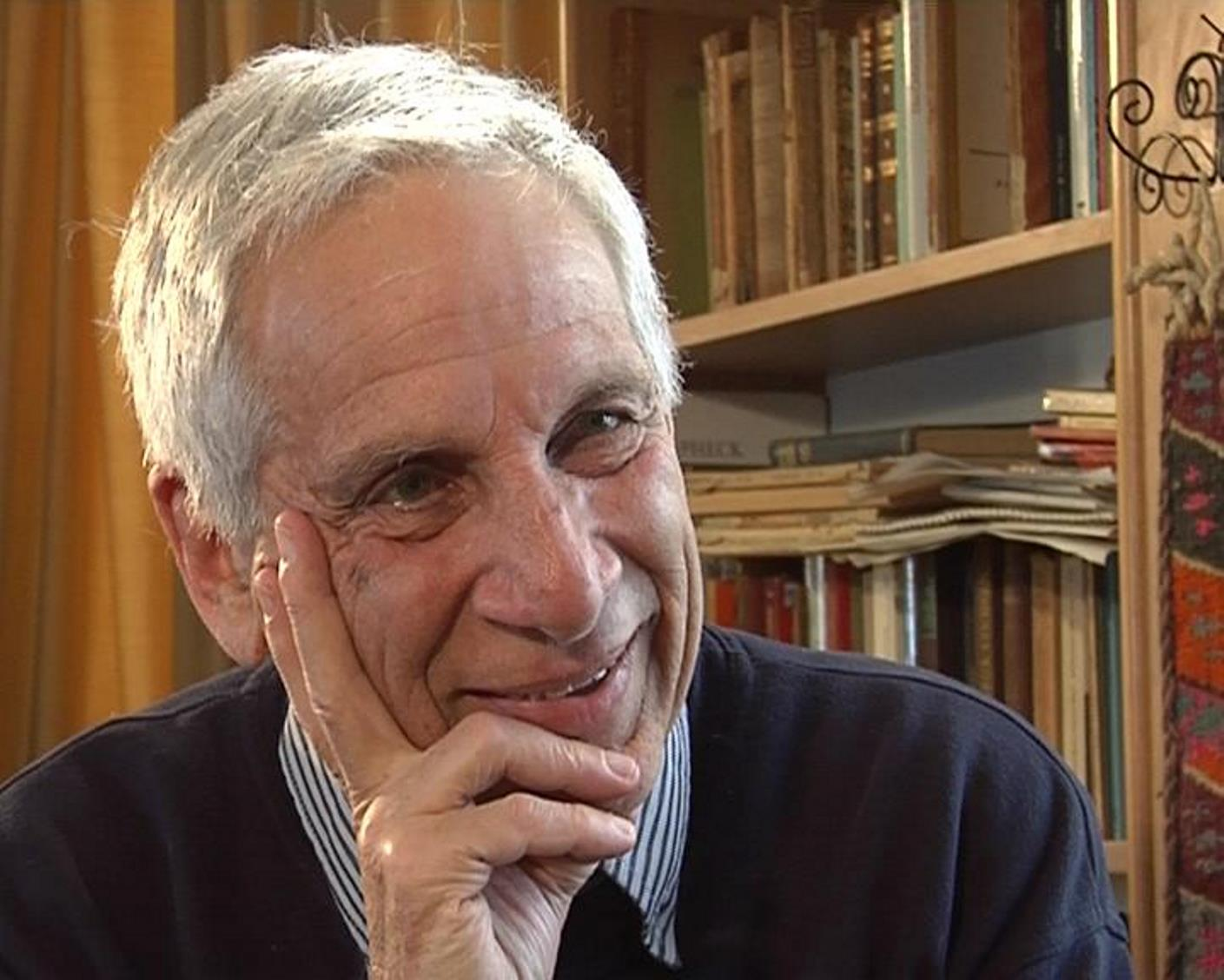
- The composer in 2007
- Other title: Behold the Sun – Die Wiedertäufer; Die Wiedertäufer; The Anabaptists
- Librettist: John McGrath; Goehr
- Language: English, translated to German
- Based on: Anabaptists in Münster
- Premiere: 19 April 1985; Deutsche Oper am Rhein

Behold the Sun, Op. 44, is an opera in three acts and 10 scenes by Alexander Goehr with a libretto by John McGrath and the composer. It was commissioned for the 25th anniversary of the Deutsche Oper am Rhein. Titled Behold the Sun – Die Wiedertäufer, it was premiered there in German in 1985, and published by Schott Music. It was aired in English by the BBC in 1987. The opera has also been called Die Wiedertäufer and The Anabaptists.

== History ==
The opera was commissioned for the 25th anniversary of the Deutsche Oper am Rhein in Düsseldorf and Duisburg. The libretto by John McGrath and Goehr is focused on the Wiedertäufer (anabaptists) and set in Münster in 1543, when two Dutch Anabaptists, Jan Matthys and John of Leiden (or Jan Bokelson) tried to transform the town to a "City of God" in expectation of the Second Coming of Christ. The libretto was translated to German by Bernhard Laux.

Goehr, who was born in Berlin but grew up and worked in England, worked on the composition between 1981 and 1984. Titled Behold the Sun – Die Wiedertäufer, the opera was premiered in Duisburg on 19 April 1985, conducted by Hiroshi Wakasugi, and staged by Bohumil Herlischka in a set designed by Ruodi Barth. It was played in an abridged version, which cut about 50 minutes of Goehr's score.

The opera was first presented in English by the BBC, aired on 1 October 1987. This time, the complete music was played, conducted by John Pritchard. It was published by Schott Music.

An aria from the opera, Op. 44a, was recorded as part of a collection of the composer's works, with soprano Jeanine Thames and the London Sinfonietta, conducted by Oliver Knussen.

== Roles ==
Role	Voice type	Premiere cast, 19 April 1985 Conductor: Hiroshi Wakasugi	BBC cast, 1 October 1987
Mr Berninck, a merchant	baritone		Peter-Christoph Runge
Mrs Berninck	mezzo-soprano		Fiona Kimm
Christian, their son	soprano		
Johann Matthys (anabaptist)	baritone	Norman Bailey	Philip Joll
Divara, his wife and later wife of Jan Bokelson	soprano	Berit Lindholm	Carole Farley
Jan Bokelson (anabaptist)	tenor		Philip Langridge
Blacksmith	bass		Stephen Richardson
Knipperdollinck, burgomaster of the city of Münster	baritone		Norman Welsby
The Prince-Bishop	baritone		John Tranter
His servant	tenor		Harry Nicoll
Fishwife	soprano		Mary Thomas
Limping prophet	tenor		Ian Caley
Captain of the Anabaptist guard	baritone		Jeremy White
Dives	tenor		Justin Lavender
His wife and guests	silent roles		
The people of Münster	SATB chorus		
Anabaptists	small chorus		
A dancer			

== Music ==
Goehr said about his opera that the people are the protagonists, and the focus of the music is their turbae chorus sections. He combined 20th-century harmonies with baroque features such as figured bass and prelude and fugue.
