= Kantan and Damask Drum =

1999 opera music by Alexander Goehr

- Opera by Alexander Goehr
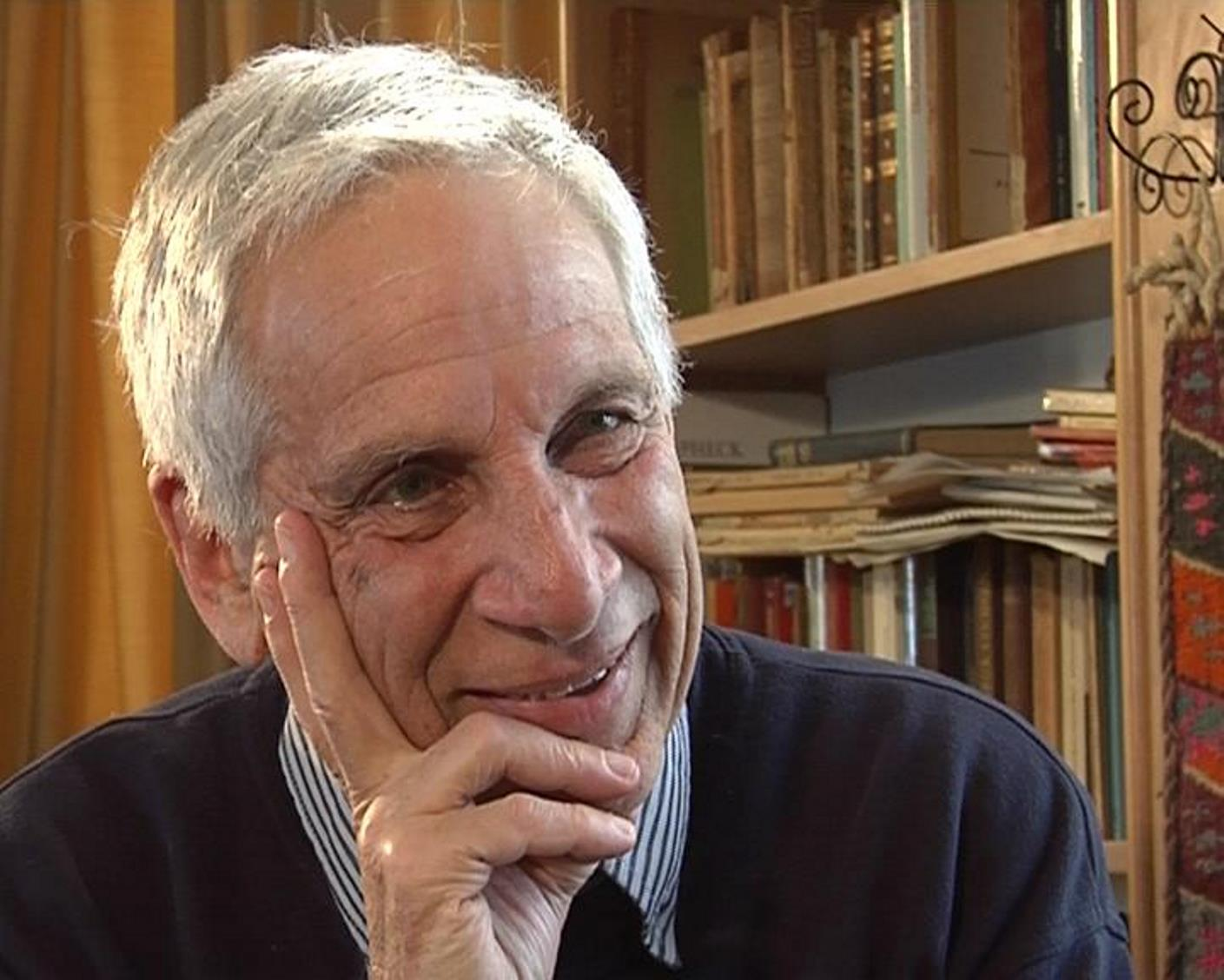
- The composer in 2007
- Librettist: Goehr; Sarugai Koto
- Language: English
- Based on: 2 Noh theatre pieces and a folkplay
- Premiere: 19 September 1999; Opernhaus Dortmund

Kantan and Damask Drum, Op. 67, is opera music in three parts including Kantan and Damask Drum, by Alexander Goehr. The composer and Sarugai Koto adapted the libretto from Japanese Noh theatre from the 15th century. It was commissioned by Opernhaus Dortmund, where it premiered on 19 September 1999. The first performance in the UK was a joint production of the Aldeburgh Festival and the Almeida Opera Festival on 21 June 2001. The music was published by Schott Music. The parts can be played individually.

== History ==
The opera was commissioned by Opernhaus Dortmund. Goehr, who was born in Berlin but grew up and worked in England, composed the works between 1997 and 1998. He chose pieces from Japanese Noh theatre by Zeami Motokiyo as basis for the work. He and Sarugai Koto wrote the English librettos using translations into English by Arthur Waley and Royall Tyler and the adaptations by Yukio Mishima. Part 1 is Kantan, Part 2 is Damask Drum, and Part 3, (Un)fair Exchange, is based on a folk play, a kyogen.

The operas were premiered at Opernhaus Dortmund on 19 September 1999 in German as Kantan – Die Seidentrommel, in a translation by Bernhard Helmich. The performance was conducted by Axel Kober and staged by Philipp Kochheim. Hannes Brock performed the leading role in the first two parts. The first performance in the UK was a joint project of the Aldeburgh Festival and Almeida Opera Festival on 21 June 2001, with David Parry conducting the Sinfonia 21.

The music was published by Schott Music. The duration is given as 90 minutes.

== Kantan ==
Role	Voice type	Premiere cast, 19 September 1999 Conductor: Axel Kober	Almeida cast, 21 June 2001 Conductor: David Parry
Josei, a young man	tenor	Hannes Brock	
Woman, the housekeeper	mezzo-soprano		Emma Selway
Envoy	baritone		
Courtier	bass		
Male voices			
