= Arianna (Goehr) =

Opera by Alexander Goehr

- Opera by Alexander Goehr
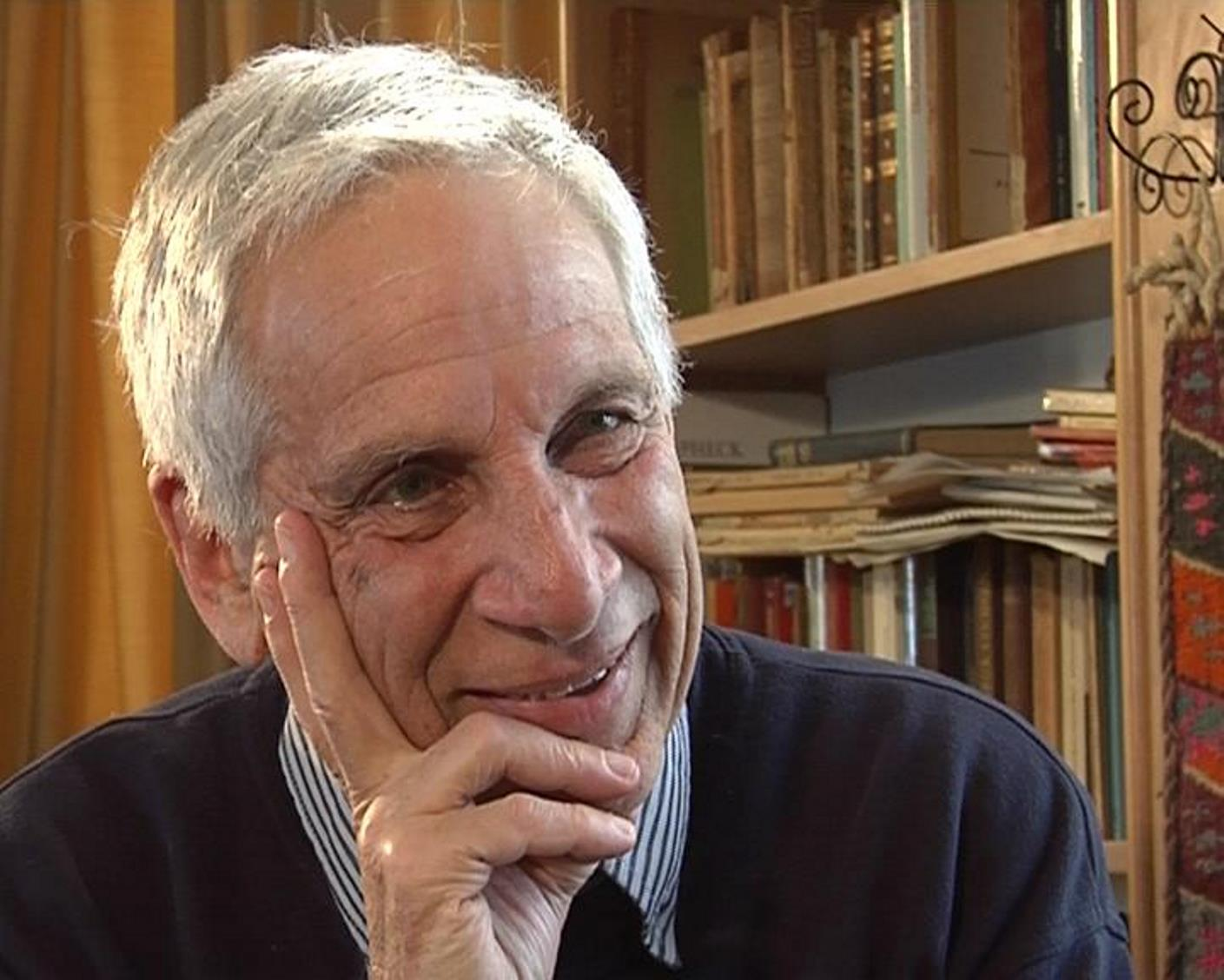
- The composer in 2007
- Librettist: Ottavio Rinuccini
- Language: Italian
- Based on: Libretto for L'Arianna
- Premiere: 15 September 1995; Royal Opera House, London

Arianna is an opera in eight scenes by the English composer Alexander Goehr, premiered at the Royal Opera House in London in 1995. It is set to the libretto (in Italian), by Ottavio Rinuccini that was used by Claudio Monteverdi in his 1608 lost opera, L'Arianna. The opera is Goehr's Op. 58.

== Background ==
Although Rinuccini's libretto survives, the greater part of Monteverdi's music for the opera, originally performed in Mantua in 1608, has been lost. All that remains is Arianna's lament, a solo aria which Monteverdi published separately in 1623. Goehr sets most (but not all) of the original libretto, (which is based on the classical story of Ariadne and Theseus from Ovid's Heroides), preserving the lament but interspersing it with choral episodes. The orchestration is contemporary, including contrabassoon, saxophone, Akai sampler and electric guitar, as is the harmonic language.

== Roles ==
Role	Voice type	Premiere cast 15 September 1995 (Conductor: Ivor Bolton) (Director: Francesca Zambello)
Arianna	mezzo-soprano	Susan Graham
Amore	soprano	Anna Maria Panzarella
Venere/Dorilla	contralto	Sheila Nadler
Teseo	tenor	J. Patrick Raftery
Bacco	countertenor	Axel Köhler
Giove	bass	Gidon Saks
Consigliero	baritone	David Wilson-Johnson
Soldato Primo/Pescatore	tenor	Timothy Robinson
Soldato Secondo/Pescatore	tenor	Christopher Ventris

== Reception ==
The composer wrote in the programme notes of the premiere 'It was surely an act of faith - if not of folly - for me to choose Rinuccini's old Arianna libretto, when I could barely make out the meaning of the words. Yet I knew it was right for me[...]'. Critics tended to agree more with the first part of this statement. The review in the Musical Times for example commented '[the] setting imitates Monteverdi, but feels unnatural. [...] The opera reached its nadir in Goehr's setting of the great surviving fragment itself [..] the harmonic implications of Goehr's bass-line distortions destroyed the dramatic build-up' Meanwhile, Opera News called it a "waste of mezzo Susan Graham's talent in the title role" and "perfunctory."

A recording of the opera, with Ruby Philogene in the title role, was issued in 1998.

== Sources ==
- Alvarez, Geoffrey, Review: Alexander Goehr: Arianna (recording), Tempo, no. 208 (April 1999), p 52, Cambridge University Press.
- Sutcliffe, Tom, When the lights are low (review of London premiere), The Musical Times, vol 136 no, 1833. (November 1995) pp. 610–611.
- Sutcliffe, Tom, "British Journal" (review of the London premiere), Opera News, vol 60 no, 8. (January 1996)
