= Opernhaus Düsseldorf =

Opera house in Düsseldorf, Germany

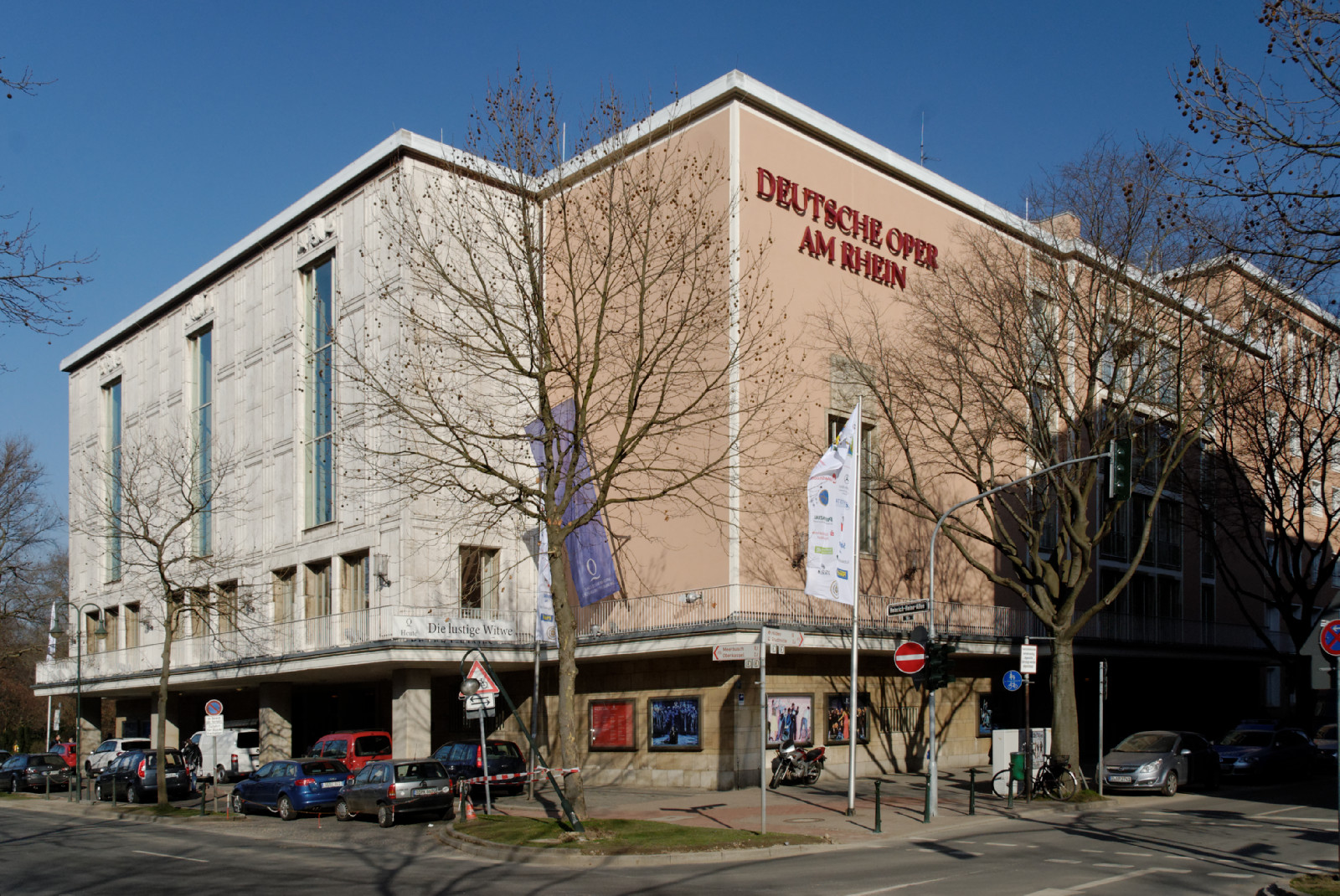
Opernhaus Düsseldorf in 2011

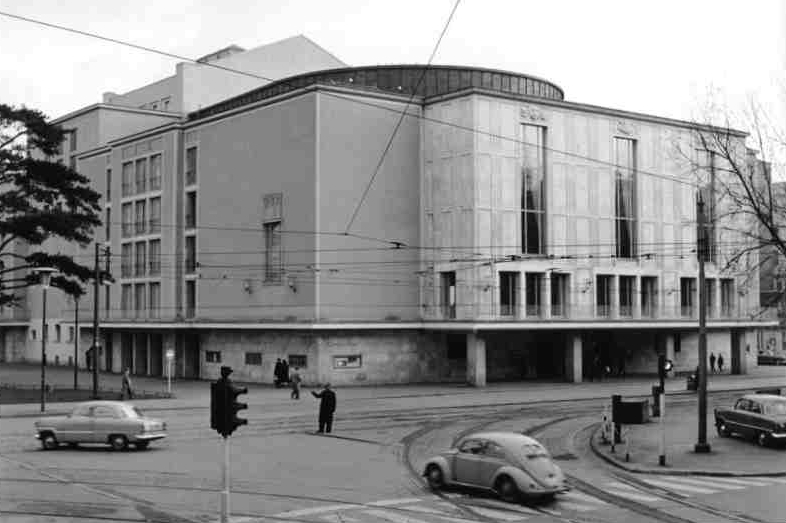
Opernhaus Düsseldorf in 1959

Opernhaus Düsseldorf (English: Düsseldorf Opera House) is a venue and administrative headquarters of the Deutsche Oper am Rhein.

The original opera house was constructed between 1873 and 1875 as the Stadttheater Düsseldorf, designed by Ernst Giese (1832–1903). By its inauguration day, 29 November 1875, it was only partially completed due to cost overruns, but it continued to the operated by the city authorities. By 1891 an electric lighting system had been installed.

The auditorium contained a parquet level, 2 levels of seating plus a gallery, providing a total of 1,260 seats.

By 1921 the city had transferred the ownership of the theatre to the opera company and, in 1925, it was renamed as the Operhaus to distinguish it from another theatre then presenting operettas. After bombs in January and November 1943 during the Second World War destroyed much of the auditorium, some performances did proceed for several months in 1944, but in an auditorium reduced to 1,000 seats. By September 1944 all theatres were closed, and regular performances did not begin again until October 1945 with Bizet's Carmen.

In the post-war years major renovations began in 1954 to improve the temporary wartime repairs. Between 1954 and its reopening on 22 April 1956, the house was restored and inaugurated with a performance of Beethoven's Fidelio. The house now seated 1,342 people.

Also during this time the link between Düsseldorf and Duisburg was re-created in the form of a joint company, the German Opera on the Rhine.

Later in 1956, on 29 September, the company's premiere production of Richard Strauss’ Electra was given in Düsseldorf and, on 30 September, Verdi's Falstaff was presented in Duisburg.

== See also ==
- List of opera houses
