= Alexander Goehr =

English composer (1932–2024)

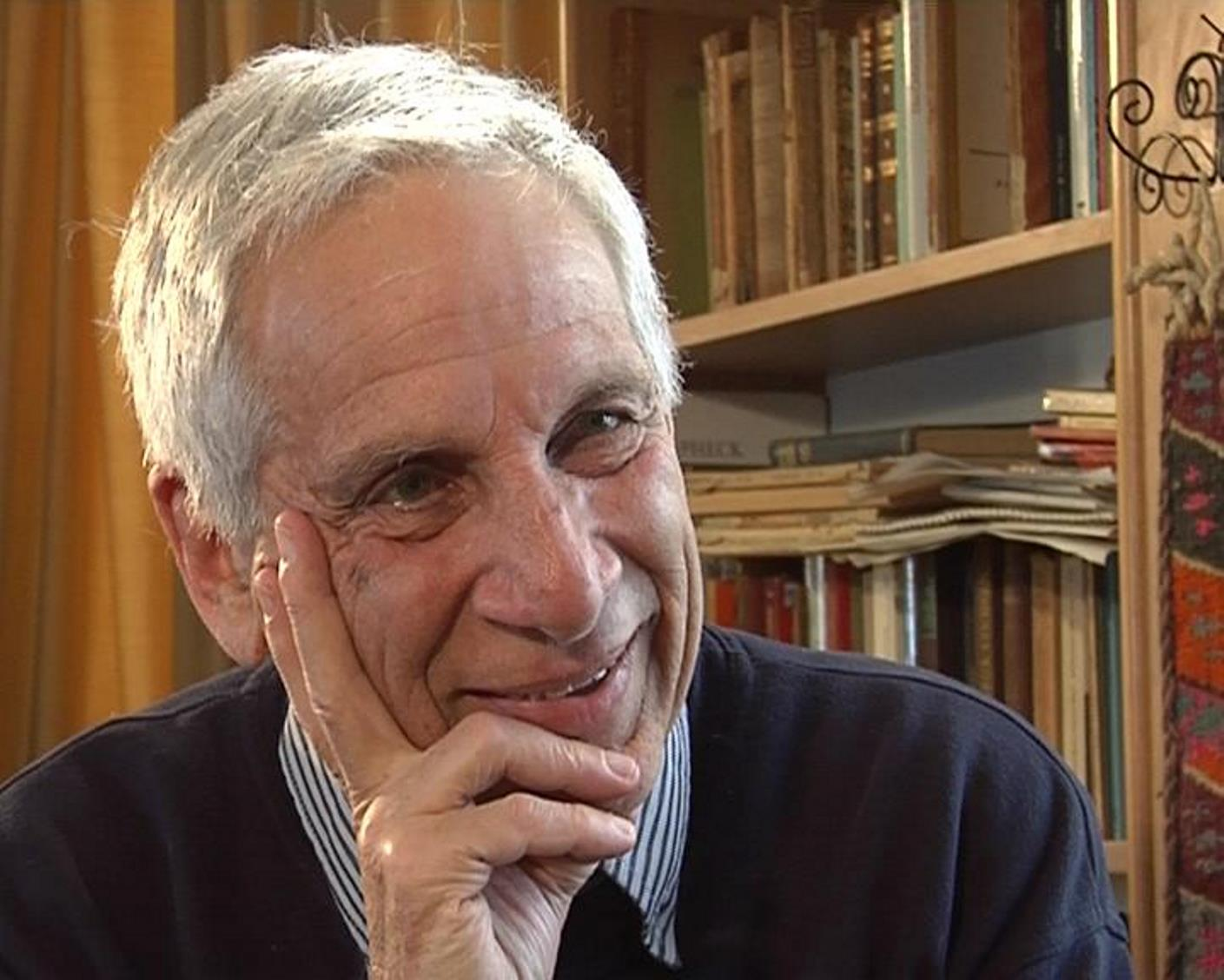
- Goehr in 2007
- Born: Peter Alexander Goehr; 10 August 1932; Berlin, Germany
- Died: 26 August 2024 (aged 92); Cambridgeshire, England
- Education: Royal Northern College of Music
- Occupations: Composer; academic teacher
- Organizations: University of Cambridge
- Works: List of compositions
- Children: 4, including Lydia Goehr
- Parent: Walter Goehr

Peter Alexander Goehr (German: ['ɡøːɐ̯]; 10 August 1932 – 26 August 2024) was a German-born English composer of contemporary classical music and academic teacher. A long-time professor of music at the University of Cambridge, Goehr influenced many notable contemporary composers, including Thomas Adès, Julian Anderson, George Benjamin and Robin Holloway.

Born in Berlin, Goehr grew up in London surrounded by musicians, including his father, the conductor Walter Goehr. Goehr emerged as a central figure in the Manchester School of post-war British composers, including Peter Maxwell Davies and Harrison Birtwistle, in his early twenties. He joined Olivier Messiaen's masterclass in Paris in 1955. Back in England and working for the BBC, he experienced an international breakthrough in 1957 with his cantata The Deluge in 1957, conducted by his father Walter Goehr. He composed Little Symphony in 1963 as a memorial to his father, arriving at a serialism that allowed expressive freedom. He combined avant-garde techniques with elements from music history in works of many genres including the Piano Trio (1966), his first opera, Arden Must Die (1966), the music-theatre piece Triptych (1968–1970), the orchestral Metamorphosis/Dance (1974), and the String Quartet No. 3 (1975). He founded the Music Theatre Ensemble in 1967.

Goehr first lectured in the United States, at the New England Conservatory of Music in Boston from 1968 and at Yale University, then at the Southampton University from 1970. He was professor of music at the University of Leeds from 1971 and at Cambridge University from 1976 to 1999. Goehr returned to a more traditional way of composing with Psalm IV in 1976. He wrote the opera Arianna in 1995, setting the libretto of Monteverdi's lost opera. He focused on chamber music in later years.

== Life and career ==
=== Youth and studies ===
Peter Alexander Goehr was born in Berlin, on 10 August 1932. He came from a musical Jewish family; his mother Laelia (née Rivlin), from Kyiv, was a pianist who had appeared with Vladimir Horowitz at age 12, and his father Walter Goehr was a Schoenberg pupil and pioneering conductor of Schoenberg, Messiaen and Monteverdi. The family moved to Britain a few months after the boy was born. His father became an influential conductor in London, leading the world premiere of Tippett's A Child of Our Time. The boy attended Berkhamsted School in Hertfordshire, where he was known as "an anti-establishment political activist, flirting with the Communist Party". He received lessons from a composer colleague of his father, Allan Gray. Although these premises pointed to Goehr's future in music, his efforts as a composer were not encouraged by his father.

Goehr worked for the music publisher Schott after leaving school. A girl he met on the train to work recruited him for a left-wing Zionist party, and he spent two years in a training kibbutz in Essex. He was then sent to Manchester for political work, where he wrote his first piece, described as "a sort of Zionist pageant with songs".

Goehr studied composition at the Royal Manchester College of Music from 1952 to 1955, with Richard Hall. He became friends there with Peter Maxwell Davies, Harrison Birtwistle, trumpeter Elgar Howarth and pianist John Ogdon. He influenced Davies, a clarinetist, and Birtwhistle who studied to teach, to focus on composition. As students, the five founded the New Music Manchester Group, which performed works by its members and also introduced compositions of the European avant-garde. In 2024, Andrew Davies described the group as a "distinctive, progressive force in what was the generally parochial and conservative world of British music in the early 1950s".

A seminal event in Goehr's development was hearing the UK premiere of Messiaen's Turangalîla Symphony in 1953, conducted by his father. The interest in non-Western music (for instance Indian raga) sparked by the meeting with Messiaen's music combined with the interest in medieval modes shared with Davies and Birtwistle largely influenced Goehr's first musical imaginings. His first acknowledged compositions date from these years: Songs for Babel (1951) and the Piano Sonata, Op. 2, which was dedicated to the memory of Prokofiev. The piano sonata in one movement was played at the Darmstädter Ferienkurse in 1954 by Hedi Stock-Hug.

In 1955, Goehr left Manchester to go to Paris and study with Messiaen at the Conservatoire de Paris, and he studied counterpoint privately with Yvonne Loriod. He remained in Paris until October 1956, becoming friends with Pierre Boulez and involved in the serialist avant-garde movement of those years. Goehr experimented with Boulez's technique of bloc sonore. Eventually Goehr left pure serialism, which he came to consider a cult modelled after twelve-tone works by Anton Webern, forbidding references to any other music:

Choice, taste and style were dirty words; personal style, one could argue, is necessarily a product of repetition, and the removal of repetition is, or was believed to be, a cornerstone of classical serialism as defined by Webern's late works ... All this may well be seen as a kind of negative style precept: a conscious elimination of sensuous, dramatic or expressive elements, indeed of everything that in the popular view constitutes music.

=== Return to the UK, 1956–1976 ===
Upon his return to Britain, Goehr experienced an international breakthrough as a composer with the performance of his cantata The Deluge in 1957, conducted by his father. The work was inspired by writings of Sergei Eisenstein. While the music could be seen as derived from Webern's twelve-tone cantatas, it strives for the harmonic tautness and sonority of Prokofiev's cantatas based on Eisenstein. It was regarded "to have more harmonic coherence and considerably more dramatic impact than most serial music of the time", as his obituary in The Telegraph noted.

Goehr worked for the BBC as a musical assistant from 1960 to 1967. He received two more cantata commissions from the BBC; Sutter's Gold for choir, baritone and orchestra was unsuccessful. Singers found it impossibly difficult to perform, and critics dismissed it when it was first performed at the 1961 Leeds Festival. Goehr listened to criticism and described his position:

If one wishes, one can just say that music has to be autonomous and self sufficient; but how to sustain such a view when people who sing for pleasure are deprived of true satisfaction in the performance of new work? ... We can talk about music in terms of the ideas that inform it; we can talk about structure and techniques; we can talk about aesthetics or ethics or politics. But we have to remember that while all this, realistic or not, is of great importance to composers and to anyone who likes to follow what composers are doing, what is being discussed is not the music itself but the location of the music, the place where it exists.

Goehr was encouraged by his friend, the choral conductor John Alldis, to compose more choral music such as Two Choruses in 1962, which used a combination serialism and modality, to become an approach for years to come. His quest for expressiveness led him to his Little Symphony, Op. 15 (1963), composed as a memorial to his father who had unexpectedly died. It is based upon a chord-sequence derived from music from Mussorgsky's Pictures at an Exhibition, "Catacombæ" and "Cum mortuis in lingua mortua", of which his father had written a harmonic analysis. Boulez, who had facilitated performances of Goehr's works, refused to program Little Symphony. Goehr composed works of many genres including the Piano Trio (1966). He wrote Romanza, a cello concerto, in 1968 for Jacqueline du Pré and Daniel Barenboim. The orchestral Metamorphosis/Dance was premiered in 1974 by the London Philharmonic Orchestra conducted by Bernard Haitink. He composed the String Quartet No. 3 in 1975–1976.

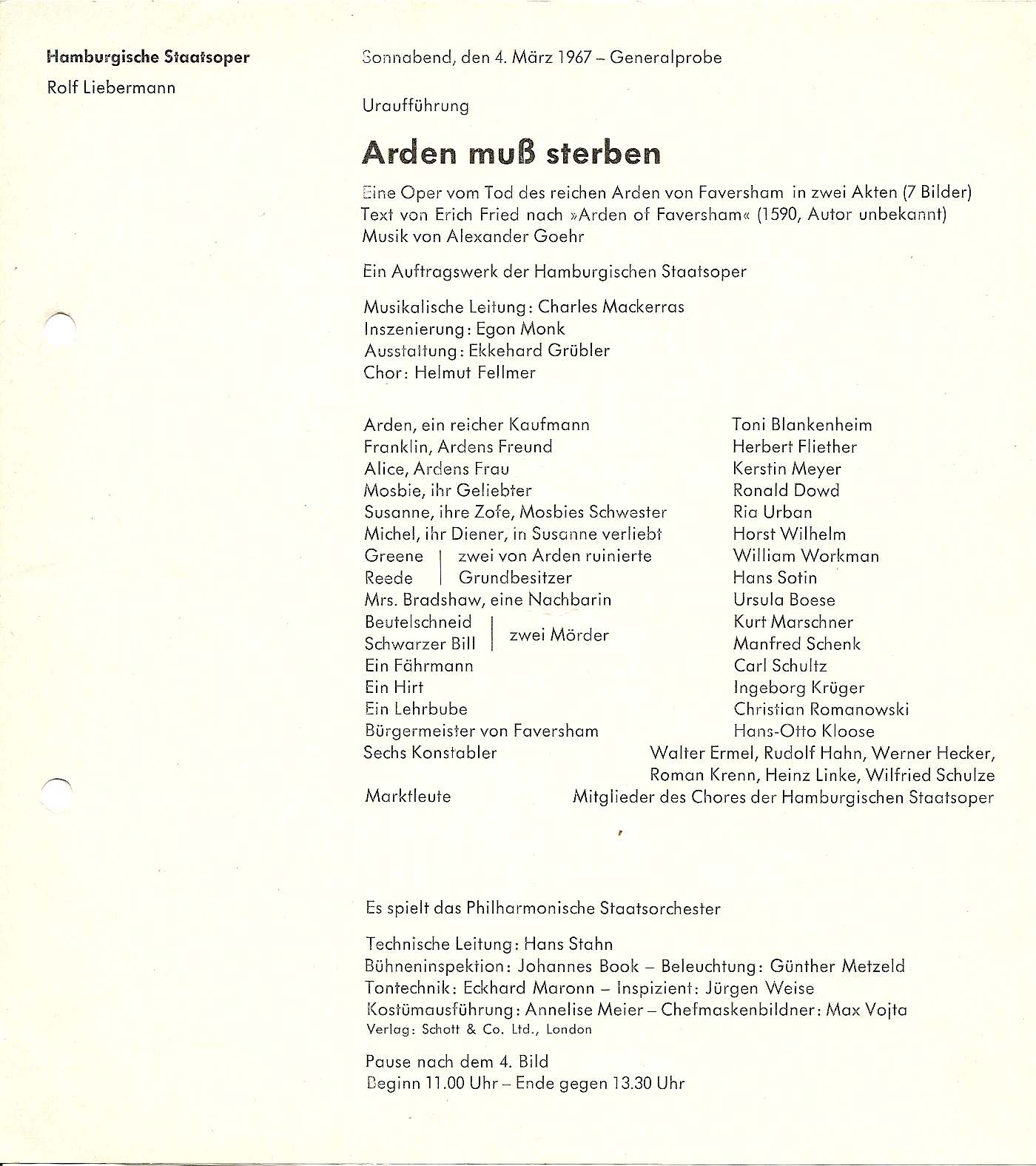
Besetzungszettel for the premiere of Arden Must Die

Goehr founded the Wardour Castle Summer School in Wiltshire with Peter Maxwell Davies and Harrison Birtwistle in 1964, which led to a focus on opera and music theatre. In 1966 he wrote his first opera, Arden Must Die, based on a compilation of a Jacobean morality play by Erich Fried. The opera was premiered in German at the Hamburg State Opera in 1967.

In 1967 he founded the Music Theatre Ensemble, as a pioneer of musical theatre in England; in 1971 he completed a three-part cycle for music theatre Triptych of three works, Naboth's Vineyard (1968) and Shadowplay (1970), both explicitly written for the Music Theatre Ensemble, while the third part, the cantata Sonata about Jerusalem was commissioned by Testimonium in Jerusalem and performed there in 1971 by the Israel Chamber Orchestra, conducted by Gary Bertini.

From the end of the 1960s Goehr held prestigious academic appointments. In 1968–69 he was the first composer-in-residence at the New England Conservatory of Music in Boston, and went on to teach at Yale University as an associate professor of music. Goehr returned to Britain as a visiting lecturer at Southampton University (1970–1971). In 1971 he was appointed West Riding Professor of Music at the University of Leeds. In 1976 Goehr became Professor of Music at Cambridge University and taught there until he retired in 1999. His students included some of England's most notable composers to come, such as Thomas Adès, Julian Anderson, George Benjamin and Robin Holloway. In Cambridge he became a fellow of Trinity Hall.

=== 1976–1996 ===
In 1976, Goehr composed Psalm IV in a "bright modal sonority", in a departure from serialism, towards more transparent sounds. He found a fusion of modal harmonics and the tradition of figured bass. Over the following twenty years he applied this approach to traditional genres such as symphonies, composing Sinfonia in 1979 and Symphony with Chaconne in 1987. In 1985 he composed ... a musical offering (J. S. B. 1985) ..., written in memory of Johann Sebastian Bach. It was premiered by Oliver Knussen, who remained a close collaborator.

Goehr focused especially on vocal music, with many works reflecting socio-political themes. The Death of Moses (1992) uses Moses' refusal to die as an allegory for the victims of the Holocaust, while the opera Behold the Sun (1985) deals with the violent revolution of the Anabaptists in Münster of 1543. Non-political vocal works include Sing, Ariel, recalling Messiaen's bird vocalization setting English poetry, and the 1995 opera Arianna to Ottavio Rinuccini's historic libretto for Monteverdi's lost L'Arianna, exploring the sounds of Italian Renaissance music. The opera was first performed at the Royal Opera House in London. His engagement with Monteverdi's music dates back to the cantata The Death of Moses, which he described as "Monteverdi heard through Varèse". He described his process for Arianna:

The impression I aim to create is one of transparency: the listener should perceive, both in the successive and simultaneous dimensions of the score, the old beneath the new and the new arising from the old. We are to see a mythological and ancient action, interpreted by a 17th-century poet in a modern theatre.

In 1987 the BBC invited Goehr to present the Reith Lectures. In a series of six lectures, titled The Survival of the Symphony he traces the importance of the symphony, and its apparent fall from grace in the 20th century. Goehr's Colossos or Panic was premiered in 1992 by the Boston Symphony Orchestra conducted by Seiji Ozawa.

=== 1996–2024 ===
Although the last fifteen years of Goehr's output received less coverage in both academic analysis and performances, they represent an interesting phase of his work. He wrote the opera Kantan and Damask Drum in 1999, premiered at the Oper Dortmund. It combined two plays from the Japanese Noh theatre tradition, with a short kyogen humorous interlude; he adapted the Japanese texts that date back to the 15th century. The music is inspired by the relationship between music and drama found in Noh theatre.

In the years following, Goehr focused on chamber music, composing works of "unprecedented rhythmic and harmonic immediacy", such as the Piano Quintet in 2000 and the Fantasie for cello and piano in 2005, with sonorities reminiscent of Ravel. Marching to Carcassonne was written in 2003 for pianist Peter Serkin and the London Sinfonietta, alluding to neoclassicism. A set of piano pieces, Symmetry Disor.der Reach, recalling a Baroque suite, was premiered bv Huw Watkins in 2007. Manere for violin and clarinet (2008) is based on a fragment of medieval plainchant and explores musical ornamentation. Since Brass nor Stone for string quartet and percussion was inspired by Shakespeare's sonnet of the same name; it was written in 2008 in memory of Pavel Haas for percussionist Colin Currie and the Pavel Haas Quartet. It achieved the chamber category of the 2009 British Composer Awards. Goehr wrote …between the lines… in 2013 for the Scharoun Ensemble Berlin.

After a hiatus of almost ten years, Goehr returned to opera again with Promised End (2008–09), based on Shakespeare's King Lear. It was first performed by English Touring Opera in 2010. He wrote When Adam Fell simultaneously, a BBC commission for orchestra based on the chromatic bass from Bach's chorale setting "Durch Adams Fall ist ganz verderbt", BWV 705, that Messiaen had pointed out to him. To These Dark Steps/The Fathers are Watching was written for tenor, children's choir and ensemble in 2011–12, setting texts by the Israeli poet Gabriel Levin about the bombing of the Gaza Strip during the Iraq War; it was premiered in a concert of the Birmingham Contemporary Music Group conducted by Knussen marking Goehr's 80th birthday.

Largo Siciliano (2012) was a trio praised for its balance between violin, horn and piano. The chamber symphony ...between the lines... (2013), written on a commission from the Birmingham Contemporary Music Group, is a monothematic work in four movements played without break, inspired by Schoenberg's Chamber Symphony, Op. 9. Two Sarabandes was composed for the Bamberg Symphony who premiered it conducted by Lahav Shani. A string quartet Ondering was premiered by the Villiers Quartet at the Royal Northern College of Music in 2023. Goehr died at his home in Cambridgeshire on 26 August 2024, at the age of 92.

== Works ==
=== Musical style ===
Many of Goehr's works are studies in the synthesis of disparate elements. Examples include The Deluge (1957–1958), which was inspired by Eisenstein's notes for a film, itself based on a writing by Leonardo da Vinci. Other works' inspirations range from the formal proportions of a late Beethoven piano sonata (Metamorphosis/Dance, 1973–1974) to a painting by Goya (Colossus or Panic, 1990), to the sinister humour of Bertolt Brecht (Arden Must Die, 1966) or to the Japanese Noh theatre (Kantan and Damask Drum, 1999).

Just as The Deluge takes its cue from an unfinished project (Eisenstein never finished the planned film), many of Goehr's works include a synthesis of fragments or unfinished projects left by other artists. The cantata The Death of Moses resonates with Schoenberg's unfinished Moses und Aron; the opera Arianna (1995) is the setting of the libretto of a lost opera by Monteverdi, and posthumously published prose fragments by Franz Kafka inspired or appear in Das Gesetz der Quadrille (1979).

On a strictly technical musical level, Goehr's tried unifying the contrapuntal rigour and motivic workings of the First Viennese School and Second Viennese School with a strong sense of harmonic pacing and sonority. Goehr remained indebted to Messiaen, apparent in his lifelong commitment to modality as an integration of serialism and tonality, as well as in melodic writing inspired by bird-song.

== Honours ==
Goehr was an honorary member of the American Academy of Arts and Letters and a Churchill Fellow. In 2004 he was awarded an honorary doctorate of music from the University of Plymouth. He became an honorary member of the Royal Philharmonic Society. His manuscripts are held by the Akademie der Künste in Berlin.

== Recordings ==
- Goehr, Alexander; Naxos Digital Services US (2013), GOEHR, A.: Chamber music (Since Brass, nor Stone ...) (Currie, Nash Ensemble, Pavel Haas Quartet), Hong Kong: Naxos Digital Services US Inc, OCLC 885069785
- Goehr, Alexander; Naxos Digital Services US (2013), GOEHR, A.: Marching to Carcassonne, Hong Kong: Naxos Digital Services US Inc, OCLC 885065562
- Southwest Chamber Music (Musical group); Hollander, John; Bryn-Julson, Phyllis; Foschia, Jim; Ginstling, Gary; Horn, Stuart; Lashinsky, Leslie; Von der Schmidt, Jeff; Gottschewski, Agnes; Karlin, Jan; Blankenburg, Gayle; Mosko, Stephen L.; Goehr, Alexander; Carter, Elliott (2009), Alexander Goehr, Elliott Carter, Hong Kong: Naxos Digital Services/Cambria, OCLC 704927535
- Goehr, Alexander; Kessler, Susan; Vignoles, Roger; Kafka, Franz; Lindsay String Quartet (1983). Alexander Goehr / CD, Das Gesetz der Quadrille : op. 41. / Alexander Goehr (in undetermined language). Mainz: Wergo. OCLC 1050671457.
- Goehr, Alexander; Becker, Daniel; Kam, Ning; Carroll, Thomas; Elias String Quartet (2008), Music by Alexander Goehr (in no linguistic content), London: Meridian, OCLC 678574775
- Goehr, Alexander; Atherton, David; Royal Liverpool Philharmonic Orchestra (1982), Metarmorphosis / op. 36 / Alexander Goehr. The Royal Liverpool Philharmonic Orchestra. Conducted by David Atherton (in undetermined language), Unicorn-Kanchana, OCLC 916390495
- Goehr, Alexander; Watkins, Huw (2007), Symmetry disorders reach (in no linguistic content), Mainz, Germany: Wergo, OCLC 811246845

== Writings ==
Books

- Goehr, Alexander (1978). Musical Ideas and Ideas about Music. London: Birkbeck College. OCLC 16422090.
- —— (1998). Puffett, Derrick (ed.). Finding the Key: Selected Writings of Alexander Goehr. London: Faber and Faber. ISBN 978-0-571-19310-3. OCLC 38844411.

Articles

- Goehr, Alexander (January 1965). "Tippett at Sixty". The Musical Times. 106 (1463): 22–24. doi:10.2307/948584. JSTOR 948584.
- ——; Smalley, Roger; Crosse, Gordon; Tavener, John; Ginastera, Alberto (Summer 1967). "Personal Viewpoints: Notes by Five Composers". Tempo. 81 (Stravinsky's 85th Birthday): 19–29. JSTOR 943883.
- ——; Sadie, Stanley (July 1968). "Naboth's Vineyard: Alexander Goehr talks to Stanley Sadie". The Musical Times. 109 (1505): 588–590. doi:10.2307/952669. JSTOR 952669.
- —— (June 1973). "The Study of Music at University—5". The Musical Times. 114 (1564): 588–590. doi:10.2307/955547. JSTOR 955547.
- —— (1973–1974). "The Theoretical Writings of Arnold Schoenberg". Proceedings of the Royal Musical Association. 100: 85–96. doi:10.1093/jrma/100.1.85. JSTOR 766177.
- —— (Spring–Summer 1975). "The Theoretical Writings of Arnold Schoenberg". Perspectives of New Music. 13 (2): 3–16. doi:10.2307/832080. JSTOR 832080.
- —— (November 1983). "Richard Hall: A Memoir and a Tribute". The Musical Times. 124 (1689): 677–678. doi:10.2307/961421. JSTOR 961421.
- —— (March–July 1985). "Schoenberg and Karl Kraus: The Idea behind the Music". Music Analysis. 4 (1/2): 59–71. doi:10.2307/854235. JSTOR 854235. [University of Southampton lecture, 1983]
- ——; Wintle, Christopher Wintle (July–October 1992). "The Composer and His Idea of Theory: A Dialogue". Music Analysis. 11 (2–3): 143–175. doi:10.2307/854024. JSTOR 854024.
- —— (October 1994). "Guest Editorial". The Musical Times. 135 (1820): 610–611. doi:10.2307/1003125. JSTOR 1003125.
- —— (March 1997). "For Derrick Puffett". Music Analysis. 16 (1): 1–3. doi:10.2307/854111. JSTOR 854111.
- —— (Summer 1999). "The Ages of Man as Composer. What's Left to Be Done?". The Musical Times. 140 (1867): 19–28. doi:10.2307/1193892. JSTOR 1193892.
- ——; Kemp, Ian; Neighbour, Oliver; Miller, Karl; Wood, Hugh; Matthews, David; Maconie, Robin; Payne, Anthony (April 2010). "Daivd Drew: Tributes & Memories". Tempo. 64 (252): 14–20. doi:10.1017/S0040298210000136. JSTOR 40794440.

Reviews

- Goehr, Alexander (December 1960). "Review: Harmony without Function". The Musical Times. 101 (1414): 762. doi:10.2307/948913. JSTOR 948913.
- —— (November 1963). "Review: Schoenberg Exercises". The Musical Times. 104 (1449): 795–796. doi:10.2307/950161. JSTOR 950161.
- —— (November 1964). "Review: Schoenberg's Letters". The Musical Times. 105 (1461): 820–821. doi:10.2307/950438. JSTOR 950438.
- —— (January 1968). "Review: Schoenberg Fundamentals". The Musical Times. 109 (1499): 35–36. doi:10.2307/951415. JSTOR 951415.
- —— (September 1975). "Review: Style and Idea". Tempo (114): 25–28. JSTOR 943695.
- —— (March 1981). "Review: The Letters of Claudio Monteverdi". Tempo (136): 25–28. JSTOR 946378.
